= Miroslav Krleža bibliography =

This is a list of writings published by Miroslav Krleža.

== Works ==
- Legend (Croatian: Legenda), 1914
- Masquerade (Croatian: Maskereta), 1914
- Zarathustra and the Young Man (Croatian: Zaratustra i mladić), short story, 1914
- Pan, 1917
- Three Symphonies (Croatian: Tri simfonije), 1918
- Autumn's Song (Croatian: Jesenja pjesma), 1918
- Women in the Rain (Croatian: Žene na kiši), 1918
- Poems I (Croatian: Pjesme I.), poetry, 1918
- Poems II (Croatian: Pjesme II.), poetry, 1918
- The Ballad Croatian: Balada), 1918
- Vita nuova (Italian: New Life (Note: Sometimes rendered as Vita nouva)), 1918
- Christmas Eve Night (Croatian: Badnja noć), 1918
- Salome (Croatian: Saloma), 1918
- Christopher Columbus (Croatian: Kristofor Kolumbo), 1918
- Poems III (Croatian: Pjesme III.), poetry, 1919
- Michelangelo Buonarroti, 1919
- The Lyric (Croatian: Lirika, 1919
- Autumn Night (Croatian: Jesenja noć), 1919
- Into the Evening (Croatian: U predvečerje), 1919
- Veliki meštar sviju hulja, 1919
- A Morning Victory Over Darkness (Croatian: Jutarnja pobjeda nad tminom), 1919
- A Morning Just Before the Rain (Croatian: Jutro pred kišu), 1919
- Hodorlahomor the Great (Croatian: Hodorlahomor Veliki), 1919
- Barack 5B (Croatian: Baraka pet Be), short story collected in Croatian God Mars, 1921
- The Royal Hungarian National Guard Novella (Hungarian: Magyar királyi honvéd novella), short story collected in Croatian God Mars, 1921
- Croatian Rhapsody (Croatian: Hrvatska rapsodija), 1921
- The Death of Franjo Kadaver (Croatian: Smrt Franje Kadavera), short story collected in Croatian God Mars, 1921
- Three Homedefenders (Croatian: Tri domobrana), short story collected in Croatian God Mars, 1921
- A Writer's Note (Croatian: Piščeva opaska), 1921
- Homedefender Jambrek (Croatian: Domobran Jambrek), short story collected in Croatian God Mars, 1921
- The First Mass of Alojz Tiček (Croatian: Mlada misa Alojza Tičeka), 1921
- Adam and Eve (Croatian: Adam i Eva), 1922
- Galicia (Croatian: Galicija), 1922
- The Death of Florijan Kranjčec (Croatian: Smrt Florijana Kranjčeca), 1922
- Golgotha (Croatian: Golgota), 1922
- The Green Flag (Croatian: Zeleni barjak), 1922
- The Hungarian Variation (Croatian: Madžarska varijacija (Note: Modern Croatian spelling: Mađarska varijacija)), 1922
- Croatian God Mars (Croatian: Hrvatski bog Mars), 1922
- The Three Cavaliers of Miss Melania (Croatian: Tri kavaljera frajle Melanije), 1922
- Wolfhound (Croatian: Vučjak), 1922
- In extremis, 1923
- Ver sacrum, 1923
- Membra disiecta, 1923
- Exodus into Autumn (Croatian: Exodus u jesen), 1923
- Home Defenders Gebeš and Benčina Discuss Lenin (Croatian: Domobrani Gebeš i Benčina razgovaraju o Lenjinu), 1924
- In Death (Croatian: Na samrti (Note: Usual Croatian spelling: Na smrti; samrti is a poetic variant.)), 1924
- The Death of Toma Bakran (Croatian: Smrt Tome Bakrana), 1924
- Winds Above the Provincial City (Croatian: Vjetrovi nad provincijalnim gradom), 1924
- The Death of the Harlot Maria (Croatian: Smrt bludnice Marije), 1924
- A Girl Among Beasts (Croatian: Djevojka među zvijerima), 1924
- The Death of Richard Harlequin (Croatian: Smrt Rikarda Harlekinija), 1925
- Longing (Croatian: Čežnja), 1925
- Journey to Russia (Croatian: Izlet u Rusiju), 1926
- Messrs. Glembay (Croatian: Gospoda Glembajevi), 1928
- The Love of Marcel Faber-Fabriczy for Miss Laura Warronigov (Croatian: Ljubav Marcela Faber-Fabriczyja za gospođicu Lauru Warroniggovu), 1928
- In Agony (Croatian: U agoniji), play, 1928
- Christmas Eve (Croatian: Badnjak (Note: Badnjak can also refer to a Yule log, see Badnjak (Croatian))), 1928
- In the Fog (Croatian: U magli), 1928
- A Lyrical Variation of an Autumn Twilight (Croatian: Lirska varijacija o jesenjem sutonu, 1928
- A Thousand and One Death (Note: Meaning A Thousand [of something] and One Death) (Croatian: Hiljadu i jedna smrt), 1928
- The Benefactor (Croatian: Dobrotvori), 1929
- How Dr. Gregor Met the Evil One for the First Time in His Life (Croatian: Kako je doktor Gregor prvi put u životu susreo Nečastivoga), 1929
- The Career of Oliver Urban the Knight (Croatian: Karijera viteza Olivera Urbana), 1929
- The Great Wedding of the Župan of Klanfar (Croatian: Svadba velikog župana Klanfara), 1929
- A Funeral in Theresienburg (German: Beisetzung in Theresienburg, Croatian: Sprovod u Teresienburgu), 1929
- Klanfar in Varadijev (Croatian: Klanfar na Varadijevu), 1930
- The Young Man Puts His First Poem to the Test (Croatian: Mladić nosi svoje prve pjesme na ogled), 1930
- A Dubrovnikan Coulisse (Croatian: Dubrovačka kulisa), 1931
- The Song of the Bullfighter (Pjesma toreadora), 1931
- Leaves on a Distant Road (Croatian: Lišće na dalekom putu), 1931
- Autumn Loneliness (Croatian: Jesenja samoća), 1931
- A Naked Woman in an Old Photograph (Croatian: Gola žena na staroj slici), 1931
- A Book to Poems (Croatian: Knjiga pjesama), 1931
- A Man Walks to the City After His Own Death (Croatian: Čovjek poslije svoje smrti hoda gradom), 1931
- Diana in the City (Croatian: Dijana u gradu), 1931
- People in Darkness (Croatian: Ljudi u tmini), 1931
- The Evening Calm (Croatian: Bonaca u predvečerje), 1931
- Maršal Kuroki pokazuje međunarodnim atašeima kod svoga generalnog štaba bojište na Liaoyangu, u noći između drugog i trećeg septembra devet stotina i četvrte na punoj mjesečini, 1931
- A Pub at Harbor (Croatian: Krčma u luci), 1931
- Jerusalemite Dialogue (Croatian: Jeruzalemski dijalog), 1931
- The Lady Visits the Sick Children of Her Maidservant (Croatian: Gospođa u posjeti kod bolesnog djeteta svoje sluškinje), 1931
- Leda, 1932
- On the Glembays (Croatian: O Glembajevima), 1932
- Book of Lyrics (Croatian: Knjiga lirike), 1932
- The Return of Philip Latinowicz (Croatian: Povratak Filipa Latinovicza), 1932
- Legends (Croatian: Legende), 1933
- In the Camp (Croatian: U logoru), 1934
- Where Do These Cities Sail To? (Croatian: Kamo plove ovi gradovi?), 1934
- The Ballads of Petrica Kerempuh (Croatian: Balade Petrice Kerempuha), 1936
- Poems in Darkness (Croatian: Pjesme u tmini), 1936
- Novellas (Croatian: Novele), 1937
- Under the Mask (Croatian: Pod maskom), 1937
- Book of Prose (Croatian: Knjiga proze), 1938
- On the Edge of Reason (Croatian: Na rubu pameti), 1938
- The Banquet in Blitva (Croatian: Banket u Blitvi), 1938
- The Dialectal Antibarbarus (Croatian: Dijalektički antibarbarus), 1939
- The Great Crocodile, or a Conversation on Truth (Croatian: Krokodilina ili razgovor o istini), 1945
- Arete, or the Legend of a Handmaiden of God to a Bird of Paradise (Croatian: Aretej ili Legenda o Svetoj Ancili Rajskoj Ptici (Note: Arete is a direct borrowing from Ancient Greek: ᾰ̓ρετή, lit. 'goodness, virtue, excellence'.) (Note: Sveta Ancila, shown here in the dative case as svetoj ancili, is a half-loan from Latin: Ancilla Dei, lit. 'handmaid of God', referenced in letters by Augustine and used for deceased women of virtue.)), 1952
- A Yellow Ball (Croatian: Žuta lopta), 1952
- We Keep Watch (Croatian: Bdijemo), 1954
- One Rainy Day (Croatian: Jednog kišnog dana), 1954
- Musical Fantasy (French: Fantaisie musicale), 1954
- It Was Moonlight (Croatian: Bila je mjesečina), 1954
- The Banners (Croatian: Zastave), 1962
- Poetry (Croatian: Poezija), 1969
