= 1928 in literature =

This article contains information about the literary events and publications of 1928.

== Events ==
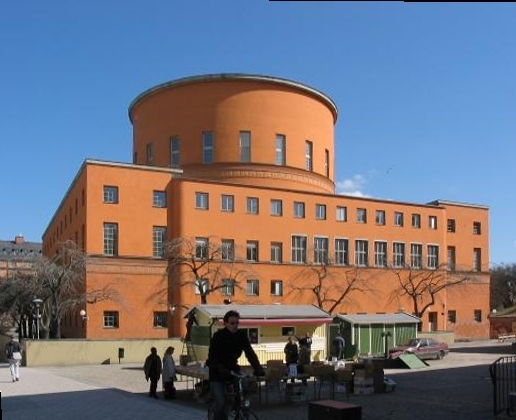
Stockholm Public Library

- January
  - The Soviet magazine Oktyabr begins publishing Mikhail Sholokhov's novel And Quiet Flows the Don («Тихий Дон», Tikhiy Don) in instalments.
  - Ford Madox Ford publishes Last Post in the U.K., as the last in his World War I tetralogy Parade's End, which has been appearing since 1924.
- January 16 – The English novelist and poet Thomas Hardy's ashes are interred in the Poets' Corner of Westminster Abbey, London. Pallbearers include Stanley Baldwin, J. M. Barrie, John Galsworthy, Edmund Gosse, A. E. Housman, Rudyard Kipling, Ramsay MacDonald and George Bernard Shaw. Meanwhile, Hardy's heart is interred where he wished to be buried, in the grave of his first wife, Emma, in the churchyard of his parish of birth, Stinsford ("Mellstock") in Dorset. Later in the year, his widow Florence publishes the first part of a biography, The Early Life of Thomas Hardy, 1840–1891 (Macmillan), in fact largely dictated by Hardy.
- February – Weird Tales magazine publishes H. P. Lovecraft's story "The Call of Cthulhu" in the United States.
- March 31 – Stockholm Public Library, designed by Gunnar Asplund, opens.
- April 19 – Publication of the Oxford English Dictionary is completed.
- Spring – George Orwell moves from London to Paris; his first articles as a professional writer appear later in the year.
- June – The literary magazine Contemporáneos is first published in Mexico by Jaime Torres Bodet, giving a name to the group Los Contemporáneos.
- June 27 – The English writer Evelyn Waugh marries Evelyn Gardner, daughter of Lady Winifred Burghclere, in St Paul's Church, Portman Square, London, with only Harold Acton, Alec Waugh (the author's brother) and Pansy Pakenham present. They move into a flat in Canonbury Square, Islington. In September the author's first completed novel, the satire Decline and Fall, is published by Chapman & Hall, of which his father, Arthur Waugh, is managing director. It is illustrated by the author. It reaches a third impression by the end of the year. The marriage lasts until the following September.
- July – D. H. Lawrence's Lady Chatterley's Lover is published in Florence. It will not be published unexpurgated in Britain until 1960.
- August 27 – Taibhdhearc na Gaillimhe in Galway is founded as the national Irish-language theater, opening with Micheál Mac Liammóir's version of Dhiarmada agus Ghráinne.
- August 31 – The Threepenny Opera (Die Dreigroschenoper), adapted by Bertolt Brecht, Elisabeth Hauptmann and composer Kurt Weill (with set designer Caspar Neher) from The Beggar's Opera, is launched at the Theater am Schiffbauerdamm in Berlin, with Harald Paulsen and Lotte Lenya in the principal rôles.
- September
  - S. S. Van Dine's "Twenty Rules for Writing Detective Stories" are published in The American Magazine.
  - Leslie Charteris's Meet the Tiger, the first adventure of Simon Templar ("the Saint"), is published in the U.K.. Charteris will write dozens of novels and stories with the character in 1928–1963; successor writers will continue until 1983.
- September 21 – The Gorseth Kernow is set up at Boscawen-Un in Cornwall by Henry Jenner (Gwas Myghal) and others.
- October
  - W. H. Auden goes to Berlin and is soon joined by Christopher Isherwood.
  - Luk Phu Chai (A Real Man), perhaps the first major original Thai novel, is published by Siburapha (Kulap Saipradit).
- October 14 – The Gate Theatre in Dublin is founded by English actors and lovers Micheál Mac Liammóir and Hilton Edwards, initially using the Abbey Theatre's Peacock studio to stage works by European and American dramatists.
- November–December – Erich Maria Remarque's antiwar novel All Quiet on the Western Front (Im Westen nichts Neues) appears in the German newspaper Vossische Zeitung. Hans Herbert Grimm's Schlump is also published (anonymously) by Kurt Wolff in Berlin this year.
- November 1 – Mustafa Kemal Atatürk, President of Turkey, introduces the Roman-based 29-letter Turkish alphabet to replace the Ottoman script as the official writing system for the Turkish language.
- November 6 – Xu Zhimo writes his poem 再別康橋 (Zài Bié Kāngqiáo, "On Leaving Cambridge Once More").
- November 9–16 – Radclyffe Hall's novel The Well of Loneliness, published on July 27 by Jonathan Cape in London with an appreciation by Havelock Ellis, is tried and convicted at Bow Street Magistrates' Court on the grounds of obscenity under the Hicklin test, for its theme of lesbian love, after a campaign against it by James Douglas in the Sunday Express. The presiding magistrate, Sir Chartres Biron, holds that the book contains "not one word which suggested that anyone with the horrible tendencies described was in the least degree blameworthy. All the characters in the book were presented as attractive people and put forward with admiration." Other lesbian literature published in England this year evades prosecution: Elizabeth Bowen's novel The Hotel, Virginia Woolf's fictional Orlando: A Biography, and Compton MacKenzie's satirical Extraordinary Women. Djuna Barnes' novel Ladies Almanack, published in Paris, also alludes to the controversy.
- December 9 – R. C. Sherriff's drama Journey's End, set on the Western Front (World War I), is premièred by the Incorporated Stage Society at the Apollo Theatre in London, with Laurence Olivier in a principal rôle.

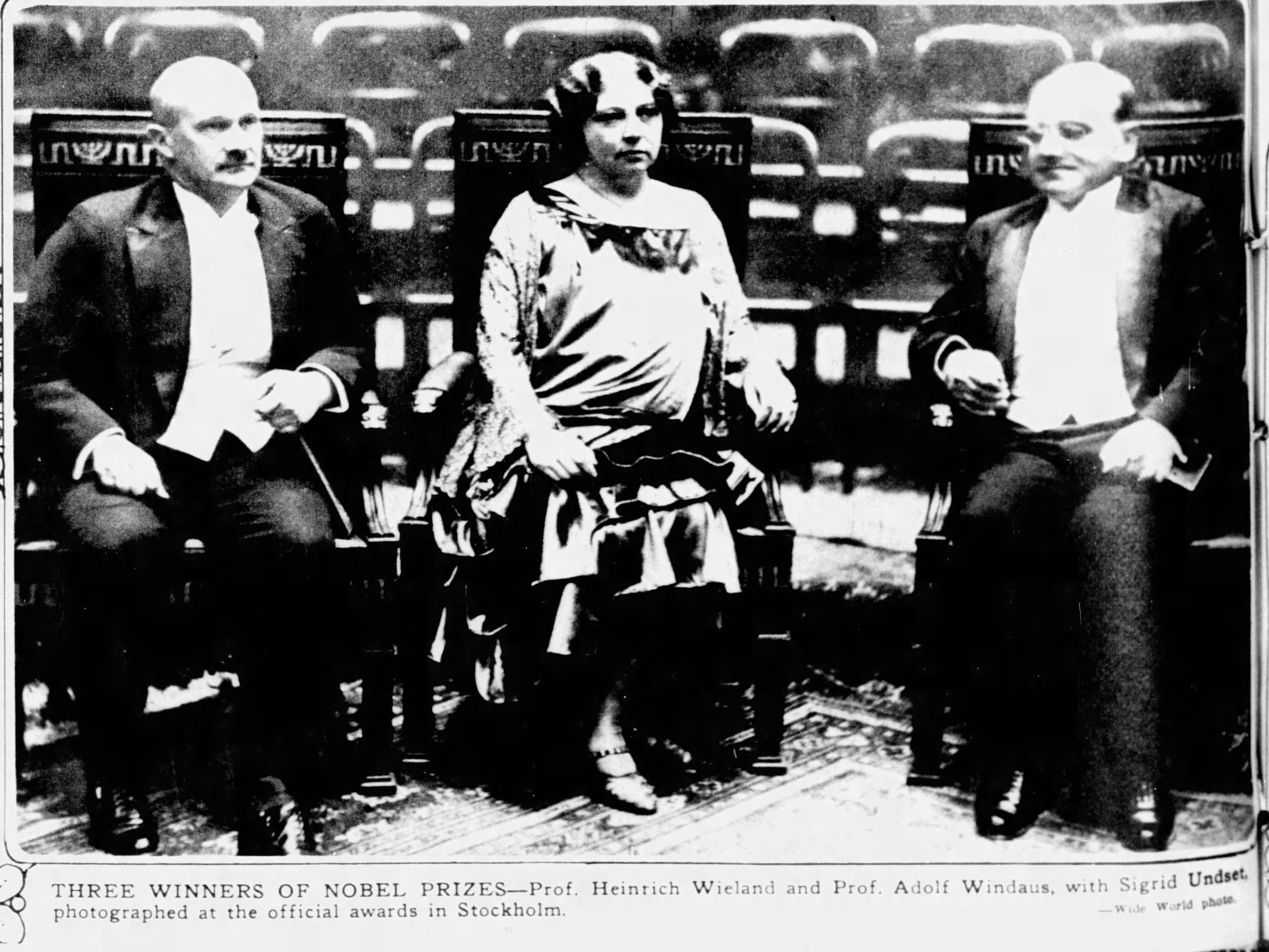
Sigrid Undset at the Nobel prize award ceremony in Stockholm on 10 December 1928.

- December 10 – Danish-born Norwegian novelist Sigrid Undset is awarded the Nobel Prize in Literature "principally for her powerful descriptions of Northern life during the Middle Ages."
- December 19 – Italo Svevo (Aron Schmitz), returning from an Alpine resort to Trieste, suffers a car accident. He dies next day leaving his novel Il Vegliardo (The Old Man) unfinished in mid-word.
- unknown dates
  - Bibhutibhushan Bandyopadhyay's novel Pather Panchali first appears as a serial in a Calcutta periodical.
  - The clerihew, a comic pseudo-biographical verse form associated with Edmund Clerihew Bentley, is first mentioned in print.
  - It is claimed that one in four of all secular books printed and sold in England this year are the work of Edgar Wallace.

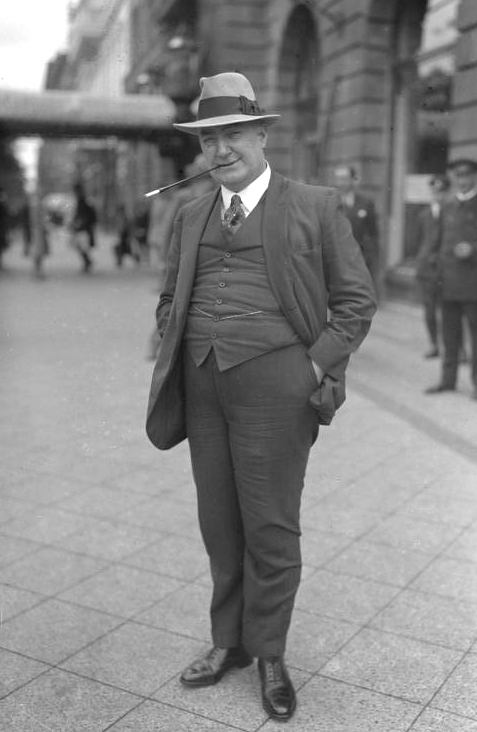
Edgar Wallace with trademark trilby hat and cigarette holder at the height of his success in 1928

== New books ==
=== Fiction ===
- Leslie Barringer – Joris of the Rock
- Vicki Baum – Helene Willfüer, Student of Chemistry
- Marjorie Bowen – General Crack
- André Breton – Nadja
- Lynn Brock – The Slip-Carriage Mystery
- Mary Butts – Armed with Madness
- Ferreira de Castro – Emigrantes (Emigrants)
- Agatha Christie – The Mystery of the Blue Train
- G.D.H. Cole and Margaret Cole – The Man from the River
- Colette – Break of Day (La Naissance du jour)
- J.J. Connington
  - Mystery at Lynden Sands
  - The Case with Nine Solutions
- Freeman Wills Crofts – The Sea Mystery
- Clemence Dane – Enter Sir John
- Frank Parker Day – Rockbound
- Franklin W. Dixon – Hunting for Hidden Gold
- Jessie Redmon Fauset – Plum Bun: A Novel Without a Moral
- Esther Forbes – A Mirror for Witches
- Rosita Forbes – King's Mate
- Ford Madox Ford – Last Post
- E. M. Forster – The Eternal Moment and Other Stories
- R. Austin Freeman – As a Thief in the Night
- August Gailit – Toomas Nipernaadi
- Anthony Gilbert – The Murder of Mrs. Davenport
- Maxim Gorky – The Life of Klim Samgin (second volume, translated as The Magnet; «Жизнь Клима Самгина», Zhizn', Klima Samgina)
- Reşat Nuri Güntekin – Yeşil Gece
- Radclyffe Hall – The Well of Loneliness
- Thea von Harbou – The Rocket to the Moon
- Georgette Heyer – The Masqueraders
- James Hilton – The Silver Flame
- Sydney Horler – The Curse of Doone
- Aldous Huxley – Point Counter Point
- Ilf and Petrov – The Twelve Chairs («Двенадцать стульев», Dvenadtsat stulyev)
- Mikheil Javakhishvili – Givi Shaduri (გივი შადური)
- Joseph Kessel – Belle de Jour
- Ronald Knox –The Footsteps at the Lock
- Kwee Tek Hoay – Drama dari Krakatau (serialization)
- Selma Lagerlöf – Anna Svärd
- Nella Larsen – Quicksand
- D. H. Lawrence – Lady Chatterley's Lover
- Claude McKay – Home To Harlem
- Wyndham Lewis - The Childermass: Section I
- Compton Mackenzie – Extremes Meet
- W. Somerset Maugham – Ashenden: Or the British Agent
- Abdul Muis – Salah Asuhan
- Dhan Gopal Mukerji – Gay Neck, the Story of a Pigeon
- Vladimir Nabokov (as V. Sirin) – King, Queen, Knave («Король, дама, валет», Korol', dama, valet)
- Baroness Orczy – Skin o' My Tooth
- Anthony Powell – The Barnard Letters
- Premchand – Nirmala
- Jenaro Prieto – The Partner
- Erich Maria Remarque – All Quiet on the Western Front
- Siegfried Sassoon – Memoirs of a Fox-Hunting Man (anonymous in 1st impression)
- Dorothy L. Sayers
  - Lord Peter Views the Body
  - The Unpleasantness at the Bellona Club
- Arthur Schnitzler – Therese
- Nan Shepherd – The Quarry Wood
- Cecil Street – The Murders in Praed Street
- Păstorel Teodoreanu – Hronicul Măscăriciului Vălătuc
- S. S. Van Dine
  - The Greene Murder Case
  - The Bishop Murder Case
- Henry Wade – The Missing Partners
- Hugh Walpole – Wintersmoon
- Mika Waltari – Suuri illusioni
- Evelyn Waugh – Decline and Fall
- H. G. Wells – Mr. Blettsworthy on Rampole Island
- Franz Werfel – Class Reunion (Der Abituriententag)
- Valentine Williams – The Crouching Beast
- Virginia Woolf – Orlando: A Biography
- S. Fowler Wright – Deluge
- Francis Brett Young
  - The Key of Life
  - My Brother Jonathan

=== Children and young people ===
- Edgar Rice Burroughs – Tarzan, Lord of the Jungle
- Wanda Gág – Millions of Cats
- A. A. Milne – The House at Pooh Corner
- Felix Salten – Bambi, A Life in the Woods (Bambi. Eine Lebensgeschichte aus dem Walde, 1923)
- Ruth Plumly Thompson – The Giant Horse of Oz

=== Drama ===
- Jacinto Benavente – Pepa Doncel
- Charles Bennett
  - Blackmail
  - The Last Hour
- Bertolt Brecht – The Threepenny Opera
- Joe Corrie – In Time o' Strife
- Eduardo De Filippo – Filosoficamente
- Nikolai Erdman – The Suicide («Самоубийца», written)
- Marieluise Fleißer – Pioneers in Ingolstadt (Pioniere in Ingolstadt)
- Garrett Fort – Jarnegan
- Agha Hashar Kashmiri – Sita Banbas (published)
- Kwee Tek Hoay (郭德懷)– Korbannja Yi Yong Toen (Victims of Yi Yong Toen, published serially)
- Patrick Hastings – The Moving Finger
- Monckton Hoffe – Many Waters
- Daniil Kharms – Elizabeth Bam («Елизавета Бам»)
- Miroslav Krleža – The Glembays (Gospoda Glembajevi)
- John Howard Lawson – The International
- Alexander Lernet-Holenia, as Clemens Neydisser, and Stefan Zweig – Gelegenheit macht Liebe (Opportunity creates love) or Quiproquo
- Federico García Lorca – The Love of Don Perlimplín and Belisa in the Garden (Amor de Don Perlimplín con Belisa en su jardín, written)
- Walter Hackett – Other Men's Wives
- W. Somerset Maugham – The Sacred Flame
- Ivor Novello – The Truth Game
- Eugene O'Neill – Strange Interlude
- Eugen Ortner – Meier Helmbrecht
- Ouyang Yuqian (欧阳予倩) – Pan Jinlian (潘金蓮)
- R. C. Sherriff – Journey's End
- Ben Travers – Plunder
- Sophie Treadwell – Machinal
- John Van Druten – The Return of the Soldier
- Louis Verneuil – Monsieur Lamberthier
- Roger Vitrac – Victor, or Power to the Children (Victor, ou les enfants au pouvoir)
- Edgar Wallace
  - The Lad
  - The Man Who Changed His Name
  - The Squeaker
- Carl Zuckmayer – Katharina Knie

=== Poetry ===
- Stephen Vincent Benét – John Brown's Body
- Robert Frost – West-Running Brook
- Robinson Jeffers – Cawdor
- Federico García Lorca – Gypsy Ballads (Romancero Gitano)
- Siegfried Sassoon – The Heart's Journey

=== Non-fiction ===
- Max Aitken – Politicians and the War
- Clive Bell – Civilization: An Essay
- Edmund Blunden – Undertones of War (autobiography)
- Hall Caine – Recollections of Rossetti (second expanded version)
- Julius Evola – Imperialismo Pagano (Pagan Imperialism)
- Sidney Bradshaw Fay – Origins of the World War
- Dion Fortune – Esoteric Orders and Their Work
- Harold Lloyd – An American Comedy (autobiography)
- Dora Marsden – The Definition of the Godhead
- Margaret Mead – Coming of Age in Samoa
- Paul Morand – Black Magic
- Tomas O'Crohan – Allagar na h-Inise (Island Cross-Talk)
- Edgar Wallace – The Trial of Patrick Herbert Mahon
- H. G. Wells – The Open Conspiracy
- Stefan Zweig – Drei Dichter ihres Lebens. Casanova – Stendhal – Tolstoi (Adepts in Self-Portraiture: Casanova, Stendhal, Tolstoy)

== Births ==
- January 1 – Iain Crichton Smith, Scottish writer (died 1998)
- January 7 – William Peter Blatty, American novelist and screenwriter (died 2017)
- January 8 – Sander Vanocur, American journalist (died 2019)
- January 9 – Judith Krantz, American novelist (died 2019)
- January 10 – Philip Levine, American poet (died 2015)
- January 16 – William Kennedy, American writer and journalist
- January 17 – Roman Frister, Polish writer (died 2015)
- January 21 – János Kornai (as János Kornfelder), Hungarian economist (died 2021)
- January 24 – Desmond Morris, English anthropologist and writer (died 2026)
- February 5 – Andrew Greeley, Irish-American priest and novelist (died 2013)
- February 9
  - Frank Frazetta, American illustrator (died 2010)
  - Roger Mudd, American journalist (died 2021)
- February 13 – Refik Erduran, Turkish playwright, columnist and writer (died 2017)
- February 15 – Norman Bridwell, American author and illustrator, created Clifford the Big Red Dog (died 2014)
- February 19 – Onuora Nzekwu, Nigerian writer (died 2017)
- February 25 – Richard G. Stern, American novelist and educator (died 2013)
- February 28 – Walter Tevis, American novelist (died 1984)
- February 29 – Jean Adamson, English children's author and illustrator (died 2024)
- March 4 – Alan Sillitoe, English novelist (died 2010)
- March 12 – Edward Albee, American dramatist (died 2016)
- March 13 – Jane Grigson, English cookery writer (died 1990)
- March 22 – E. D. Hirsch, American academic literary critic and educator
- March 30 – Tom Sharpe, English satirical author (died 2013)
- April 4 – Maya Angelou, American poet (died 2014)
- April 7 – Alan J. Pakula, American screenwriter (died 1998)
- April 11 – Lionel Abrahams, South African novelist, poet and essayist (died 2004)
- April 17 – Cynthia Ozick, American author
- April 24 – Martin Seymour-Smith, English poet, biographer and critic (died 1998)
- May 4 – Thomas Kinsella, Irish poet (died 2021)
- May 24 – William Trevor, Irish fiction writer and playwright (died 2016)
- June 10 – Maurice Sendak, American children's author and illustrator (died 2012)
- June 28 – Stan Barstow, English novelist (died 2011)
- July 11 – Jane Gardam, English writer of fiction and literary critic (died 2025)
- July 16
  - Anita Brookner, English novelist (died 2016)
  - Robert Sheckley, American writer (died 2005)
- July 18 – Simon Vinkenoog, Dutch writer, Poet Laureate of the Netherlands (d. 2009)
- July 19 – Samuel John Hazo, American author
- July 24 – Griselda Gambaro, Argentine writer
- July 26 – Bernice Rubens, Welsh novelist (died 2004)
- August 7 – Anthony Lejeune, English writer, editor and broadcaster (died 2018)
- August 12 – Beni Virtzberg, Israeli forester, Holocaust survivor and writer (died 1968)
- September 6 – Robert M. Pirsig, American philosopher and author (died 2017)
- September 11 – William X. Kienzle, American priest and author (died 2001)
- September 18 – Sigrid Kahle, Swedish journalist and writer (died 2013)
- September 20 – Donald Hall, American poet and poet laureate (died 2018)
- September 30 – Elie Wiesel, American Jewish author and 1986 Nobel Peace Prize winner (died 2016)
- October 2 – Zora Tavčar, Slovenian writer and translator
- October 3 – Alvin Toffler, American futurist writer (died 2016)
- October 7 – Sohrab Sepehri, Persian poet and painter (died 1980)
- October 10 – Sheila F. Walsh, English novelist (died 2009)
- October 17 – Rosemary Tonks, English poet, prose writer and children's writer (died 2014)
- October 21 – Yu Guangzhong, Taiwanese writer, poet, educator and critic (died 2017)
- October 27 – Gilles Vigneault, Canadian singer and poet
- November 2 – Paul Johnson, English historian and journalist (died 2023)
- November 9 – Anne Sexton, American poet (died 1974)
- November 11 – Carlos Fuentes, Mexican writer (died 2012)
- November 12 – Marjorie W. Sharmat, American children's writer (died 2019)
- November 20 – Dolf Verroen, Dutch writer of children's literature
- November 28 – Bano Qudsia, Punjab-born Pakistani fiction writer (died 2017)
- December 3
  - Karin Bang, Norwegian novelist and poet (died 2017)
  - Barbara Probst Solomon, American author, essayist and journalist (died 2019)
- December 16 – Philip K. Dick, American science fiction author (died 1982)
- December 31 – Veijo Meri, Finnish writer (died 2015)

== Deaths ==
- January 8 – Juan B. Justo, Argentine journalist (born 1865)
- January 11 – Thomas Hardy, English novelist and poet (born 1840)
- January 19 – Hans Hinrich Wendt, German theologian (born 1853)
- January 28 – Vicente Blasco Ibáñez, Spanish novelist, journalist and politician (born 1867)
- February 19 – Mildred Aldrich, American journalist (born 1853)
- February 29 – Adolphe Appia, Swiss writer and scenery and lighting designer (born 1862)
- March 4 – Paul Sabatier, French religious writer (born 1858)
- March 18 – Paul van Ostaijen, Flemish poet (born 1896)
- March 24
  - Didrik Hegermann Grønvold, Norwegian novelist (born 1855)
  - Charlotte Mew, English poet (born 1869; suicide)
- April 10 – Stanley J. Weyman, English novelist (born 1855)
- April 19 – Ladislav Klíma, Czech novelist and philosopher (born 1878)
- May 5 – Barry Pain, English writer (born 1864)
- May 16 – Edmund Gosse, English poet and critic (born 1849)
- May 19 – Max Scheler, German philosopher (born 1874)
- May 22 – Francisco López Merino, Argentine poet (suicide, born 1904)
- May 25 – George Ranetti, Romanian humorist and playwright (born 1875)
- July 1 – Avery Hopwood, American playwright (heart attack, born 1882)
- July 8 – Crystal Eastman, American journalist (born 1881)
- August – Isaac Markens, American journalist (born 1846)
- August 16 – Antonín Sova, Czech poet (born 1864)
- August 17 – Sir George Trevelyan, 2nd Baronet, British statesman and author (born 1838)
- August 3 – Oskar Jerschke, German dramatist (born 1861)
- October 24 – Henry Festing Jones, English biographer, editor and lawyer (born 1851)
- December 1 – José Eustasio Rivera, Colombian writer (born 1888)
- December 13 – Joseph Bucklin Bishop, American journalist and publisher (born 1847)
- December 16 – Elinor Wylie, American poet and novelist (stroke, born 1885)
- December 19 – Italo Svevo, Italian writer (born 1861)
- December 23 – Ludwig Rosenthal, German antiquarian bookseller (born 1840)

== Awards ==
- James Tait Black Memorial Prize for fiction: Siegfried Sassoon, Memoirs of a Fox-Hunting Man
- James Tait Black Memorial Prize for biography: John Buchan, Montrose
- Newbery Medal for children's literature: Dhan Gopal Mukerji, Gayneck, the Story of a Pigeon
- Nobel Prize for Literature: Sigrid Undset
- Prix Goncourt: Maurice Constantin-Weyer, Un Homme se penche sur son passé
- Pulitzer Prize for Drama: Eugene O'Neill, Strange Interlude
- Pulitzer Prize for Poetry: Edwin Arlington Robinson, Tristram
- Pulitzer Prize for the Novel: Thornton Wilder, The Bridge of San Luis Rey
