= Man of the Forest =

Man of the Forest may refer to:

- Man of the Forest (novel), a 1920 novel by Zane Grey
- Man of the Forest (1921 film), an American film
- Man of the Forest (1926 film), an American Western silent film
- Man of the Forest (1933 film), an American pre-Code film
- "Man of the Forest" (story), a story by Mikheil Javakhishvili

== See also ==
- Men of the Forest, a 1952 documentary film
- "The Man from the Forest", an episode of the television series Der Pass
