= Arsena of Marabda =

1933 novel by Mikheil Javakhishvili

- Author: Mikheil Javakhishvili
- Original title: არსენა მარაბდელი
- Language: Georgian
- Genre: Historical fiction
- Publication date: 1933
- Publication place: Georgia
- Media type: Print (hardback)
- Pages: 600 pages

Arsena of Marabda (Georgian: არსენა მარაბდელი; Arsena Marabdeli) is a novel by Georgian novelist Mikheil Javakhishvili. Its first part was published in the magazine Mnatobi (in 1926). During his life, it was published as a book, in 1933. It took the author 7 years to complete this novel. This novel, which depicts social problems in the early 19th century of Georgia, is reputed to be one of the best novels of the author.

== Plot ==
The novel has been published during the writer's lifetime with three parts. It was translated into several languages, including German and Russian. The novel reflects people's struggle for national and social independence. The hero of the book is Arsena Odzelashvili – a Georgian Robin hood. Soviet union's attitude toward him hardened after publishing this novel. The novel shows Georgian people's struggle for national and social freedom for the first half of the 20th century.

== Characters ==
The hero of the book is Arsena Odzelashvili - Georgian Robin hood. Arsena Odzelashvili commonly known as Arsena of Marabda (c. 1797 – 1842) was a Georgian outlaw said to have robbed the rich to help the poor. He gained popularity as a fighter against serfdom and Russian colonial rule in Georgia.
