= White collar =

White collar may refer to:

- White-collar worker, a professional who performs office-based or similar service-based jobs, as opposed to a blue-collar worker, whose job requires manual labor
- White-collar boxing
- White-collar crime, a non-violent crime, generally for personal gain and often involving money
- White Collar: The American Middle Classes, a study of the American middle class by sociologist C. Wright Mills
- White Collar (TV series), a police-procedural, dramatic television series starring Matt Bomer that premiered on the USA Network in 2009
- "White Collar", an episode of the sitcom The King of Queens
- The White Collar (novel), by Mikheil Javakhishvili
