= Mgaloblishvili =

Mgaloblishvili (Georgian: მგალობლიშვილი) is a Georgian surname. It may refer to:

- Grigol Mgaloblishvili (born 1973), Georgian politician and diplomat
- Nodar Mgaloblishvili (1931–2019), Soviet Georgian theatrical and cinema actor
