= Nodar Mgaloblishvili =

Georgian actor (1931–2019)

Mgaloblishvili in 2008

Nodar Mgaloblishvili (Russian: Нодар Мгалоблишвили, Georgian: ნოდარ მგალობლიშვილი, July 15, 1931 in Tbilisi, Georgian SSR, Soviet Union – March 26, 2019 in Tbilisi) was a Soviet and Georgian theatrical and cinema actor.

== Biography ==
In 1954 Nodar Mgaloblishvili graduated from the Shota Rustaveli Theatre and Film University. The same year he started to work in Marjanishvili Theatre as an actor. Meritorious Artist of Georgia (1976), People's Artist of the Georgian SSR (1979), winner of Hungary Drama and Music Festival (1976), he is best known for his portrayal of Count Cagliostro in Formula of Love directed by Mark Zakharov.

Mgaloblishvili lived and worked in Tbilisi, Georgia.

== Selected filmography ==
- Centaurs (1978) as minister Miguel
- Jaqo's Dispossessed (1980, TV Movie) as Teimuraz Eristavi
- Formula of Love (1984) as Alessandro Cagliostro
- Katala (1989) as Director
- Spetsnaz (2002) as Bearded
- Inspection (Azerbaijani: Yoxlama; 2006, TV series) as Lame man
- A Second Before... (2007, TV Series) as The Devil
