= Petrica Kerempuh =

Croatian folk hero

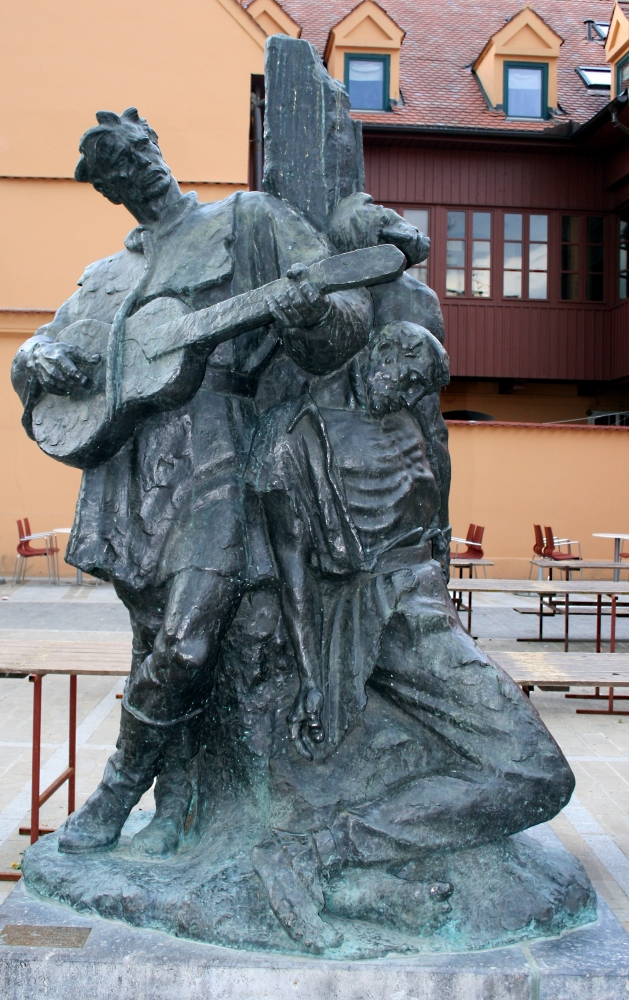
Statue of Petrica Kerempuh by the sculptor Vanja Radauš, erected in 1955

Petrica Kerempuh (Croatian pronunciation: [pětrit͡sa kêrempuːx]) is a literary character who appears in a number of Croatian and former Yugoslav works, most famously appearing in The Ballads of Petrica Kerempuh (Croatian: Balade Petrice Kerempuha) by Miroslav Krleža. In Croatian literature, Petrica Kerempuh is typically portrayed as a prophet of the people and a cynical commentator on contemporary events who ridicules the powerful.

== Origin ==
The name is derived from the dialectical word kerempuh, meaning 'belly', 'offal', or 'abdomen', with a figurative meaning suggesting a person of cunning or a merrymaker. It is thought to be of Hungarian origin.

The earliest origins of the character appear to be from a printing of Petrica Kerempuh iliti čini i življenje človeka prokšenoga ('Petrica Kerempuh or the Life of a Prodigal Man') by Jakob Lovrenčić in 1834, which is a translation of a German book on the travels and adventures of Till Eulenspiegel.

== Croatian literature ==
Beginning in the 1860s, while writing for Pozor in Prague, August Šenoa wrote many of his essays using Petrica Kerempuh as a pseudonym.

In 1936, Krleža published The Ballads of Petrica Kerempuh in Ljubljana and found critical acclaim across Yugoslavia. The book went on to be considered an important work in 20th-century Central European literature, emblematic of the best the region had to offer. Through the character, Krleža voiced his opposition to the centuries-old oppression of the people. Kerempuh is often considered to be a Zagorje version of the original Till Eulenspiegel tales, as well as the Hungarian tales of Mátyás Garabonciás Diák, which were worked on by the Croatian author Tituš Brezovački.

Another example of the character appears in Dragutin Domjanić's lesser-known puppet show Petrica Kerempuh i spametni osel ('Petrica Kerempuh and the Smart Ass'), in which he critically and satirically describes Croatian intellectuals of the 1920s. Apart from being a literary character, Petrica Kerempuh has also been utilized in theater.

== Legacy ==
Because of Kerempuh's popularity in literary Croatian, especially that of Kajkavian-speaking parts of the country, the term has been used metonymically to impart a satirical or humorous nature. Kerempuh was a satirical weekly newspaper in Zagreb that ran from 1945 until 1958 and later was a part of the Sunday edition of Vjesnik until 1965. Also in Zagreb is the Satirical Theatre Kerempuh, named after the character.

Today, there is a sculpture of Petrica Kerempuh by the sculptor Vanja Radauš, erected in 1955, located at Dolac Market in Zagreb. North of Dolac is Petrica Kerempuh's Square, where flowers are typically sold.

== Gallery ==
| Miroslav Krleža – author "Balada Petrice Kerempuha" | Petrica's likeness in Gornja Stubica |
