= Satirical Theatre Kerempuh =

Theatre in Zagreb, Croatia

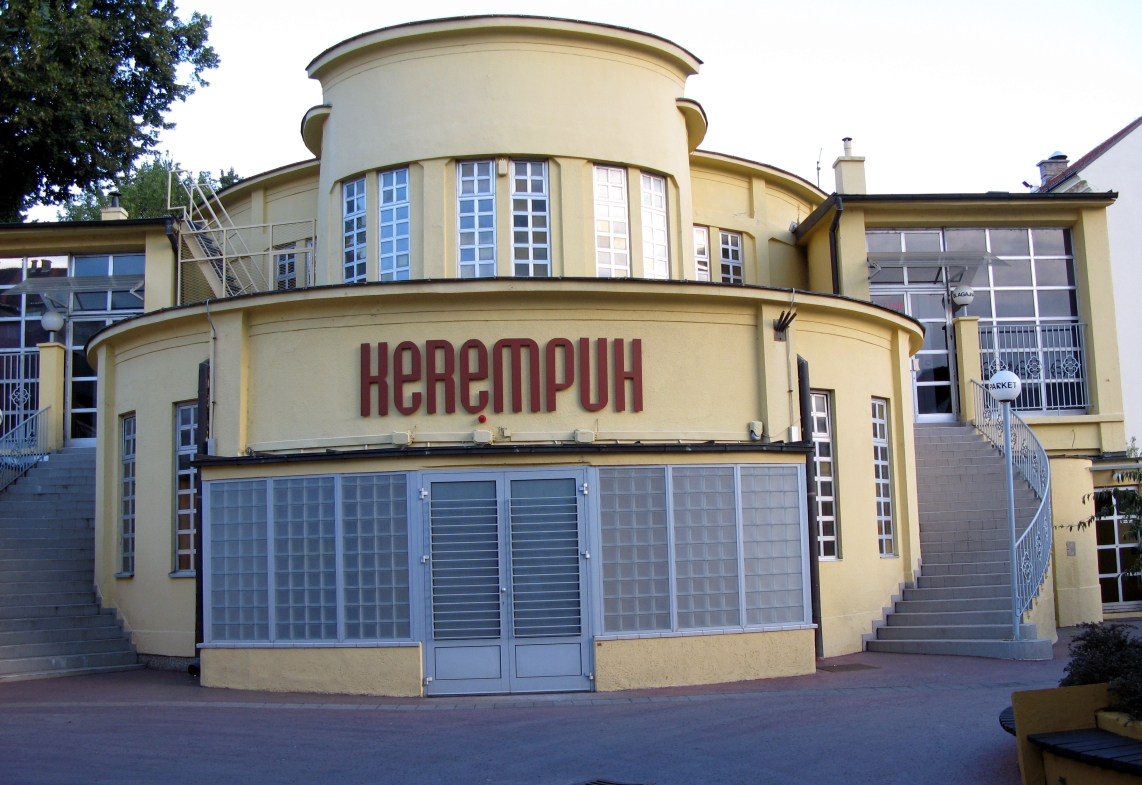
The theatre in 2007

Satirical Theatre Kerempuh (Croatian: Satiričko kazalište Kerempuh) or Kerempuh Theatre, is a theatre in Zagreb, Croatia founded in 1964 by the notable theatre and movie director Fadil Hadžić. It is located on a slope behind Ilica street 31.

== History and specifications ==
It was originally founded in 1964 by Fadil Hadžić as a cabaret under the name "Jazavac", the word for badger, an animal known for being cunning as well as the titular hero of Petar Kočić's 1904 satirical classic Badger before the Court. It is a 600 seats satirical theatre named after Petrica Kerempuh, a Croatian folk hero that ridicules the powerful. It was renamed Kerempuh in 1994. The plays are original productions or adaptations of authors such as Miro Gavran, Mate Matišić, Fadil Hadžić, Goran Vojnović and include actors and directors such as Tarik Filipović, Hrvoje Kečkeš, Mario Kovač, Vinko Brešan and Oliver Frljić.
