= Kvachi Kvachantiradze =

1924 novel by Mikheil Javakhishvili

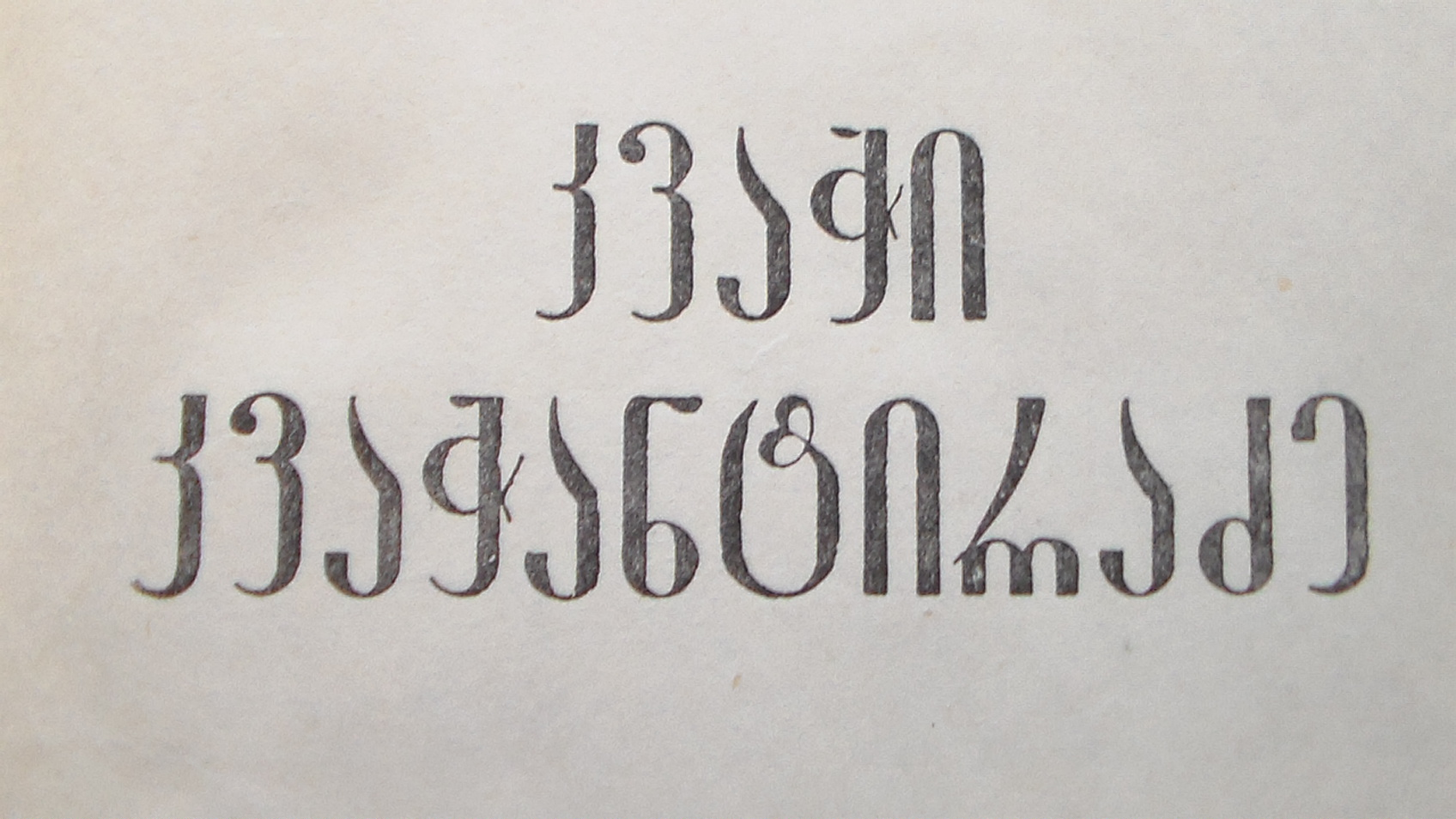
- Author: Mikheil Javakhishvili
- Original title: კვაჭი კვაჭანტირაძე
- Translator: Donald Rayfield
- Language: Georgian
- Series: Georgian Literature Series
- Genre: Novel Picaresque novel Grotesque
- Publisher: Dalkey Archive Press
- Publication date: 1924
- Publication place: Georgia
- Media type: Print (hardback)
- Pages: 512 pages
- ISBN: 1564788792

Kvachi Kvachantiradze (Georgian: კვაჭი კვაჭანტირაძე), translated into English as Kvachi: A Novel, is a novel written by Mikheil Javakhishvili in 1924. It was translated by Donald Rayfield in 2015. This is the best-known picaresque novel written in Georgia.

== History ==
This book was originally a collection of sketches. Javakhishvili decided in 1924 to rework it into a novel, which was published in 1925. As it glorified pre-war France and condemned the Russian Revolution and the Soviet invasion of Georgia, a new version was issued in 1934, heavily censored by the Soviet authorities. Even in 2011, the reissue only used the 1934 text, not the 1925 one. This translation uses the 1925 text.

== Plot ==
The hero of this book, Kvachi Kvachantiradze, is a thoroughly scurrilous rogue but, like many a literary rogue, a charming one. He charms us and he charms the people he meets, who seem to be not only unaware of his treachery but even thank him for his help. The book starts with the day of his birth, an auspicious day. There is a heavy thunderstorm. A tree is broken in two by lightning and the only other inn in town, a rival of the inn of Kvachi's father, Silibistro, is destroyed. The baby Kvachi is born already uttering the word me. A fortune teller forecasts that he will be a great man, get what he wants and bring fortune to his family. Apart from a brief digression about how his parents came to marry (they are cousins), we immediately follow Kvachi's early life. He is a very precocious child, walking and talking early, and helping in his parents' inn.

Silibistro is snobbish and is certain that he descends from nobles but cannot prove it. He spends a fortune on doing so, till he finally gets a man to issue him with a certificate of nobility. The man is a notorious swindler but Silibistro is happy with his certificate and becomes even more snobbish. Kvachi is sent to Kutaisi (the second largest city in Georgia) to study and it is here that he develops his sharp ways. He stays with a couple, he an elderly man, she, Tsviri, much younger. As they do not have a child of their own, Tsviri starts mothering him but, as he gets older, mothering becomes loving and he becomes her lover, for which she gives him gifts. Little does she know that she is not the first but she soon finds out that he sees (and is paid by) other women. Kvachi is very astute with money. He borrows at an opportune moment, promising to repay promptly but, of course, never does. When someone is short, he offers to lend them money but never does.

From earning money as a gigolo, Kvachi and his friends, soon upgrade to extortion and are indifferent as to whom they extort from, including poor widows. Eventually, he makes enough money to get his parents a house, while he moves off to Odessa, nominally to study law. He does start studying but, as Javakhishvili points out, Georgians are easily distracted and lazy and all they really want to do is to carouse, which they do. He still carries on his various methods of extortion, becoming more sophisticated in his approach.

Women continue to be his weak spot. He falls in love with Mme Lapoche (i.e. French for The Pocket) and gives her many presents but she and her husband are smarter than Kvachi. He tries selling stoves and then insurance (which, of course, leads to an insurance scam.) The gang moves to St Petersburg, where he has more trouble with women, almost raping a young woman who resists his charms. He even manages to meet Rasputin but is then horrified, when his latest girlfriend would rather sleep with Rasputin than with him. However, he gains Rasputin's confidence and thus access to the Tsar, which allows hm to perpetrate a whole range of scams.

Soon he is off again, travelling around Europe - to Warsaw, Vienna, Paris and ending up in London, where money and scams keep him busy. By the start of World War I, he is back in Russia where we learn, though history has kept silent about it, he is responsible for killing Rasputin and starting both the February and October Russian revolutions. He joins the Reds and the Whites, sometimes both on the same day. It is not surprising that the Soviets objected to this book. He becomes much involved in both revolutions though not forgetting to make large sums of money for himself. Inevitably, things do not always go well.

== Characters ==
- Kvachi Kvachantiradze - The "hero" of this book.
- Silibistro Kvachantiradze - Kvachi's father.
- Pupi - Kvachi's mother.
- Notio - Kvachi's grandmother.
- Khukhu - Kvachi's grandfather.
- Budu Sholia - Owner of inn in Kutaisi
- Tsviri - Budus wife.
- Beso Shiqia - Kvachi's friend.
- Jalil - Kvachi's friend.
- Grigori Rasputin - Russian peasant, mystical faith healer and a trusted friend to the family of Nicholas II, the last Tsar of Russia. He became friend of Kvachi.
- Ladi Chikinjiladze - Kvachi's friend.
- Rebeca - Kvachi's Women.
- Elene - Kvachi's Women.
- Madame Lapoche - Kvachi's Women.

== Structure and themes ==
=== Kvachi Kvachantiradze ===
Kvachi is a picaresque novel chronicling the adventures of Kvachi Kvachantiradze in early twentieth-century Georgia, Russia, and beyond. The setting and historical period - spanning the First World War, the Russian Revolution and civil war, and the early Soviet Union - were also depicted by numerous Russian and Soviet authors of the era, though the Georgian perspective is less common, and Javakhishvili (who was executed under Stalin's regime in 1937) offers his own approach to the material. Kvachi was described as precocious as an infant, with high expectations placed upon him, though he frequently deceived those who trusted his claims. Viewing Georgia as offering limited prospects - remarking, "Georgia is too small to contain me" - he gradually distanced himself from it, returning only briefly while seeking greater opportunities in Russia. Russia also provided broader scope for his primary skill of conning people, as its larger population offered more anonymity than Georgia. Following several early schemes at home, Kvachi attempted a conventional path by studying law in Odessa. Although he and his companions initially applied themselves to their studies, their enthusiasm gradually declined. Before long, Kvachi began working as an insurance salesman, a role suited to his abilities.

He persisted, he pestered, he pursued, he wore his victim down and, once he had marked him out, gave him no rest until he had signed him up and tied him down.

— Mikheil Javakhishvili, Kvachi Kvachantiradze

=== Business ===
He even insures his father – and has him fake his death – in an elaborate final con to fleece his own employer, once he's ready to move on. From Odessa Kvachi heads to the Russian capital, Petersburg, where he live it up in high style; his financial wheeling and dealing make for his reputation, as one magazine puts it, of: "Our Morgan" (as in J.P.). Yes, "Kvachi the businessman, Kvachi the financier, Kvachi the shareholder" enjoys great success – for a while. But, as happens repeatedly, his whole house of cards collapses. Kvachi's life is all about cash-flow. He goes for – and often achieves – the big coups, but he's not particularly good at actually handling money. He burns through vast amounts of it – whatever is at hand, regardless of how much. He enjoys the high-life – as high as he can get away with – but lives only for the day, making little effort at proper investment or management. Easy come, easy go, indeed. Kvachi is actually very generous, too – always throwing money around, when he has it (and sometimes throwing it around when he doesn't – he's generous with other people's money, too) – but it is an unsustainable lifestyle. Not that he seems to mind the repeated collapse of his fortunes – not that he should, maybe: he always has the next con up his sleeve. Eventually he even takes Europe and America by storm – he even: "tried out the geishas" in Japan --, leaving city after "kvachified" city in his wake:

From now on Kvachi Kvachantiradze, under a dozen different surnames, was racing around the world. Sometimes he was Prince Bagration, sometimes the Afghan emir's son, sometimes Count Tishkevich, sometimes a Persian Qajar prince. Who can assess or describe his sleight of hand, his versatile handiwork, his subtlety and acuteness.

— Mikheil Javakhishvili, Kvachi Kvachantiradze

=== Rasputin ===
Javakhishvili gives it a go, though this is a novel that races about as well, often only skimming the surface of Kvachi's cons, and even describing the more elaborate ones quickly. What others would use to fill an entire stand-alone book – such as Kvachi and his buddies convincing a bank and the police that they are filmmakers, making preparations to film a bank-robbery scene, and then using that as cover to actually rob the bank – here are just another in the very quick succession of harebrained (yet often successful) cons Kvachi pulls off. Kvachi remains almost always focused on the next big con, with a bit of seduction and taking care of his friends and family on the side. He admits: "History's never been my thing", but he lives in times when history can't be ignored, and he gets pulled in too. He befriends, of all people, an even larger-than-life figure than he is, Rasputin, whose proximity to and influence with the royals is obviously something Kvachi finds hard to resist. As Javakhishvili has it, Kvachi plays a significant role in some of Rasputin's doings – as well as in his end. It doesn't end there, either, as Russia's descent into the First World War and then into revolution and civil war chaos also draw Kvachi in. Indeed, Javakhishvili claims nothing less for his hero than:

Read modern history, in print or not: you won't be able to read in any book, newspaper, or manuscript even two words about Kvachi's exploits in Russia's great revolution. True, historians do concede, but only in private conversation, that Kvachi helped with money and advice, but they have denied outright the most important fact: that Kvachi gave the signal for revolution and issued the unforgettable order: "Begin !"

— Mikheil Javakhishvili, Kvachi Kvachantiradze

Of course, pretty much everything that Kvachi does tends to be self-serving – though adjusted for the prevailing circumstances – and so even his most heroic exploits, such as when he winds up in actual battle, just happen to put his talents in the service of both his own survival and the greater good. Kvachi understands:

But you've go to keep an eye open to join the winning side, spit on the loser, and congratulate the winner all in good time.

— Mikheil Javakhishvili, Kvachi Kvachantiradze

In revolutionary Russia it can be hard to tell which side has the upper hand – "Russia has gone made", Kvachi notes – and he even shows a bit of patriotic fire. Briefly independent after 1917, Georgia couldn't stay out of Soviet clutches long, the British helping them hold out briefly but then leaving, leading to the inevitable:

Up till now we had two paths: either Russia or Europe. Now we're left with one: the Moscow path, which is Red and thorny.

— Mikheil Javakhishvili, Kvachi Kvachantiradze

=== After revolution ===
Of course, Kvachi can adjust to almost any conditions, and the New Economic Plan of the 1920s affords him quite a few opportunities: "NEP has revived the old convenient and profitable ways". Which at least works out for a while .....Kvachi isn't an entirely harmless rogue: he has blood on his hands – willing to resort to murder to escape prison (and, admittedly, an imminent hanging-sentence), for example – and his treatment of the women in his life is rather shocking, right down to the final arrangements he makes when most of his plans have gone bust. His conscience doesn't seem to trouble him, and Javakhishvili seems sympathetic to the nearly-everything-goes (lack of) ethics, which makes it a bit hard to sympathize with the character. The gullibility of nearly everyone Kvachi encounters does offer a bit of justification: whether pompous wealthy folk or women with unrealistic romantic ideals, everyone seems to almost want to get taken by Kvachi and his outlandish claims and promises. The rush of adventure, in very tumultuous times, and the range make for an entertaining read. Beyond that, in post-tsarist Russia, the novel also takes on a sharper and more political edge. Kvachi may be an opportunist, but as Javakhishvili repeatedly shows, idealism was in limited supply, and none of the sides particularly pure. (Indeed, Javakhishvili did not take his own advice in his portrayal of the victorious Bolsheviks – an attitude that would come to more than haunt him, leading to his death in Stalin's purges just over a decade later.)A nicely sweeping novel of Georgia and Russia (and, to some extent, Europe) in the first decades of the twentieth century, Kvachi has a bit of a rough feel to it: much of it originally published as separate stories, it has been fused together into a complete novel, but doesn't quite flow like it might have had it been a novel-project from the beginning.

== Main translations ==
- Novel was translated into German in 1986 – Das fürstliche Leben des Kwatschi
- Novel was translated into Arabic in 1994 – مغامرات كفاتشي / "Maghamarat Kwantshi"
- Novel was translated into Russian in 1999 – «Каналья»
- Novel was translated into English in 2014 – Kvachi
- Novel was translated into Turkish in 2017 – Madrabaz Kvaçi
- Novel was translated into French in 2022 – Les aventures de Kvatchi Kvatchantiradzé
