= The Glembays =

1988 film by Antun Vrdoljak

- Croatian: Glembajevi
- Directed by: Antun Vrdoljak
- Written by: Antun Vrdoljak
- Based on: Messrs. Glembay by Miroslav Krleža
- Starring: Mustafa Nadarević; Ena Begović; Tonko Lonza; Bernarda Oman; Žarko Potočnjak
- Cinematography: Vjekoslav Vrdoljak
- Edited by: Damir German
- Music by: Arsen Dedić
- Production companies: Jadran Film; Televizija Zagreb
- Release date: 1988
- Running time: 120 minutes
- Country: SFR Yugoslavia
- Language: Croatian

The Glembays (Croatian: Glembajevi) is a 1988 Croatian film directed by Antun Vrdoljak starring Mustafa Nadarević and Ena Begović. The film is an adaptation of Miroslav Krleža's 1929 play Messrs. Glembay (Gospoda Glembajevi) and was produced by Televizija Zagreb and Jadran Film.

== Plot ==
It is a period piece set in 1913 in Zagreb (which was at the time part of Austria-Hungary) and follows members of the fictional Glembay family, headed by Ignjat Glembay (Tonko Lonza), a prominent banker, and his second wife baroness Castelli (Ena Begović). Eleven years after his mother's suicide, Leone Glembay (Mustafa Nadarević) returns from abroad to his family home in Zagreb. He is haunted by depressing memories, particularly by thoughts of his deceased mother, his sister who committed suicide, and the Baroness Castelli, his father's second wife. The only member of his family that Leone confides in is Beatrice (Bernarda Oman), his brother Ivan's widow, who in the meantime became a nun and renamed herself Angelika. Leone witnesses omnipresent hypocrisy in the family and is repulsed by the criminal means through which his family became rich. Ultimately, Leone confronts his father and the baroness.

== Cast ==
- Mustafa Nadarević as Leone Glembay
- Ena Begović as Barunica Castelli
- Tonko Lonza as Ignjat Glembay
- Bernarda Oman as Beatrice, Sister Angelika
- Matko Raguž as Silberbrant
- Žarko Potočnjak as Puba Fabriczy
- Zvonimir Zoričić as Franz
- Zvonko Štrmac as Titus Androcius Fabriczy
- Zvonimir Rogoz as Older Gentleman
- Ksenija Pajić as beggaress Fanika Canjeg

== Reception ==
In 1999, a poll of Croatian film fans found it to be one of the best Croatian films ever made.

== Awards ==
The film won three Golden Arena awards at the 1988 Pula Film Festival, including Best Actor (Mustafa Nadarević), Best Supporting Actress (Ena Begović) and Costimography (Ika Škomrlj). However, Ena Begović refused to accept her award on the grounds that her part was in fact a leading role.

== Trivia ==
The actor Zvonimir Rogoz, the doyen of Croatian cinematography, was 100 when he made this movie.
