= A Woman's Burden =

1936 novel by Mikheil Javakhishvili

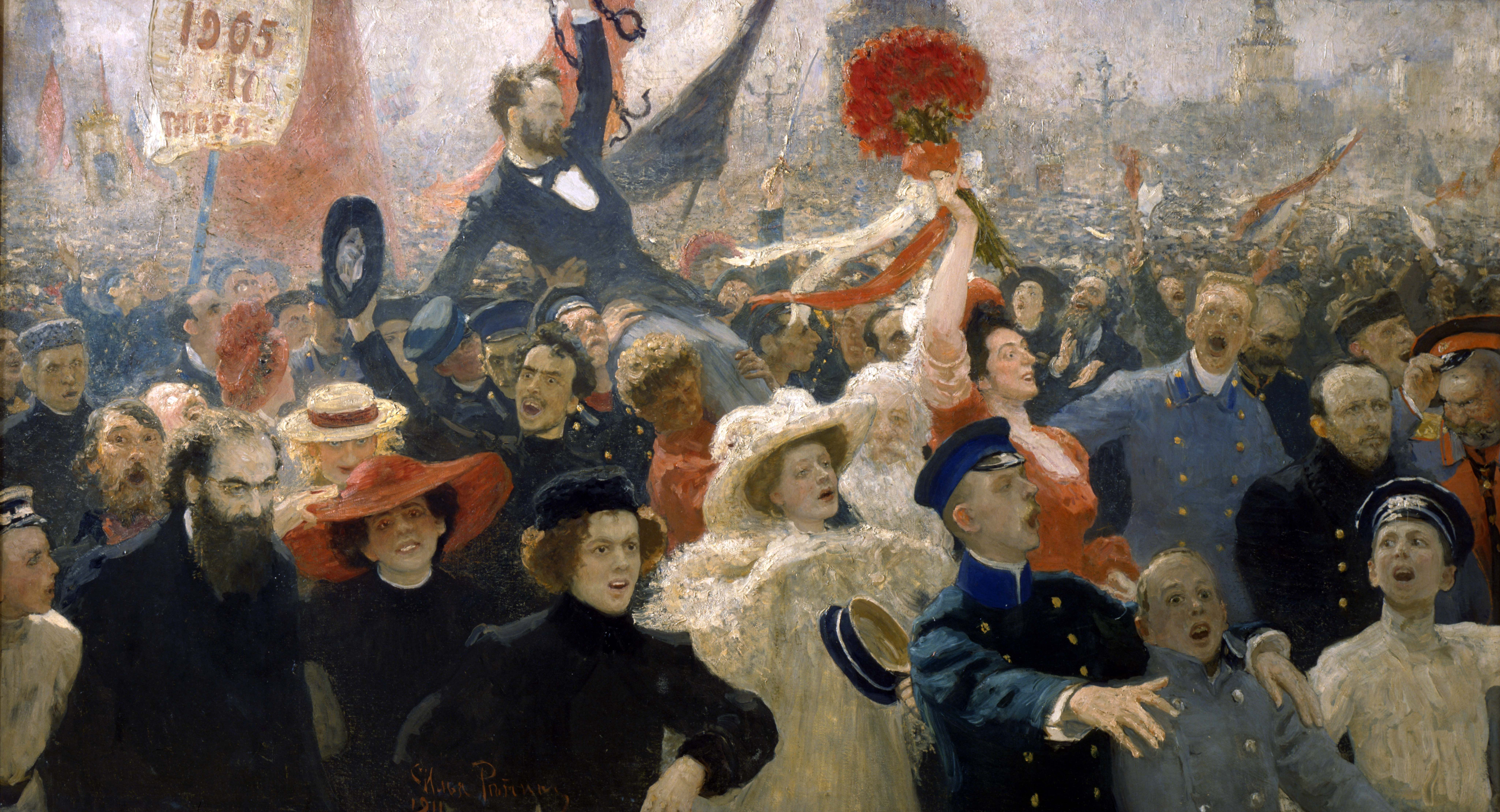
- Author: Mikheil Javakhishvili
- Original title: ქალის ტვირთი
- Language: Georgian
- Subject: Revolution of 1905
- Genre: Social novel Historical novel
- Set in: Georgia; Russia
- Published: 1936
- Publication place: Georgia
- Media type: Print (hardback)
- Pages: 400 pages

A Woman's Burden (Georgian: ქალის ტვირთი, romanized: kalis t'virti or Qalis tvirti) is the last novel by Georgian novelist Mikheil Javakhishvili. It was first published in 1936. Mikheil Javakhishvili was tortured and killed after publishing of this novel.

== About the novel ==
This is a story of a revolutionary but bourgeoisie woman, Ketevan, whose lover, a Bolshevik underground worker Zurab, persuades her to marry a Tsarist gendarme officer, Avsharov, whom she is to kill. The novel remained censored until the late 1950s when he was rehabilitated and republished. The novel tells the story of a young Kate Akhatneli, the tragic fate of the nobility class background, ideologically in favor of the proletariat, however, in the end, there's no place to turn. Novel characters and historical figures are bred mentioned: Ilia Chavchavadze, Akaki Tsereteli, Anton Purtseladze, Niko Nikoladze, Young Stalin.

== Plot ==
The main character is a young woman: Ms. Akhatneli. He escaped from the shelter in prison revolutionaries, Zurab Gurgenidze, who conveniently fled from prison. After the Revolution, the crowd becomes. In Akhatneli family lives people of different political views. For Illegal activity Kate's brother will be in prison. Kate married Avsharov (who is a General of the Gendarmerie, to help his brother, but actually he likes to Zurab Gurgenidze. Avsharov will understand about this and arrests him. Finally Gurgenidze will be exiled to Siberia and Kate (who is pregnant by Gurgenidze) will jump to Mkvari river.

== Characters ==
- Kate Akhatneli — Main person of novel.
- Zurab Gurgenidze — Revolutioner. Kate loves him.
- Sandro Klimiashvili — Gendarm.
- Akaki Akhatneli — One of Kate's brothers.
- Ilia Akhatneli — One of Kate's brothers.
- Niko Akhatneli — One of Kate's brothers.
- Martha — Wife of Zurab Gurgenidze.

=== Historical characters ===
- Ilia Chavchavadze — Georgian politician, lawyer, journalist, writer and poet.
- Akaki Tsereteli — prominent Georgian poet and national liberation movement figure.
- Anton Purtseladze — Georgian writer.
- Niko Nikoladze — Georgian writer, pro-Western enlightener.
- Young Stalin — The leader of the Soviet Union from the mid-1920s until his death in 1953

== Film adaptation ==
In 1957, the novel was adapted into a feature film, directed by Nikoloz Samanishvili and starring Lia Eliava as Kate and Yakov Tripolsky as Zurab.
