= Sam Locke (screenwriter) =

American dramatist

- Born: February 17, 1917; Peabody, Massachusetts, U.S.
- Died: September 18, 1998 (aged 81); San Diego, California, U.S.
- Education: City College of New York
- Occupations: TV/film screenwriter and director

Sam David Locke (January 17, 1917 – September 18, 1998) was an American writer and director who worked in theatre, television, and film.

== Biography ==
Born in Peabody, Massachusetts, Locke was the son of cantor Maurice Locke (born Lyokomovitch, 1887–1963) and Jennie Locke (1893–1988). He grew up in New York City and was educated at City College of New York. In his early career, he mainly worked as a writer for radio and the theatre. He wrote scripts for the classic radio programs Grand Central Station and Inner Sanctum Mystery. Locke wrote the musical books for six Broadway musicals: The Straw Hat Revue (1939), Tis of Thee (1940), Of V We Sing (1942), Let Freedom Sing (1942), Tidbits of 1946 (1946, which he also directed) and The Vamp (1955). He had only one play that reached Broadway, Fair Game (1957), starring Sam Levene which garnered mixed reviews and had a seven-month run at the Longacre Theatre that writer Larry Gelbart attributed its Broadway run mostly to the performance and drawing power of Sam Levene, the veteran Broadway star who is best known for creating some of the most legendary comedic roles in American theatrical history, including Nathan Detroit, the craps-shooter extraordinaire, in the 1950 original Broadway production of Guys and Dolls; Patsy in the 1935 original Broadway production of Three Men on a Horse; Gordon Miller, the shoestring producer, in the original Broadway production of Room Service (1937 and Al Lewis, the retired vaudevillian, in the original Broadway production of The Sunshine Boys (1972). Somewhat more successful was Women With Red Hair, a play performed sporadically, although never on Broadway.

In 1951 Locke made his first foray into television with an adaptation of Preston Sturges' The Guinea Pig for the program Studio One in Hollywood. He did not work in television again until 1958 when he authored an episode of Alfred Hitchcock's Suspicion. From there on out, his career was chiefly centered on work as a screenwriter for television. He wrote episodes for such TV series as Bachelor Father (1960), Peter Loves Mary (1961), Bob Hope Presents the Chrysler Theatre (1964), The Donna Reed Show (1964–1965), The Patty Duke Show (1965–1966), McHale's Navy (1964–1966), Gilligan's Island (1964–1967), Tammy (1965–1966), The Lucy Show (1966), Green Acres (1967), The Ghost & Mrs. Muir (1969), The Flying Nun (1969–1970), The Brady Bunch (1970–1974), All in the Family (1972–1973), Devlin (1974), and Chico and the Man (1978) among others. His last contribution as a television screenwriter was for a 1989 episode of DuckTales.

Locke also wrote the screenplays to a few films, including two 1965 surfer flicks: The Girls on the Beach and Beach Ball. His other film credits include the screenplays for Wild Wild Winter (1966) and Schloß in den Wolken (1968).

Locke also wrote documentary films distributed by the United States Information Agency during the Cold War, such as Men of the Forest in 1952 in order to portray the United States in a positive light amidst Soviet Union propaganda and opposition against the United States.
