= Givi Shaduri =

1928 novel by Mikheil Javakhishvili

- Author: Mikheil Javakhishvili
- Original title: გივი შადური
- Language: Georgian
- Genre: Epistolary novel Adventure fiction
- Publication date: 1928
- Publication place: Georgia
- Media type: Print (hardback)
- Pages: 200 pages

Givi Shaduri (Georgian: გივი შადური; Givi Shaduri) is the fourth novel by Georgian novelist Mikheil Javakhishvili. It was first published in 1928. During his life, it was published several times. It is reputed to one of the best adventure novel in Georgia. Mikheil Javakhishvili wrote the novel Givi Shaduri in 1928. The novel follows the adventure genre. It is made up of five independent stories, which have one common character - the story teller, the title named Givi Shaduri.

== Plot ==
Givi Shaduri tells the story of a man broken and oppressed by life, depicted with profound emotional depth and psychological insight. The narrator of the novel, Givi Shaduri, speaks to the reader from a festive gathering. He is an elderly man experienced in the ways of life. Each story recounts episodes filled with the hardships and adventures that have shaped his existence.
