= Man of the Forest (story) =

1923 short story by Mikheil Javakhishvili

- Author: Mikheil Javakhishvili
- Original title: ტყის კაცი
- Language: Georgian
- Genre: Philosophical fiction Tragedy
- Publication date: 1923
- Publication place: Georgia
- Media type: Print (hardback)
- Pages: 50 pages

Man of the Forest (Georgian: ტყის კაცი; Tkis kaci) is a Mikheil Javakhishvili story. First published in 1923. This short story is the writer's first work of "The second period of the creativity". One day Paolo Iashvili told an amazing story, which later laid the basis for this story.

== Characters ==
- "Pavle" - the main character. Forest man. Mikheil Javakhishvili's father was a prototype of the Pavle.
- "Nika" - Pavle Child.
- "Gogia" - Pavle Child.
- "Mate Narikashvili" - the church watchman.
- "Naskhida" - Pavle village.
- "Pelo" - Pavle's wife.
- "Priest" - he cures Nick.
