= The Ballads of Petrica Kerempuh =

1935–1936 poetry book by Miroslav Krleža

- Cover of the first edition
- Author: Miroslav Krleža
- Original title: Balade Petrice Kerempuha
- Language: Kajkavian
- Genre: poetry, philosophy
- Publisher: S. Škerl
- Publication date: 1936
- Publication place: Croatia
- Media type: Hardcover, paperback

The Ballads of Petrica Kerempuh (Croatian: Balade Petrice Kerempuha) is a philosophically poetic work by the Croatian writer Miroslav Krleža, comprising thirty poems published between December 1935 and March 1936.

== Overview ==
The work spans a period of five centuries, focusing around the commoner prophet Petrica Kerempuh, who is a type of Croatian Till Eulenspiegel. It is written in the northern Croatian Kajkavian dialect.

Krleža did not typically write in Kajkavian, but decided to put the dialect into focus for the ballads. Literary critics argue that he succeeded in showing that — even if in his time Kajkavian was not used in formal domains of life — it was still possible to create a work of great literal expression in it and that the Kajkavian dialect was not a less valuable literary language.

== Legacy ==
The poem is generally considered to be a masterpiece of Krleža's literary opus and of Croatian literature.

The Ballads have been translated (mostly only in part) into Slovene, Italian, Macedonian, Hungarian, Czech, French, Russian, and Arabic. A full German translation was published in 2016.
