= The White Collar (novel) =

1926 novel by Mikheil Javakhishvili

- Author: Mikheil Javakhishvili
- Original title: თეთრი საყელო
- Language: Georgian
- Genre: Social novel Philosophical fiction
- Publication date: 1926
- Publication place: Georgia
- Media type: Print (hardback)
- Pages: 200 pages
- ISBN: 978-3-8440-3135-5

The White Collar (Georgian: თეთრი საყელო; Tetri sakelo) is a novel by Georgian novelist Mikheil Javakhishvili. It was first published in magazine Mnatobi (in 1926). During his life, it was published several times. This novel, which depicts social problems in the early 20th century of Khevsureti, in the north part of Georgia, is reputed to be a magnum opus of the author.

== Plot ==
In the novel, the author set out to explore complex philosophical issues through artistic expression. The narrator, Elizbar, is an ordinary citizen who travels to the mountains in search of copper and unexpectedly finds himself in a village isolated from civilization. Through his perspective, the novel portrays the conflict between urban civilization and the traditional customs of mountain life.
