= On the Edge of Reason =

1938 novel by Miroslav Krleža

- Author: Miroslav Krleža
- Original title: Na rubu pameti
- Language: Croatian
- Publication date: 1938
- Publication place: Croatia
- Pages: 313
- OCLC: 38603726

On the Edge of Reason (Croatian: Na rubu pameti) is a 1938 novel by Miroslav Krleža. It is the only novel Krleža narrated in first person. The work was written under the influence of Isušena kaljuža ('A Dried Mire'), written around 1906–1910 by Janko Polić Kamov.

== Synopsis ==
Taking the form of a first-person, unnamed narrator, the work takes place in Zagreb and follows the downfall of a lawyer who previously lived a monotonous life. After attending a party, surrounded by high class, he sharply criticizes the Director-General Domaćinski, after the latter tells an anecdote how he shot four people for trespassing on his property. He is stigmatized by others around him, eventually being brought to court for slander and ending up in prison.

== English translation ==
It was published in English first by Vanguard Press in 1976, followed by three further printings by New Directions Publishing. The English text, translated by Zora Depolo, "omit[ted] a large part of the novel", including the chapter entitled "Moonlight Can be a World View as Well", according to Crnković. According to Ellen Elias-Bursać, Depolo's translation was "effectively re-wr[itten]" by Vanguard editor Branko Lenski, who removed two whole chapters and "greatly reduced" another in an effort to make the novel more streamlined and suited for the American market. Vanguard's president Evelyn Shrifte sought Krleža's authorization for the reduced edition. Krleža signed an authorization in 1974, characterizing the edits as "a number of free translations and a few deletions where meaningful translation from Croatian into English proved virtually impossible or where local historical content would prove too great an impediment for the American reader and critic to cope with."

Elias-Bursać writes that, given that the extent of the edits were much greater than as characterized in the authorization, "Miroslav Krleža’s English may well have been inadequate to allow him to grasp their extent, or perhaps he wasn’t shown the English translation at all." She characterizes Lenski's editing as informed by a sense of condescension toward Krleža and "entitlement" to rewrite the novel—in one note to Vanguard's copyeditor, Lenski wrote: "[…] if a single reference to that […] absolutely idiotic tiny sparrow at Brzezinka railway station has been inadvertently not crossed out, cross it out please". Elias-Bursać writes that the available Lenski-Depolo English text fails to convey the novel's power, but that the Slavist Stephen M. Dickey has translated the missing chapters for his students, and as of 2019 received interest from New Directions.

== Reception ==
Following its initial publication in Zagreb, the work was condemned by a number of critics (mainly on the left) for supposedly equating communism (in its Stalinist form) with fascist methods and for not presenting a genuine worldview. It was, however, praised by more nationally oriented critics. Gordana P. Crnković dedicated a chapter to the novel as a "foundation" of post-Yugoslav literature and film in her book on the subject. She analyzes the book as centered on a "terrible rupture" between the truth as a logical abstract and the truth as a communal agreement—in the novel, that rupture is between the apparent truth of the narrator's condemnation of Domaćinski, and the apparent intolerability of his remarks in the society of Zagreb.

Susan Sontag called it "one of the great European novels of the first half of the 20th century" on the back of the 1995 English edition. A review for Publishers Weekly described Krleža as a "shrewd observer of man as social animal, and his wry, sardonic style fits cleanly into the Eastern European tradition of bureaucratic satire by the likes of Kafka, Karel Capek and Jaroslav Hasek". Saturday Review in its review of the book called Krleža "One of the most accomplished, profound authors in European literature". In a review for Boston Phoenix, Paul West notes that "the marvel about this novel is that, for all its restrictedness and Balkan didacticism, it remains in the mind as blatant as a tattooed orange, ever perched close to wit, and empirically crisp". In a 2023 review in the New York Review of Books, Joshua Cohen places On the Edge of Reason among a group of works he calls "Imp Fiction" or "Impfic", after Edgar Allan Poe's "The Imp of the Perverse": "fiction whose plot is set in motion by an outburst—usually a remark attributed to one of its characters or delivered by its narrator within quotations." He also names Saul Bellow's "Him with His Foot in His Mouth", Philip Roth's The Human Stain, and Milan Kundera's The Joke as great representative works. On the Edge of Reason, writes Cohen, is "among the contenders for the earliest and most purely entertaining work of modern Impfic," a "brief, harrowing, charmingly witty book, a masterly novel".
