= The Croatian God Mars =

1922 short stories by Miroslav Krleža

- First edition cover page
- Author: Miroslav Krleža
- Original title: Hrvatski bog Mars
- Language: Croatian
- Genre: collection of short stories
- Publication date: 1922, 1933, 1947
- Publication place: Yugoslavia

The Croatian God Mars (Croatian: Hrvatski bog Mars) is a collection of short stories, mostly antiwar and social topics by Miroslav Krleža, and considered by many the greatest Croatian writer of the 20th century. A short story collection that depicted the exploitation of peasants and the miserable condition of the Croatian soldier, Hrvatski bog Mars proved to be his most notable short story collection.

It was first released in 1922, then again in 1933, and in its final form in 1947.

== Stories ==
- Bitka kod Bistrice Lesne (Battle of Bistrica Lesina)
- Királyi Magyar Honvéd novella
- Tri domobrana (Three Homeguards)
- Baraka pet Be (Barrack Five B)
- Domobran Jambrek (Homeguard Jambrek)
- Smrt Franje Kadavera (Death of Franjo Kadaver)
- Hrvatska rapsodija (Croatian Rhapsody)

English translations of the first, fourth, and fifth story are available in Harbors Rich in Ships: Selected Revolutionary Writings. Translated by Željko Cipriš. New York: Monthly Review Press, 2017.
