= The Return of Philip Latinowicz =

1932 novel by Miroslav Krleža

- Author: Miroslav Krleža
- Original title: Povratak Filipa Latinovicza
- Language: Croatian
- Genre: Philosophical novel
- Publisher: MK SDM
- Publication date: 1932
- Publication place: Yugoslavia
- English publication date: 1959
- Media type: Print (hardback and paperback)
- Pages: 232 pp. (Zora Depolo translation)

The Return of Philip Latinowicz (Croatian: Povratak Filipa Latinovicza, pronounced [pǒvratak fǐlipa latǐːnoʋitɕa]) is a novel by the Croatian author Miroslav Krleža. It is considered the first modern complete novel of Croatian literature. The structure is very complex, although it lacks a classical composition and storyline.

== Characters ==
- Philip Latinowicz: the main character of the novel; a painter who returns to Kaptol, a Croatian town alongside the Danube River, and the location of Philip's childhood. In Kaptol, Philip lives with his mother and attempts to resolve their broken relationship, all while having an affair with the promiscuous Xenia Raday, or Bobočka, and arguing about the merits of painting.
- Xenia Raday (Bobočka, or Boba): A woman of noble birth who uses sex to get what she wants from men. When Philip meets her, she has already ended two marriages and is living with Vladimir Baločanski, who does whatever she asks. Her relationship with Philip is far from exclusive; she seems to attract men from all around her, including Kyriales.
- Vladimir Baločanski: A former lawyer, Baločanski's affair with Bobočka ruins much more than his marriage. His financial ruin, stemming from his reckless spending to please his mistress, lands him in court and then prison. His wife, understanding that he has chosen his mistress over her and finding herself in financial ruin as well, commits suicide. He now spends his time as Bobočka's servant of sorts, lost without her, but forced to sit by as she plays with the men around her.
- Regina: Philip's mother; during Philip's childhood, she kept a tobacconist's shop. Now, in the present world of the novel, Regina lives the quiet life of an aging woman, endlessly preoccupied with her appearance. She spends her time attending excursions and picnics with the elites of the town.
- Sergei Kirilovitch Kyriales: A doctor of philosophy and medicine, a former professor at the University of Istanbul, and one of Bobočka's many lovers, Kyriales succeeds in inciting the jealous attentions of Philip. Supposedly, his sweetheart had been shot 20 years earlier by the Cossacks at St. Petersburg. It is Kyriales who challenges Philip's usefulness as a painter and forces Philip to reflect particularly on the meaning of his painting and more generally on the purpose of artistic endeavors.
- Dr. Silvius Liepach of Kostanjevec: The former District High Commissioner, "His Excellency," is Regina's lover, whom Philip is shocked to meet upon his return. At the end of the novel, Regina reveals that Liepach is actually Philip's father.

== Plot ==
Twenty-three years before this novel begins, Philip Latinowicz, still a schoolboy living in Kaptol, runs away from home with a hundred florin note stolen from his mother, which he spends on women and booze for three days and three nights. When he returns to his mother's house, she treats him as a stranger and sends him away. Upon his return to Kaptol in the present day, Philip struggles to reconcile his relationship with his mother, whose obsession with perfumes and elite society now threatens to drive him crazy. The two fail to find common ground; when Philip attempts to paint his mother, she is disgusted by his less-than-positive view of her and condemns the project. Even more, he hates her new lover, Dr. Liepach of Kostanjevec, whom he finds pretentious and conceited, despite his obvious charms and kind gestures.

However, it is at one of his mother's elite gatherings that Philip meets Bobočka, to whom he is immediately drawn. They attend the town's St. Roch's Day festival together. The depraved drunkenness and wild nature of the crowd inspire Philip to imagine a painting, depicting the townspeople sinning in the name of their god. On the way home, through the forest, a thunderstorm strikes, and Philip finds himself sharing his imagined painting with Bobočka, and in the process, sharing an intimate moment with her. Bobočka introduces Philip to an entirely different side of Kaptol, made up of Baločanski, her former and current lovers, and a vibrant nightlife.

But Philip is soon enraged by the presence of Bobočka's new lover, Kyriales, especially when Kyriales questions the utility of art and Philip's talent. Kyriales' erudite critiques baffle Philip, who finds himself almost wanting to believe that painting has become a degenerate practice. Unable to articulate a retort as elegantly as he would have hoped, Philip is forced to reflect inwardly after the conversation, asking himself why he paints and what he gets from his artistic endeavors. He concludes that "art was talent" and that "talent was a force which was inexplicable in terms of anything physical," something "clairvoyant" and supernatural and incomprehensible to someone like Kyriales.

Sometime later, Kyriales jumps in front of a train and is killed. Bobočka is called to identify his mangled body. It is this event that drives Bobočka's decision to leave Kaptol for Hamburg as soon as possible. She arrives at Philip's door that night, asking for the money necessary to get to Hamburg. They arrive at a plan, Philip agreeing to get as much money as he can, and she is insistent on collecting it at seven that same night. The town surveyor can give Philip five thousand, and Philip already has two thousand, making seven thousand for Bobočka.

At 6:22, while waiting for Bobočka, Baločanski arrives at Philip's door. He laments to Philip that Bobočka is leaving to get away from him, and plans on abandoning him when he has sacrificed everything and dishonored himself all for her. He asks that Philip convince her to stay. At that moment, Bobočka arrives. Baločanski demands that she leave with him, and she refuses. Finally, she agrees to leave with Baločanski after telling Philip that she will come back before supper.

Philip is now left alone, angry, and tired. His mother chose this time to come to his room and ask what Mr. Baločanski had wanted. Philip demands that she leave him alone, but she becomes upset. She warns him about spending too much time with Bobočka, who has a history of ruining men; Baločanski and Kyriales are examples of that. When Philip insults her for attempting to give him a lecture on morality, she accuses him of not believing in God. Philip then denounces her as a woman who does not even know the father of her own child, a question that tormented him his entire life. She finally confesses to him that his father is none other than Dr. Liepach and storms out of the room.

A knock at the door follows her exit, and Philip finds Baločanski visiting him yet again. He tells Philip not to expect Bobočka that evening, for she is unable to come. Baločanski insists that Bobočka had changed her mind and would stay with him in Kaptol. Philip does not believe Baločanski, who gives him a note which he claims Bobočka wrote to him to explain her decision. But the note is nothing but a receipt for perfume with drops of blood on it. Philip runs to Bobočka's house, only to find her lying on her bed in her own blood, her throat bitten through. Her eyes remained open.

== Themes ==
1. Compares and contrasts the past and the present
2. Emphasizes the corrupting influences of bourgeois life
3. Conveys existentialist thoughts in Philip's doubts about art and the meaning of his existence
4. Questions the role of art
5. The role of identity in existentialist theory

== Publication history ==
The Return of Philip Latinowicz was originally published in Croatian in 1932 as Povratak Filipa Latinovicza.

The novel has been translated into English, French, German, Dutch, Slovene, Swedish, Slovak, Macedonian, Czech, Hungarian, Lithuanian, Italian, and Spanish.

The novel was translated by Zora Depolo and published for English audiences in 1959.

== Awards ==
In a 2010 poll of 40 Croatian intellectuals for the greatest Croatian novels of all time, compiled by Jutarnji list daily, The Return of Philip Latinowicz came in 3rd, after Ranko Marinković's Kiklop (Cyclops) and Slobodan Novak's Mirisi, zlato i tamjan (Gold, Frankincense and Myrrh).
