= Isaac Markens =

American writer

- Born: October 9, 1846; New York, New York
- Died: August 1928

Isaac Markens (October 9, 1846 – August 1928) was a Jewish American writer.

Markens was born in New York City, the son of Elias Markens, a linguist and Orientalist. Isaac Markens was educated in the public schools of his native city. He became a merchant, and afterward private secretary to Railway Commissioner Albert Fink.

Subsequently he entered the journalistic field, and wrote for the New York Commercial Advertiser and the Mail and Express. In 1888 he published The Hebrews in America, a series of historical and biographical sketches of value as being the first of their kind on American Jewish history.

Markens was for several years secretary to the board of arbitration of the Joint Executive Committee of Eastern and Western Railways. He died, aged 82, in 1928.
