= The Banquet in Blitva =

Political novel by Miroslav Krleža

- Author: Miroslav Krleža
- Original title: Banket u Blitvi
- Translator: Edward Dennis Goy & Jasna Levinger-Goy
- Language: Croatian
- Genre: political satire
- Publication date: See below
- Publication place: Kingdom of Yugoslavia (first and second books); SFR Yugoslavia (third book)
- English publication date: 2004
- Pages: 337
- ISBN: 9780810118621 English version only

The Banquet in Blitva: A Novel in Three Books (Croatian: Banket u Blitvi: roman u tri knjige) is a political novel by Miroslav Krleža. The story takes place in the fictitious northeastern European nation of Blitva, which, after centuries of foreign rule and political instability, has become a newly independent state under a dictatorship headed by Colonel Kristian Barutanski. The novel is generally regarded as a satire of interwar Yugoslavia.

== Structure ==
The novel is split up into three books, narrated by an observer "from a distant and foggy foreign country". The first two parts of the novel deal with the political situation in Blitva and two figures present in the country: Colonel Barutanski, its dictator, and Niels Nielsen, an intellectual and dissident. The third part reflect on Nielsen's life as a dissident, including his personal doubts and past actions. The first two parts were published in 1938 and 1939, respectively, but, due to political pressure, Krleža did not publish the last part until the 1960s. (Note: Different dates are given for the publication of the final part. The Encyclopedia Britannica cites 1961; the Miroslav Krleža Institute of Lexicography states 1962, with a later 1964 version carrying significant edits by Krleža made between December 1962 and January 1963, and considers 1964 to be the date of completion; and others have cited 1963, probably due to that year having the final edits.) Only the first two parts of have been translated into English.

"Blitva" is a play on the words "blitva" (Croatian for 'Swiss chard') and "Litva" (Croatian for 'Lithuania').

== Themes ==
The book has been described as a satire of "eastern European backwardness and western European decadence" and a critique of rising fascist sympathies in interwar Yugoslavia. Other writers, such as Miroslav Vaupotić, have compared the events in the novel to Józef Piłsudski's Poland.
