= Man of the Forest (novel) =

Western novel by Zane Grey, 1912

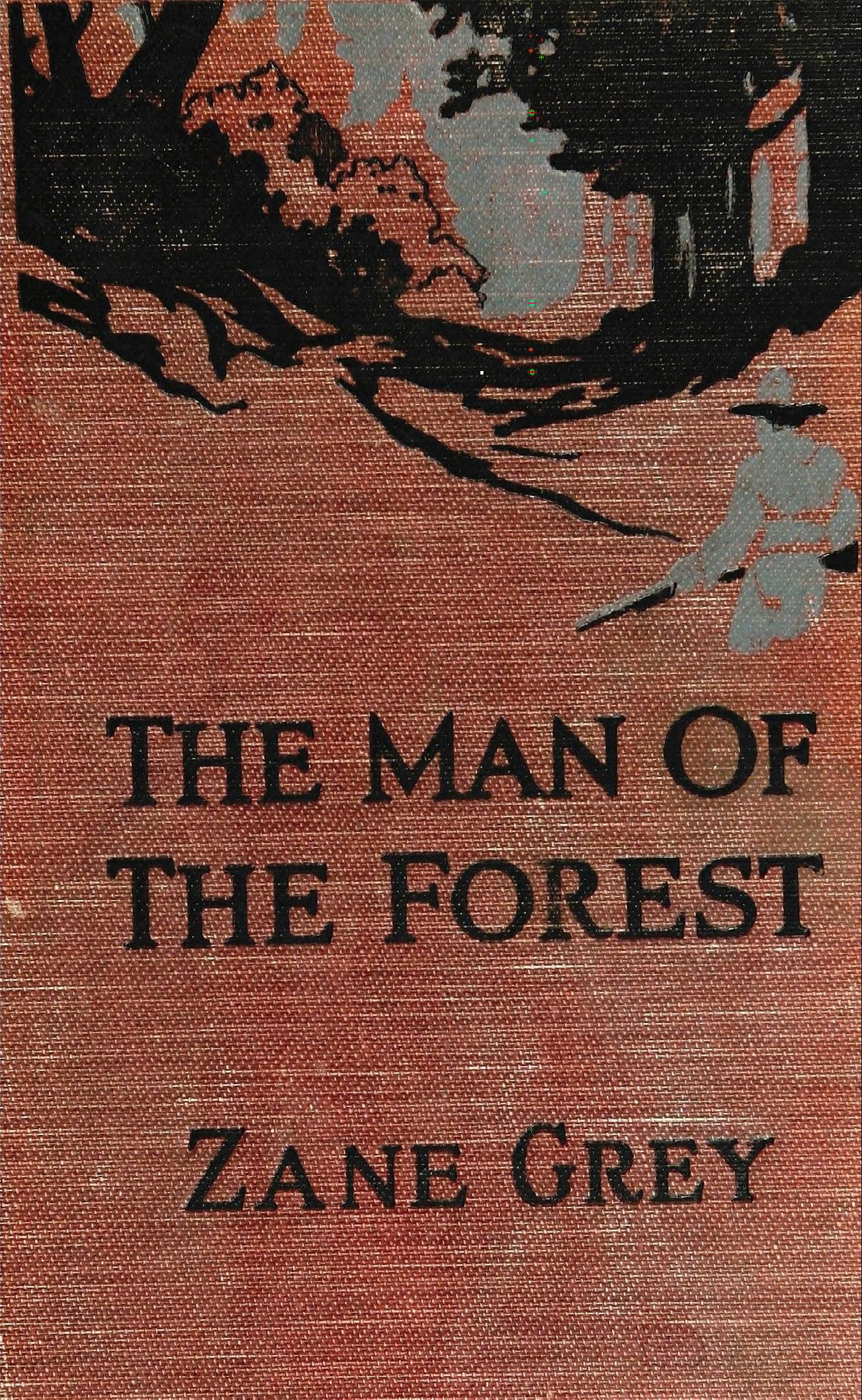
- Author: Zane Grey
- Language: English
- Genre: Western
- Publisher: Harper & Brothers, Grosset & Dunlap
- Publication date: 1920
- Publication place: United States
- Pages: 383
- LC Class: PS3513 .R6545 M36

Man of the Forest was a 1920 novel by Zane Grey.

== Adaptations ==
The novel was adapted three times into film

- Man of the Forest (1921 film), an American film
- Man of the Forest (1926 film), an American Western silent film
- Man of the Forest (1933 film), an American pre-Code film
