= Jaqo's Dispossessed =

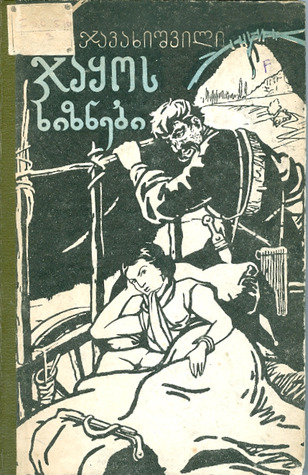
- Author: Mikheil Javakhishvili
- Original title: ჯაყოს ხიზნები
- Language: Georgian
- Genre: Social novel Philosophical fiction
- Publication date: 1924
- Publication place: Georgia
- Media type: Print (hardback)
- Pages: 300 pages

Jaqo's Dispossessed (Georgian: ჯაყოს ხიზნები; Jaqos khiznebi) is a novel by Georgian novelist Mikheil Javakhishvili. It was first published in magazine Mnatobi (in 1924 - № 7–8 and 1925 - № 1). During his life, it was published twice as a book, in 1925 and 1926. It took author 20 years to write this novel. This novel depicts social problems in the early 20th century of Georgia.

== Plot ==
A principled nobleman Teimuraz Khevistavi with his wife Margo live poorly in Tbilisi and are getting more impoverished due to the Soviet invasion in Georgia. Their farm laborer Jaqo takes advantage of the naivety and poverty of Teimuraz and seizes whole their belongings through deception.

== Characters ==
- Teimuraz Khevistavi — an intelligent nobleman who, through his naivety and inactivity, loses everything.
- Margo kaplanishvili — Teimuraz’s wife, later Jaqo’s wife.
- Jaqo Jivashvili — an Ossetian peasant who, through his cruelty and strength, takes everything from his master — including Margo.
- Ninika — a peasant who opposed Jaqo.
- Ivane — the village priest.
- Petre Devdarashvili – Teimuraz’s Mouravi.
- Brinka — Jaqo’s relative.
- Nina — Jaqo’s wife.
