= Men of the Forest =

Documentary about African-American logging family from the South

- Directed by: Lawrence Glesnes
- Written by: Sam Locke
- Produced by: Robert Gross
- Starring: Mamie Hunter; Louis Hunter; Harry Hunter; James Hunter
- Narrated by: John Griggs
- Cinematography: Langdon V. Senick
- Edited by: Robert C. Jacques; Lester Orlebeck
- Music by: Winston Sharples
- Production company: American Film Producers Inc.
- Distributed by: United States Information Service (USIS)
- Release date: 1952
- Country: United States
- Language: English

Men of the Forest is a 1952 documentary film about an African-American family of rural loggers in Georgia as they transition from hand tools to a more efficient power saw. The film was directed by Lawrence Glasnes, produced by the American Film Producers, Inc., and distributed by the United States Information Service.

Created during the Cold War, the film was primarily intended for a foreign audience to portray American capitalism and an African-American family's role within it in a positive light, amidst the rising tide of Soviet propaganda against the United States.

== Plot ==
An African-American family in Georgia works to save money for a power saw. The film explains and shows the job of lumberjacks working in the forest.

== Cast ==
- John Griggs - Narrator
- Harry Hunter - as self
- James Hunter - as self
- Louis Hunter - as self
- Mamie Hunter - as self
