= Messrs. Glembay =

1929 play by Miroslav Krleža

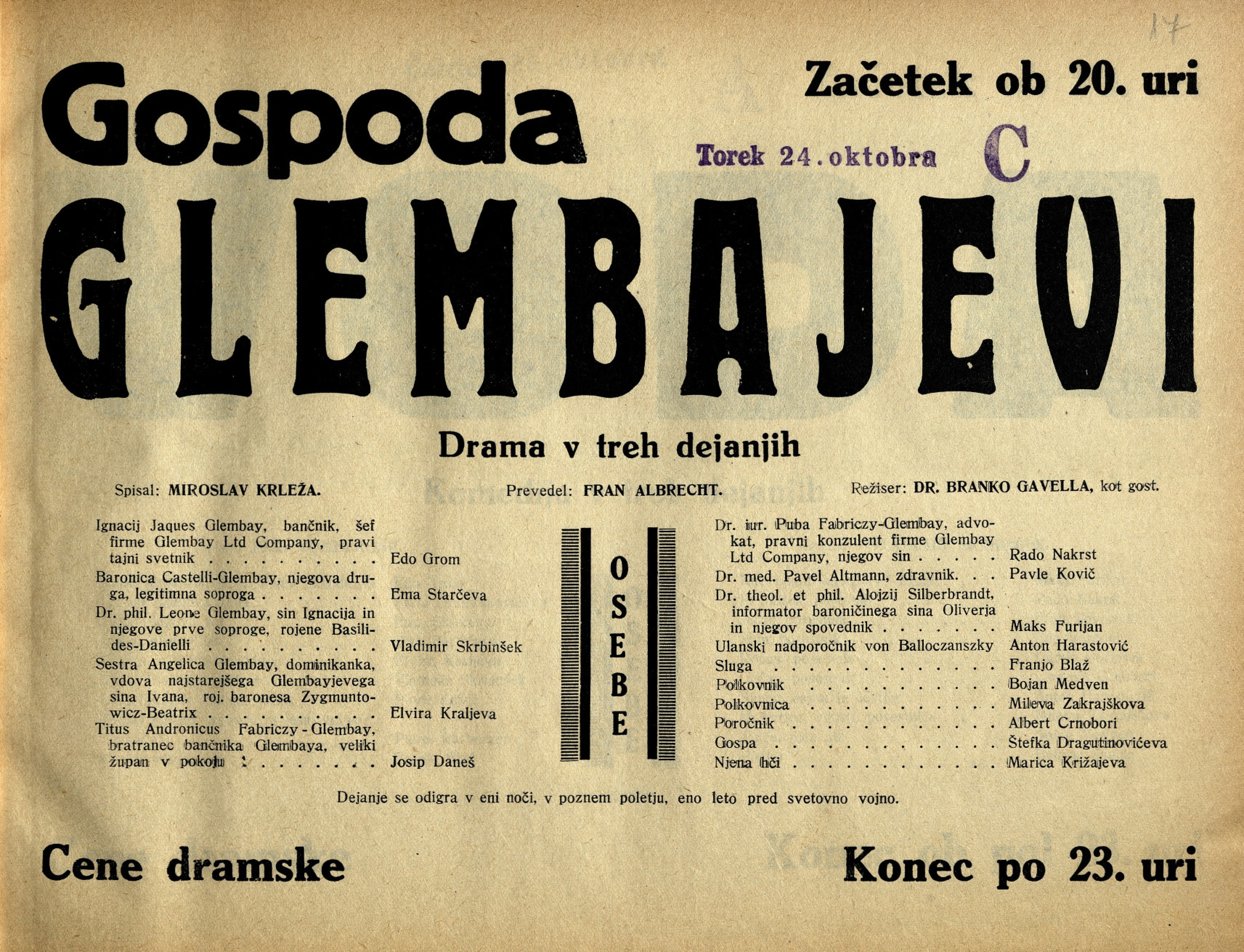
- A poster for the play at the Maribor Slovene National Theatre, Slovenia (24 October 1933)
- Author: Miroslav Krleža
- Original title: Gospoda Glembajevi. Drama u tri čina iz života jedne agramerske patricijske obitelji
- Language: Croatian
- Genre: Drama
- Publisher: DHK
- Publication date: 1929
- Publication place: Yugoslavia
- Media type: Print (hardback and paperback)

Messrs. Glembay: A Drama in Three Acts From the Life of One Agramer Patrician Family (Croatian: Gospoda Glembajevi. Drama u tri čina iz života jedne agramerske patricijske obitelji) (Note: The adjective Agramer (Croatian: agramerski) refers to Agram, an archaic name for Zagreb) is a play by the Croatian author Miroslav Krleža. The play is divided into three acts, dealing with the events and the rift within the Glembay family. Messrs. Glembay is the first of three plays in the Glembay cycle which includes the dramas In Agony and Leda. The drama is commonly performed in the standard repertoire of major theaters across Croatia, and it is considered a classic of Croatian literature.

The play was adapted into a 1988 feature film The Glembays by Antun Vrdoljak, starring Mustafa Nadarević as Leone Glembay and Ena Begović as Baroness Castelli-Glembay. An English translation of Gospoda Glembajevi (The Glembays) is available in Harbors Rich in Ships: Selected Revolutionary Writings by Željko Cipriš.

== Plot ==
The play is set in Zagreb, then a part of the Austro-Hungarian Empire, in the summer of 1913. The events of the play unfold in Ignjat Glembay's home on the night of a feast celebrating the anniversary of the Glembay Ltd., between the hours of one and five in the morning.

In the first act, Leone Glembay, an intellectual and artist, returns after eleven years to the house of his family, the powerful but morally rotten Glembays. During a festive evening in the red salon, he discusses philosophy and art with his dead brother's wife Angelika – a widow-turned-nun – for whom he feels special affection. The atmosphere becomes tense when a conversation starts about a newspaper article that accuses of the death of seamstress Fanika Canje and her child, after previously running over her mother-in-law. Leone, already appalled by the family's crimes and hypocrisy, openly accuses the baroness and refuses to participate in covering up the scandal.

The second act begins as Leone packs to leave the house, but his father Ignjat confronts him about his accusations. A heated argument ensues in which Leone exposes the family's history of corruption, fraud, and tragedy, including the suicide of her sister and mother, for which she blames the baroness. When his father slaps his face in anger, Leone admits that the baroness seduced him too. Ignjat suffers a heart attack and dies.

The third act takes place in Ignjat's bedroom, where the family and co-workers discuss the death. The baroness tries to justify her actions, while Leone, devastated and exhausted, tells Angelika that the only way out is suicide. The baroness loses her mind and attacks Angelika, accusing her of being the cardinal's mistress, and Leone kicks her out of the family home. When she refuses to leave, Leone grabs a pair of scissors and chases her into the hallway, after which a loud noise can be heard. The play ends with Leone murdering the baroness, while Angelika remains speechless and frozen in place "like a doll".

== Characters ==
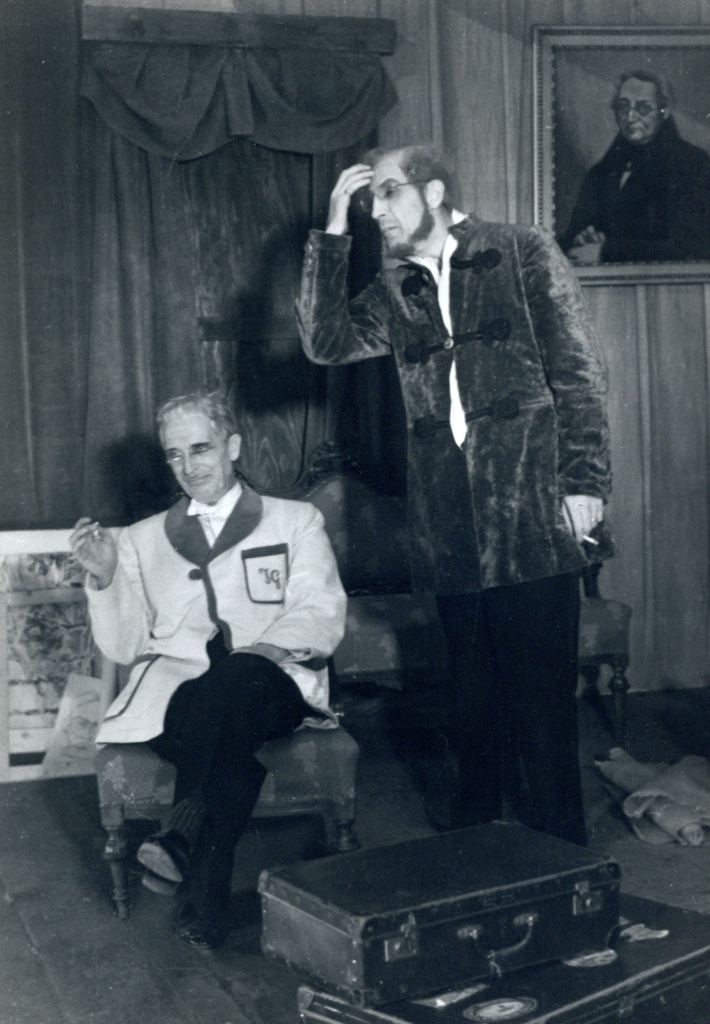
The play by the Ljubljana Drama Theatre in 1946

- Naci (Ignjat, Jacques) Glembay, a banker, owner of company Glembay Ltd., first secret adviser (69 years old)
- Baroness Charlotte Castelli–Glembay, Ignjat's second legitimate wife (45 years old)
- Dr. Phil. Leone Glembay, Ignjat's son from his first wife née Basilides–Danielli (38 years old)
- Sister Angelika Glembay, a nun of the Dominican Order, widow from Glembay's son Ivan, née Baroness Zygtmuntowicz Beatrix (29 years old)
- Titus Andronicus Fabriczy-Glembay, Glembay's cousin and a bishop emeritus (69 years old)
- Dr. Iuris Puba Fabriczy-Glembay, a lawyer and the law adviser of company Glembay Ltd.; he is also his son (28 years old)
- Paul Altmann, M.D., a physician (51 years old)
- Dr. Theol. et Phil. Alojzije Silberbrandt, adviser of baroness's son and her confessor (39 years old)
- Oliver Glembay, son of Baroness Castelli and banker Glembay (17 years old)
- Ulanski Oberleutanant Von Ballocsanszky, an army lieutenant (24 years old)
