= Arsena Odzelashvili =

Arsena Odzelashvili (Georgian: არსენა ოძელაშვილი) commonly known as Arsena of Marabda (არსენა მარაბდელი; Arsena Marabdeli) (c. 1797 – 1842) was a Georgian outlaw said to have robbed the rich to help the poor. He gained popularity as a fighter against serfdom and Russian colonial rule in Georgia.

Born in a village Marabda (hence his nickname) to a typical Georgian peasant family, he led from the 1820s a small band which moved from region to region organizing assaults on police forces and loyal landowners. Eventually he was killed in 1842 in a skirmish with a Cossack unit at Mtskheta.

His popularity has been reflected in several fictional settings, particularly in folk poetry and patriotic Georgian literature. A Soviet-era silent movie about him was shot in 1923.
