= Miroslav Krleža =

Croatian writer (1893–1981)

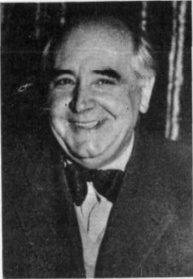
- Miroslav Krleža in 1953
- Born: 7 July 1893; Zagreb, Croatia-Slavonia, Austria-Hungary
- Died: 29 December 1981 (aged 88); Zagreb, SR Croatia, SFR Yugoslavia
- Occupations: Novelist, playwright, poet, philosopher, essayist, cultural critic
- Spouse: Leposava "Bela" Kangrga (m. 1919; died 1981)
- Writing career
- Language: Croatian
- Period: 1915–1977
- Notable works: Messrs. Glembay; The Croatian God Mars; The Ballads of Petrica Kerempuh; The Return of Philip Latinowicz; The Banquet in Blitva; The Banners
- Literary movement: Expressionism, Socialist realism

Miroslav Krleža (pronounced [mǐroslaʋ kř̩leʒa]; 7 July 1893 – 29 December 1981) was a Croatian writer, widely considered to be the greatest of the 20th century. He wrote notable works in several literary genres, including poetry (The Ballads of Petrica Kerempuh, 1936), theater (Messrs. Glembay, 1929), short story collections (The Croatian God Mars, 1922), novels (The Return of Philip Latinowicz, 1932; On the Edge of Reason, 1938), and an intimate diary. His works often include themes of bourgeois hypocrisy and conformism in Austria-Hungary and the Kingdom of Yugoslavia. Krleža wrote numerous essays on problems of art, history, politics, literature, philosophy, and military strategy, and was known as one of the great polemicists of the century. His style combines visionary poetic language and sarcasm.

Krleža dominated the cultural life of Croatia and Yugoslavia for half a century. A "Communist of his own making", he was criticized in Communist circles in the 1930s for his refusal to submit to the tenets of socialist realism. After the Second World War, he held various cultural posts in Socialist Yugoslavia, and was most notably the director of the Yugoslav Lexicographical Institute and a constant advisor on cultural affairs to President Tito. After the break with Stalin, his speech at the 1952 Congress of Yugoslav Writers signaled a new era of comparative freedom in Yugoslav literature.

== Biography ==
Miroslav Krleža was born in Zagreb, the son of a constable. He enrolled in a preparatory military school in Pécs, modern-day Hungary. At that time, Pécs and Zagreb were within the Austro-Hungarian Empire. Subsequently, he attended the Ludoviceum military academy at Budapest. He defected to Serbia, but was dismissed as a suspected spy. Upon his return to Croatia, he was demoted in the Austro-Hungarian army and sent as a common soldier to the Eastern front in World War I. In the post-World War I period, Krleža established himself both as a major Modernist writer and politically controversial figure in Yugoslavia, a newly created country which encompassed South Slavic lands of the former Habsburg Empire and the kingdoms of Serbia and Montenegro.

Krleža was the driving force behind leftist literary and political reviews Plamen ("The Flame", 1919), Književna republika ("Literary Republic", 1923–1927), Danas ("Today", 1934) and Pečat ("Seal", 1939–1940). He became a member of the Communist Party of Yugoslavia in 1918, but was expelled in 1939 because of his unorthodox views on art, his opposition to Socialist realism, and his unwillingness to give open support to the Great Purge, after the long polemic now known as "the Conflict on the Literary Left", pursued by Krleža alongside virtually every important writer in the Kingdom of Yugoslavia, in the period between the two World Wars. The Party commissar sent to mediate between Krleža and other leftist and party journals was Josip Broz Tito.

After the establishment of the Nazi puppet Independent State of Croatia under Ante Pavelić, Krleža refused to join the Partisans headed by Tito. Following a brief period of social stigmatization after 1945, he was eventually rehabilitated. In 1947, he became vice-president of the Yugoslav Academy of Science and Arts in Zagreb and, from 1958 to 1961, he was president of the Yugoslav Writers' Union. During this time, Croatia's principal state publishing house, Nakladni zavod Hrvatske, published his collected works. Supported by Tito, in 1950 Krleža founded the Yugoslav Institute for Lexicography, holding the position as its head until his death. The institute would be posthumously named after him and is now called the Miroslav Krleža Institute of Lexicography.

From 1950 on, Krleža enjoyed the life of a high-profile writer and intellectual, often closely connected to Tito. He also held the post of president of the Yugoslav Writers' Union between 1958 and 1961. In 1962, he received the NIN Award for the novel Zastave ("The Banners"), and in 1968 the Herder Prize.

Following the deaths of Tito in May 1980 and Bela Krleža in April 1981, Krleža spent most of his last years in ill health. He was awarded the Laureate Of The International Botev Prize in 1981. He died in his Villa Gvozd in Zagreb on 29 December 1981 and was given a state funeral in Zagreb on 4 January 1982. In 1986, Villa Gvozd was donated to the City of Zagreb. It was opened to the public in 2001, but has been temporarily closed due to the 2020 Zagreb earthquake damage as of 2021.

== Works ==
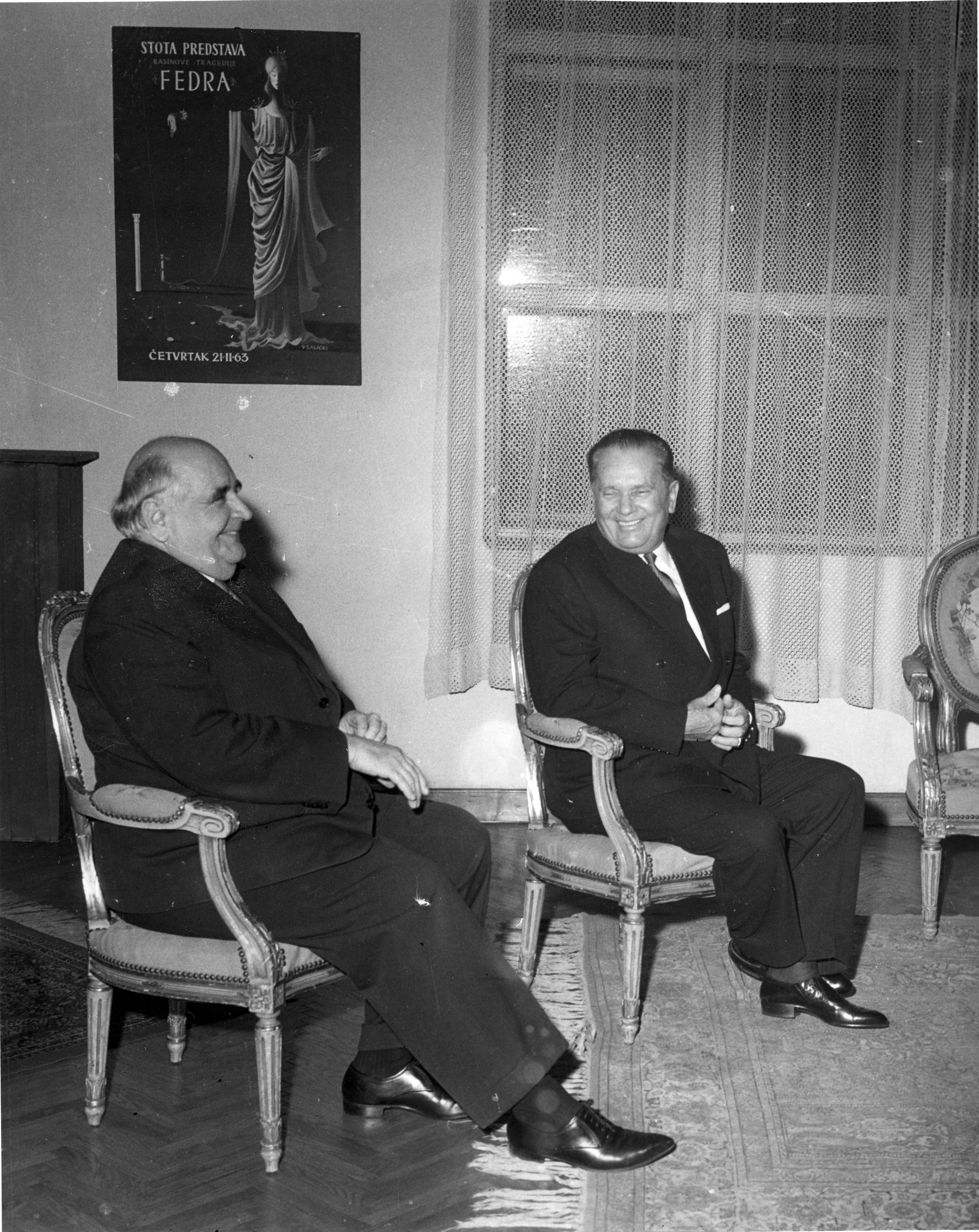
Krleža with President Josip Broz Tito

Krleža's oeuvre can be divided into the following categories:

=== Poetry ===
Although Krleža's lyric poetry is held in high regard, by common critical consensus his greatest poetic work is Balade Petrice Kerempuha (Ballads of Petrica Kerempuh), spanning more than five centuries and centred on the figure of plebeian prophet Petrica Kerempuh, a Croatian Till Eulenspiegel.

=== Novels ===
Krleža's novelistic oeuvre consists of four works: The Return of Philip Latinowicz, On the Edge of Reason, The Banquet in Blitva, and The Banners. The first one is a novel about an artist. On the Edge of Reason and The Banquet in Blitva are satires (the latter located in an imaginary Baltic country and called a political poem), saturated with the atmosphere of all-pervasive totalitarianism, while The Banners has been dubbed a "Croatian War and Peace". It is a multi-volume panoramic view of Croatian (and Central European) society before, during, and after World War I, revolving around the prototypical theme of fathers and sons in conflict. All Krleža's novels except The Banners, have been translated into English.

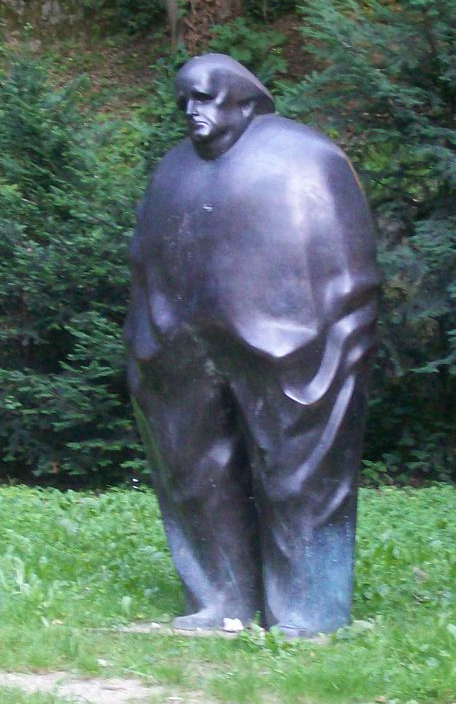
A bronze monument to Miroslav Krleža, created by Marija Ujević-Galetović, was placed in 2004 near the house where he lived for 30 years near Gornji Grad, Zagreb, Croatia

=== Short stories and novellas ===
The most notable collection of Krleža's short stories is the anti-war book Croatian God Mars, on the fates of Croatian soldiers sent to the World War I battlefields.

=== Plays ===
Krleža's main artistic interest was centered on drama. He began with experimental expressionist plays like Adam i Eva and Michelangelo Buonarroti, dealing with defining passions of heroic figures, but eventually opted for more conventional naturalist plays. The best known is Gospoda Glembajevi ("The Glembays"), a cycle dealing with the decay of a bourgeois family. Golgota is another play, political in nature.

=== Diaries and memoirs ===
Krleža's memoirs and diaries include Davni dani ("Olden Days") and Djetinjstvo u Agramu ("Childhood in Zagreb"). Other works include Dnevnici ("Diaries") and the posthumously published Zapisi iz Tržiča ("Notes from Tržič") chronicle multifarious impressions.

== Selected works ==
- Croatian God Mars (Hrvatski bog Mars, 1922)
- Messrs. Glembay (Gospoda Glembajevi, 1928)
- The Return of Philip Latinowicz (Povratak Filipa Latinovicza, 1932)
- The Ballads of Petrica Kerempuh (Balade Petrice Kerempuha, 1936)
- On the Edge of Reason (Na rubu pameti, 1938)
- The Banquet in Blitva (Banket u Blitvi, 1939)
- The Banners (Zastave, 1962)

Translations into English:

Krleža, Miroslav. The Banquet in Blitva (Banket u Blitvi, 1939). Translated by Edward Dennis Goy and Jasna Levinger-Goy. Evanston, IL: Northwestern University Press, 2004.

_____. The Cricket Beneath the Waterfall, and Other Stories (Cvrčak pod vodopadom). Various translators; edited by Branko Lenski. New York: Vanguard Press, 1972.

_____. Harbors Rich in Ships: Selected Revolutionary Writings (The Glembays, 1928, and other early texts). Translated by Željko Cipriš. New York: Monthly Review Press, 2017.

_____. Journey to Russia (Izlet u Rusiju, 1925). Translated by Will Firth. Zagreb: Sandorf, 2017.

_____. On the Edge of Reason (Na rubu pameti, 1938). Translated by Zora Depolo. New York: New Directions, 1995.

_____. The Return of Philip Latinowitz (Povratak Filipa Latinovicza, 1932). Translated by Zora Depolo. Evanston, IL: Northwestern University Press, 1995.

== Sources ==
- Enes Čengić; S Krležom iz dana u dan, Globus, 1986, Zagreb
- (in Croatian) Viktor Žmegač: Krležini europski obzori, 1984, Zagreb
- (in Croatian) "Krležijana": Enciklopedija Miroslava Krleže, LZMK, 1993, Zagreb
- (in Croatian) Stanko Lasić: Krležologija, I-VI, 1987.-1993, Globus, Zagreb

Preceded by Josip Vidmar	President of the Association of Writers of Yugoslavia; 1958-1961	Succeeded by Blaže Koneski
