= 20th century in literature =

Overview of the events of 1900–1999 in literature

Literature of the 20th century refers to world literature produced during the 20th century (1901 to 2000).

The main periods in question are often grouped by scholars as Modernist literature, Postmodern literature, flowering from roughly 1900 to 1940 and 1960 to 1990 respectively, roughly using World War II as a transition point. After 1960, the somewhat malleable term "contemporary literature" widely appears.

Although these terms (modern, contemporary and postmodern) are generally applicable to and stem from Western literary history, scholars often use them in reference to Asian, Latin American and African literatures. Non-western writers, in particular in Postcolonial literature, have been at the forefront of literary evolution during the twentieth century.

Technological advances facilitated lower production cost for books, coupled with rising populations and literacy rates, which resulted in a significant rise in production of popular literature and trivial literature, comparable to the similar developments in music. The division of "popular literature" and "high literature" in the 20th century is overlapped by genres such as detectives or science fiction, despite being largely ignored by mainstream literary criticism for most of the century. These genres developed their own establishments and critical awards; these include the Nebula Award (since 1965), the British Fantasy Award (since 1971) or the Mythopoeic Awards (since 1971).

Towards the end of the 20th century, electronic literature grew in importance in light of the development of hypertext and later the World Wide Web.

The Nobel Prize in Literature was awarded annually throughout the century (with the exception of 1914, 1918, 1935 and 1940–1943), the first laureate (1901) being Sully Prudhomme. The New York Times Best Seller list has been published since 1942.

The best-selling literary works of the 20th century are estimated to be The Lord of the Rings (1954/55, 150 million copies), Le Petit Prince (The Little Prince, 1943, 140 million copies), Harry Potter and the Philosopher's Stone (1997, 120 million copies) and And Then There Were None (1939, 115 million copies). The Lord of the Rings was also voted "book of the century" in various surveys. Perry Rhodan (1961 to present) proclaimed as the best-selling book series, with an estimated total of 1 billion copies sold.

== 1901–1918 ==
The Fin de siècle movement of the Belle Époque persisted into the 20th century, but was brutally cut short with the outbreak of World War I (an effect depicted e.g. in Thomas Mann's The Magic Mountain, published 1924). The Dada movement of 1916–1920 was at least in part a protest against the bourgeois nationalist and colonialist interests which many Dadaists believed were the root cause of the war; the movement heralded the Surrealism movement of the 1920s.

1900

- Lord Jim by Joseph Conrad (Poland, England)
- The Knights of the Cross by Henryk Sienkiewicz (Poland)

Genre fiction

- The Wonderful Wizard of Oz by L. Frank Baum (US)

1901

- Buddenbrooks by Thomas Mann (Germany)
- The Inheritors by Joseph Conrad and Ford Madox Ford (England)
- Kim by Rudyard Kipling (India, England)

Genre fiction

- The Purple Cloud by M. P. Shiel (Montserrat, England)
- The First Men in the Moon by H. G. Wells (England)

1902

- Heart of Darkness by Joseph Conrad
- The Immoralist by André Gide (France)
- The Wings of the Dove by Henry James (US, England)
- The Grand Babylon Hotel by Arnold Bennett (England)

Genre fiction

- The Hound of the Baskervilles by Arthur Conan Doyle (Scotland)
- Just So Stories by Rudyard Kipling

Plays

- Man and Superman by George Bernard Shaw (Ireland)
- The Lower Depths by Maxim Gorky

1903

- Romance by Joseph Conrad and Ford Madox Ford
- The Ambassadors by Henry James
- The Pit by Frank Norris (US)
- In Wonderland by Knut Hamsun (Norway)

Genre fiction

- The Call of the Wild by Jack London (US)
- The Riddle of the Sands by Erskine Childers (England, Ireland)

1904

- The Golden Bowl by Henry James
- Nostromo by Joseph Conrad
- The Napoleon of Notting Hill by G. K. Chesterton (England)
- The Peasants by Władysław Reymont (Poland)

Genre fiction

- The Food of the Gods by H. G. Wells
- The Sea-Wolf by Jack London
- Green Mansions by William Henry Hudson (Argentina, England)

Plays

- John Bull's Other Island by George Bernard Shaw
- The Cherry Orchard by Anton Chekhov

1905

- Hadrian the Seventh by Frederick Rolfe aka Baron Corvo (England, Italy)
- Where Angels Fear to Tread by E. M. Forster (England)
- Kipps by H. G. Wells
- Songs of Life and Hope by Rubén Darío (Nicaragua)
- The House of Mirth by Edith Wharton (US)
- The Club of Queer Trades by G. K. Chesterton

1906

- The Jungle by Upton Sinclair (US)
- The Confusions of Young Törless by Robert Musil (Austria)
- Mother by Maxim Gorky

Genre fiction

- Puck of Pook's Hill by Rudyard Kipling
- Peter Pan in Kensington Gardens by J. M. Barrie (Scotland)
- Time and the Gods by Lord Dunsany (Ireland, England)
- White Fang by Jack London

Plays

- The Aran Islands by John Millington Synge (Ireland)
- The Morality of Mrs. Dulska by Gabriela Zapolska (Poland)

1907

- Bardidi by Sarat Chandra Chattopadhyay (India)
- The Secret Agent by Joseph Conrad
- The Longest Journey by E. M. Forster
- The Tanners by Robert Walser (Swiss)

Genre fiction

- The Listener and Other Stories by Algernon Blackwood (England) – contains The Willows, one of the first 'cosmic horror' stories
- The Hill of Dreams by Arthur Machen (England)

Plays

- The Playboy of the Western World by John Millington Synge

Poetry

- Cautionary Tales for Children by Hilaire Belloc (France, England)

1908

- The Man Who Was Thursday by G. K. Chesterton
- A Room with a View by E. M. Forster
- The Iron Heel by Jack London
- Hell by Henri Barbusse (France, Russia)
- Penguin Island by Anatole France (France)
- The Assistant by Robert Walser (Swiss)
- The Magician by Somerset Maugham (England, France) – based on the author's meeting with Aleister Crowley

Genre fiction

- The Wind in the Willows by Kenneth Grahame (England)

Poetry

- Personae by Ezra Pound (US, England, Italy) – one of the first examples of 'modernist' poetry

1909

- Martin Eden by Jack London
- Sparrows: the story of an unprotected girl by Horace W C Newte
- Tono-Bungay by H. G. Wells
- Three Lives by Gertrude Stein (US, France)

Poetry

- Exultations by Ezra Pound
- Poems by William Carlos Williams (US)

Plays

- The Blue Bird by Maurice Maeterlinck (Belgium)

1910

- Howards End by E. M. Forster
- The Card by Arnold Bennett
- The History of Mr Polly by H. G. Wells

1911

- Zuleika Dobson by Max Beerbohm (England)
- In a German Pension by Katherine Mansfield (England) – short stories
- Under Western Eyes by Joseph Conrad
- The White Peacock by D. H. Lawrence (England)
- Jennie Gerhardt by Theodore Dreiser (US)
- In Desert and Wilderness by Henryk Sienkiewicz (Poland)

Genre fiction

- Peter and Wendy by J. M. Barrie (Scotland)

1912

- The Trespasser by D. H. Lawrence
- Death in Venice by Thomas Mann (Germany)

Genre fiction

- Riders of the Purple Sage by Zane Grey (US)
- The Lost World by Arthur Conan Doyle
- Tarzan of the Apes by Edgar Rice Burroughs (US)

Plays

- Pygmalion by George Bernard Shaw

1913

- Petersburg by Andrei Bely (Russia)
- Swann's Way by Marcel Proust (France)
- Le Grand Meaulnes by Alain-Fournier (France)
- Sons and Lovers by D. H. Lawrence
- Chance by Joseph Conrad

Genre fiction

- A Prisoner in Fairyland by Algernon Blackwood – adapted into a play, it later became the Andrew Lloyd Webber musical Starlight Express
- The Mystery of Dr. Fu-Manchu by 'Sax Rohmer' (England)

Poetry

- Alcools by Guillaume Apollinaire (Poland, France) – dada poems
- Gitanjali by Rabindranath Tagore

1914

- Dubliners by James Joyce (Ireland, France, Italy) – short stories
- The Prussian Officer and Other Stories by D. H. Lawrence – short stories
- Der Untertan by Heinrich Mann
- The Vatican Cellars by André Gide
- Tender Buttons by Gertrude Stein
- The Golem by Gustav Meyrink (Austria)
- Mist by Miguel de Unamuno (Spain)
- Maurice by E. M. Forster – unpublished
- Sinister Street by Compton Mackenzie (Scotland, Greece)
- The Flying Inn by G. K. Chesterton
- The Ragged-Trousered Philanthropists by Robert Noonan (UK)

Poetry

- North of Boston by Robert Frost (US)

1915

- The Good Soldier by Ford Madox Ford
- The Rainbow by D. H. Lawrence
- The Metamorphosis by Franz Kafka
- Of Human Bondage by Somerset Maugham
- The Underdogs by Mariano Azuela (Mexico)
- Victory by Joseph Conrad
- Pointed Roofs by Dorothy Richardson
- The Voyage Out by Virginia Woolf (England)
- Vainglory by Ronald Firbank (England)
- Rashōmon by Ryūnosuke Akutagawa

Genre fiction

- The Thirty-Nine Steps by John Buchan (Scotland, Canada)

1916

- A Portrait of the Artist as a Young Man by James Joyce
- Women in Love by D. H. Lawrence – initially banned, published in 1920

Genre fiction

- Greenmantle by John Buchan

Poetry

- Salt-Water Poems and Ballads by John Masefield (England)
- Mountain Interval by Robert Frost

1917

- Under Fire by Henri Barbusse (France, Russia)
- Walpurgis Night by Gustav Meyrink
- Growth of the Soil by Knut Hamsun
- The Shadow-Line by Joseph Conrad
- Caprice by Ronald Firbank
- Devdas by Sarat Chandra Chattopadhyay

Poetry

- Dulce et Decorum est and Anthem for Doomed Youth by Wilfred Owen (England) – published posthumously
- Prufrock and Other Observations by T. S. Eliot (US, England)

Non-fiction

- The State and Revolution by Vladimir Lenin

1918

- Tarr by Wyndham Lewis (Canada, England)
- Man of Straw by Heinrich Mann (Germany)

Poetry

- Calligrammes by Guillaume Apollinaire – dada poetry

Non-fiction

- Eminent Victorians by Lytton Strachey (England)
- Reflections of a Nonpolitical Man by Thomas Mann (Germany)

== Interwar period ==
The 1920s were a period of literary creativity, and works of several notable authors appeared during the period. D. H. Lawrence's novel Lady Chatterley's Lover was a scandal at the time because of its explicit descriptions of sex. James Joyce's novel, Ulysses, published in 1922 in Paris, was one of the most important achievements of literary modernism.

1919

- Within a Budding Grove by Marcel Proust
- Night and Day by Virginia Woolf
- Winesburg, Ohio by Sherwood Anderson (US) – the first 'lost generation' novel
- Valmouth by Ronald Firbank
- Bazaar-e-Husn by Premchand (publ. in Hindi as Seva-sadan)

Genre fiction

- Dope by Sax Rohmer – inspired by the true story of Limehouse dope-dealer Brilliant Chang
- Dope Darling by Leda Burke (David Garnett) (England)

1920

- We by Yevgeny Zamyatin (Russia)
- Limbo by Aldous Huxley (England) – short stories
- The Lost Girl by D. H. Lawrence
- This Side of Paradise by F. Scott Fitzgerald (US)
- The London Venture by Michael Arlen (Armenia, England)
- Storm of Steel by Ernst Jünger (Germany)
- A Voyage to Arcturus by David Lindsay (Scotland)
- Main Street by Sinclair Lewis (US)
- The Age of Innocence by Edith Wharton (US)

Plays

- Six Characters in Search of an Author by Luigi Pirandello (Italy)
- Beyond the Horizon and Anna Christie by Eugene O'Neill – Pulitzer prize winner

1921

- The Guermantes Way by Marcel Proust
- Crome Yellow by Aldous Huxley
- England, My England and Other Stories by D. H. Lawrence – short stories
- The Forsyte Saga by John Galsworthy (England) – pentalogy, first volume published in 1906
- My Life and Loves by Frank Harris (England, US) – four volumes of quasi-factual sex gossip, the fifth completed by Alex Trocchi

Plays

- Back to Methuselah by George Bernard Shaw
- R.U.R. (Rossum's Universal Robots) by Karel Čapek – from which the term 'robot' was coined

1922

- Ulysses by James Joyce
- Jacob's Room by Virginia Woolf
- Sodom and Gomorrah by Marcel Proust
- Croatian God Mars by Miroslav Krleža
- The Enormous Room by E. E. Cummings (US)
- Futility by William Gerhardie (Russia, England)
- The Beautiful and Damned by F. Scott Fitzgerald
- Mortal Coils by Aldous Huxley – short stories
- Aaron's Rod by D. H. Lawrence Kim
- The Garden Party by Katherine Mansfield – short stories
- Siddhartha by Hermann Hesse (Germany, Switzerland)
- Peter Whiffle by Carl Van Vechten (US)
- Babbitt by Sinclair Lewis
- Lady into Fox by David Garnett
- The True Story of Ah Q by Lu Xun (China)

Poetry

- The Waste Land by T. S. Eliot

1923

- Confessions of Zeno by Italo Svevo (Italy)
- The Good Soldier Švejk by Jaroslav Hašek (Czechoslovakia)
- The Captive by Marcel Proust
- Kangaroo by D. H. Lawrence
- Antic Hay by Aldous Huxley
- Three Soldiers by John Dos Passos (US)
- The Great American Novel by William Carlos Williams
- The Devil in the Flesh by Raymond Radiguet (France)
- Aelita by Alexey Tolstoy (Russia)

Plays

- The Shadow of a Gunman by Seán O'Casey (Ireland)

Poetry

- New Hampshire by Robert Frost
- The Duino Elegies by Rainer Maria Rilke

1924

- The Magic Mountain by Thomas Mann (Germany)
- In Our Time by Ernest Hemingway (US) – short stories
- A Passage to India by E. M. Forster
- The Vortex by José Eustasio Rivera (Colombia)
- Little Mexican and Other Stories by Aldous Huxley – short stories
- Bohemian Lights by Ramón del Valle-Inclán (Spain)
- The Fox and The Captain's Doll by D. H. Lawrence – short stories
- Miranda by Antoni Lange (Poland)
- Riddles and Conundrums for All Occasions

Genre fiction

- The Murder of Roger Ackroyd by Agatha Christie (England)

Plays

- Juno and the Paycock by Seán O'Casey
- The Vortex by Noël Coward (England)

1925

- Mrs Dalloway by Virginia Woolf
- The Trial by Franz Kafka (Czechoslovakia) – posthumous, first English translation in 1930
- The Great Gatsby by F. Scott Fitzgerald – often described as the epitome of the "Jazz Age" in American literature
- The Green Hat by Michael Arlen – perhaps the epitome of the jazz age in British literature
- Paris Peasant by Louis Aragon (France)
- Albertine disparue by Marcel Proust
- Manhattan Transfer by John Dos Passos
- In the American Grain by William Carlos Williams
- The Desert of Love by François Mauriac (France)
- Gentlemen Prefer Blondes by Anita Loos (US)
- Those Barren Leaves by Aldous Huxley
- St Mawr by D. H. Lawrence – short stories
- The Making of Americans by Gertrude Stein
- Heart of a Dog by Mikhail Bulgakov (Russia / Soviet Union)
- The Artamonov Business by Maxim Gorky (Russia / Soviet Union)

Genre fiction

- Beau Geste by P. C. Wren (England)

Poetry

- The Hollow Men by T. S. Eliot

Non-fiction

- The Old Straight Track by Alfred Watkins (England) – introducing ley lines

1926

- The Castle by Franz Kafka – posthumous, first English translation in 1932
- The Counterfeiters by André Gide
- The Sun Also Rises aka Fiesta by Ernest Hemingway
- Moravagine by Blaise Cendrars (France)
- Don Segundo Sombra by Ricardo Güiraldes (Argentina)
- Nigger Heaven by Carl Van Vechten
- Two or Three Graces and Other Stories by Aldous Huxley – short stories
- The Plumed Serpent by D. H. Lawrence
- The Call of Cthulhu by H. P. Lovecraft

Genre fiction

- Winnie-the-Pooh by A. A. Milne (England)

Poetry

- A Drunk Man Looks at the Thistle by 'Hugh MacDiarmid' (Scotland)

Plays

- The Plough and the Stars by Seán O'Casey
- Raktakarabi by Rabindranath Tagore

Non-fiction

- Seven Pillars of Wisdom by T. E. Lawrence (England, Arabia)

1927

- To the Lighthouse by Virginia Woolf
- Time Regained by Marcel Proust
- Steppenwolf by Hermann Hesse
- Men Without Women by Ernest Hemingway – short stories
- Vestal Fire by Compton Mackenzie
- Dusty Answer by Rosamond Lehmann (England)
- Elmer Gantry by Sinclair Lewis
- The Rocking-Horse Winner by D. H. Lawrence – short stories

Poetry

- Jhôra Palok by Jibanananda Das (India)

Plays

- The Silver Tassie by Seán O'Casey (Ireland)

1928

- Berlin Alexanderplatz by Alfred Döblin (Germany)
- Nadja by André Breton (France)
- Story of the Eye by Georges Bataille (France)
- Parade's End by Ford Madox Ford – war tetralogy, first volume in 1926
- Gypsy Ballads by Federico García Lorca
- Point Counter Point by Aldous Huxley
- Lady Chatterley's Lover by D. H. Lawrence – banned until 1963
- Decline and Fall by Evelyn Waugh (England)
- Amerika by Franz Kafka – posthumous, first English translation in 1938
- All Quiet on the Western Front by Erich Maria Remarque (Germany) – recounts the horrors of World War I and also the deep detachment from German civilian life felt by many men returning from the front
- Chevengur by Andrei Platonov (Soviet Russia, excerpts)
- The City by Valerian Pidmohylny (Soviet Ukraine)

Plays

- Strange Interlude by Eugene O'Neill (US) – Pulitzer prize winner
- Messrs. Glembay by Miroslav Krleža

1929

- Les Enfants Terribles by Jean Cocteau (France)
- A Farewell to Arms by Ernest Hemingway (US)
- Look Homeward, Angel by Thomas Wolfe
- Death of a Hero by Richard Aldington (England)
- The Sound and the Fury by William Faulkner (US)
- Doña Bárbara by Rómulo Gallegos (Venezuela)
- Grand Hotel by Vicki Baum (Germany)
- Mario and the Magician by Thomas Mann (Germany)
- The Escaped Cock by D. H. Lawrence (England)
- The Defence by Vladimir Nabokov (Russia, France)
- Wolf Solent by John Cowper Powys (England)
- The Good Companions by J. B. Priestley (England)

Non-fiction

- Good-Bye to All That by Robert Graves (England)
- A Room of One's Own by Virginia Woolf (England)

Genre fiction

- Red Harvest by Dashiell Hammett (US) – the first hard-boiled American detective novel
- Yogayog by Rabindranath Tagore (India) – original fiction in Bengali

1930

- Vile Bodies by Evelyn Waugh
- The Apes of God by Wyndham Lewis
- Brief Candles by Aldous Huxley – short stories
- As I Lay Dying by William Faulkner
- Narcissus and Goldmund by Hermann Hesse
- Angel Pavement by J. B. Priestley
- The Virgin and the Gypsy and Love Among the Haystacks by D. H. Lawrence – short stories

Genre fiction

- Last and First Men by Olaf Stapledon (England)
- The Maltese Falcon by Dashiell Hammett (US)

Poetry

- Whoroscope by Samuel Beckett (Ireland, France)

Plays

- Private Lives by Noël Coward

Non-fiction

- Memoirs of a Fox-Hunting Man by Siegfried Sassoon (England) – 2 volumes, 1st in 1929

1931

- The Good Earth by Pearl S. Buck
- The Waves by Virginia Woolf
- Night Flight by Antoine de Saint-Exupéry (France)

Genre fiction

- The Glass Key by Dashiell Hammett
- At the Mountains of Madness by H. P. Lovecraft

Plays

- Mourning Becomes Electra by Eugene O'Neill
- Cavalcade by Noël Coward

Non-fiction

- Axel's Castle by Edmund Wilson (US)
- Music at Night by Aldous Huxley

1932

- The Return of Philip Latinowicz by Miroslav Krleža
- Journey to the End of Night by Louis-Ferdinand Céline (France)
- Brave New World by Aldous Huxley (England)
- The Memorial by Christopher Isherwood (England)
- Laughter in the Dark by Vladimir Nabokov (Russia, France)
- Light in August by William Faulkner
- A Glastonbury Romance by John Cowper Powys
- Stamboul Train by Graham Greene (England)
- Black Mischief by Evelyn Waugh
- Radetzky March by Joseph Roth (Austria)
- Jew Boy by Simon Blumenfeld (England)

Poetry

- The Orators by W. H. Auden (England)

1933

- Man's Fate by André Malraux (France)
- Love on the Dole by Walter Greenwood (England)
- Miss Lonelyhearts by Nathanael West (US)
- The Autobiography of Alice B. Toklas by Gertrude Stein
- Cat Country by Lao She (China)

Genre fiction

- Lost Horizon by James Hilton (England)
- Murder Must Advertise by Dorothy L. Sayers (England)
- The Oppermanns by Lion Feuchtwanger

Non-fiction

- Down and Out in Paris and London by George Orwell (England)
- Texts and Pretexts by Aldous Huxley
- In Praise of Shadows by Jun'ichirō Tanizaki

1934

- Tropic of Cancer by Henry Miller (US) – a groundbreaking obscenity case before the U.S. Supreme Court in 1961 allowed its publication there
- Call It Sleep by Henry Roth (Austria, US)
- Tender Is the Night by F. Scott Fitzgerald
- Threepenny Novel by Bertolt Brecht (Germany)
- Despair by Vladimir Nabokov
- It's a Battlefield by Graham Greene
- A Handful of Dust by Evelyn Waugh
- 20,000 Streets Under the Sky by Patrick Hamilton (England)
- Voyage in the Dark by Jean Rhys (Dominica, France, England)
- Appointment in Samarra by John O'Hara (US)
- A Scots Quair by Lewis Grassic Gibbon (Scotland) – trilogy, first volume published in 1932
- Independent People by Halldór Laxness (Iceland)
- Novel with Cocaine aka Cocain Romance by M. Ageyev (France)

Genre fiction

- The Postman Always Rings Twice by James M. Cain (US)

Poetry

- 18 Poems by Dylan Thomas (Wales)

Non-fiction

- Burmese Days by George Orwell
- Death in the Afternoon by Ernest Hemingway

1935

- Mr Norris Changes Trains by Christopher Isherwood
- Eyeless in Gaza by Aldous Huxley
- Auto-da-Fe by Elias Canetti (Bulgaria, Germany)
- A Clergyman's Daughter by George Orwell
- England Made Me by Graham Greene
- A House in Paris by Elizabeth Bowen (Ireland)
- Tortilla Flat by John Steinbeck (US)
- Studs Lonigan by James T. Farrell (US) – trilogy, first volume published in 1932

Genre fiction

- Little House on the Prairie by Laura Ingalls Wilder (US)

Poetry

- Collected Poems by Cecil Day-Lewis (Northern Ireland)

Plays

- Waiting for Lefty by Clifford Odets (US)

1936

- Death on the Installment Plan by Louis-Ferdinand Céline
- Black Spring by Henry Miller
- U.S.A. by John Dos Passos
- Mephisto by Klaus Mann (Germany, US)
- Absalom, Absalom! by William Faulkner
- Keep the Aspidistra Flying by George Orwell
- Confession of a Murderer by Joseph Roth
- The Blind Owl by Sadegh Hedayat (Iran)
- Invitation to a Beheading by Vladimir Nabokov
- The Wessex Novels by John Cowper Powys (England) – tetralogy, 1st vol published in 1927
- Godaan by Premchand

Poetry

- Ballads of Petrica Kerempuh by Miroslav Krleža
- Dhushor Pandulipi by Jibanananda Das (India)

Genre fiction

- Jamaica Inn by Daphne du Maurier (England)
- Gone with the Wind by Margaret Mitchell (US)
- A Gun for Sale by Graham Greene

1937

- To Have and Have Not by Ernest Hemingway
- The Years by Virginia Woolf
- Of Mice and Men by John Steinbeck
- Lions and Shadows by Christopher Isherwood
- The Black Book by Lawrence Durrell (UK, Egypt)
- Ferdydurke by Witold Gombrowicz (Poland)
- Revenge for Love by Wyndham Lewis
- White Mule by William Carlos Williams
- Wide Boys Never Work by Robert Westerby (England, US)
- Rickshaw Boy by Lao She (China)
- Their Eyes Were Watching God by Zora Neale Hurston
- The Life of Klim Samgin by Maxim Gorky – posthumous, tetralogy, first three volumes published in 1927–1931

Genre fiction

- Star Maker by Olaf Stapledon
- Night and the City by Gerald Kersh (England, US)
- The Face on the Cutting-Room Floor by Cameron McCabe (Ernest Bornemann) (Germany, England)
- The Hobbit by J. R. R. Tolkien (England)

Non-fiction

- The Road to Wigan Pier by George Orwell
- How Green Was My Valley by Richard Llewellyn (Wales)

1938

- Nausea by Jean-Paul Sartre (France)
- Murphy by Samuel Beckett
- Tropic of Capricorn by Henry Miller
- Man's Hope by André Malraux
- The Death of the Heart by Elizabeth Bowen
- Brighton Rock by Graham Greene
- Scoop by Evelyn Waugh
- The Gift by Vladimir Nabokov

Genre fiction

- Brighton Rock by Graham Greene
- Rebecca by Daphne du Maurier

Non-fiction

- Journey to a War by W. H. Auden and Christopher Isherwood
- Homage to Catalonia by George Orwell
- Enemies of Promise by Cyril Connolly (England)

1939

- The Grapes of Wrath by John Steinbeck
- Finnegans Wake by James Joyce
- The Banquet in Blitva by Miroslav Krleža
- At Swim-Two-Birds by Flann O'Brien (Ireland)
- Goodbye to Berlin by Christopher Isherwood
- After Many a Summer by Aldous Huxley
- Coming Up for Air by George Orwell
- On the Marble Cliffs by Ernst Jünger
- Good Morning, Midnight by Jean Rhys
- The Day of the Locust by Nathanael West
- The Legend of the Holy Drinker by Joseph Roth
- Lotte in Weimar by Thomas Mann
- The Confidential Agent by Graham Greene
- Mister Johnson by Joyce Cary (Ireland)
- Wind, Sand and Stars by Antoine de Saint-Exupéry
- Beware of Pity by Stefan Zweig (Austria)
- Pal Joey by John O'Hara

Genre fiction

- The Big Sleep by Raymond Chandler (US)
- Rogue Male by Geoffrey Household (England)
- The Mask of Dimitrios by Eric Ambler
- And Then There Were None by Agatha Christie

Poetry

- Autumn Journal by Louis MacNeice (N Ireland)
- The Map of Love by Dylan Thomas

Plays

- This Happy Breed by Noël Coward

== World War II ==
1940

- Native Son by Richard Wright (US, France)
- Darkness at Noon by Arthur Koestler (Hungary, England)
- The Master and Margarita by Mikhail Bulgakov – published in English 1966
- For Whom the Bell Tolls by Ernest Hemingway
- The Power and the Glory by Graham Greene
- The Heart Is a Lonely Hunter by Carson McCullers (US)
- Portrait of the Artist as a Young Dog by Dylan Thomas
- Owen Glendower by John Cowper Powys
- You Can't Go Home Again by Thomas Wolfe
- And Quiet Flows the Don by Mikhail Sholokhov (Russia) – two volumes, first published in 1934
- The feeling of the world by Carlos Drummond de Andrade (Brazil)

Genre fiction

- Journey into Fear by Eric Ambler (England)
- Farewell, My Lovely by Raymond Chandler

Plays

- The Iceman Cometh by Eugene O'Neill

Non-fiction

- To the Finland Station by Edmund Wilson

1941

- Hangover Square by Patrick Hamilton
- Reflections in a Golden Eye by Carson McCullers
- The Third Policeman by Flann O'Brien
- The Long Ships by Frans G. Bengtsson (Sweden)

Genre fiction

- Mildred Pierce by James M. Cain

Non-fiction

- Grey Eminence by Aldous Huxley

1942

- The Stranger by Albert Camus (Algeria, France)
- Our Lady of the Flowers by Jean Genet (France)
- Flight to Arras by Antoine de Saint-Exupéry

Plays

- The Flies by Jean-Paul Sartre

1943

- Arrival and Departure by Arthur Koestler
- The Ministry of Fear by Graham Greene
- The Human Comedy by William Saroyan
- A Tree Grows in Brooklyn by Betty Smith
- Near to the Wild Heart by Clarice Lispector (Brazil)
- The Man Without Qualities by Robert Musil (Austria) – trilogy, first volume published 1930

Genre fiction

- Double Indemnity by James M. Cain
- The Little Prince by Antoine de Saint-Exupéry (France)

Poetry

- Selected Poems by Keith Douglas (England)

Non-fiction

- Being and Nothingness by Jean-Paul Sartre
- The Myth of Sisyphus by Albert Camus

1944

- The Horse's Mouth by Joyce Cary
- Ficciones by Jorge Luis Borges (Argentina) – short stories
- The Razor's Edge by Somerset Maugham
- Time Must Have a Stop by Aldous Huxley

Plays

- The Glass Menagerie by Tennessee Williams (US)

1945

- Black Boy by Richard Wright (author)
- Animal Farm by George Orwell
- Watt by Samuel Beckett – published in 1953
- Brideshead Revisited by Evelyn Waugh
- Black Boy by Richard Wright
- Lark Rise to Candleford by Flora Thompson (England) – trilogy, first volume in 1939

Genre fiction

- If He Hollers Let Him Go by Chester Himes (US, France)
- The Space Trilogy by C. S. Lewis (N Ireland) – first volume published in 1938

1946

- Cry, the Beloved Country by Alan Paton (South Africa)
- The Miracle of the Rose by Jean Genet
- El Señor Presidente by Miguel Ángel Asturias (Guatemala)
- Froth on the Daydream by Boris Vian (France)
- The Member of the Wedding by Carson McCullers

Poetry

- Deaths and Entrances by Dylan Thomas

Plays

- The Winslow Boy by Terence Rattigan (England)

Non-fiction

- Alamein to Zem Zem by Keith Douglas
- Memoirs of Hecate County by Edmund Wilson
- This Way for the Gas, Ladies and Gentlemen by Tadeusz Borowski (Poland)

1947

- The Plague by Albert Camus
- Under the Volcano by Malcolm Lowry (England, Canada)
- Bend Sinister by Vladimir Nabokov
- The Victim by Saul Bellow (Canada, US)
- The Evenings by Gerard Reve (Netherlands)
- The Conformist by Alberto Moravia (Italy)
- The Middle of the Journey by Lionel Trilling (US)
- Slaves of Solitude by Patrick Hamilton
- Of Love and Hunger by Julian MacLaren-Ross (England)
- Funeral Rites by Jean Genet
- Snow Country by Yasunari Kawabata

Plays

- A Streetcar Named Desire by Tennessee Williams

Non-fiction

- The Diary of a Young Girl by Anne Frank (Netherlands)

1948

- The Naked and the Dead by Norman Mailer (US)
- Confessions of a Mask by Yukio Mishima (Japan)
- The Makioka Sisters by Jun'ichirō Tanizaki (Japan)
- No Longer Human by Osamu Dazai (Japan)
- The Heart of the Matter by Graham Greene
- The Tunnel by Ernesto Sabato (Argentina)
- The City and the Pillar by Gore Vidal (US)
- Ape and Essence by Aldous Huxley
- Last of the Conquerors by William Gardner Smith
- Ashes and Diamonds by Jerzy Andrzejewski (Poland)
- Querelle of Brest by Jean Genet

Genre fiction

- No Orchids for Miss Blandish by James Hadley Chase (England)

Plays

- The Browning Version by Terence Rattigan

Non-fiction

- The Second Sex by Simone de Beauvoir (France — early feminist study)
- The Kon-Tiki Expedition by Thor Heyerdahl (Norway)

1949

- Nineteen Eighty-Four by George Orwell
- The Roads to Freedom by Jean-Paul Sartre – trilogy, first volume published 1945
- The Thief's Journal by Jean Genet
- The Man with the Golden Arm by Nelson Algren (US)
- The Train Was on Time by Heinrich Böll (Germany)
- The Aleph by Jorge Luis Borges
- The Hunting Gun by Yasushi Inoue (Japan)
- The Kingdom of this World by Alejo Carpentier (Mexico)
- The Heat of the Day by Elizabeth Bowen

Genre fiction

- The Trouble with Harry by Jack Trevor Story (England)
- The Mating Season by P. G. Wodehouse

Plays

- Death of a Salesman by Arthur Miller (US)

== Postwar period ==
The intermediate postwar period separating "Modernism" from "Postmodernism" (1950s literature) is the floruit of the Beat Generation and the classical science fiction of Isaac Asimov, Arthur C. Clarke and Robert A. Heinlein. This period also saw the publication of Samuel Beckett's trilogy of novels, Molloy, Malone Dies, and The Unnameable, which enacted the dissolution of the self-identical human subject and inspired later novelists such as Thomas Bernhard, John Banville, and David Markson. The first works of electronic literature were written in the 1950s.

1950

- Scenes from Provincial Life by William Cooper (England) – the first of the British 1950s 'kitchen sink' novels
- Canto General by Pablo Neruda

Plays

- The Bald Soprano by Eugène Ionesco (Romania, France)

Genre fiction

- A Town Like Alice by Nevil Shute (England, Australia)
- Strangers On a Train by Patricia Highsmith (US)

Non-fiction

- The Authoritarian Personality by Theodor Adorno (Germany, US)

1951

- Molloy by Samuel Beckett (Ireland, France)
- Malone Dies by Samuel Beckett (Ireland, France)
- The Catcher in the Rye by J. D. Salinger (US)
- The Hive by Camilo José Cela (Spain)
- Porius (A Romance of the Dark Ages) by John Cowper Powys (England)
- The Grass Harp by Truman Capote (US)
- Memoirs of Hadrian by Marguerite Yourcenar (France)
- The Opposing Shore by Julien Gracq (France)

Plays

- The Lesson by Eugène Ionesco (Romania, France)

Non-fiction

- The Rebel by Albert Camus (France)

1952

- Invisible Man by Ralph Ellison (US)
- Wise Blood by Flannery O'Connor (US)
- Go by John Clellon Holmes (US) – the first Beat novel
- The Natural by Bernard Malamud (US)
- The Old Man and the Sea by Ernest Hemingway
- East of Eden by John Steinbeck
- Love Letter Generator by Christopher Strachey

Genre fiction

- The Tiger in the Smoke by Margery Allingham (England)
- The Killer Inside Me by Jim Thompson (US)

Plays

- The Chairs by Eugène Ionesco (Romania, France)

1953

- The Unnameable by Samuel Beckett (Ireland, France)
- Junkie and Queer by William S. Burroughs (US)
- Go Tell It On the Mountain by James Baldwin (US, France)
- The Outsider by Richard Wright
- The Go-Between by L. P. Hartley
- The Adventures of Augie March by Saul Bellow
- The Captive Mind by Czesław Miłosz (Poland)
- Hurry on Down by John Wain (England) – the first 'angry young man' novel

Genre fiction

- Casino Royale by Ian Fleming (England, Jamaica) – first James Bond novel
- The Long Goodbye by Raymond Chandler
- Childhood's End by Arthur C. Clarke (England, Sri Lanka)
- Foundation by Isaac Asimov (US) – trilogy, first volume published in 1951
- Prelude to a Certain Midnight by Gerald Kersh

Plays

- Waiting for Godot by Samuel Beckett

1954

- Lord of the Flies by William Golding (England)
- Lucky Jim by Kingsley Amis (England) – the most famous 'angry young man' novel
- Under the Net by Iris Murdoch (England)
- Bonjour Tristesse by Françoise Sagan (France)

Genre fiction

- Fahrenheit 451 by Ray Bradbury (US)
- Story of O by Pauline Réage (France)

Plays

- Under Milk Wood by Dylan Thomas
- The Quare Fellow by Brendan Behan (Ireland)

Non-fiction

- The Doors of Perception by Aldous Huxley

1955

- Lolita by Vladimir Nabokov
- One by David Karp (US)
- The Quiet American by Graham Greene
- The Bread of Those Early Years by Heinrich Böll
- The Tree of Man by Patrick White (Australia)
- The Inheritors by William Golding
- Pedro Páramo by Juan Rulfo (Mexico)
- The Voyeur by Alain Robbe-Grillet (France)
- The Genius and the Goddess by Aldous Huxley
- The Deer Park by Norman Mailer
- The Recognitions by William Gaddis (US)
- Memed, My Hawk by Yaşar Kemal (Turkey)

Genre fiction

- The Lord of the Rings by J. R. R. Tolkien, first volume in 1954
- The Talented Mr. Ripley by Patricia Highsmith

Plays

- Cat on a Hot Tin Roof by Tennessee Williams
- Bus Stop by William Inge (US)

Poetry

- The Less Deceived by Philip Larkin (England)

1956

- The Fall by Albert Camus
- The Devil to Pay in the Backlands by João Guimarães Rosa
- Giovanni's Room by James Baldwin
- The Lonely Londoners by Samuel Selvon (Trinidad, England)
- A Walk on the Wild Side by Nelson Algren
- The Devil to Pay in the Backlands by João Guimarães Rosa (Brazil)
- Zama by Antonio di Benedetto (Argentina)

Genre fiction

- The Chronicles of Narnia by C. S. Lewis (N Ireland) – seven volumes, first in 1950
- Peyton Place by Grace Metalious
- The Hundred and One Dalmatians by Dodie Smith (England)

Plays

- Look Back In Anger by John Osborne (England) – the first 'angry young man' play

Poetry

- Howl and Other Poems by Allen Ginsberg (US)

Non-fiction

- Heaven and Hell by Aldous Huxley

1957

- On the Road by Jack Kerouac (Canada, US)
- Young Adam by Alexander Trocchi (Scotland)
- Room at the Top by John Braine (England)
- Doctor Zhivago by Boris Pasternak (Russia)
- Voss by Patrick White
- The Assistant by Bernard Malamud
- Second Thoughts by Michel Butor (France)
- Pnin by Vladimir Nabokov
- Cairo Trilogy by Naguib Mahfouz (Egypt)
- Gimpel the Fool by Isaac Bashevis Singer (Poland, US) – short stories, originally published in Yiddish years earlier
- Atlas Shrugged by Ayn Rand (US)

Genre fiction

- On the Beach by Nevil Shute

Plays

- The Room and The Birthday Party by Harold Pinter (England)
- Endgame by Samuel Beckett
- The Entertainer by John Osborne
- Orpheus Descending by Tennessee Williams
- The Visit by Friedrich Dürrenmatt (Switzerland)

Poetry

- Calling Out to Yeti by Wisława Szymborska (Poland)

1958

- If This Is a Man by Primo Levi (Italy)
- Breakfast At Tiffany's by Truman Capote
- The Dharma Bums by Jack Kerouac
- The Leopard by Giuseppe Tomasi (Italy)
- Saturday Night and Sunday Morning by Alan Sillitoe (England)
- A Taste of Honey by Shelagh Delaney (England)
- Things Fall Apart by Chinua Achebe (Nigeria)
- The Bell by Iris Murdoch
- Fowlers End by Gerald Kersh
- Our Man in Havana by Graham Greene
- Candy by Terry Southern (US)

Genre fiction

- Exodus by Leon Uris (US)
- Zimiamvian Trilogy by E. R. Eddison (England) – first volume in 1935
- Molesworth by Geoffrey Willans (England) and Ronald Searle (England, France) – tetralogy, first book in 1954

Plays

- Krapp's Last Tape by Samuel Beckett
- Suddenly, Last Summer by Tennessee Williams

Non-fiction

- The Theatre and Its Double by Antonin Artaud (France)
- Borstal Boy by Brendan Behan

1959

- A Raisin in the Sun by Lorraine Hansberry (United States of America)
- The Tin Drum by Günter Grass (Germany)
- Naked Lunch by William S. Burroughs
- The Last of the Just by André Schwarz-Bart (France)
- Goodbye, Columbus by Philip Roth (US)
- Zazie in the Metro by Raymond Queneau (France)
- Life and Fate by Vasily Grossman (USSR)
- In the Labyrinth by Alain Robbe-Grillet
- The Loneliness of the Long Distance Runner by Alan Sillitoe
- Billy Liar by Keith Waterhouse (England)
- The Long Day Wanes by Anthony Burgess (England) – trilogy, first volume published in 1956
- The Magic Christian by Terry Southern

Genre fiction

- The Gormenghast Trilogy by Mervyn Peake (England) – first volume in 1946
- Flowers for Algernon by Daniel Keyes
- The Getaway by Jim Thompson

Plays

- The Dumb Waiter and The Caretaker by Harold Pinter
- Rhinoceros by Eugène Ionesco

== Cold War period, 1960–1989 ==
1960

- To Kill a Mockingbird by Harper Lee (US)
- The London Trilogy by Colin MacInnes (England) – first volume, Absolute Beginners, published in 1957
- Butcher's Crossing by John Williams
- Cain's Book by Alexander Trocchi (UK, France, US)
- This Sporting Life by David Storey (UK)
- A Burnt-Out Case by Graham Greene
- Hiroshima Mon Amour by Marguerite Duras (France)
- The Ballad of Peckham Rye by Muriel Spark (Scotland)
- The Rosy Crucifixion by Henry Miller (US) – trilogy, first volume published 1949
- The Sot-Weed Factor by John Barth (US)
- The Magician of Lublin by Isaac Bashevis Singer

Non-fiction and Quasi-fiction

- The Morning of the Magicians by Louis Pauwels and Jacques Bergier (France) – the 1960s obsession with the occult starts here. Published in English 1963
- A Canticle for Leibowitz by Walter M. Miller Jr. (US)

1961

- Catch-22 by Joseph Heller (US)
- A House for Mr Biswas by V. S. Naipaul (Trinidad, England)
- Riders in the Chariot by Patrick White
- The Prime of Miss Jean Brodie by Muriel Spark
- A Severed Head by Iris Murdoch
- Sword of Honour by Evelyn Waugh – trilogy, first volume published in 1952
- Revolutionary Road by Richard Yates (US)
- Hear Us O Lord from Heaven Thy Dwelling Place by Malcolm Lowry – posthumous

Genre fiction

- Solaris by Stanisław Lem (Poland)
- Stranger in a Strange Land by Robert A. Heinlein (US)
- The Man in the High Castle by Philip K. Dick (US)

1962

- One Day in the Life of Ivan Denisovich by Aleksandr Solzhenitsyn (Russia)
- A Clockwork Orange and The Wanting Seed by Anthony Burgess (England)
- Pale Fire by Vladimir Nabokov
- Island by Aldous Huxley
- The Time of the Hero by Mario Vargas Llosa (Peru)
- The Golden Notebook by Doris Lessing (Zimbabwe, England)
- The Death of Artemio Cruz by Carlos Fuentes (Mexico)
- The Alexandria Quartet by Lawrence Durrell – first volume published 1957
- The Woman in the Dunes by Kōbō Abe (Japan)
- Big Sur by Jack Kerouac – the last of the Lost Generation at the end of the Beat Generation

Genre fiction

- The IPCRESS File by Len Deighton (England) – first of the Harry Palmer novels

Non-fiction

- Silent Spring by Rachel Carson (US) – the first major popular study on the deterioration of the environment

1963

- V. by Thomas Pynchon (US)
- Family Lexicon by Natalia Ginzburg (Italy)
- The Bell Jar by Sylvia Plath (US, England)
- Hopscotch by Julio Cortázar (Argentina)
- One Flew Over the Cuckoo's Nest by Ken Kesey (US)
- The Collector by John Fowles (England)
- The Lowlife by Alexander Baron (England)
- The Sailor Who Fell from Grace with the Sea by Yukio Mishima (Japan)
- Cat's Cradle by Kurt Vonnegut (US)

Genre fiction

- Planet of the Apes by Pierre Boulle (France)
- The Spy Who Came in from the Cold by John le Carré (England)
- The Grifters by Jim Thompson

Non-fiction

- The Truce by Primo Levi

1964

- Herzog by Saul Bellow
- A Single Man by Christopher Isherwood
- Last Exit to Brooklyn by Hubert Selby (US)
- The Spire by William Golding (England)
- Nothing Like the Sun by Anthony Burgess
- A Personal Matter by Kenzaburō Ōe (Japan)
- Atmaprakash by Sunil Gangopadhyay (India)
- I Never Promised You a Rose Garden by Joanne Greenberg
- The Search by Naguib Mahfouz (Egypt)

Genre fiction

- Charlie and the Chocolate Factory by Roald Dahl (UK)
- The Three Stigmata of Palmer Eldritch by Philip K. Dick (US)
- Little Big Man by Thomas Berger (US)

Non-fiction

- Understanding Media by Marshall McLuhan (Canada)

1965

- The Magus by John Fowles
- The Interpreters by Wole Soyinka (Nigeria)
- Stoner by John Williams (US)
- Cosmicomics by Italo Calvino (Italy)
- The Painted Bird by Jerzy Kosinski (Poland, US)
- Here We Go Round the Mulberry Bush by Hunter Davies (England) – the kitchen sink novel mutates into the swinging 1960s novel

Genre fiction

- The Cyberiad by Stanisław Lem

Plays

- Marat/Sade by Peter Weiss (Germany, Sweden)
- Tango by Sławomir Mrożek (Poland)

Poetry

- Briggflatts by Basil Bunting

Non-fiction and Quasi-fiction

- The Kandy-Kolored Tangerine-Flake Streamline Baby by Tom Wolfe (US)
- The Autobiography of Malcolm X by Alex Haley (US)

1966

- A Man of the People by Chinua Achebe (Nigeria)
- Alfie by Bill Naughton (England)
- The Comedians by Graham Greene
- The Last Picture Show by Larry McMurtry
- Wide Sargasso Sea by Jean Rhys
- Tremor of Intent by Anthony Burgess

Genre fiction

- Pavane by Keith Roberts (England)
- The Anti-Death League by Kingsley Amis

Non-fiction and Quasi-fiction

- In Cold Blood by Truman Capote
- Hell's Angels: The Strange and Terrible Saga of the Outlaw Motorcycle Gangs by Hunter S. Thompson (US)
- Been Down So Long It Looks Like Up to Me by Richard Fariña (US)

1967

- One Hundred Years of Solitude by Gabriel García Márquez (Colombia)
- The Crying of Lot 49 by Thomas Pynchon
- The Vendor of Sweets by R. K. Narayan (India)
- The Magic Toyshop by Angela Carter (England)
- Poor Cow by Nell Dunn
- A Grain of Wheat by Ngũgĩ wa Thiong'o

Non-fiction

- In the First Circle by Aleksandr Solzhenitsyn
- The Medium is the Message by Marshall McLuhan and Quentin Fiore

1968

- Cocksure by Mordecai Richler (Canada)
- Couples by John Updike (US)
- The Public Image by Muriel Spark
- Lunar Caustic by Malcolm Lowry – posthumous
- The Abyss by Marguerite Yourcenar

Non-fiction and quasi-fiction

- Cancer Ward by Aleksandr Solzhenitsyn
- The Electric Kool-Aid Acid Test by Tom Wolfe
- The Armies of the Night and Miami and the Siege of Chicago by Norman Mailer
- Bomb Culture by Jeff Nuttall (England)
- Slouching Towards Bethlehem by Joan Didion (US)
- The Teachings of Don Juan by Carlos Castaneda (US)

1969

- Portnoy's Complaint by Philip Roth
- The French Lieutenant's Woman by John Fowles
- A Void by Georges Perec (France)
- Passacaille by Robert Pinget (France)
- Dark as the Grave wherein my Friend is Laid by Malcolm Lowry – posthumous

Genre fiction

- Barefoot in the Head by Brian Aldiss
- The Final Programme by Michael Moorcock (England, US)
- Slaughterhouse-Five by Kurt Vonnegut (US)
- The Left Hand of Darkness by Ursula K. Le Guin (US)
- The Godfather by Mario Puzo (US)

Non-fiction and Quasi-fiction

- Papillon by Henri Charrière (France)
- I Know Why the Caged Bird Sings by Maya Angelou (US)
- The View Over Atlantis by John Michell (England)

1970

- Play It as It Lays by Joan Didion
- Mr. Sammler's Planet by Saul Bellow
- The Bluest Eye by Toni Morrison
- Being There by Jerzy Kosiński
- The Obscene Bird of Night by José Donoso (Chile)
- October Ferry to Gabriola by Malcolm Lowry – posthumous
- Aranyer Din Ratri by Sunil Gangopadhyay

Genre fiction

- The Hot Rock by Donald E. Westlake (US)
- Deliverance by James Dickey (US)

Non-fiction and Quasi-fiction

- The Female Eunuch by Germaine Greer (Australia, England)
- Groupie by Jenny Fabian (England)
- Playpower by Richard Neville (Australia, England)
- Revolt into Style by George Melly (England)
- Soledad Brother by George Jackson (US) – prison letters
- Soul on Ice by Eldridge Cleaver (US)

1971

- In a Free State by V. S. Naipaul (Trinidad, England)
- M/F by Anthony Burgess
- Our Gang by Philip Roth
- The Dice Man by Luke Rhinehart (US)
- Another Roadside Attraction by Tom Robbins (US)

Genre fiction

- The Day of the Jackal by Frederick Forsyth (England)

Non-fiction and Quasi-fiction

- The Happy Hooker by Xaviera Hollander (Indonesia, Netherlands)
- Fear and Loathing in Las Vegas by Hunter S. Thompson

1972

- The Infernal Desire Machines of Doctor Hoffman by Angela Carter (England)
- Invisible Cities by Italo Calvino
- G by John Berger (England, France)
- The Good for Nothing by Oğuz Atay (Turkey)

Genre fiction

- The Friends of Eddie Coyle by George V. Higgins (US)
- Jonathan Livingston Seagull by Richard Bach (US)
- The Odessa File by Frederick Forsyth

Poetry

- Crossing the Water and Winter Trees by Sylvia Plath

1973

- Gravity's Rainbow by Thomas Pynchon
- Crash by J. G. Ballard (England)
- Season of Anomy by Wole Soyinka (Nigeria)
- Life Is Elsewhere by Milan Kundera (Czechoslovakia, France)
- Sweet Dreams by Michael Frayn (England)
- Fear of Flying by Erica Jong (US)
- The Great American Novel by Philip Roth

Genre fiction

- Frankenstein Unbound by Brian Aldiss

1974

- If Beale Street Could Talk by James Baldwin (US)
- The Conservationist by Nadine Gordimer (South Africa)
- The Fan Man by William Kotzwinkle (US)
- The Lost Honour of Katharina Blum by Heinrich Böll
- I, the Supreme by Augusto Roa Bastos (Paraguay)
- Napoleon Symphony by Anthony Burgess
- Myra Breckinridge and Myron by Gore Vidal – first of pair published in 1968

Genre fiction

- Tinker Tailor Soldier Spy by John le Carré
- Fletch by Gregory Mcdonald (US)

Genre fiction

- Jaws by Peter Benchley (US)

Non-fiction and Quasi-fiction

- All the President's Men by Bob Woodward and Carl Bernstein (US)

Poetry

- Mr. Cogito by Zbigniew Herbert (Poland)

1975

- Humboldt's Gift by Saul Bellow
- The Deptford Trilogy by Robertson Davies – first volume published 1970
- Dead Babies by Martin Amis (England)
- The Autumn of the Patriarch by Gabriel García Márquez
- The History Man by Malcolm Bradbury (England)
- The Periodic Table by Primo Levi – short stories

Genre fiction

- Watership Down by Richard Adams (England)
- The Choirboys by Joseph Wambaugh (US)
- Shōgun by James Clavell (England, US)
- 'Salem's Lot by Stephen King (US)

1976

- Ragtime by EL Doctorow (US)

Genre fiction

- Interview with the Vampire by Anne Rice (US)

Non-fiction and quasi-fiction

- Roots by Alex Haley
- Another Day of Life by Ryszard Kapuściński (Poland)

Poetry

- Christmas O Shiter Sanet Guchho (ক্রিসমাস ও শীতের সনেটগুচ্ছ) by Joy Goswami (West Bengal, India)

Drama

- Death and the King's Horseman by Wole Soyinka

1977

- The Engineer of Human Souls by Josef Škvorecký (Czechoslovakia)
- The Hour of the Star by Clarice Lispector (Brazil)
- Song of Solomon by Toni Morrison (US)

1978

- Success by Martin Amis
- The Sea, the Sea by Iris Murdoch
- Lanark: A Life in Four Books by Alasdair Gray (Scotland)
- Life A User's Manual by Georges Perec
- The Book of Laughter and Forgetting by Milan Kundera
- Jake's Thing by Kingsley Amis
- The World According to Garp by John Irving (US)
- 1985 by Anthony Burgess
- Horatio Stubbs by Brian Aldiss – trilogy, first volume published in 1970

Non-fiction and Quasi-fiction

- The Emperor by Ryszard Kapuściński

Genre fiction

- Rumpole of the Bailey by John Mortimer (England)

1979

- A Bend in the River by V. S. Naipaul
- The Unlimited Dream Company by J. G. Ballard
- Sophie's Choice by William Styron (US)
- Territory of Light by Yūko Tsushima (Japan)

Non-fiction and Quasi-fiction

- The White Album by Joan Didion
- The Right Stuff by Tom Wolfe (US)

1980

- The Name of the Rose by Umberto Eco
- Pascali's Island by Barry Unsworth (England)
- Earthly Powers by Anthony Burgess
- This Earth of Mankind by Pramoedya Ananta Toer (Indonesia)

1981

- Midnight's Children by Salman Rushdie (India, UK)
- The Comfort of Strangers by Ian McEwan (England)
- The White Hotel by D. M. Thomas (England)
- Chronicle of a Death Foretold by Gabriel García Márquez
- What We Talk About When We Talk About Love by Raymond Carver (US) – short stories

Genre fiction

- The Red Dragon by Thomas Harris (US)
- Gorky Park by Martin Cruz Smith (England, Russia)

Non-fiction

- Conversations with an Executioner by Kazimierz Moczarski (Poland)

1982

- Schindler's Ark by Thomas Keneally (Australia)
- An Ice-Cream War by William Boyd (Ghana, Scotland)
- The Color Purple by Alice Walker (US)
- A Wild Sheep Chase by Haruki Murakami

Genre fiction

- Prizzi's Honor by Richard Condon
- Limes Inferior by Janusz A. Zajdel (Poland)

1983

- Waterland by Graham Swift (England)
- Shame by Salman Rushdie
- Erev by Eli Schechtman (USSR, Israel)

Genre fiction

- The Colour of Magic by Terry Pratchett (England) – first book of the Discworld series

1984

- Money by Martin Amis
- Bright Lights, Big City by Jay McInerney (US)
- The Unbearable Lightness of Being by Milan Kundera
- Flaubert's Parrot by Julian Barnes (England)
- Nights at the Circus by Angela Carter
- Enderby by Anthony Burgess – tetralogy, first volume published in 1963
- The Witches of Eastwick by John Updike

Non-fiction

- Empire of the Sun by J. G. Ballard

1985

- Sei Somoy by Sunil Gangopadhyay (India)
- White Noise by Don DeLillo (US)
- Less than Zero by Bret Easton Ellis (US)
- Oranges Are Not the Only Fruit by Jeanette Winterson (England)
- The Accidental Tourist by Anne Tyler (US)
- Hawksmoor by Peter Ackroyd (England)
- Illywhacker by Peter Carey (Australia)
- Satantango by László Krasznahorkai (Hungary)
- The Kingdom of the Wicked by Anthony Burgess
- Blood Meridian by Cormac McCarthy (US)
- Lonesome Dove by Larry McMurtry
- Love in the Time of Cholera by Gabriel García Márquez

Genre fiction

- L.A. Quartet by James Ellroy (US) – tetralogy, first volume published 1984
- The Handmaid's Tale by Margaret Atwood – (US)
- Perfume by Patrick Süskind (Germany)

1986

- Slaves of New York by Tama Janowitz (US)
- The Old Devils by Kingsley Amis
- An Artist of the Floating World by Kazuo Ishiguro (Japan, UK)

Non-fiction

- Decolonising the Mind: The Politics of Language in African Literature by Ngũgĩ wa Thiong'o

1987

- The Satanic Verses by Salman Rushdie
- The Bonfire of the Vanities by Tom Wolfe
- Anthills of the Savannah by Chinua Achebe
- The Alchemist by Paulo Coelho (Brasil)
- The Door by Magda Szabó (Hungary)
- Norwegian Wood by Haruki Murakami (Japan)
- Beloved by Toni Morrison

Genre fiction

- Presumed Innocent by Scott Turow (US)

1988

- Mother London by Michael Moorcock
- Libra by Don DeLillo
- Oscar and Lucinda by Peter Carey (Australia)
- Kitchen by Banana Yoshimoto (Japan)

Genre fiction

- Sprawl by William Gibson (Canada, US) – trilogy, first volume published 1984

1989

- London Fields by Martin Amis
- Foucault's Pendulum by Umberto Eco
- The Remains of the Day by Kazuo Ishiguro
- To the Ends of the Earth by William Golding – trilogy, first volume published 1980
- The Melancholy of Resistance by László Krasznahorkai (Hungary)
- Ghumiyecho, Jhaupata? (ঘুমিয়েছো, ঝাউপাতা?) by Joy Goswami
- The Book of Evidence by John Banville (Ireland)
- The Trick of It by Michael Frayn

== 1990s ==
- The English Patient by Michael Ondaatje
- Slam poetry

1990

- The New York Trilogy by Paul Auster (US) – first volume published 1985
- The Black Book by Orhan Pamuk (Turkey)
- Restoration by Rose Tremain (England)
- Possession by A. S. Byatt (England)
- The Buddha of Suburbia by Hanif Kureishi (England)
- Dirty Weekend by Helen Zahavi (England)
- Vineland by Thomas Pynchon (US)

Genre fiction

- Devil in a Blue Dress by Walter Mosley (US)
- Good Omens by Neil Gaiman and Terry Pratchett

1991

- American Psycho by Bret Easton Ellis (US)
- Generation X: Tales for an Accelerated Culture by Douglas Coupland (Canada)
- The Kitchen God's Wife by Amy Tan (US)

1992

- The Secret History by Donna Tartt (USA)
- The Heather Blazing by Colm Tóibín (Ireland)
- The Pyramid by Ismail Kadare (Albania)
- A Heart So White by Javier Marías (Spain)
- Jesus' Son by Denis Johnson

1993

- A Suitable Boy by Vikram Seth (India)
- How I Became a Nun by César Aira (Argentina)
- Nostalgia by Mircea Cărtărescu (Romania)
- The Virgin Suicides by Jeffrey Eugenides (US)
- The Shipping News by Annie Proulx (US)
- To Live by Yu Hua (China)

1994

- Blood of Elves by Andrzej Sapkowski (Poland)
- The Wind-Up Bird Chronicle by Haruki Murakami (Japan)
- Samarkand by Amin Maalouf (France)
- Blindness by José Saramago (Portugal)
- Whatever by Michel Houellebecq (France)

1995

- The Moor's Last Sigh by Salman Rushdie (UK)
- Big Breasts and Wide Hips by Mo Yan (China)
- The Reader by Bernhard Schlink (Germany)
- The Rings of Saturn by W. G. Sebald (Germany)

1996

- Infinite Jest by David Foster Wallace (US)
- Prathama Alo by Sunil Gangopadhyay (India)

1997

- Underworld by Don DeLillo (US)
- American Pastoral by Philip Roth
- Mason & Dixon by Thomas Ruggles Pynchon
- Nightmare by Zlatko Topčić
- In the Miso Soup by Ryū Murakami (Japan)
- Into Thin Air by Jon Krakauer

Genre fiction

- Northern Lights by Philip Pullman (UK) – first in His Dark Materials trilogy
- Harry Potter and the Philosopher's Stone by J. K. Rowling (UK) – first in series

Non-fiction

- Tuesdays with Morrie by Mitch Albom

1998

- About a Boy (novel) by Nick Hornby
- My Name Is Red by Orhan Pamuk (Turkey)
- The Savage Detectives by Roberto Bolaño (Chile)

1999

- The Perks of Being a Wallflower by Stephen Chbosky (US)
- Interpreter of Maladies by Jhumpa Lahiri (US)
- Disgrace by J. M. Coetzee (South Africa)

Genre fiction

- Battle Royale by Kōshun Takami (Japan)

== See also ==
- American literature
- Experimental literature
- French literature of the 20th century
- List of 20th-century writers
- Literary modernism
- Twentieth-century English literature
- 20th-century music
- Electronic literature
