= Erev (disambiguation) =

Erev is a 1983 novel by Eli Schechtman

Erev or EREV may also refer to:

- Extended range electric vehicle (EREV), a battery electric vehicle with a generator onboard as a range extender
- Erev, a 2005 novel by Alma Shin
- Ido Erev (born 1959), Israeli psychologist

== See also ==
- Hebrew: ערב, romanized: arv, lit. 'evening, eve' The dictionary definition of ערב at Wiktionary
- Yiddish: ערעוו, romanized: erev, lit. 'eve' The dictionary definition of ערעוו at Wiktionary
- "Erev Erev" (Hebrew: ערב ערב, lit. 'Evening After Evening'), 2013 song by Habiluim (Hebrew: הבילויים, lit. 'The Entertainers') off the album Hora Haslama! (Hebrew: !הורה הסלמה, lit. 'Escalation Ordered!')
- Erev Erev (Hebrew: Evening Evening), 1997 album by Shalom Hanoch
