= The Last Sunset =

The Last Sunset may refer to:

- The Last Sunset (album), an album by the band Conception
- The Last Sunset (film), a 1961 western film
- "The Last Sunset" (Space: 1999), an episode of the British TV series Space: 1999
- Last Sunset (novel), 1994, by Eli Schechtman
