= Ringen oyf der Neshome =

Novel by Eli Schechtman

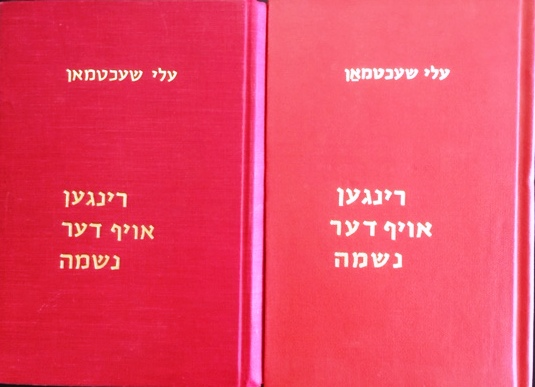
- Rings on the Soul
- Author: Eli Schechtman
- Original title: רינגען אויף דער נשמה
- Language: Yiddish
- Publisher: Tel-Aviv, Yiśroel-bukh
- Publication date: 1981 and 1988
- Publication place: Israel

Ringen oyf der Neshome (Rings on the Soul) is Eli Schechtman's autobiographical novel in two volumes. Volume 1 was published in 1981 and volume 2 was published in 1988. The novel deals with the lives of Jews in Russia and in Israel from the beginning until the end of the twentieth century.

== Overview and publication history ==
The autobiographical novel Ringen oyf der neshome (Rings on the Soul) was written by Eli Schechtman in Israel in two stages. The first two books (Vol 1) were printed in 1981. Then Eli Schechtman had completed work on the 7-volume novel Erev, published in 1983. Only after that, the following two books (Vol 2) were written and published in 1988. The first volume of novel was translated by Y.Gur-Arie into Hebrew and was published twice: the first part was published in 1981 under name Tabaot beneshema, the second one – in 1983 under name Leilot shel kohavim kvuim, and whole volume – in the Classic series in 1992 under name Tabaot beneshema. The novel was translated into Russian by Alma Shin. The first volume was published under the name Кольца на душе in 2001. The second volume was published under the name Вспахать бездну in 2012.

== Plot summary ==
Depicts the life of the Yiddish writer Eli Schechtman from his childhood until his arrival to Jerusalem. Through this autobiographical account, themes of Jewish identity, life under the Soviet regime, as well as culture war between Yiddish and Hebrew are depicted. The novel ends with the words:

"I stand between two worlds and generations,
beth the old wound and the new pain.
Alone,
Completely alone."

== Critical reception ==
This autobiographical novel was not noticed by the authors of the book A Thousand Years of Ashkenazi Culture, which commented about the "inability of the Yiddish culture as a whole ... to write a real autobiography, to reveal your "I" in historical time.

M.Kopeliovich wrote: "The title of the novel conveys the resemblance of a human soul to a tree trunk. And just as tree rings mark the continuous growth of a tree, so “rings on the soul” mark one after another stages of spiritual growth, closely associated with life's trials. Every turn of life, be it joyful or disastrous, cuts a new ring into the soul of the impressionable, as befits a writer ..."

In 1980, Ehud Ben-Ezer had published in the Israeli newspaper Maariv the article about Eli Schechtman under name "Rings of fire in a Jewish soul".

== Translations of novel Ringen oyf der Neshome ==
Eli Schechtman

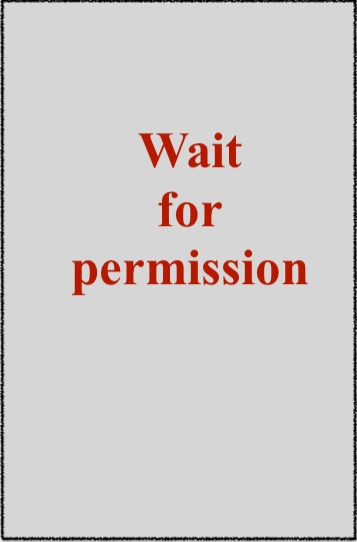
Name:Tabaot beneshama (klassika)
Language: Hebrew
Serie: Clasic
Translator: Y. Gur-Arie
Date: 1992

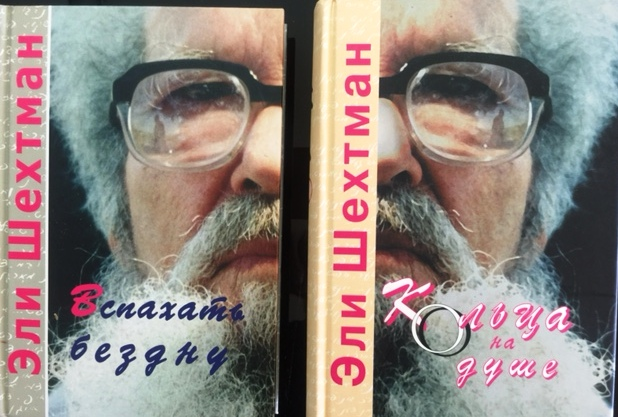
Name:Кольца на душе
Date: 2001
Name:Вспахать бездну
Date: 2012
Language: Russian
Translator : Alma Shin

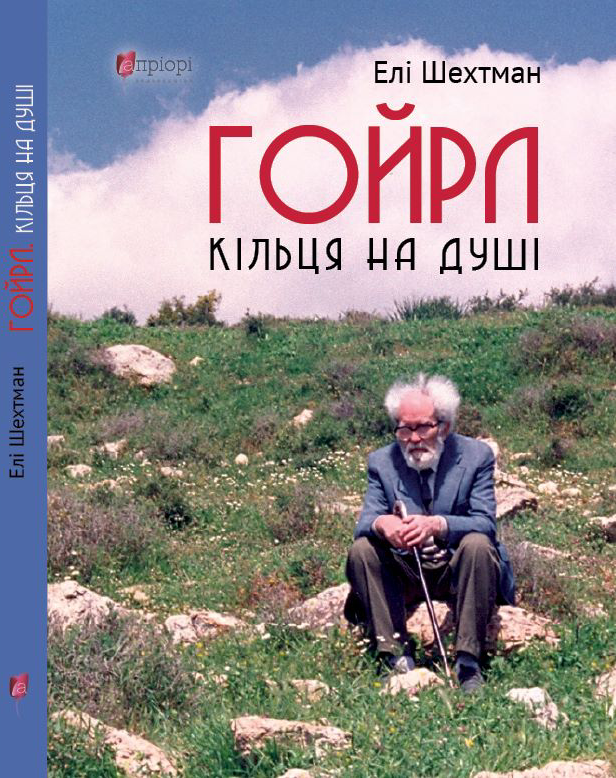
Name: Ґойрл Кільця на душі
Author: Eli Shechtman
Translator : Alma Shin
Language: Ukrainian
Date: 2023
ISBN 978-617629-801-4
