= Alma Shin =

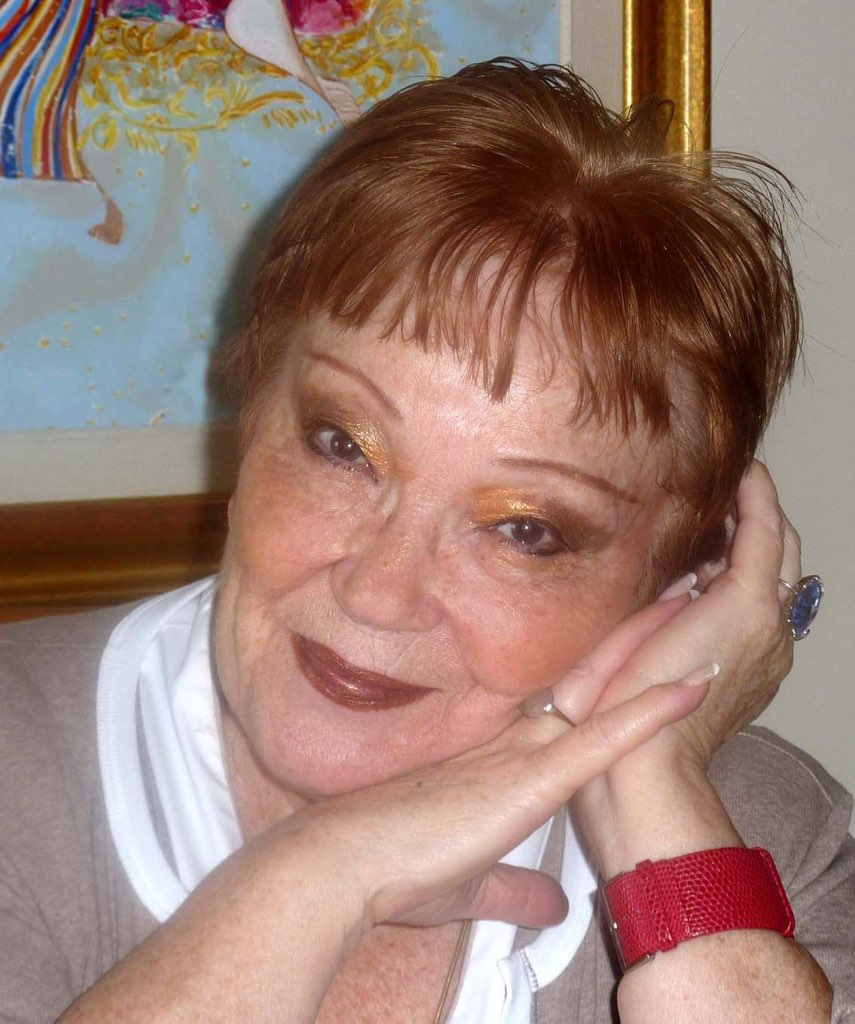
- Berny-Shectman in 2016
- Born: Larisa Elevna Shechtman; 1939, february, 8 Kyiv, USSR (now Ukraine)
- Occupation: Yiddish/Russian translator
- Spouses: Lev Berny (born 1936)
- Children: Eva (born 1964)
- Writing career
- Notable works: Erev, Rings on the Soul

Signature
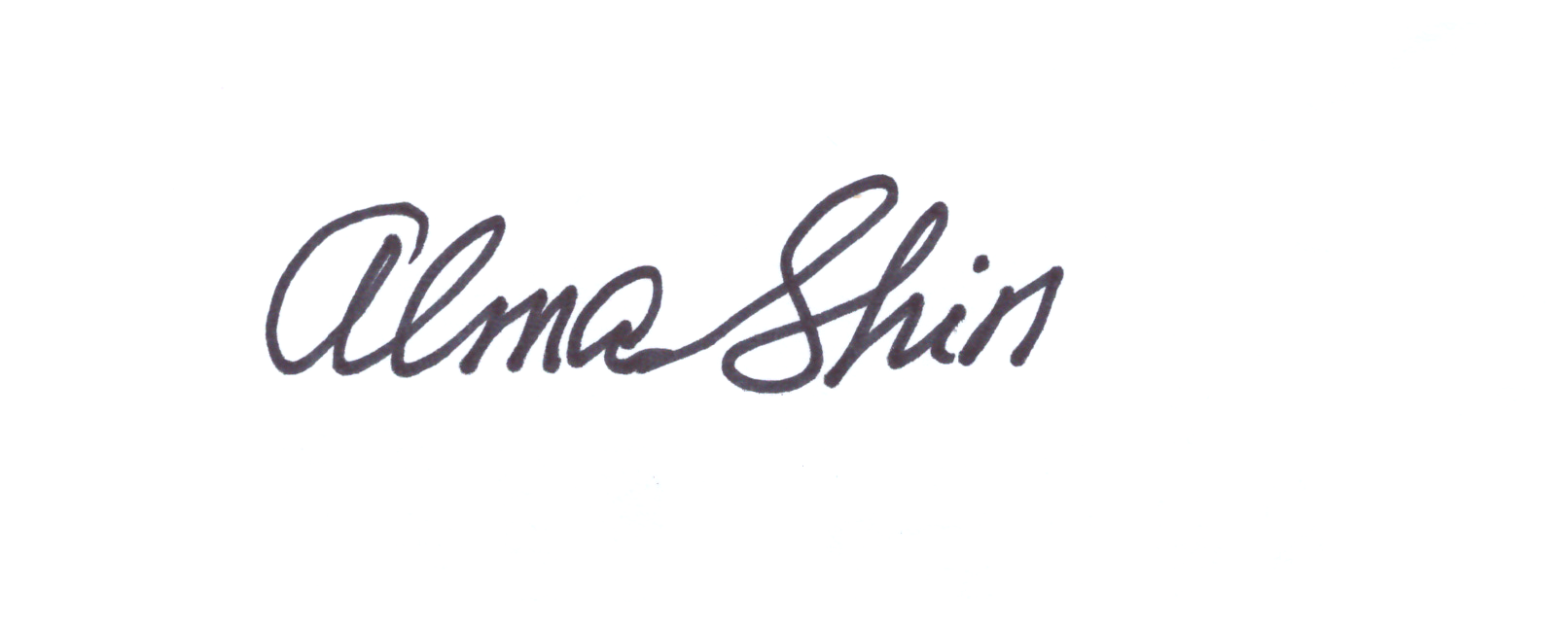

Alma Shin (pseudonym of Larisa Berny-Shectman; born 1939) is a Yiddish-Russian translator of fiction.

== Biography ==
Alma Shin was born into the family of the Jewish writer Eli Schechtman and Jewish actress Sheindl Magazinnik in 1939 in Kyiv. Graduated from the Faculty of Physics and Mathematics of Zhytomyr Pedagogical Institute (now Ivan Franko State University of Zhytomyr), and postgraduate studies at ITEP in Moscow. In 1973, she emigrated to Israel.

== Literary work ==
Alma Shin began her literary career in 1996 by translating the works of Eli Schechtman a prominent Yiddish writer. She translated his entire oeuvre into Russian:

Collection of short stories, "Sonatas" was translated and published at 2000.

Autobiographical novel Rings on the Soul (books 1&2) published at 2001 under the name "Кольца на душе".

Epic novel Erev published at 2005.

Novel The Last Sunset published at 2008.

Novel “Plowing the Abyss” - a sequel to Rings on the Soul (books 3&4) published at 2012 under name "Вспахать бездну"

In 2011, Shin published a Selected Poems of Paul Celan translated from German.

In 2013, she published an autobiography and a Selected Poems from "Written in Memory” by Naftole-Hertz Kohn from Yiddish.

In 2023, Alma Shin published the Ukrainian version of Eli Schechtman's novel Rings on the Soul under name "Ґойрл, Кільца на душі".

== Gallery ==
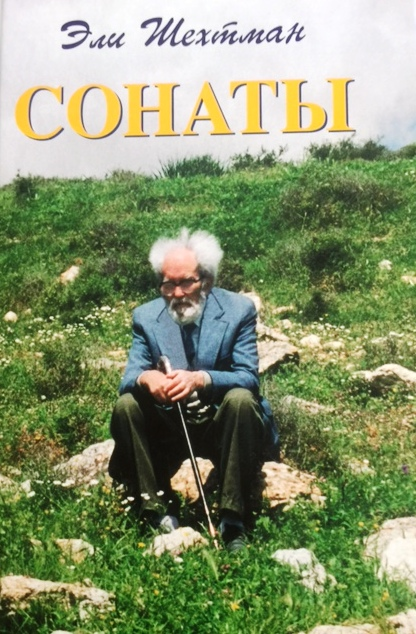
Name: Сонаты
Author: Eli Shechtman
Translator: Alma Shin
Language: Russian
Date: 2000

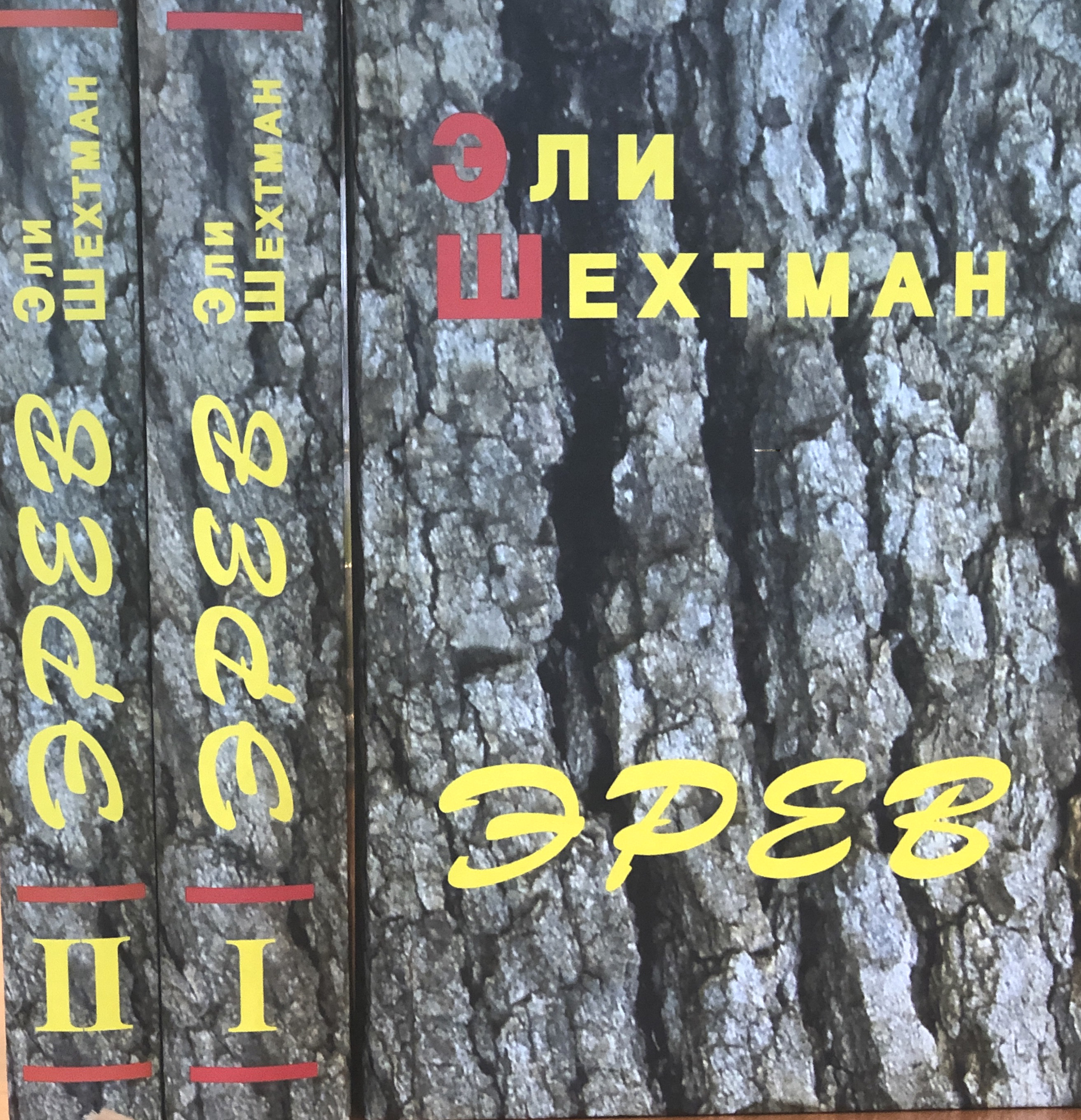
Name: Эрев
Author: Eli Shechtman
Translator: Alma Shin
Language: Russian
Date: 2005

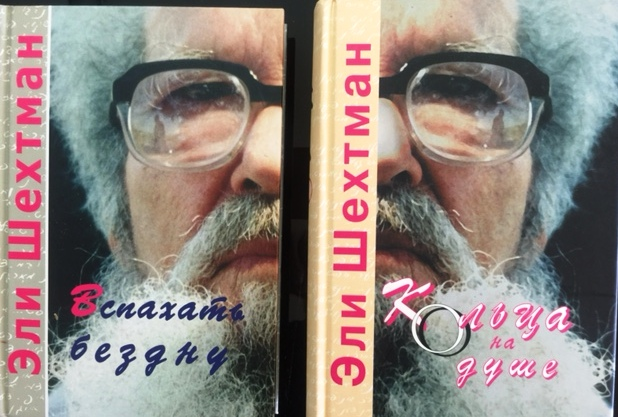
Name: Кольца на душе
Author: Eli Shechtman
Translator: Alma Shin
Language: Russian
Date: 2001
ISBN 965-90212-9-1
Name: Вспахать бездну
Author: Eli Shechtman
Translator: Alma Shin
Language: Russian
Date: 2012
ISBN 978-1-311-45975-6

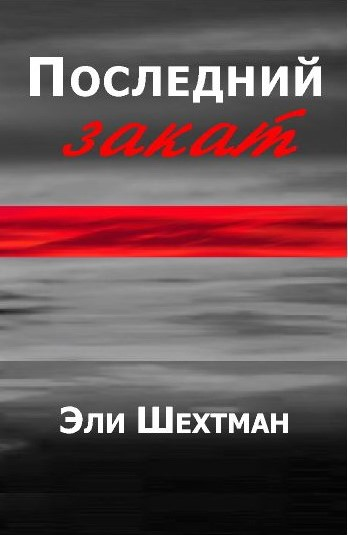
Name: Последний Закат
Author: Eli Shechtman
Translator: Alma Shin
Language: Russian
Date: 2008
ISBN 965-90910-0-1

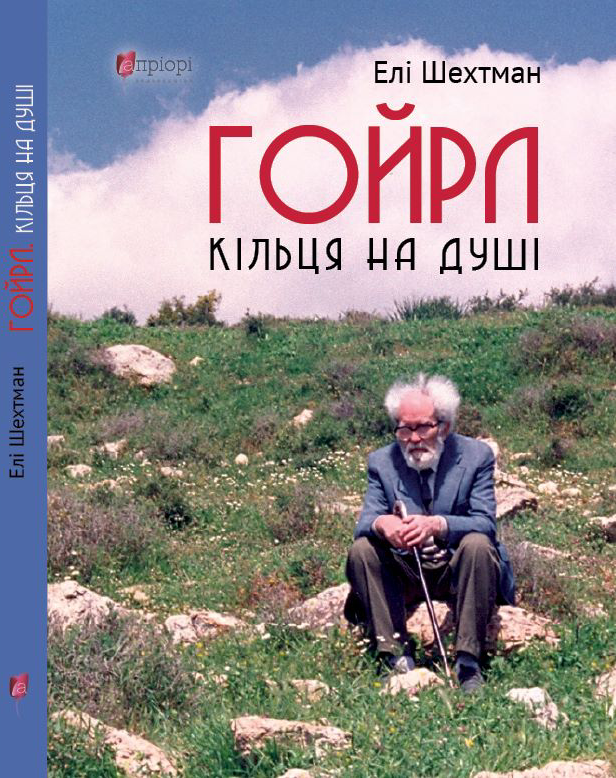
Name: Ґойрл Кільця на душі
Author: Eli Shechtman
Translator: Alma Shin
Language: Ukrainian
Date: 2008
ISBN 978-617629-801-4
