= M. Ageyev =

Pseudonymous Russian novelist

- Born: August 8, 1898; Moscow, Russia
- Died: August 5, 1973 (aged 74); Yerevan, Soviet Union

M. Ageyev (Russian: М. Агеев) was the pen name of the writer of the Russian Novel with Cocaine. He is believed to be Mark Lazarevich Levi (Russian: Марк Ла́заревич Ле́ви; August 8, 1898 – August 5, 1973).

== Biography ==
His best-known work, Novel With Cocaine (also translated as the Cocain Romance), was published in 1934 in the Parisian émigré publication, Numbers. Nikita Struve alleged it to be the work of another Russian author employing a pen name - Vladimir Nabokov; this idea was debunked by Nabokov's son Dmitri in his preface to "The Enchanter", where he claims Ageyev is Mark Levi. Levi's life is shrouded in mystery and conjecture. He returned to the U.S.S.R. in 1942. However, Levi was granted a residence permit not in his native city of Moscow, but in Yerevan, the capital of the Armenian Soviet Republic. There he took a job as a lecturer of German studies at the State university. He died in Yerevan on August 5, 1973.
