= Oyfn Sheydweg =

1930 novel by Eli Schechtman

At the Crossroads
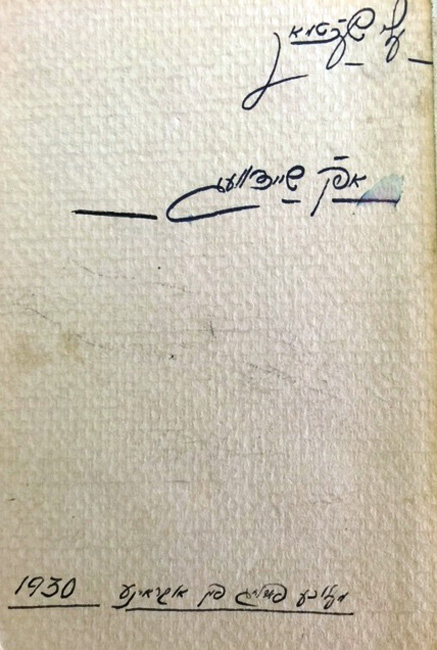
- Author: Eli Schechtman
- Original title: אפן שיידוועג
- Language: Yiddish
- Publisher: Kharḳoṿ; Melukhe-farlag fun Ukraine, 1930
- Publication date: 1930
- Publication place: Ukraine

Oyfn Sheydweg (At the Crossroads) is a 1930 novel by Eli Schechtman. It is his first published work.

== Plot summary ==
The novel describes the decline of the shtetl after the October Revolution. Sсhechtman's heroes go through difficult times of “crossroads”; to the place described by Shekhtman, the revolution “doesn’t drive along a wide highway, but drags heavily in gardens, rolls down a mountain, leaning against the Jews like a thundercloud”.
