= Winter Trees =

Poetry collection

First edition (publ. Faber & Faber)

Winter Trees is a 1971 posthumous collection of poetry by Sylvia Plath, published by her husband Ted Hughes. Along with Crossing the Water it provides the remainder of the poems that Plath had written prior to her death in 1963.

== Contents ==
1. Winter Trees
2. Child
3. Brasilia
4. Gigolo
5. Childless Woman
6. Purdah
7. The Courage of Shutting-Up
8. The Other
9. Stopped Dead
10. The Rabbit Catcher
11. Mystic
12. By Candlelight
13. Lyonnesse
14. Thalidomide
15. For A Fatherless Son
16. Lesbos
17. The Swarm
18. Mary's Song
19. Three Women
