= In Wonderland =

1903 book by Knut Hamsun

In Wonderland (Norwegian: I Æventyrland) is a travelogue written by Knut Hamsun in 1903. It documents Hamsun's impressions during his visit to the Russian Caucasus, Persia and Turkey in 1899.

Sverre Lyngstad translated In Wonderland into English in 2003.
