= Novel with Cocaine =

1934 novel by M. Ageyev

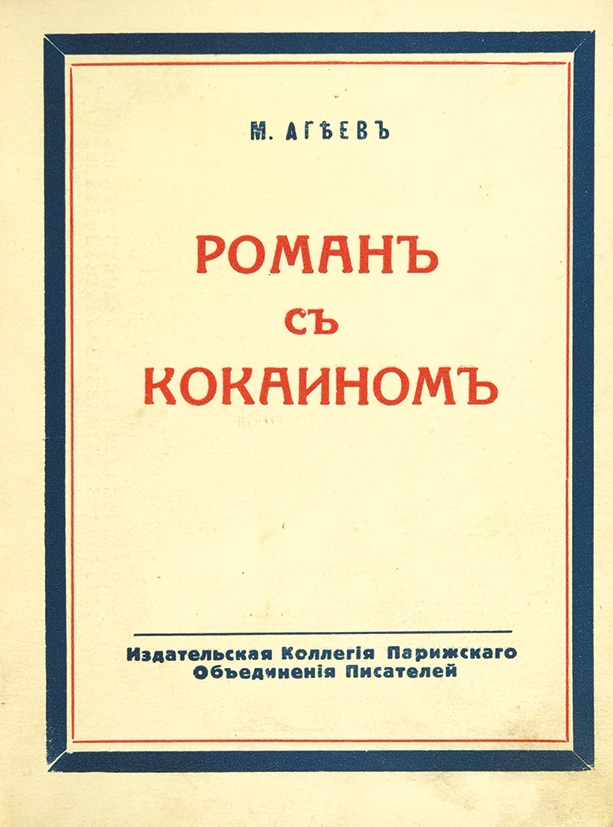
- Cover of the first edition
- Author: M. Ageyev
- Original title: Роман с кокаином
- Language: Russian
- Genre: Bildungsroman
- Publication date: 1934
- Publication place: France

Novel with Cocaine (Russian: Роман с кокаином, romanized: Roman s kokainom, also translated as Cocain Romance and Romance with Cocaine) is a novel first published in 1934 in a Russian émigré literary magazine Chisla (Numbers) under a pen name M. Ageyev. The English translation of the title fails to convey the double meaning of the Russian "Роман," meaning both "novel" and "romance".

== Description ==
Novel with Cocaine is a Dostoevskyan psychological novel of ideas, which explores the interaction between psychology, philosophy, and ideology in its frank portrayal of an adolescent's cocaine addiction. The story relates the formative experiences of narrator Vadim at school and with women before he turns to drug abuse and the philosophical reflections to which it gives rise. Although Ageyev makes little explicit reference to the Russian Revolution of 1917, the novel's obsession with addictive forms of thinking finds resonance in the historical background, in which "our inborn feelings of humanity and justice" provoke "the cruelties and satanic transgressions committed in its name".

== Publication history ==
Following its original publication in Numbers, the novel was published in book form; it was scorned as decadent and disgusting, to use the term applied to it by Vladimir Nabokov. In 1983 the novel was translated into French and published to nearly unanimous praise; an English translation (by Michael Henry Heim) was published in 1984. After the French translation was published, there was some brief speculation in literary circles as to whether Novel with Cocaine might actually be the work of Nabokov, perhaps one of his mystifications; the consensus is now that Nabokov was not the author. Nabokov's son Dmitri addresses this issue in an afterword to his 1986 English translation of VN's novel The Enchanter, in which he claims the author is Mark Levi.

== English translations ==
- Novel with Cocaine, translated by Michael Henry Heim, 1984
- A Romance with Cocaine, translated by Hugh Aplin, 2008

== Censorship ==
In December 2025, the Lukashenko regime added the book to the List of printed publications containing information materials, the distribution of which could harm the national interests of Belarus.
