= The Enchanter =

1939 novella by Vladimir Nabokov

- First edition
- Author: Vladimir Nabokov
- Original title: Волшебник (Volshebnik)
- Translator: Dmitri Nabokov
- Language: Russian
- Publisher: G. P. Putnam's Sons
- Publication date: 1986
- English publication date: 1986
- Pages: 127
- ISBN: 0-399-13211-2
- LC Class: PG3476.N3

The Enchanter (Russian: Волшебник, romanized: Volshebnik) is a novella written by Vladimir Nabokov in Paris in 1939. It was his last work of fiction written in Russian. Nabokov never published it during his lifetime. After his death, his son Dmitri translated the novella into English in 1986 and it was published the following year. Its original Russian version became available in 1991. The story deals with the hebephilia of the protagonist and thus is linked to and presages the Lolita theme.

== History of the manuscript ==
Nabokov showed it to just a few people, and then lost the manuscript in the process of coming to the United States and believed that he had destroyed it. However, he recovered it later in Ithaca in 1959, at a time he had already published Lolita. He reread The Enchanter, and termed it "precise and lucid", but left it alone suggesting that eventually "the Nabokovs" could translate it. Dmitri Nabokov judged it to be an important and mature work of his father and translated and published it posthumously. The published work also contains two author's notes (comments by Vladimir about The Enchanter), and a postscript essay by Dmitri titled On a Book Entitled the Enchanter.

== Plot introduction ==
The story is timeless and placeless. The unnamed protagonist is a middle-aged man who lusts after a certain type of adolescent girl. Infatuated with a specific girl he meets in a park, he marries her mother in order to gain access to her. The mother, already sick, soon passes away, and the daughter is left in his care. He takes her away with the intent of entrapping her in an endless journey, stopping along the French Riviera on the first night of their trip. While she is asleep, he makes his move, only for her to wake up terrified and screaming. Shocked at his own monstrosity, he runs out on the street and jumps in front of a fast truck.

The protagonist is conflicted throughout the story and tries to rationalize his behavior whilst simultaneously being disgusted by it. "How can I come to terms with myself?" is the opening sentence. He makes his moves like a chess player. But once he seems to have reached his goal, he is horrified at the girl's reaction, and the only way to reconcile his monstrosity is to destroy himself.

== Link to Lolita ==
Nabokov himself called The Enchanter his "pre-Lolita". In common is the theme of hebephilia and the basic strategy - to gain access to the girl, the male marries the mother. However, Lolita diverges significantly from its predecessor. Its main characters are named. Charlotte and Dolores have distinct character developments and views, rather than serving as passive pawns in the hebephile's strategy. Dolores is a person in her own right. The resolution differs considerably: Humbert Humbert is upstaged by a rival and murders him; whereas the protagonist of The Enchanter commits suicide. There is no external rival in The Enchanter. Lolita retains echoes of The Enchanter, such as a death in the street (the mother in this case), and a hotel named the “Enchanted Hunters”. Lolita originated in English. Nabokov referred to Lolita as his love affair with the English language. This comment is ironic in itself, because the conclusion of Lolita is an argument by the imprisoned hebephile and murderer that his corrupt history is a love affair. The language of Lolita achieves a level of irony and humor considerably more developed than that of the more prosaic The Enchanter.

== Link to The Gift ==
In Chapter Two of The Gift, Nabokov lets Shchyogolev outline the thematic premise of The Enchanter, namely the stratagem of an hebephile to marry a mother in order to gain access to the daughter. The Gift was written between 1933 and 1938, before The Enchanter.

== Essay by Dmitri Nabokov ==
Echoing Nabokov's On a Book Entitled Lolita, his son added his postscript On a Book Entitled The Enchanter to the translation. Dmitri Nabokov pointed out that his father specifically wanted "Volshebnik" translated as "enchanter" rather than "magician" or "conjuror". The younger Nabokov debunks the book Novel with Cocaine as a fraud which appeared at the same time in the mid-eighties and was supposed to be a posthumously published work of Nabokov. He comments on the complex imagery of The Enchanter: "… the line he (VN) treads is razor thin, and the virtuosity consists in a deliberate vagueness of verbal and visual elements whose sum is a complex… but totally precise unit of communication." He presents a few "special" examples of his father's unique images, his “eerie humor” (the wedding night, the chauffeur foreshadowing Clare Quilty, the Shakespearean night porter, the misplaced room). Dmitri points out that in his father's work, themes may be echoed in later works, but the dissimilarities are substantial.

== See also ==
- Lolita
- Lolita Anime
- Lolita Syndrome
- Lolicon
