= Poems (William Carlos Williams) =

Volume of poems from William Carlos Williams

First edition

Poems is an early self-published volume of poems by William Carlos Williams. It was published in Rutherford, New Jersey in 1909. The name William C. Williams is used for the cover and copyright notice, and W. C. Williams for the title page. The book is printed on Old Stratford paper.

== Table of contents ==
- Innocence
- To Simplicity
- June
- Ballad of Time and the Peasant
- To His Lady with a Queer Name
- The Uses of Poetry
- The Quest of Happiness
- July
- Imitations
- Love
- To a Friend
- To My Better Self
- A Street Market, N. Y., 1908.
- September
- The Loneliness of Life
- Wistfull in Idleness
- On Thinking of a Distant Friend
- To a Lady
- To The Unknown Lady
- November
- On a Proposed Trip South
- The Folly of Preoccupation
- The Bewilderment of Youth
- The Bewilderment of Age
- Hymn to the Spirit of Fraternal Love
- Hymn to Perfection
