= Eli Schechtman =

- עלי שעכטמאן
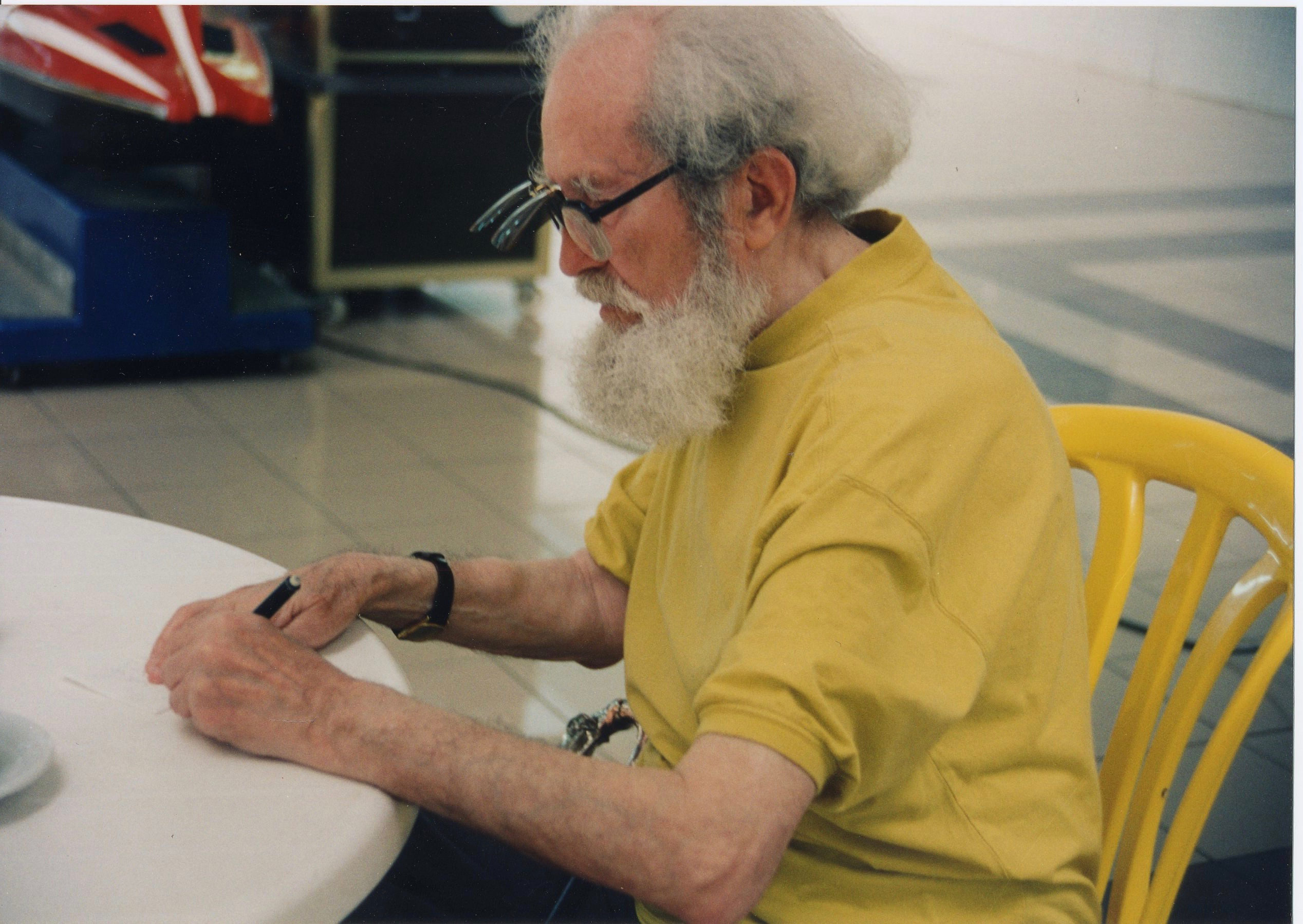
- Born: Eli Ben-Meir ben-Arie Ha-Cohen Schechtman; September 8, 1908; Vaskovychi near Korosten, Russian Empire (now Ukraine)
- Died: January 1, 1996 (aged 87); Haifa, Israel
- Occupation: Writer
- Spouses: Magazinnik Sheindl (1908–1991)
- Children: Lea (1931–2005); Larisa (born 1939
- Writing career
- Genres: Novels, short stories
- Notable works: Erev, Rings on the Soul
- Notable awards: Prime Minister of Israel; Itzik Manger Prize; Chaim Zhitlowsky prize; Fernando Jeno Award; Congress of Jewish Culture Award

Signature
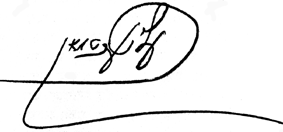

Eli Schechtman (or Shekhtman or Shechtman) (Yiddish: עלי שעכטמאן; September 8, 1908 – January 1, 1996) was a Yiddish writer. He defined the purpose of his work as follows: "My mission in Jewish literature was and still is ... to show to those who negate the power of the Galut, how mighty – spiritually and physically – were the generations who grew up in that Galut, even in the most godforsaken places."

In March 1953, several days before the official announcement of Stalin's death, Eli Schechtman was imprisoned as a Jewish nationalist and charged with espionage and Zionism. He was released several months after Stalin's death due to "lack of evidence of guilt."

Schechtman lived and worked in Israel from 1972 until his death in 1996.

== Biography ==
Eli Schechtman was born in the shtetl of Vas'kovychi, now in Zhytomyr Oblast, in Ukraine. He was the seventh of eight children in his family. He received traditional Jewish education at a cheder. Sсhechtman's mother died when he was eight years old, and his father took care of the children. Eli was forced to leave for Zhytomyr to study in a yeshiva at the age of thirteen.

In 1926, Schechtman went to Odesa – a large intellectual center of Jewish life of that time – where he studied literature at the Odessa Jewish Pedagogical Institute from 1929 to 1932.

=== Marriage ===
In 1929, Schechtman met Sheindl (Zhenia) Magazinnik, an actress in a Jewish theater. They married, moved to Kharkiv in 1932, and later moved to Kyiv in 1936. In 1934, Schechtman joined the Union of Soviet Writers as an active member, where his acceptance was sanctioned by Maxim Gorky, the chairman of the Union. During the 1930s, Schechtman wrote three novels, all of which were published in Yiddish. He also translated the works of Ukrainian novelists to Yiddish.

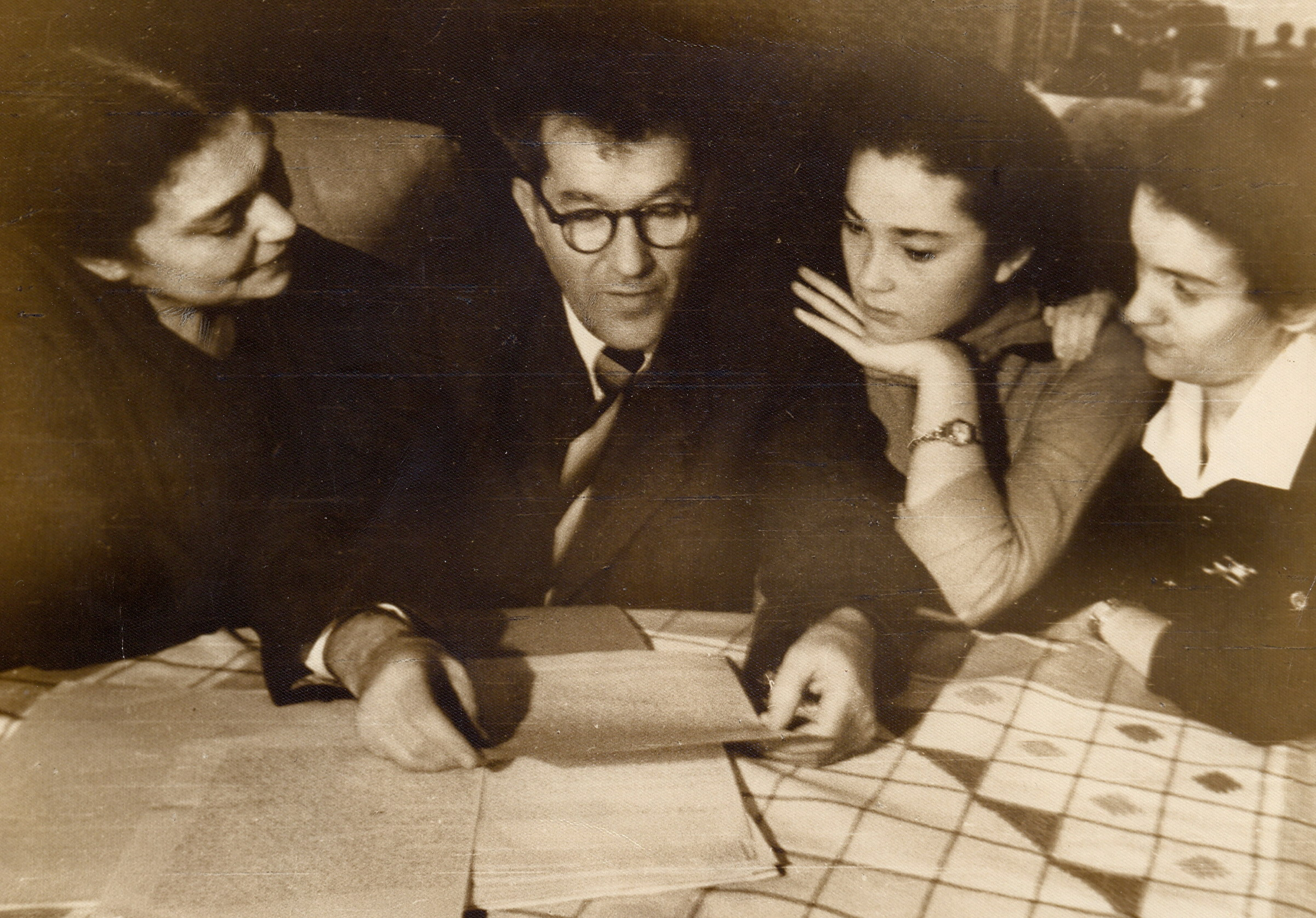
Schechtman family from left to right: Sheindl, Eli, Lara, Lea

.

=== World War II ===
Following the Nazi attack on the USSR and the First Battle of Kiev, Schechtman and his family were evacuated to Uzbekistan. In 1942, Schechtman voluntarily joined the Red Army. He was injured in 1944, but he returned to the front line and fought as an officer until the end of the war. Schechtman was part of the Red Army forces who marched to Berlin in May 1945, and in 1946–1948 he served near Weimar as the Cultural Attaché of the Soviet Forces.

=== Imprisonment ===
In 1948 Schechtman left Germany and returned to the USSR. Between 1948 and 1962, the Schechtman family lived in Kyiv in a communal apartment with 16 neighbours. He couldn't publish his novels, and the family struggled to survive, supported only by Sheindl's modest salary as a kindergarten teacher. In March 1953, several days before the official announcement of Stalin's death, Eli Schechtman was imprisoned as a Jewish nationalist and charged with espionage and Zionism. He was released several months after Stalin's death due to "lack of evidence of guilt."

=== Last years in the Soviet Union ===
Upon his release from the Soviet prison, Schechtman began working on one of his major novels, Erev, despite the fact that at that time in the USSR there was not a single magazine, newspaper, or publishing house for Yiddish literature. This epic novel, the first Yiddish novel in the USSR, written and published after Stalin's death, became the central work of Schechtman's literary career. A number of critics praised it as one of the best achievements of post-Holocaust Yiddish prose.

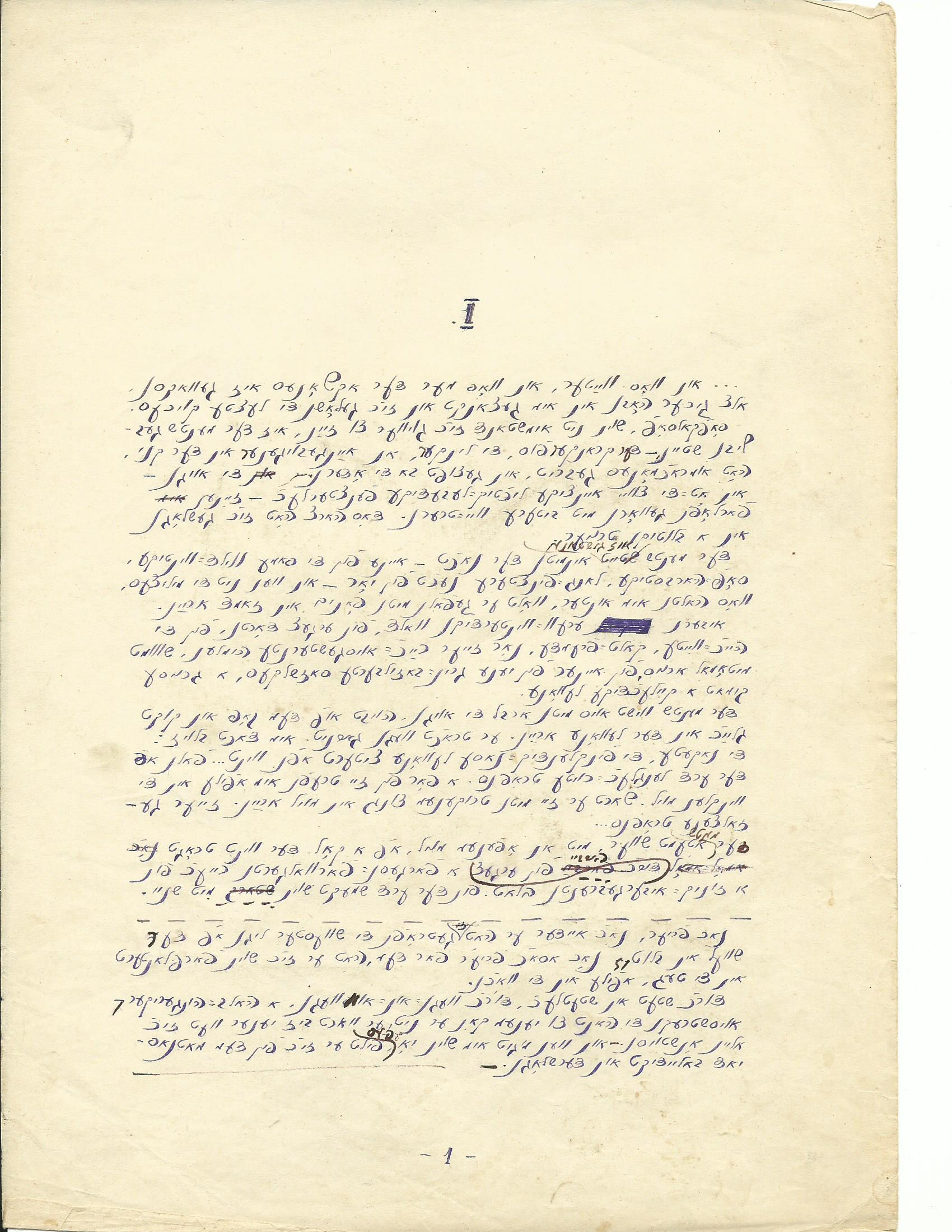
The first page of Erev manuscript

=== Israel ===
In 1972, Schechtman and his wife emigrated to Israel. In 1973, he became the first author to receive an award from the Prime Minister of Israel, Golda Meir, "for literary work in Yiddish." In 1975, a Hebrew translation of the first four parts of Erev was published.

Eli settled in Jerusalem and began to struggle with the attitude toward Yiddish, the language of most Holocaust victims, as a foreign language in the Jewish state. In the 1980s and 1990s, he became even more critical of the historical and cultural approach of the Israeli establishment to the European diaspora and its culture. Although Schechtman was honored by several Israeli literary awards, he was dispirited by the status of the Yiddish language in Israel and generally remained suspended from the circle of local Yiddish writers. In 1991, Eli Schechtman, protesting the situation of Yiddish in Israel, refused to participate in a two-volume Anthology of Yiddish poets and writers (who had ever lived in Israel), whose purpose was to give a complete picture of the Yiddish literature in the country.

Schechtman's literary heritage was eulogized by the writer and literary critic Itche Goldberg in Yidishe Kultur. His full literary heritage is kept in the library of the United States Holocaust Memorial Museum in Washington.

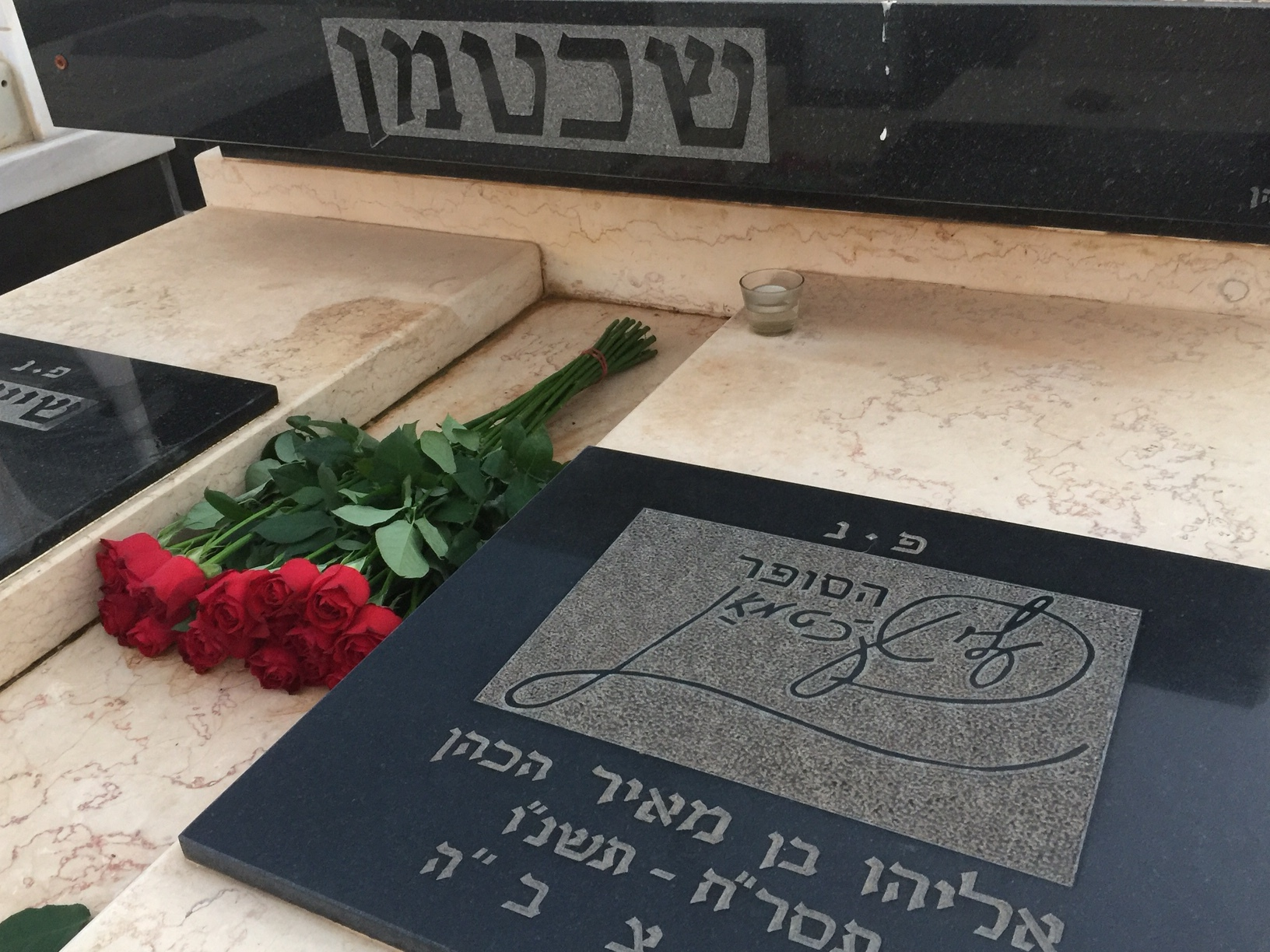
Eli Schechtman's grave

Eli Schechtman died on January 1, 1996, and is buried next to his wife at a cemetery in Kiryat Bialik, Israel.

== Novels ==
Schechtman began writing at the age of twelve. His earliest publication was in 1928: the two poems from the cycle "In shpil fun shneyen" ("In the Play of Snows") were published in Di royte velt (The Red World).

His collection of stories, Oyfn sheydveg (At the Crossroads; 1930), and especially his novel Farakerte mezhes (Plowed Stripes, 1932–1936, reprinted in 1941), established him as a prose writer. A prose stylist, he continued the tradition of such writers as Dovid Bergelson and Der Nister. Most of his literary characters are residents of Polesie, a wooded and marshy land between the Ukraine and Belarus. A collection of his short stories — Polesyer velder (Polesie Forests) — was published in 1940.

Upon his release from the Soviet prison, Schechtman began working on one of his major novels, Erev. This was the first novel published in the new and solely Yiddish magazine Sovetish Heymland, which appeared in the USSR in 1961, more than 20 years after the outbreak of WW2.

The first four books of the novel were serialized in Sovetish Heymland, and the first two books were published in a single volume by the Moscow publishing house Sovetsky Pisatel in 1965. It was translated into French by Rachel Ertel under the name à la vielle de... in 1964 and was translated into English under the original name Erev in 1967, by Joseph Singer. On the cover of this book, Schechtman is compared with Feodor Dostoevsky and Anton Chekhov. In 1975, the first four books of Erev were translated into Hebrew by Zvi Arad and published under the title Beterem.

In 1978, Schechtman suspended work on the novel Erev and began writing the large-scale autobiographical novel Ringen oyf der Neshome (The Rings on the Soul). The first and second books of the novel were published in 1981. The novel was translated into Hebrew and was printed twice: the first book was published in 1981, the second in 1983, and both books together in the Classic series in 1992. The third and fourth books of the novel were published in 1988. Alma Shin translated the entire novel into Russian. The first and second books of the novel were published in 2001 under the title "Rings on the Soul" (in Russian Кольца на душе). In 2023, Shin also translated this novel into Ukrainian under the title "Goirl. Rings on the Soul" (in Ukrainian Ґойрл. Кільця на душі). The third and fourth books were printed in 2012 under the title "Plowing the Abyss" (in Russian Вспахать бездну).

In 1983, Eli Schechtman finished and published his monumental novel Erev, consisting of seven books, which the author called "The Menorah of My Life." The full novel was translated into Russian by Alma Shin and published in Israel in 2005. It was translated into French by Rachel Ertel and published in Paris in 2018. "Eli Chekhtman's novel could accompany the magnificent collection of the photographer Roman Vishniac with the title A Vanished World, which has preserved the memory of these Jewish communities in Eastern Europe, destroyed by the Shoah."

In 1988, Eli Schechtman began working on his last novel Byim shkie aker (The Last Sunset), which was published in 1994. The novel was translated into Russian by Alma Shin in 2008 and into French by Rachel Ertel in 2015. In his article "Le Yiddish d'une guerre à l'autre," Gilles Rozier compares Eli Shekhtman with his contemporaries Vasily Grossman and Varlam Shalamov. Before his death Eli Schechtman completed several short stories (published posthumously) as a collection, entitled Tristia. Several stories from Tristia were translated into Russian by Alma Shin and were published in 2000 under the name Sonatas.

== Awards and honours ==
- 1973, Prime Minister of Israel "for literary work in Yiddish"
- 1976, the Chaim Zhitlowsky Prize
- 1977, the Eliezer Pines Prize
- 1978, Itzik Manger Prize
- 1994, the Fernando Jeno Award for literature in Spanish, Hebrew, and Yiddish
- the Congress of Jewish Culture Award

== Early works ==
- Oyfn Sheydweg (At the Crossroads; 1930)
- Faraḳerṭe Mezshes (Plowed Stripes, 1932)
- Zorani Mezhi (Ukrainian, Faraḳerṭe mezshes; translated by Z. Ioffe, 1937)
- Geḳlibene dertseylungen by Mykhailo Kotsiubynsky (Kiyeṿ: Melukhe-farlag di natsyonale minderhayṭn in USSR, translated by Eli Schechtman, 1940).
- Polesier Welder (Polesye Forests, 1940)

=== Erev (article) ===
- Erev (1965; Erev, part 1 and 2, publishing house Sovetsky Pisatel Moscow)
- á la vielle de... (1964; Erev, part 1 and 2; translated by Rachel Ertel, Paris)
- Erev (1967; English; Erev, part 1 and 2; Joseph Singer , New York)
- Beterem (1975; Erev, parts 1–4; translated by Zvi Arad, Tel-Aviv)
- Erev, (1983; Erev, Books 1–7; published in Israel)
- Эрев (2005; Erev Vol I Books 1–4; Alma Shin; Haifa, ISBN 965-7272-02-3)
- Эрев (2005; Erev Vol II Books 5–7; Alma Shin; Haifa, ISBN 965-7272-02-5)
- Erev – á la vielle de... (2018; Erev; Rachel Ertel; Buchet-Chastel; Paris, ISBN 978-2-283-02859-9).

=== Ringen oyf der neshome (article) ===
- Ringen oyf der neshome (1981; Rings on the Soul, volume [1] was published in Tel-Aviv, Yiśroel-bukh)
- Tabaot beneshama (1983; Rings on the Soul part 1; translated by Yehuda Gur-Arie; Tel-Aviv)
- Tabaot beneshama (1992; Rings on the Soul part 1 and 2; translated by Yehuda Gur-Arie
- Кольца на душе (2001; Rings on the Soul, part 1 and 2; translated by Alma Shin, Haifa, ISBN 965-90212-9-1)
- Ringen oyf der neshome (1988; Rings on the Soul, volume [2] part 3 and 4 was published in Tel-Aviv, Yiśroel-bukh, 1988)
- Вспахать бездну (2012; Rings of the Soul, part 3 and 4; translated by Alma Shin; Haifa ISBN 965-90212-8-3)
- Ґойрл Кільця на душі (2023; Rings on the Soul, part 1 and 2; translated by Alma Shin, Львів, "Апріорі", 2023, ISBN 978-617-629-801-4)

=== Baim Shkie Aker (article) ===
- Baim Shkie Aker (בײַם שקיעה-אַקער) (1994) (The last sunset, Yiddishe Kultur ISBN 1-882963-00-8) portrays the tragic story of a Ukrainian Jewish family destined to experience the atrocities of Stalinism and the Holocaust.
- Последний закат (2008; «Byim shkie aker»; translated by Alma Shin; Haifa ISBN 965-90910-0-1)
- La Charre de feu (2015; «Byim shkie aker»; translated by Rachel Ertel; Buchet-Chastel; Paris, ISBN 978-2-283-033328-9).

=== Tristia (stories) (article) ===
- Tristia (1996; Tristia; Haifa ISBN 965-430-035-4)
- Сонаты (2000; Sonatas; translated by Alma Shin; Haifa, ISBN 965-90212-8-3).

== See also ==
- Antisemitism in the Soviet Union
- Doctors' plot
- History of the Jews in Russia and Soviet Union
- History of the Soviet Union
- Jewish Anti-Fascist Committee
- Stalin and antisemitism
