= Music at Night (book) =

Collection of essays by Aldous Huxley

- First UK edition
- Author: Aldous Huxley
- Language: English
- Genre: Essay collection
- Publisher: Chatto & Windus
- Publication date: 1931

Music at Night is a 1931 collection of essays by Aldous Huxley.

The essays in this book cover different subjects, such as morality in arts ('To the Puritan All Things are Impure', a defence of his friend D. H. Lawrence), music ("After silence that which comes nearest to expressing the inexpressible is music", he writes in 'The Rest is Silence'), similarities in the behaviour of men and cats ('Sermons in Cats').

Part of these essays may be regarded as a description of changes in society at the first half of the 20th century: 'Forehead Villanious Low' deals with the fruits of universal education, while 'Art and the Great Truth' defines modernist literature as "A terror for the obvious in his [the writer's] artistic medium - (...) which leads him to make laborious efforts to destroy the gradually perfected instrument of language".

== Adaptation ==
The book served as the inspiration for the eponymous Music at Night (and Other Stories) jazz album by The New York Second jazz septet.
