= Time Must Have a Stop =

1944 novel by Aldous Huxley

- First UK edition (1945)
- Author: Aldous Huxley
- Language: English
- Genre: Philosophical novel
- Published: 1944 Harper & Brothers (US); 1945 Chatto & Windus (UK)
- Publication place: United Kingdom
- Media type: Print (hardback & paperback)
- Pages: 305 (first edition, hardback)
- OCLC: 576061933
- Preceded by: After Many a Summer
- Followed by: Ape and Essence

Time Must Have a Stop is a novel by Aldous Huxley, first published in 1944 by Chatto & Windus. It follows the story of Sebastian Barnack, a young poet who holidays with his hedonistic uncle in Florence. Many of the philosophical themes discussed in the novel are explored further in Huxley's 1945 work The Perennial Philosophy.

== Title ==
Time Must Have a Stop's title derives from Hotspur's death speech in Shakespeare's Henry IV, Part 1 Act V, Scene 4:

'But thought's the slave of life, and life time's fool; And time, that takes survey of all the world, Must have a stop'

== Plot summary ==
The story initially follows Sebastian Barnack, a seventeen-year-old poet with the beauty of a della Robbia angel, and his desire to procure formal wear for a friend's party despite the wishes of his father John, an anti-fascist lawyer and socialist politician, who believes his son shouldn't live a decadent lifestyle while others suffer. Sebastian, in turn, believes his father's treatment of him comes from his strong physical resemblance to his late mother.

Sebastian's mission takes him to holiday with his rich uncle Eustace, a hedonistic and highly indulgent man who has a great fondness for his young nephew. While staying with his uncle, Sebastian—a virgin—embarks upon a love affair with Veronica Thwale, a widow who closely resembles Mary Esdaile, a character of his own imagination that he tells tales to his friends about. Eustace agrees to buy his nephew formal wear and even bestows a painting by Degas upon him. Sebastian has an intense sexual encounter with Mrs. Thwale, and he feels the holiday has been an unmitigated success. However, before the weight of Eustace's generosity can be felt he dies of a heart attack, leaving Sebastian in a deep panic about the future of his outfit. Sebastian steals the painting to sell to fund his tuxedo but an auditor of the late uncle's estate notes the missing Degas and accusations of theft against innocent employees multiply. Sebastian remains silent, while others are accused and suffer. Finally, he knows he must get the Degas back. Unable to do so himself, he enlists the help of his father's cousin Bruno, a deeply religious bookshop owner.

Meanwhile, the spirit of Eustace, an atheist, lives on and is used as both a narrative tool to allow Huxley to show the fate of characters across time and distance but also adds a hint of comic irony when Eustace's eccentric mother-in-law Mrs. Gamble hosts a seance to talk to her dead son-in-law but the second-rate medium involved garbles his message to Sebastian.

Bruno is able to retrieve the painting but at great cost – calling on friends that inadvertently make himself an enemy of the Italian Fascisti. The Fascist police imprison and mistreat Bruno, and hasten his declining health. Sebastian, driven by his guilt, undertakes the care of his dying uncle and while doing so is altered by the old man's sureness and spirituality. Bruno effects a transformation in Sebastian and, rather than adopting Eustace's hedonism, the young poet seeks a more religious outlook.

In the epilogue, set in the midst of the Second World War, Sebastian, who has lost a hand in combat, begins writing a comparative work of the world's religions, inspired by Bruno, that echoes Huxley's own Perennial Philosophy. His father, while not enamoured by his son's new approach to life, finally shows him respect.

== Themes ==
Focusing on the spiritual health of the characters, Huxley explores many of the themes from his comparative study of mysticism, The Perennial Philosophy. The spuriousness of Mrs. Gamble's spiritualism, the limitations of Eustace's hedonism, and the paradox of Sebastian's weakness as a man and power as a creative artist are all contrasted with Bruno, whose spiritual contentment and non-attachment are presented by Huxley as the highest level of personal development. The book is laden with cultural and philosophical discussions amongst his characters with Huxley himself describing the work as his most successful attempt at "fusing idea with story".

== Characters ==
- Sebastian Barnack - A 17-year-old poet, who bears an uncommon physical beauty and precociousness in verse but has the tiresome manner of a spoiled child.
- Eustace Barnack - Sebastian's uncle, a gluttonous expatriate residing in Florence with a penchant for cigars and brandy.
- John Barnack - Sebastian's father, a staunch anti-fascist campaigner and socialist who raises Sebastian in austere conditions.
- Bruno Rontini - A cousin of John and Eustace, Bruno is a deeply religious bookseller who is seemingly at one with the world.
- Mrs. Gamble - Eustace's mother in law, a blind old woman who regularly partakes in seances to communicate with her deceased friends.
