= Last Sunset (novel) =

1994 novel by Eli Schechtman

The Last Sunset
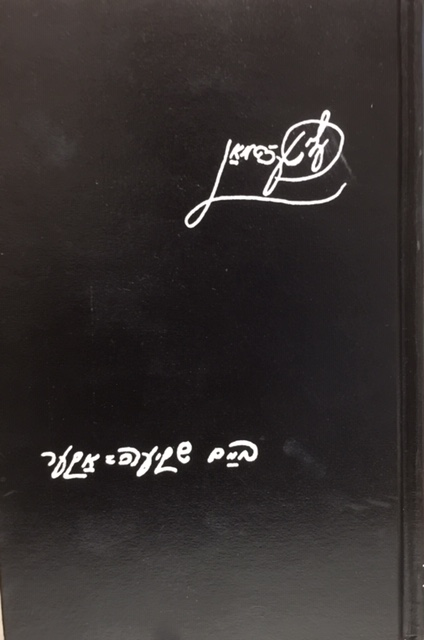
- Author: Eli Schechtman
- Original title: ביים שקיעה=אקער
- Language: Yiddish
- Publisher: NY, Yidishe Kultur
- Publication date: 1994
- Publication place: Israel
- Pages: 392
- ISBN: 1-882963-00-8

Last Sunset (ביים שקיעה=אקער) is an Eli Schechtman novel published by Yidishe Kultur in 1994.

== Overview and publication history ==
In 1988, Eli Schechtman began working on his last novel, Byim shkie aker. Britannica's Literature: Year In Review 1994, stated: “Master wordsmith Eli Shekhtman concluded his epic lamentation for the courage of Polesyier Jews in the novel Baym shkiye-aker”.

The novel was translated into Russian under the name “Последний закат” by Alma Shin in 2008 and translated into French under the name La Charrue de Feu by Rachel Ertel in 2015. Gilles Rozier, in his article "Le yiddish d'une guerre à l'autre", compares Eli Schechtman with his contemporaries Vasily Grossman and Varlam Shalamov.

== Synopsis ==
The Last Sunset is a tragic and heroic epic that covers the catastrophic events for European Jewry of the twentieth century: a century of bloody libel (a vivid example is the Beilis case), villainous pogroms, the extermination by German Nazis and their supporters in most European countries, and almost universally, the indifference of the Christian world. The Russian-Bolshevik attack on Soviet Jews stopped only because of the death of its instigator and curator.

== Critical reception ==
25 years ago, a few weeks before his death, in response to an article about his novel The Last Sunset, Shekhtman responded to criticism: “A writer ... describes the sunset of a Jewish town”: "My mission in Jewish literature was and remains not to reflect the decline of Jewish villages and towns but to show everyone who denies galut (diaspora) what powerful generations, spiritually and physically, grew up in galut, in the most remote places. May God grant that in a Jewish state built on the blood of six million Jews, “galut Jews”, after two hundred years, such Boyars and Makover appear!" (Boyars and Makover were the heroes of the novels Erev and The Last Sunset.)

"This exciting novel, from start to finish, is a tribute to a people. I found there a powerful reflection on the destiny of a people, the way to accept their destiny, or rather to continue to live in spite of their destiny. There is also the question of collective responsibility for such barbarity. The pre-war Eastern European Jewish community is really well described, and through these unforgettable characters, it lives again for a moment. It is one of the great masterpieces that I have been able to read lately; even if this book made me cry at times, I found it to be of great beauty."

== Gallery ==
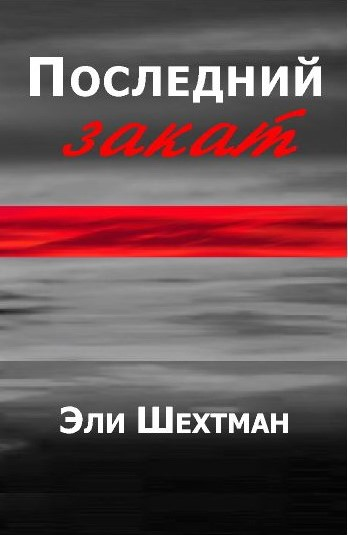
Name: Последний закат
Language: Russian
Translator : Alma Shin
Date: 2008
ISBN 965-90910-0-1

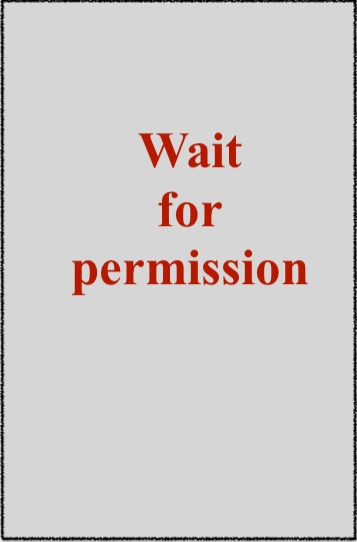
Name: La Charrue de Feu
Language: Franch
Translator : Rachel Ertel
Date: 2015
ISBN 978-2-283-02908-4
