= Crossing the Water =

Poetry collection

First edition (UK)

Crossing the Water is a 1971 posthumous collection of poetry by Sylvia Plath that was prepared for publication by Ted Hughes. These are transitional poems that were written along with the poems that appear in her poetic opus, Ariel. The collection was published in the United Kingdom by Faber & Faber (1975) and in the United States by Harper & Row (1976).

The poems here, mostly written between 1960 and 1961, tend to dwell on one's state of being in an environment. "Wuthering Heights," for example, details a walk that Plath takes along the Yorkshire moors where Emily Brontë once trekked, Finisterre is a stormy island where Plath and her family once visited and "Among the Narcissi" describes Plath's similarities with being among asexual vegetation.

== Contents ==
1. Wuthering Heights
2. Pheasant
3. Crossing the Water
4. Finisterre
5. Face Lift
6. Parliament Hill Fields
7. Insomniac
8. An Appearance
9. Blackberrying
10. I Am Vertical
11. The Babysitters
12. In Plaster
13. Leaving Early
14. Stillborn
15. Private Ground
16. Heavy Woman
17. Widow
18. Magi
19. Candles
20. Event
21. Love Letter
22. Small Hours
23. Sleep in the Mojave Desert
24. The Surgeon at 2 a.m.
25. Two Campers In Cloud Country
26. Mirror
27. A Life
28. On Deck
29. Apprehensions
30. Zoo Keeper's Wife
31. Whitsun
32. The Tour
33. Last Words
34. Among the Narcissi
