= Erev =

Novel

EREV
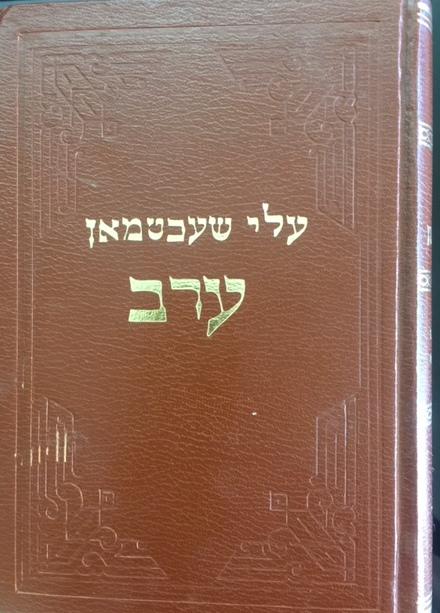
- Author: Eli Schechtman
- Original title: ערב
- Language: Yiddish
- Publisher: Farlag Yisroel-bukh Tel Aviv
- Publication date: 1983
- Publication place: Israel
- Pages: 1222

EREV first edition
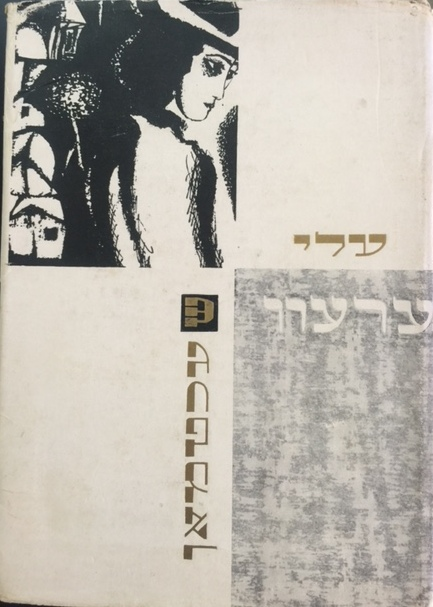
- Author: Eli Schechtman
- Original title: ערעוו
- Language: Yiddish
- Publisher: Sovetski Pisatel
- Publication date: 1965
- Publication place: USSR
- Pages: 236

Erev (Yiddish: ערעוו, lit. 'eve') is a 1983 novel by Eli Schechtman. The first edition of Erev is the beginning of Eli Schechtman's novel written in the Soviet Union and contained four books. The novel was published in the Sovetish Heymland magazine from 1961 to 1968 and in book form in 1965. It describes the life of Russian Jews of the early twentieth century. The "full Erev," which was written and published in Israel in 1983, contains seven books and describes the life of Russian Jews in the early twentieth century until the end of World War II.

== Overview and publication history ==
Erev is central Schechtman's literary work and was the first Yiddish-language novel published in the Soviet Union after the Stalin death. The first four parts of the novel were serialised in Sovetish Heymland from 1961 up to 1968. and only two parts were published in censored form as a book in Moscow in 1965. In 1964 first two books of the novel were translated into French by Rachel Ertel under name À la vielle de.... In 1967 the same two books of novel were translated into English by Joseph Singer under name Erev, where author has been compared in stature to Fyodor Dostoevsky and Anton Chekhov. Four books were translated in Hebrew in Israel in 1975 by Zvi Arad under name Beterem.

Started after Eli Schechtman released from prison in 1953, the full text of Erev novel, consisting of seven books, was completed after thirty years in 1983 and published in Israel. The novel was translated into Russian by Alma Shin and appeared in 2005. A French translation by Rachel Ertel appeared in 2018.

== Plot summary ==
The novel tells the story of a Jewish family in Eastern Europe over four centuries, from its escape from a blood libel in medieval Germany to Russia in the early twentieth century. On the example of the Boyar's family history, author tells us about the fate of Jewish people throughout the 20th century – from the end of the Russo-Japanese War until the end of World War II and the creation of Israel|the state of Israel. The novel paints a rich and intricate gallery of characters facing consistent persecution, while ideology ranges from Tsarist autocracy to Stalinism and Nazism. The Boyar family, although it suffered heavy losses in the brutal upheavals of the era, never stopped fighting for its spiritual and physical survival.

== Critical reception ==
Professor Shlomo Bikel has said: "Erev is one of the most important works that Soviet-Yiddish literature has given us." Gennady Estraikh has described Erev as "one of the most accomplished novels in postwar Yiddish literature". Writing in the Jewish Quarterly in 1978, Elias Schulman argued that "If Soviet Yiddish literature could still produce a novel of the stature and quality of Erev and [Nathan] Zabare's two-part masterpiece [Unter der heyser zun fun Provans and its sequel S'iz nokh groys der tog], we can assuredly assume that Russian Jewry has not yet exhausted its resources, and that Soviet Yiddish culture can yet be revived."\

== Translations of novel Erev ==
Eli Schechtman

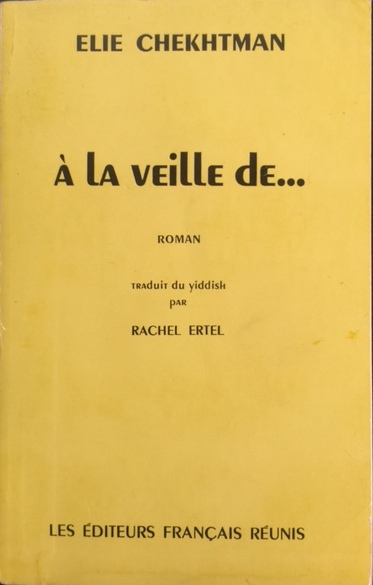
Name: a la vielle de...
Language: French
Translator : R. Ertel
Date: 1964

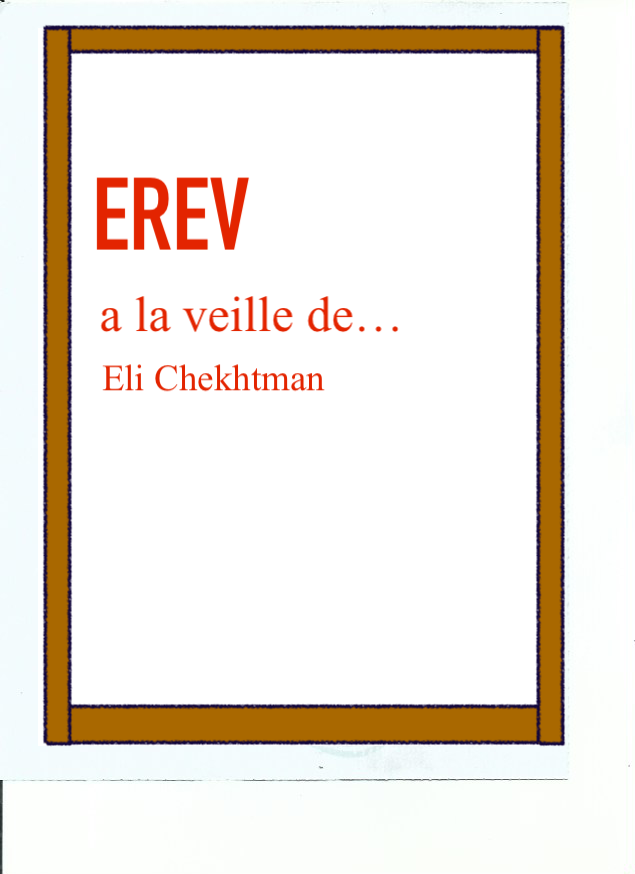
Name: Erev,
a la vielle de...
Language: French
Translator : R. Ertel
Date: 2018
ISBN 978-2-283-02859-9

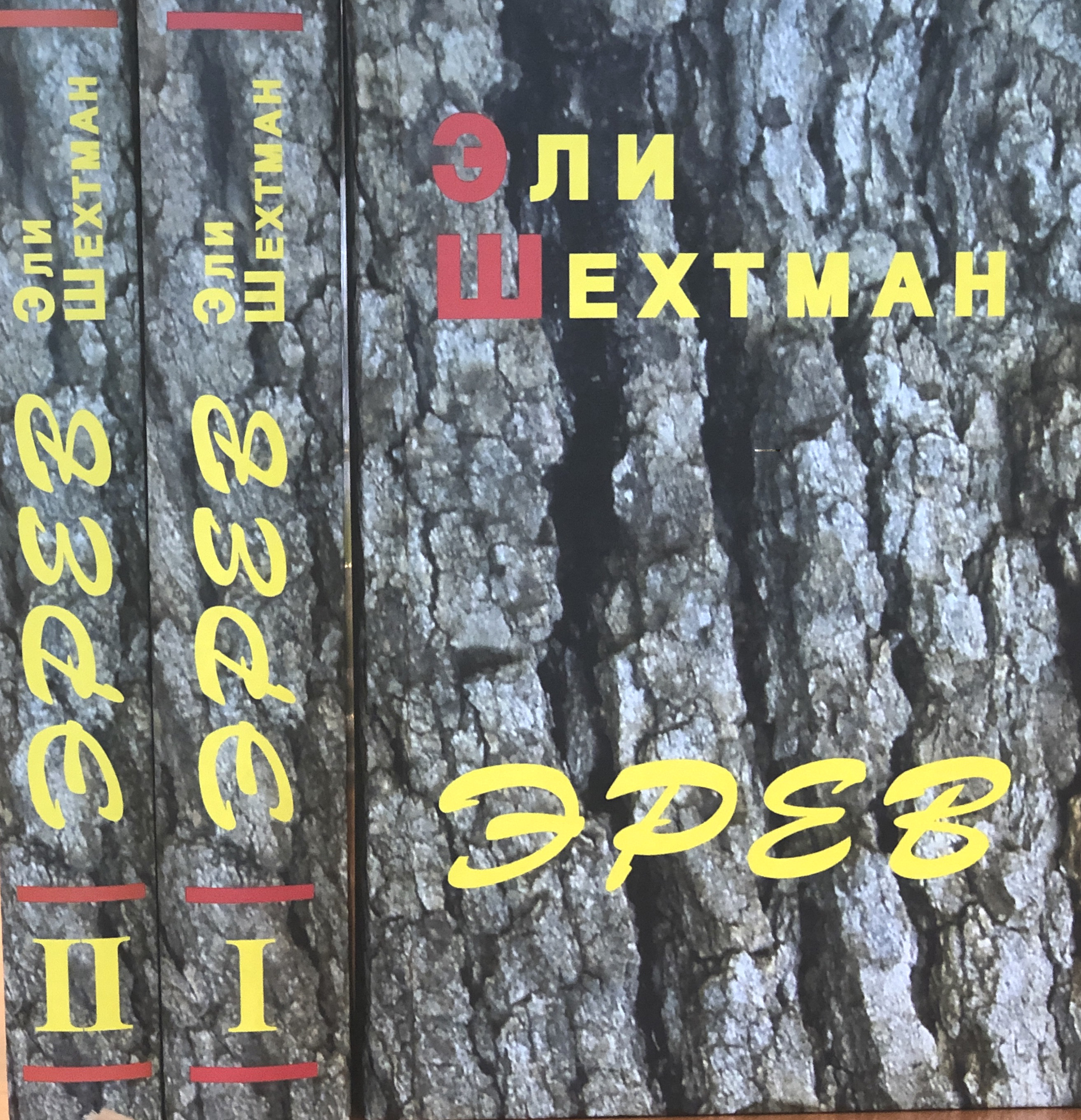
Name: Эрев
Language: Russian
Translator : Alma Shin
Date: 2005
ISBN 965-7272-02-3
ISBN 965-7272-02-5

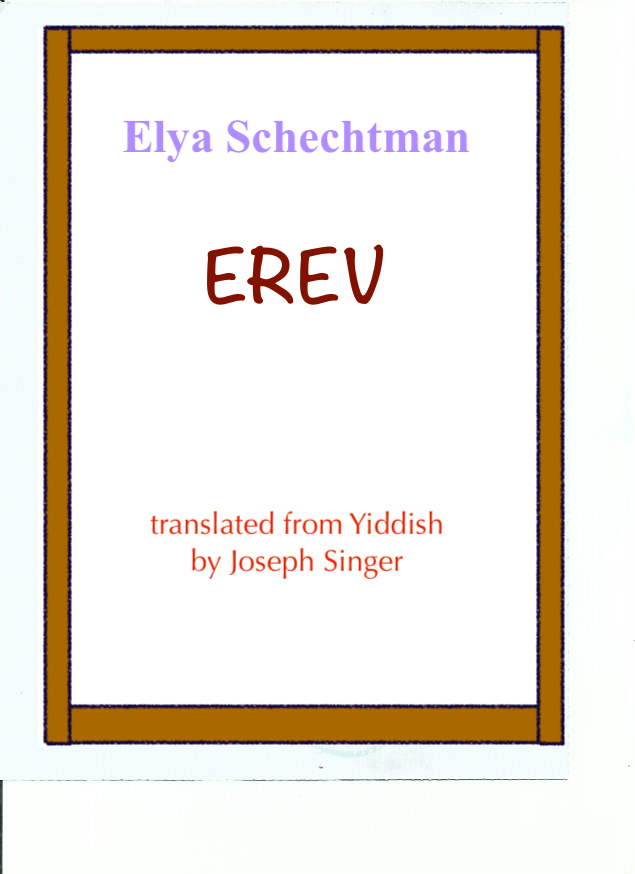
Language: English
Translator : J. Singer
Date: 1967
Congress Catalog :
67-17706

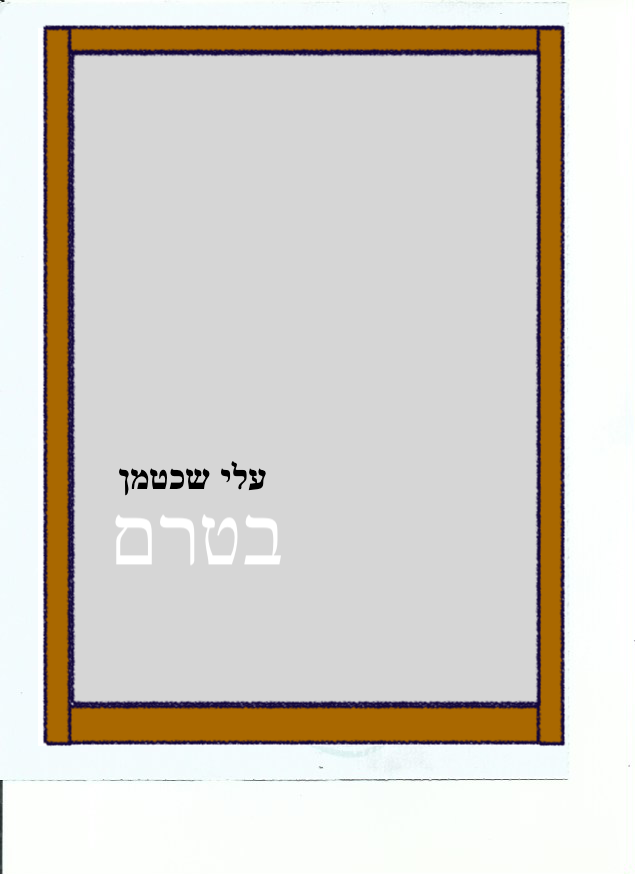
Language: Hebrew
Translator : Zvi Arad
Date: 1975
