= Aldous Huxley bibliography =

List of works by Aldous Huxley

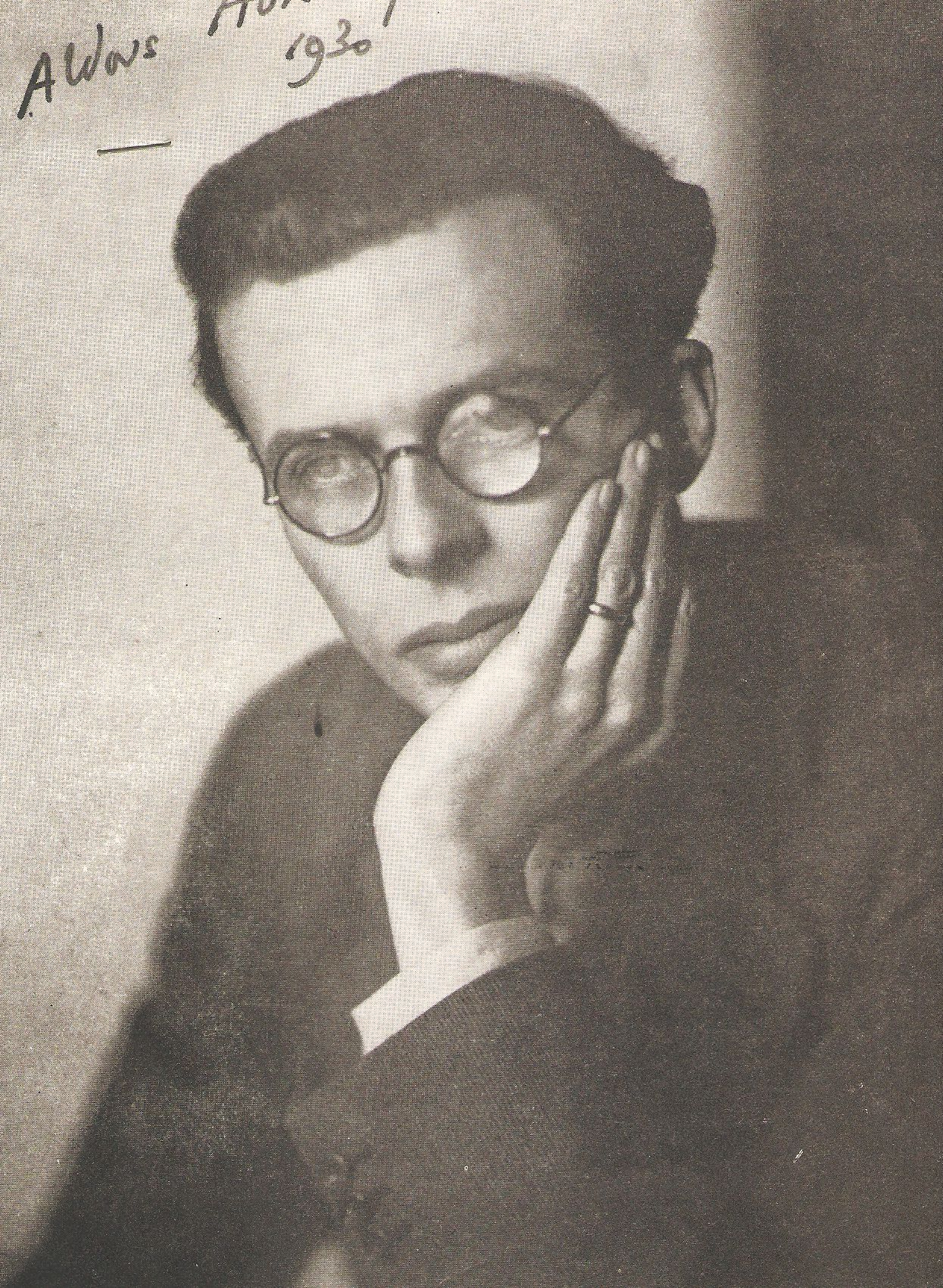
- Books↙: 5
- Novels↙: 15
- Articles↙: 51
- Stories↙: 24
- Collections↙: 30
- Pamphlets↙: 5
- Poems↙: 103
- Plays↙: 8
- Scripts↙: 5
- Letters↙: 1

The following bibliography of Aldous Huxley provides a chronological list of the published works of English writer Aldous Huxley (1894–1963). It includes his fiction and non-fiction, both published during his lifetime and posthumously.

Huxley was a writer and philosopher. He wrote nearly fifty books—both novels and non-fiction works—as well as wide-ranging essays, narratives, and poems. Born into the prominent Huxley family, he graduated from Balliol College, Oxford with an undergraduate degree in English literature. Early in his career, he published short stories and poetry and edited the literary magazine Oxford Poetry, before going on to publish travel writing, satire, and screenplays. He spent the latter part of his life in the United States, living in Los Angeles from 1937 until his death. By the end of his life, Huxley was widely acknowledged as one of the foremost intellectuals of his time. He was nominated for the Nobel Prize in Literature nine times and was elected Companion of Literature by the Royal Society of Literature in 1962.

Huxley was a humanist and pacifist. He grew interested in philosophical mysticism and universalism, addressing these subjects with works such as The Perennial Philosophy (1945)—which illustrates commonalities between Western and Eastern mysticism—and The Doors of Perception (1954)—which interprets his own psychedelic experience with mescaline. In his most famous novel Brave New World (1932) and his final novel Island (1962), he presented his vision of dystopia and utopia, respectively.

== Fiction ==
=== Novels ===
- Crome Yellow (1921)
- Antic Hay (1923)
- Those Barren Leaves (1925)
- Point Counter Point (1928)
- Brave New World (1932)
- Eyeless in Gaza (1936)
- After Many a Summer, or After Many a Summer Dies the Swan (1939)
- Time Must Have a Stop (1944)
- Ape and Essence (1948)
- The Genius and the Goddess (1955)
- Island (1962)

=== Short stories ===
==== Collections ====
- Limbo (1920), collection of 5 short stories, 1 novelette and 1 play:
  "Farcical History of Richard Greenow" (novelette), "Happily Ever After", "Eupompus Gave Splendour to Art by Numbers", "Happy Families" (play), "Cynthia", "The Bookshop", "The Death of Lully"
- Mortal Coils (1921), collection of 3 short stories, 1 novelette and 1 play:
  "The Gioconda Smile" (novelette), "Permutations Among the Nightingales" (play), "The Tillotson Banquet", "Green Tunnels", "Nuns at Luncheon"
- Little Mexican and Other Stories (US title: Young Archimedes) (1924), collection of 4 short stories and 2 novelettes/novellas:
  "Uncle Spencer" (novella), "Little Mexican", "Hubert and Minnie", "Fard", "The Portrait", "Young Archimedes" (novelette)
- Two or Three Graces and Other Stories (1926), collection of 3 short stories and 1 novella:
  "Two or Three Graces" (novella), "Half Holiday", "The Monocle", "Fairy Godmother"
- Brief Candles (1930), collection of 3 short stories and 1 novella:
  "Chawdron", "The Rest Cure", "The Claxtons", "After the Fireworks" (novella)
- Rotunda - A Selection From The Works Of Aldous Huxley (1932), collection of 1 novel, 2 novellas, 4 short stories, 12 poems, 1 play and 12 essays/travel:
  "Those Barren Leaves" (novel)
  "Uncle Spencer", "After The Fireworks" (novellas)
  "Half-Holiday", "The Tillotson Banquet", "Fairy Godmother", "The Dwarfs: From 'Crome Yellow'" (short stories)
  "Leda", "A Sunset", "First Philosopher's Song", "Fifth Philosopher's Song", "Theatre Of Varieties", "The Moor", "Orion", "September", "Storm At Night", "Midsummer Day", "Almeria", "The Cicadas" (poems)
  "The World Of Light" (play)
  "Guide-Books", "The Country", "The Palio At Siena", "Sabbioneta", "Rimini and Alberti", "Popular Music", "Wordsworth In The Tropics", "Fashions In Love", "Holy Face", "Pascal", "From 'Jesting Pilate'", "Meditation On El Greco" (essays and travel)
- After the Fireworks: Three Novellas (1936), collection of 3 novellas earlier published in separate short story volumes:
  "After the Fireworks", "Two or Three Graces", "Uncle Spencer"
- Collected Short Stories (1957) collection of 19 short stories and 2 novelettes earlier published in separate short story volumes and in his novel Crome Yellow:
  From Limbo: "Happily Ever After", "Eupompus Gave Splendour to Art by Numbers", "Cynthia", "The Bookshop", "The Death of Lully"
  From Crome Yellow: "Sir Hercules"
  From Mortal Coils: "The Gioconda Smile" (novelette), "The Tillotson Banquet", "Green Tunnels", "Nuns at Luncheon"
  From Little Mexican and Other Stories: "Little Mexican", "Hubert and Minnie", "Fard", "The Portrait", "Young Archimedes" (novelette)
  From Two or Three Graces and Other Stories: "Half Holiday", "The Monocle", "Fairy Godmother"
  From Brief Candles: "Chawdron", "The Rest Cure", "The Claxtons"
- Consider the Lilies and Other Short Fiction (2010)
  "Ninon and Caligay", "The Death Of Lully", "Sir Kenelm and Venetia Digby", "Good and Old-Fashioned", "Over the Telephone", "Under Compulsion", "Nine A.M.", "Visiting Stranger", "Time's Revenges", "Consider the Lilles", "Voices", "The Nun's Tragedy" (early version of "Nuns at Luncheon")

==== Uncollected short stories ====
- "Jacob's Hands: A Fable" (co-written in 1940s with Christopher Isherwood; discovered 1997)
- "The Crows of Pearblossom" (1944; was published in 1967 by Random House as a children's book illustrated by Barbara Cooney; a picture book version illustrated by Sophie Blackall was published in 2011 by Abrams Books for Young Readers)

=== Plays ===
- The Discovery: A Comedy in Five Acts (1924), written by Frances Sheridan, adapted for the modern stage by Huxley
- The World of Light: A Comedy in Three Acts (1931)
- Mortal Coils (1948), stage version to novelette "The Gioconda Smile"
- The Genius and the Goddess (1958), co-written with Betty Wendel, stage version to novel The Genius and the Goddess
- The Ambassador of Captripedia (1967)
- Now More Than Ever (2000), lost play discovered by the Department of English Literature, University of Münster, Germany

=== Poetry collections ===
- The Burning Wheel (1916), collection of 31 poems:
  "The Burning Wheel", "Doors of the Temple", "Villiers de L'Isle-Adam", "Darkness", "Mole", "The Two Seasons", "Two Realities", "Quotidian Vision", "Vision", "The Mirror", "Variations on a Theme of Laforgue", "Philosophy", "Philoclea in the Forest", "Books and Thoughts", "Contrary to Nature and Aristotle", "Escape", "The Garden", "The Canal", "The Ideal found wanting", "Misplaced Love", "Sonnet", "Sentimental Summer", "The Choice", "The Higher Sensualism", "Sonnet", "Formal Verses", "Perils of the Small Hours", "Complaint", "Return to an Old Home", "Fragment", "The Walk"
- Jonah (1917), collection of 12 poems:
  "Jonah", "Behemoth", "Minoan Porcelain", "Zoo Celeste", "Sonnet a l'Ingenue", "Dix-Huitieme Siecle", "Hommage a Jules Laforgue", "Sententious Song", "The Oxford Volunteers", "The Contemplative Soul", "The Betrothal of Priapus", "Farewell to the Muses"
- The Defeat of Youth, and Other Poems (1918), collection of 36 poems:
  "The Defeat of Youth", "Song of Poplars", "The Reef", "Winter Dream", "The Flowers", "The Elms", "Out of the Window", "Inspiration", "Summer Stillness", "Anniversaries", "Italy", "The Alien", "A Little Memory", "Waking", "By the Fire", "Valedictory", "Love Song", "Private Property", "Revelation", "Minoan Porcelain", "The Decameron", "In Uncertainty to a Lady", "Crapulous Impression", "The Life Theoretic", "Complaint of a Poet Manqué", "Social Amenities", "Topiary", "On the Bus", "Points and Lines", "Panic", "Return from Business", "Stanzas", "Poem", "Scenes of the Mind", "L'Après-Midi D'un Faune", "The Louse-Hunters"
- Leda (1920), collection of 26 poems:
  "Leda", "The Birth of God", "On Hampstead Heath", "Sympathy", "Male and Female Created He Them", "From the Pillar", "Jonah", "Variations on a Theme", "A Melody By Scarlatti", "A Sunset", "Life and Art", "First Philosopher's Song", "Second Philosopher's Song", "Fifth Philosopher's Song", "Ninth Philosopher's Song", "Morning Scene", "Verrey's", "Frascati's", "Fatigue", "The Merry-Go-Round", "Back Streets", "Last Things", "Gothic", "Evening Party", "Beauty", "Soles Occidere et Redire Possunt"
- Selected Poems (1925), collection of 41 poems published in previous collections:
  "Song of Poplars", "The Reef", "The Flowers", "The Elms", "Out of the Window", "Summer Stillness", "Inspiration", "Anniversaries", "Italy", "The Alien", "A Little Memory", "Waking", "By the Fire", "Valedictory", "Private Property", "Revelation", "Minoan Porcelain", "In Uncertainty to a Lady", "Crapulous Impression", "Complaint of a Poet Manqué", "Social Amenities", "Topiary", "On the Bus", "Points and Lines", "Panic", "Stanzas", "Poem", "Scenes of the Mind", "L'Après-Midi d'un Faune", "Mole", "Two Realities", "Quotidian Vision", "The Mirror", "Variations on a Theme of Laforgue", "Philosophy", "Philoclea in the Forest", "Books and Thoughts", "The Higher Sensualism", "Formal Verses", "Perils of the Small Hours", "Return to an Old Home"
- Arabia Infelix and Other Poems (1929), limited edition (692 copies) collection of 17 poems:
  "Arabia Infelix", "Noblest Romans", "Meditation", "September", "Seasons", "Picture of Goya: A Highway Robbery", "Theatre of Varieties", "Caligular, or the Triumph of Beauty", "Nero and Sporus, or the Triumph of Art", "Nero and Sporus, II", "Mythological Incident", "Femmes Damnées", "The Pergola", "Sheep", "Black Country", "Carpe Noctem", "The Cicadas"
- The Cicadas and Other Poems (1931), collection of 30 poems - 16 of which were previously published in the limited edition 'Arabia Infelix and Other Poems' collection:
  "Theatre of Varieties", "A Highway Robbery", "Caligula or the Triumph of Beauty", "Nero and Sporus or the Triumph of Art", "Nero and Sporus", "Mythological Incident", "Femmes Damnées", "Arabia Infelix", "The Moor", "Noblest Romans", "Orion", "Meditation", "September", "Seasons", "Storm at Night", "Mediterranean", "Tide", "Fête Nationale", "Midsummer Day", "Autumn Stillness", "Apennine", "Almeria", "Pagan Year", "Armour", "Sheep", "Black Country", "The Pergola", "Lines", "The Cicadas", "The Yellow Mustard"
- The Collected Poetry of Aldous Huxley (1971), collection of most of the poems contained in The Burning Wheel, The Defeat of Youth, and Other Poems, Leda, and The Cicadas and Other Poems

=== Screenplays ===
- Pride and Prejudice (1940), collaboration with Jane Murfin
- Madame Curie (1943), uncredited, collaboration with Paul Osborn and Hans Rameau
- Jane Eyre (1943), collaboration with John Houseman and Robert Stevenson
- A Woman's Vengeance (1947)
- Original screenplay (rejected) for Disney's animated Alice in Wonderland (1951)

== Non-fiction ==
=== Books ===
- The Devils of Loudun (1952)

=== Articles ===
Written for Vedanta and the West:

- "Distractions" (1941)
- "Distractions II" (1941)
- "Action and Contemplation" (1941)
- "An Appreciation" (1941)
- "The Yellow Mustard" (1941)
- "Lines" (1941)
- "Some Reflections of the Lord's Prayer" (1941)
- "Reflections of the Lord's Prayer" (1942)
- "Reflections of the Lord's Prayer II" (1942)
- "Words and Reality" (1942)
- "Readings in Mysticism" (1942)
- "Man and Reality" (1942)
- "The Magical and the Spiritual" (1942)
- "Religion and Time" (1943)
- "Idolatry" (1943)
- "Religion and Temperament" (1943)
- "A Note on the Bhagavatam" (1943)
- "Seven Meditations" (1943)
- "On a Sentence From Shakespeare" (1944)
- "The Minimum Working Hypothesis" (1944)
- "From a Notebook" (1944)
- "The Philosophy of the Saints" (1944)
- "That Art Thou" (1945)
- "That Art Thou II" (1945)
- "The Nature of the Ground" (1945)

- "The Nature of the Ground II" (1945)
- "God in the World" (1945)
- "Origins and Consequences of Some Contemporary Thought-Patterns" (1946)
- "The Sixth Patriarch" (1946)
- "Some Reflections on Time" (1946)
- "Reflections on Progress" (1947)
- "Further Reflections on Progress" (1947)
- "William Law" (1947)
- "Notes on Zen" (1947)
- "Give Us This Day Our Daily Bread" (1948)
- "A Note on Gandhi" (1948)
- "Art and Religion" (1949)
- "Foreword to an Essay on the Indian Philosophy of Peace" (1950)
- "A Note on Enlightenment" (1952)
- "Substitutes for Liberation" (1952)
- "The Desert" (1954)
- "A Note on Patanjali" (1954)
- "Who Are We?" (1955)
- "Foreword to the Supreme Doctrine" (1956)
- "Knowledge and Understanding" (1956)
- "The 'Inanimate' is Alive" (1957)
- "Symbol and Immediate Experience" (1960)

=== Essays ===
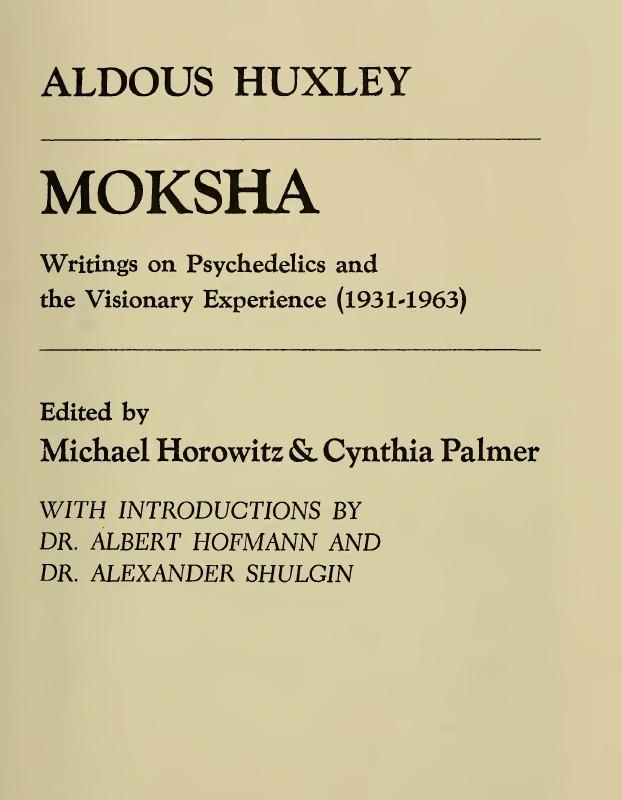
Moksha: Writings on Psychedelics and the Visionary Experience 1931-1963, edited by Michael Horowitz and Cynthia Palmer, with introductions by Albert Hofmann and Alexander Shulgin. New York: Stonehill, 1977

Collections:

- On the Margin: Notes and Essays (1923)
- Essays New and Old (1926)
- Proper Studies: The Proper Study of Mankind Is Man (1927)
- Do What You Will (1929)
- Holy Face and Other Essays (1929)
- Vulgarity in Literature: Digressions from a Theme (1930)
- Music at Night and Other Essays (1931)
- Texts and Pretexts: An Anthology with Commentaries (1932)
- What are you going to do about it? The case for reconstructive Peace (1936)
- The Olive Tree and Other Essays (1936)
- Ends and Means: An Enquiry into the Nature of Ideals and the Methods Employed for their Realization (1937), reissued in 2012 by Transaction Publishers with a new introduction "Pacifism and Non-Attachment" by Howard G. Schneiderman
- Words and their Meanings (1940)
- Grey Eminence: A Study in Religion and Politics (1941)
- The Double Crisis (1949)
- Themes and Variations (1950)
- The Doors of Perception (1954)
- Heaven and Hell (1956)
- Adonis and the Alphabet and Other Essays (US title: Tomorrow and Tomorrow and Tomorrow) (1956)
- Collected Essays (1958)
- Brave New World Revisited (1958)
- On Art and Artists: Literature, Painting, Architecture, Music (1960)
- Literature and Science (1963)
- Moksha: Writings on Psychedelics and the Visionary Experience 1931–1963 (1977)
- The Human Situation: Lectures at Santa Barbara, 1959 (1977)
- Huxley and God: Essays (1991), essays published in the magazine Vedanta and the West between 1941 and 1960

Uncollected essays:

- "Notes on propaganda". Harper's Magazine. December 1936.
  - Extract published as "In the dark". Harper's Magazine. 343 (2056): 33. September 2021.
- The Perennial Philosophy (1945)
- Science, Liberty and Peace (1946)

=== Pamphlets ===
- Pacifism and Philosophy (1935)
- 1936 . . . PEACE? (1936)
- What Are You Going to Do about It?: The Case for Constructive Peace (1936)
- The Most Agreeable Vice (1938)
- The Politics of Ecology: The Question of Survival (1963)

As editor:

- An Encyclopedia of Pacifism (1937)

=== Travel books ===
- Along the Road: Notes and Essays of a Tourist (1925)
- Jesting Pilate, or Jesting Pilate: The Diary of a Journey, or Jesting Pilate: An Intellectual Holiday (1926)
- Beyond the Mexique Bay (1934)

=== Others ===
- Grey Eminence: A Study in Religion and Politics (1941), biography
- The Art of Seeing: An Adventure in Re-education (1942), exploration of the discredited Bates method
- Selected Letters (2007), letters

As illustrator:

- They Still Draw Pictures: A collection of 60 drawings made by Spanish children during the war (1938), author The Spanish Child Welfare Association

== Audio recordings ==
- Knowledge and Understanding (1955), A lecture given at the Hollywood Temple of the Vedanta Society of Southern California
- Who Are We? (1955), A lecture given at the Hollywood Temple of the Vedanta Society of Southern California

== Adaptations ==
- A Woman's Vengeance (1948), film directed by Zoltan Korda, based on novelette "The Gioconda Smile"
- Prelude to Fame (1950), film directed by Fergus McDonell, based on novelette "Young Archimedes"
- The World of Light (1950), TV movie, based on play The World of Light: A Comedy in Three Acts
- Das Lächeln der Gioconda (1953), TV movie directed by Werner Völger, based on play Mortal Coils: Play
- Das Lächeln der Gioconda (1958), TV movie directed by Michael Kehlmann, based on novelette "The Gioconda Smile"
- Das Genie und die Göttin (1959), TV movie directed by Walter Rilla, based on play The Genius and the Goddess
- The Gioconda Smile (1963), TV movie directed by Patrick Barton, based on novelette "The Gioconda Smile"
- Das Lächeln der Gioconda (1966), TV movie directed by Ilo von Jankó, based on novelette "The Gioconda Smile"
- Mona Lisan hymy (1966), TV movie directed by Jukka Sipilä, based on novelette "The Gioconda Smile"
- After Many a Summer (1967), TV movie directed by Douglas Camfield, based on novel After Many a Summer
- Point Counter Point (1968), miniseries directed by Rex Tucker, based on novel Point Counter Point
- Úsmev Mony Lízy (1968), TV movie directed by Bedřich Kramosil, based on novelette "The Gioconda Smile"
- Die Teufel von Loudun (1969), TV movie directed by Rolf Liebermann, based on novel The Devils of Loudun
- Il sorriso della Gioconda (1969), TV movie directed by Enrico Colosimo, based on play Mortal Coils: Play
- Eyeless in Gaza (1971), miniseries directed by James Cellan Jones, based on novel Eyeless in Gaza
- The Devils (1971), film directed by Ken Russell, based on novel The Devils of Loudun
- Effetti speciali (1978), TV movie directed by Gianni Amelio, based on a novel
- Il piccolo Archimede (1979), TV movie directed by Gianni Amelio, based on novelette "Young Archimedes"
- Brave New World (1980), TV movie directed by Burt Brinckerhoff, based on novel Brave New World
- The Holy Family (1994), short film directed by Ulrich Weis, based on short story "The Claxtons"
- Brave New World (1998), TV movie directed by Leslie Libman and Larry Williams, based on novel Brave New World
- Stardust (2002), short film directed by Roque Azcuaga, based on a novel
- Brave New World (2010), miniseries directed by Leonard Menchiari, based on novel Brave New World
- Brave New World (2014), fan film directed by Nathan Hyde, based on novel Brave New World
- The Alien (2017), short film directed by William le Bras and Gabriel Richard, based on poem "The Alien"
- Brave New World (2020), series created by David Wiener, based on novel Brave New World
- Die Teufel von Loudun (2022), film directed by Christoph Engel, based on novel The Devils of Loudun
