= Collected Short Stories (Huxley) =

1957 collection of short stories by Aldous Huxley

- First US edition
- Author: Aldous Huxley
- Language: English
- Genre: Short story collection
- Publisher: Harper & Row (US); Chatto & Windus (UK)
- Publication date: 1957

Collected Short Stories is a collection of short fiction by Aldous Huxley, published in 1957. The book consists of twenty stories compiled from five of Huxley's earlier collections (18 short stories and two novelettes) and one from his novel Crome Yellow. It was published by Harper & Row in the US and Chatto & Windus in the UK.

== Content ==
From Limbo (1920):

- "Happily Ever After"
- "Eupompus Gave Splendour to Art by Numbers"
- "Cynthia"
- "The Bookshop"
- "The Death of Lully"

From Crome Yellow (1921):

- "Sir Hercules"

From Mortal Coils (1922):

- "The Gioconda Smile", novelette
- "The Tillotson Banquet"
- "Green Tunnels"
- "Nuns at Luncheon"

From Little Mexican and Other Stories (1924):

- "Little Mexican"
- "Hubert and Minnie"
- "Fard"
- "The Portrait"
- "Young Archimedes", novelette

From Two or Three Graces and Other Stories (1926):

- "Half Holiday"
- "The Monocle"
- "Fairy Godmother"

From Brief Candles (1930):

- "Chawdron"
- "The Rest Cure"
- "The Claxtons"
