= 1980 in Italian television =

This is a list of Italian television related events from 1980.

== Events ==
=== RAI ===
- 9 February: Toto Cotungno wins the Sanremo Festival, hosted by Caludio Cecchetto and Roberto Benigni, with Solo noi. In the final evening Benigni, on air, good-naturedly mocks Pope John Paul II, calling him “Woytilaccio” (Big bad Woytila). Benigni speaks ironically about Catholic sex morality and asks his partner Olimpia Carrisi to make love on the stage. The performance of the actor is considered controversial and causes a parliamentary question.
- 19 February: the newborn RAI 3 broacasts the Carnival of Venice.
- 12 June. Sergio Zavoli replaces Paolo Grassi as RAI president, while Willy de Luca becomes general director. In September, the directors of all three channel and of the news headlines are also replaced. After the freedom of the “era Grassi”, the government regains control of the estate, despite the undeniable professionality of the new president.
- 18 June. The Italy-Czechoslovakia match in UEFA Euro 1980 gets 24.7 million viewers. It is the second largest audience of the year, after the final evening of Fantastico (25.6 million).
- 19 July: from Moscow, RAI broadcasts the opening ceremony of 1980 Summer Olympics.
- 2 August. Bologna massacre, with 85 dead; RAI covers the event with extraordinary editions of the news. The nation views the shocking images shot by its Bonosia seat. Followed by the airing of the funeral of the victims, where the state authorities are harshly criticized.
- September. Musica insieme is the last RAI show aired in black and white.
- October. RAI 1 and RAI 2 extend the hours of broadcasting. The traditional pause of the afternoon is abolished; in the weekends, the beginning of the programs is set at 10 AM.
- 23 November. Irpinia earthquake. For a week, the RAI programs are almost exclusively dedicated to the huge tragedy, with special editions of the news, touching reportages and appeals to the solidarity. On 26 November, the president Sandro Pertini, speaking from the places of the disaster, denounces the delays and the inefficiencies of the help efforts.

=== Private channels ===
Notwithstanding a series of legal battles brought by RAI to maintain the private channels in the local scope, with sentences of the tribunals often contradictory, the year sees the birth of the two first Italian national networks: the Angelo Rizzoli's Prima Rete Indipendente and the Silvio Berlusconi's Canale 5. At the end of the year, there are 370 channels affiliated to a network, against 266 independent ones.

- March. Birth of Nuova Emittenza Televisiva (NET), network of 18 televisions, managed by the FGCI and directed by Walter Veltroni.
- 30 September. In spite of a warning of the Ministry of Communications, Silvio Berlusconi's Tele Milano 58 begins to broadcast in the whole Northern Italy with the mark Canale 5; almost immediately, the network extends to Center and South, with the mark Canale 10, and by the 1 November covers the whole Italian territory.
- November. The newborn Canale 5 quickly has a sensational win, buying the TV rights for the Mundialito (a tournament featuring previous World Cup winners, played in Uruguay) for $900,000. After long negotiations, RAI and Canale 5 reach an agreement: Canale 5 can use the RAI satellite, while in exchange the State television can broadcast the matches of the Italian team. The Mundialito is the first great public success of Canale 5, with 8 million viewers.
- 13 December. Birth of Angelo Rizzoli's network Prima Rete Indipendente, active in the Northern Italy and in Rome. The news program, Contatto, is trusted to Maurizio Costanzo (as Rizzoli, affiliated to the P2 lodge).

== Debuts ==
=== RAI ===
==== Serials ====
- Il fascino dell’insolito (The charm of the strange) – anthology series of fantastic stories; 3 seasons.

==== Variety ====
- Flash – quiz about the current news, with Mike Bongiorno (who works in RAI for the last time); 2 seasons.
- Fresco fresco (Very fresh) – show for children of the summer; 3 seasons.

==== News and educational ====
- Mixer – magazine of current news and culture, care of Giovanni Minoli, famous for its graphic experimentations and for the “Mixer face to face”, interviews of famous personalities, whose tight close-up fills the background; lasted till 1998.
- Il processo del lunedì (The Monday's trial) – talk show about Italian soccer, care of Aldo Biscardi, the first (and, for long time, the only) public success of RAI 3. For two decades the most popular sport program of the Italian TV, also if often charged to be “trash TV” for its harsh verbal brawl, it goes on till 1997 (with a reprisal from 2013 to 2017) on RAI. A similar show, Il processo di Biscardi, is on air since 1993 on various private channels.

=== Private channels ===
- Buongiorno Italia (Good morning Italia) – show of the morning of Canale 5, repeating the formula of Good morning America and hosted, in turn, by Marco Columbro, Aba Cercato and Fiorella Pietrobon; 6 seasons, with a break-up from 1984 to 1987.
- Popcorn – musical show on Canale 5; 4 seasons.
- I sogni nel cassetto (The dreams in the drawer) – quiz on Canale 5 hosted by Mike Bongiorno, who so begins his long collaboration with the Berlusconi’s televisions.
- Il telegramma (The telegram) – game show on Antenna Nord; 3 seasons.
- Facciamo un affare - game show on TMC, by Walter Chiari; 1 seasons.
- Ottava nota – musical show with Richard Benson, on the Roman channel TVA 40; 22 seasons.

== Television shows ==
=== Drama ===
- Maternale – by Giovanna Gagliardo, with Carla Gravina; the hard relationship between a mother and an anorexic daughter.
- Nella vita di Sylvia Plath (In the life of Sylvia Plath) – biopic by Alessandro Cane, with Carla Gravina.
- Racconto d’autunno (Autumn tale) – by Domenico Campana, with Fernando Rey, from the Tommaso Landolfi's novel; gothic romance with the Italian campaign in the background.
- The little Archimedes by Gianni Amelio, from Aldous Huxley’s Young Archimedes, with John Steiner and Laura Betti; the life of a young peasant is turned upside down when a professor discovers his talent for mathematics.
- Il ritorno di Casanova (Casanova's homecoming) – by Pasquale Festa Campanile, script of Piero Chiara from the Arthur Schnitzler's tale, with Giulio Bosetti; the last, tragic, love affair of the great seducer, by now aged and poor.
- Un reietto delle isole (An outcasts of the islands) – by Giorgio Moser, from the Joseph Conrad’s novel, with Sergio Fantoni and Massimo Girotti.
- Lulù by Mario Missiroli, from the Franz Wedekind’s "Lulu plays", with Stefania Sandrelli and Sergio Fantoni.
- Gradiva – directed and interpreted by Giorgio Albertazzi, from the Wilhelm Jensen’s tale, with Peter Chatel and Laura Antonelli; the film was realized in 1970 but aired only ten years later.

==== Agatha Christie adaptations ====
- L’ospite inatteso (The unexpected guest) – by Daniele D’Anza, with Paolo Bonacelli and Paola Pitagora.
- Verso l’ora zero (Towards zero) – by Stefano Roncoroni, with Giuseppe Pambieri and Alida Valli.
- La tana (The hollow) by Raffaele Meloni, with Sarah Ferrati and Franco Graziosi.
- La tela del ragno (Spider’s web) by Mario Ferrero, with Monica Guerritore and Warner Bentivegna.

=== Miniseries ===
- Un uomo da ridere (A man to laugh) – by Lucio Fulci, with Franco Franchi in the autobiographical and partly dramatic role of a comic actor; 6 episodes.

==== Mystery ====
- Bambole: scene da un delitto perfetto (Dolls, scenes from a perfect crime) – by Alberto Negrin, with Adalberto Maria Merli, in 3 episodes. Noir drama, with an unusual setting (Rome in 1918) and inspired by the true Mesones affair.
- Delitto in piazza (Crime in the place) – by Nanni Fabbri, with Gino La Monica, in 3 episodes. A simple clerk, improvised detective, solves an intricate plot.
- L’enigma delle due sorelle (The two sisters’ enigma) – thriller by Mario Foglietti, with Delia Boccardo and Giampiero Albertini, in 4 episodes. A female fashion photographer is persecuted by the phone calls of her sister (died two years before in a car accident), while around her the murders follow each other.
- Poco a poco (Step by step) – by Alberto Sironi, with Flavio Bucci, Diego Abantantuono and Therese Ann Savoy; from Francis Durbridge's The gentle hook, transferred in Milan, in 3 episode.
- La donna in bianco (The woman in white) by Mario Morini, from the Wilkie Collins’ novel, with Anna Maria Gherardi and Paolo Bonacelli; 4 episodes.
- Ricatto internazionale (International blackmail) by Dante Guastamagna, from Eric Ambler’s The intercom conspiracy, with Renzo Palmer and Marzia Ubaldi.
- Delitto in via Teulada by Aldo Lado – mystery set in the RAI studio, originally broadcast as a five minutes strip.

==== Period dramas ====
- L’eredità della priora (The prioress’ heredity) – by Anton Giulio Majano, with Alida Valli, Giancarlo Prete and Carlo Giuffrè, music by Eugenio Bennato and the Muscanova group, from the Carlo Alianello's novel about the brigandage in the Southern Italy; in 6 episodes. The miniseries causes some uproar, both for its negative view of the Italian Risorgimento and for the full frontal of the actress Antonella Munari.
- Giacinta – by Luigi Calderone, from the Lugi Capuana's novel; in 3 episodes; naturalistic drama about a young woman, marked forever by a rape suffered in her childish.
- Arabella by Salvatore Nocita, from the Emilio De Marchi’s novel, with Maddalena Crippa and Tino Carraro, 5 episodes. Melodrama set in late Nineteenth-century Milan, facing a cynical businessman with his daughter-in-law, pure and virtuous.
- Molière by Ariane Mnouchkine (coproduction).
- Christ stopped at Eboli – by Francesco Rosi, with Gian Maria Volonté, Paolo Bonacelli, Lea Massari, from the Carlo Levi's memoir, in 4 episodes. Already distributed in the cinemas in a shortened version, it's integrally aired few weeks after that an earthquake has devastated the Basilicata, place of the story.
- Tre operai (Three workers) – by Francesco Maselli, from the Carlo Bernari's novel, in 4 episodes; the hard lives, the trade union struggles and the love affairs of three young socialist militants (two boy and a girl) on the eve of the fascism's advent.
- Il treno per Istambul (Stamboul train) – by Gianfranco Mingozzi, from the Graham Greene's novel; in 4 episodes.
- Quaderno proibito (The forbidden cahier) – by Marco Leto, with Lea Massari, from the feminist novel by Alba De Cespedes; in 4 episodes.

=== Serial ===
- Fermate il colpevole (Stop the guilty) – mystery inserted in the show Scacco matto (see below) as a quiz (the contenders have to guess the solution). The 23 episodes have the same actors and the same location (a villa on the Como Lake), while characters and historical setting change every time.
- Chiamata urbana urgente per il numero... (Urgent call for number...) – similar mix of mystery and quiz, inserted in Domenica in, with Nando Gazzolo and Erica Bonaccorti.
- Pronto emergenza (Hallo emergence) – by Marcello Baldi; adventure serial about an air rescue team, realized in collaboration with the Italian Armed Forces.
- Orient-Express by Daniele D'Anza, Marcel Moussy, and Bruno Gantillon, with Stephane Audran, Jill Bennett and Carla Gravina; international coproduction in 6 episodes. Remake of the 1953 American series.
- Nemici per la pelle - first Italian sit-com, with Renato Rascel and his real life wife Giuditta Saltarini playing a marrie couple.
- Le incredibili indagini dell’Ispettore Nasy (Inspector Nasy’s unblievable enquiries) and I fantastici viaggi di Ty e Uan (Ty and Uan’s fantastic travels) – cartoon series by the Pagot brothers, respectively comic mystery and fantasy.
- Ora zero e dintorni (Hour zero and surroundings) – sci-fi serial, set after a nuclear war, directed by Andrea Ferreri and Lucio Gaudino, aired on the Roman television Quintarete; in 13 episodes, each 14 minutes long. To be remembered as the first Italian fiction produced by a private editor.

=== Variety ===
- A tutto gag (At full gag) – cabaret in six episodes, by Romolo Siena, with Sydney Rome and novice comic actors as Simona Marchini and Maurizio Micheli.
- L’altra campana (The other bell) – show of infotainment, hosted by Enzo Tortora.
- Il barattolo (The jar) – show for children, with the debuting Fabrizio Frizzi and Roberta Manfredi (daughter of Nino).
- Black out – variety with Stefano Satta Flores and Leo Gullotta
- C’era due volte (Twice upon a time) – directed by Enzo Trapani, hosted by Daniele Piombi and Ilona Staller, with Peter Tosh as constant guest; sexy show, focused on the parody of the traditional fairy tales.
- Crazy bus – variety with Milly Carlucci and, later, Daniela Goggi; remembered for having hosted the last Rino Gaetano's performance, two days before the sudden death of the singer.
- Drim – variety, directed by Gianni Boncompagni, with Ciccio e Franco.
- Giochiamo al varietà (Let's play the variety) – show by Antonello Falqui in 4 episodes, each dedicated to one of the four great schools of the Italian cabaret (Rome, Naples, the Sicily and Milan); with one of the most stellar cast in the story of RAI, from Gigi Proietti and Enrico Montesano to Massimo Troisi, from Lando Buzzanca to Gino Bramieri. It is the greatest public success of the year, with 20 million viewers.
- Ma ce l’avete un cuore? (Have you a heart?) – variety with Gianfranco D’Angelo.
- Palcoscenico – with Milva and Oreste Lionello.
- Saltimbanchi si muore (Tumblers are dead) – variety by Enzo Jannacci, with Gianrico Tedeschi and Massimo Boldi; the surreal misadventures of a troupe of mummers, victims of a fake talent scout.
- Scacco matto (Chek-mate) – autumnal show, bound to the Lotteria Italia, hosted by Pippo Franco and Claudio Cecchetto; it gets poor public approval, also because its airing coincides with the Irpina earthquake, and the following years it's substituted by a new edition of Fantastico.
- Sette e mezzo – quiz hosted by Raimondo Vianello and, later, by Claudio Lippi; it's the first Italian game show aired in the late afternoon, before the news (the time slot was, till then, reserved to the telefilms).
- Studio 80 – variety, by Antonello Falqui, hosted by Christian De Sica.
- Superstar – music show, directed by Gianni Boncompagni, with the New Trolls.
- Tutti insieme compatibilmente (All together compatibly) – variety of the Sunday afternoon, hosted by Nanni Loy.

=== News and educational ===
- Versilia: gente del marmo e del mare (Versilia: people of the marble and the sea) – documentary by Ansano Giannarelli.
- Nel cosmo alla ricerca della vita (In the cosmos, looking for life) – program of popular science by Piero Angela, about the possible existence of the extraterrestrial life.
- Viaggio sentimentale nell’Italia dei vini (Sentimental journey in the wines’ Italy) – reportage by Luigi Veronelli; 4 episodes.
- Il gioco del teatro (The game of theatre) – by Carlo Tuzii, with Vittorio Gassmann and his disciples of the “Theatre store” in Florence.
- Giugno 1940 l’italia entra in guerra (June 1940, Italy goes to wa); for three days, Rai 3 dedicates its entire schedule to the fortieth anniversary of Italy's entry into the World War.
- Ma che storia è questa? (But what story is this?) – historical magazine by Enzo Biagi, based on the History of Italy in comics of the same.
- Quando Coppi correva in bicicletta (When Fausto Coppi raced on a bicycle) – celebratory program, care of Goffredo Fofi, for the twentieth anniversary of the great cyclist’s death.
- Il giro del mondo in 80 tv (Around the world in eighty televisions) – care of Carlo Sartori.
- Uomini e idee del 900 (Men and ideas of the Twentieth century) – care of Emidio Greco.
- L’usignuolo dell’imperatore (The empereor’s nightingale) by Pino Passalacqua and Vittorio Neviano; enquiry about the relations between Italian intellectuals and politics in the recent history.

== Ending this year ==
- Il dirigibile
- Saperne di più
- Odeon
- Un peu d'amour, d'amitié et beaucoup de musique

== Deaths ==
- 27 January: Peppino De Filippo, 76, comic actor.
- 1 February: Romolo Valli, 54, stage actor and, occasionally, TV host.
- 26 March: Erminio Macario, 77, comic actor.
- 13 May: Bice Valori, 52, comic actress.
- 14 August: Diego Fabbri, 69, playwright and screenwriter of several RAI fictions.
- 30 August: Franco Enriquez, 52, director.
- 20 October: Tino Buazzelli, 58, actor, in TV interpreter of Nero Wolfe.
