= David di Donatello for Best Editing =

Annual Italian film award

The David di Donatello for Best Editing (Italian: David di Donatello per il miglior montatore) is a film award presented annually by the Accademia del Cinema Italiano (ACI, Academy of Italian Cinema) to recognize outstanding efforts on the part of film editors who have worked within the Italian film industry during the year preceding the ceremony. It was first presented during the 1981 edition of the David di Donatello award show.

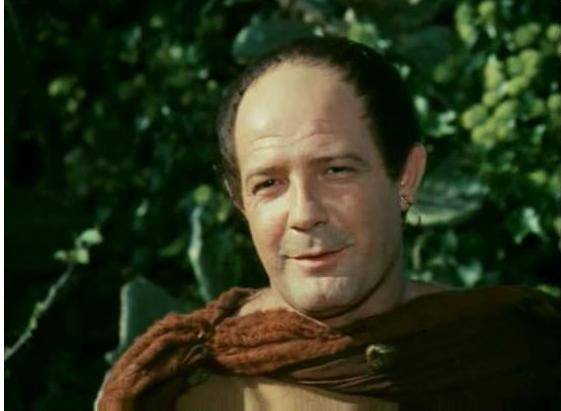
Ruggero Mastroianni was the first to win the prize, and with five wins, is the record holder in this category.

== Winners and nominees ==
Winners are indicated in bold.

=== 1980s ===
1981

- **Ruggero Mastroianni** – Camera d'albergo
- Nino Baragli – Bianco, rosso e Verdone
- Enzo Meniconi – La baraonda

1982

- **Ruggero Mastroianni** – Tales of Ordinary Madness
- Franco Letti – The Opportunities of Rosa
- Roberto Perpignani – Sweet Dreams

1983

- **Roberto Perpignani** – The Night of the Shooting Stars
- Raimondo Crociani – Il mondo nuovo
- Ruggero Mastroianni – All My Friends Part 2

1984

- **Raimondo Crociani** – Le Bal
- Franco Fraticelli – Where's Picone?
- Ruggero Mastroianni – And the Ship Sails On

1985

- **Ruggero Mastroianni** – Carmen
- Roberto Perpignani – Kaos
- Nino Baragli – Secrets Secrets

1986

- **Ruggero Mastroianni** – Let's Hope It's a Girl
- Nino Baragli, Ugo De Rossi, and Ruggero Mastroianni – Ginger and Fred
- Luigi Zita – Camorra

1987

- **Francesco Malvestito** – The Family
- Amedeo Salfa – Christmas Present
- Jane Seitz – The Name of the Rose

1988

- **Gabriella Cristiani** – The Last Emperor
- Nino Baragli – Intervista
- Enzo Meniconi – Dark Eyes

1989

- **Ermanno Olmi** – The Legend of the Holy Drinker
- Gabriella Cristiani – Francesco
- Nino Baragli – The Little Devil

=== 1990s ===
1990

- **Nino Baragli** – The Voice of the Moon
- Simona Paggi – Open Doors
- Amedeo Salfa – The Story of Boys & Girls
- Nino Baragli – On Tour
- Ruggero Mastroianni – The Palermo Connection

1991

- **Nino Baragli** – Mediterraneo
- Mirco Garrone – The Yes Man
- Angelo Nicolini – The Station
- Franco Fraticelli – Boys on the Outside
- Carla Simoncelli – Ultrà

1992

- **Antonio Siciliano** – Damned the Day I Met You (ex aequo)
- **Simona Paggi** – The Stolen Children (ex aequo)
- Claudio Di Mauro – The Invisible Wall

1993

- **Carla Simoncelli** – The Escort
- Nino Baragli – Jonah Who Lived in the Whale
- Jacopo Quadri – Death of a Neapolitan Mathematician

1994

- **Carlo Valerio** – Father and Son
- Nino Baragli – For Love, Only for Love
- Marco Garrone – Caro diario

1995

- **Roberto Perpignani** – Il Postino: The Postman
- Ruggero Mastroianni – Sostiene Pereira
- Simona Paggi – Lamerica
- Jacopo Quadri – Nasty Love

1996

- **Cecilia Zanuso** – Who Killed Pasolini?
- Ugo De Rossi – Palermo – Milan One Way
- Massimo Quaglia – The Star Maker
- Pietro Scalia – Stealing Beauty
- Carla Simoncelli – Strangled Lives

1997

- **Ruggero Mastroianni** and **Bruno Sarandrea** – The Truce
- Francesca Calvelli – The Prince of Homburg
- Massimo Fiocchi – Nirvana
- Mirco Garrone – The Cyclone
- Roberto Perpignani – Marianna Ucrìa

1998

- **Jacopo Quadri** – Rehearsals for War
- Simona Paggi – Life Is Beautiful
- Jacopo Quadri – Ovosodo

1999

- **Esmeralda Calabria** – Not of this World
- Massimo Paglia – The Legend of 1900
- Cecilia Zanuso – Marriages

=== 2000s ===
2000

- **Carla Simoncelli** – Canone inverso
- Jacopo Quadri – Olympic Garage
- Cecilia Zanuso – Ormai è fatta

2001

- **Claudio Di Mauro** – The Last Kiss
- Esmeralda Calabria – The Son's Room
- Roberto Missiroli – One Hundred Steps

2002

- **Paolo Cottignola** – The Profession of Arms
- Carlotta Cristiani – Burning in the Wind
- Massimo Fiocchi – Amnèsia

2003

- **Cecilia Zanuso** – El Alamein: The Line of Fire
- Claudio Di Mauro – Remember Me, My Love
- Patrizio Marone – Facing Windows
- Amedeo Salfa – Incantato
- Marco Spoletini – The Embalmer

2004

- **Roberto Missiroli** – The Best of Youth
- Francesca Calvelli – Good Morning, Night
- Claudio Di Mauro – What Will Happen to Us
- Patrizio Marone – Don't Move
- Jacopo Quadri – The Dreamers

2005

- **Claudio Cutry** – A Children's Story
- Claudio Cormio – After Midnight
- Claudio Di Mauro – Manual of Love
- Giogiò Franchini – The Consequences of Love
- Patrizio Marone – Sacred Heart
- Simona Paggi – The Keys to the House

2006

- **Esmeralda Calabria** – Romanzo Criminale
- Osvaldo Bargero – The Fever
- Claudio Di Mauro – My Best Enemy
- Luciana Pandolfelli – Notte prima degli esami
- Cecilia Zanuso – The Beast in the Heart

2007

- **Mirco Garrone** – My Brother Is an Only Child
- Francesca Calvelli – The Wedding Director
- Maryline Monthieux – Nuovomondo
- Massimo Quaglia – The Unknown Woman
- Patrizio Marone – Saturn in Opposition

2008

- **Giogiò Franchini** – The Girl by the Lake
- Paolo Cottignola – The Right Distance
- Carlotta Cristiani – Days and Clouds
- Eduardo Crespo and Giorgio Diritti – The Wind Blows Round
- Angelo Nicolini – Quiet Chaos

2009

- **Marco Spoletini** – Gomorrah
- Esmeralda Calabria – Giulia Doesn't Date at Night
- Luciana Pandolfelli – Many Kisses Later
- Cristiano Travaglioli – Il divo
- Cecilia Zanuso – We Can Do That

=== 2010s ===
2010

- **Francesca Calvelli** – Vincere
- Massimo Quaglia – Baarìa
- Giorgio Diritti and Paolo Marzoni – The Man Who Will Come
- Simone Manetti – The First Beautiful Thing
- Patrizio Marone – Loose Cannons

2011

- **Alessio Doglione** – 20 Cigarettes
- Mirco Garrone – La nostra vita
- Jacopo Quadri – Noi credevamo
- Francesca Calvelli – Sorelle Mai
- Consuelo Catucci – Angel of Evil

2012

- **Roberto Perpignani** – Caesar Must Die
- Patrizio Marone – ACAB – All Cops Are Bastards
- Esmeralda Calabria – We Have a Pope
- Francesca Calvelli – Piazza Fontana: The Italian Conspiracy
- Cristiano Travaglioli – This Must Be the Place

2013

- **Benni Atria** – Diaz – Don't Clean Up This Blood
- Clelio Benevento – Long Live Freedom
- Walter Fasano – A Five Star Life
- Massimo Quaglia – The Best Offer
- Marco Spoletini – Reality

2014

- **Cecilia Zanuso** – Human Capital
- Giogiò Franchini – Miele
- Patrizio Marone – Fasten Your Seatbelts
- Cristiano Travaglioli – The Great Beauty
- Gianni Vezzosi – I Can Quit Whenever I Want

2015

- **Cristiano Travaglioli** – Black Souls
- Francesca Calvelli – Hungry Hearts
- Jacopo Quadri – Leopardi
- Massimo Fiocchi and Chiara Griziotti – Italy in a Day
- Clelio Benevento – Mia Madre

2016

- **Andrea Maguolo** with the collaboration of Federico Conforti – They Call Me Jeeg
- Jacopo Quadri – Fire at Sea
- Consuelo Catucci – Perfect Strangers
- Patrizio Marone – Suburra
- Cristiano Travaglioli – Youth

2017

- **Gianni Vezzosi** – Italian Race
- Consuelo Catucci – 7 Minutes
- Chiara Griziotti – Indivisible
- Cecilia Zanuso – Like Crazy
- Alessio Doglione – La stoffa dei sogni

2018

- **Affonso Gonçalves** – A Ciambra
- Federico Maria Maneschi – Love and Bullets
- Massimo Quaglia – The Girl in the Fog
- Stefano Cravero – Nico, 1988
- Consuelo Catucci – The Place

2019

- **Marco Spoletini** – Dogman
- Jacopo Quadri and Natalie Cristiani – Capri-Revolution
- Walter Fasano – Call Me by Your Name
- Giogiò Franchini – Euphoria
- Chiara Vullo – On My Skin

=== 2020s ===
2020

- **Francesca Calvelli** – The Traitor
- Granni Vezzosi – The First King: Birth of an Empire
- Jacopo Quadri – The Mayor of Rione Sanità
- Aline Hervé and Fabrizio Federico – Martin Eden
- Marco Spoletini – Pinocchio

2021

- **Esmeralda Calabria** – Bad Tales
- Giogiò Franchini – Figli
- Simona Paggi – Hammamet
- Gianni Vezzosi – Rose Island
- Paolo Cottignola and Giorgio Diritti – Hidden Away

2022

- **Massimo Quaglia** and **Annalisa Schillaci** – Ennio
- Affonso Gonçalves – A Chiara
- Carlotta Cristiani – The Inner Cage
- Cristiano Travaglioli – The Hand of God
- Jacopo Quadri – The King of Laughter

2023

- **Francesca Calvelli** and **Claudio Misantoni** – Exterior Night
- Nico Leunen – The Eight Mountains
- Simona Paggi – Lord of the Ants
- Jacopo Quadri – Nostalgia
- Esmeralda Calabria – Strangeness
