= After the Fireworks: Three Novellas =

1936 collection of novellas by Aldous Huxley

After the Fireworks: Three Novellas is a collection of novellas written by Aldous Huxley, published in 1936. The novellas was earlier published in separate short story volumes:

== Content ==
- "After the Fireworks" (1930), originally published as part of Brief Candles
- "Two or Three Graces" (1926), originally published as part of Two or Three Graces and Other Stories
- "Uncle Spencer" (1924), originally published as part of Little Mexican and Other Stories
