= Éminence grise =

Powerful decision-maker or advisor "behind the scenes"

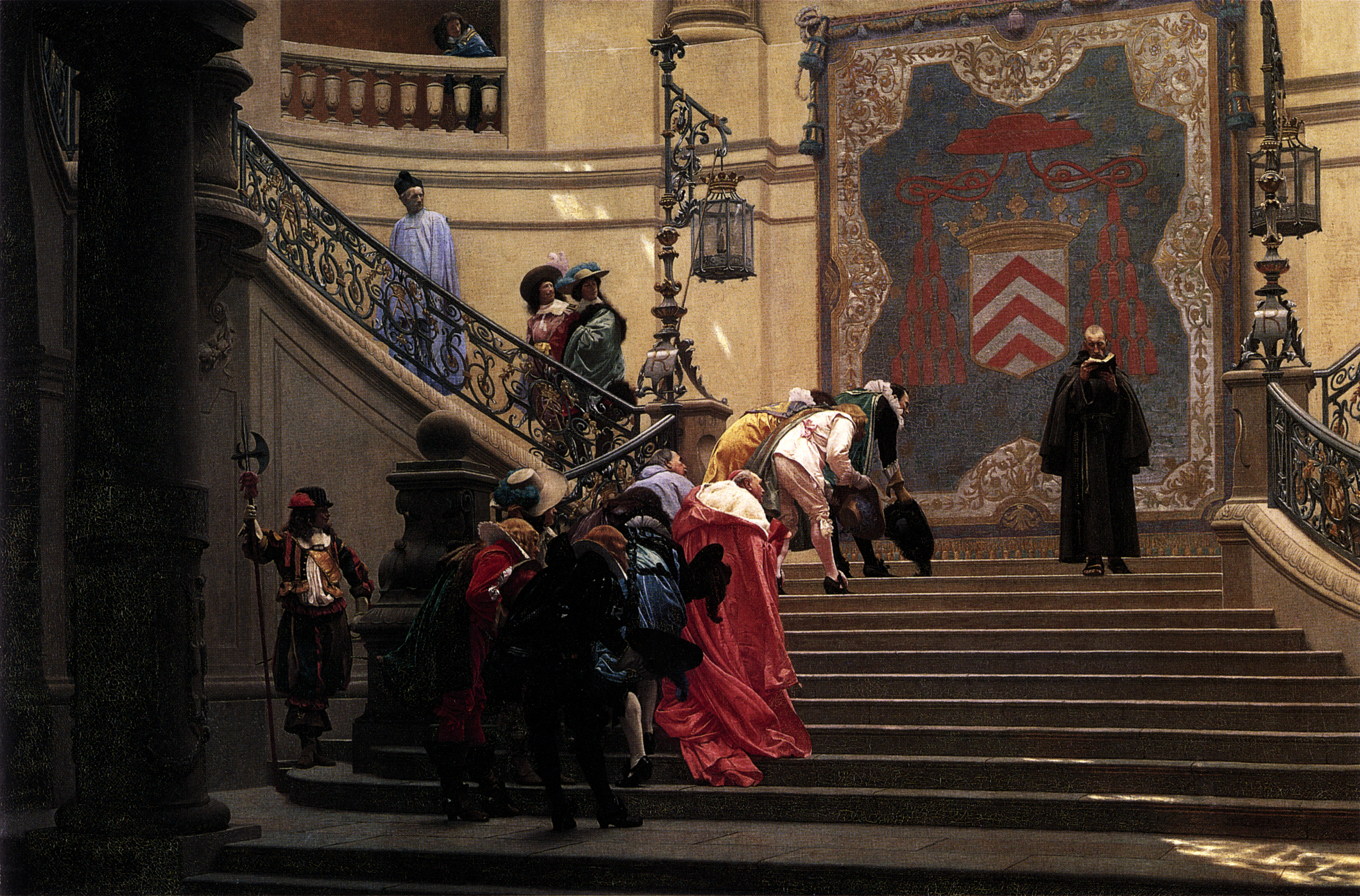
François Leclerc du Tremblay (right, in black robes) descending the staircase of the French Palais-Cardinal. Éminence Grise by Jean-Léon Gérôme (1873)

An éminence grise (French pronunciation: [eminɑ̃s ɡʁiz]) or gray eminence is a powerful decision-maker or advisor who operates covertly in a non-public or unofficial capacity.

Originally, the French expression referred to François Leclerc du Tremblay (Père Joseph), the right-hand man of Cardinal Richelieu, the de facto ruler of France. Leclerc was a member of the Order of Friars Minor Capuchin and wore the gray-colored robe of that Franciscan order, which led them to use the familiar nickname the "Grayfriars" in the names of many Franciscan friaries throughout Medieval Europe. (Note: There are different Franciscan orders and in modern times they are more often associated with a distinctive brown color following changes initiated in the 19th century. A Franciscan website explains: "The Friars Minor Conventual up to the constitutions of 1803 were bound to wear ashen gray, but in 1823 black began to prevail. The Friars Minor Observant underwent the official move from gray to brown habits at the 1895 Assisi Chapter when [Pope] Leo XIII gathered the various families of the Observance into the "Friars Minor" (Reformed, Alcantarins, Recollects, etc.). The Friars Minor Capuchin, in 1912, decided on their present chestnut color.") The color was less significant than its unmistakable contrast with the brilliant red worn by Richelieu as cardinal. The style "Your Eminence" or "His Eminence" is used to address or refer to a cardinal in the Catholic Church. Although Leclerc was never raised to the rank of cardinal, those around him addressed him as "eminence" as if he were one in deference to his close association with "His Eminence the Cardinal Richelieu".

Leclerc is referred to in several popular works such as a biography by Aldous Huxley. An 1873 painting by Jean-Léon Gérôme, L'Éminence grise, depicts him descending the grand staircase of the Palais-Royal–originally called the Palais-Cardinal when it was built for Richelieu in the 1630s–engrossed in reading a book as an array of courtiers bow deeply towards him. The painting won the Medal of Honor at the 1874 Paris Salon. Leclerc is referred to in Alexandre Dumas' The Three Musketeers as the character Father Joseph, a powerful associate of Richelieu and one to be feared.

Anthony Marturano contrasts how different cultures value the behind-the-scenes approach of quiet leadership. Chinese Taoism praises it: Lao Tzu writes, "As for the best leaders, the people do not notice their existence ... When the best leader's work is done the people say, 'We did it ourselves!'" In Western culture, by contrast, the label éminence grise evokes the image of Père Joseph.

== Historical examples ==
=== Late medieval courts ===
Jonathan Dumont from the University of Liège applied the modern concept of the "grey eminence" to power structure of late mediaeval time in Europe that was characterized by informal and fluid decision-making, thus the powers of an individual sometimes exceeded his official rank. The boundaries of court offices were not yet institutionalized, and the individual frequently defined the office rather than vice versa. The late mediaeval eminence grise figures operated at the intersection of the public state administration and the private royal household, enabling the sovereign to bypass political deadlocks while consolidating personal power.

The grey eminences of the times exhibited multiple common traits:

- A strong personal link to the sovereign enabled the advisor to influence policies in the absence of a high title;
- A transclass status: the advisors frequently came from outside the high nobility, originating from merchant bourgeoisie, foreign and religious minorities (the stereotype of recruitment from the lower clergy generally does not hold), and thus were entirely dependent on the ruler. As a result, they usually aggressively accumulated material and symbolic capital, bringing them into conflict with the court establishment and were being considered to be parvenus.
- Bureaucratic and legal experience reflected the establishment of "government by paper" and included proficiency in the written word (ars dictaminis), legal training, and technical administrative skills in demand for the direct royal decision-making.
- Experience with financial matters came from backgrounds of handling personal mercantile fortunes or accounting positions, enabling advisors to connect the court to financial networks and secure loans for the crown, at the same time acting as intermediaries between the sovereign and regional elites.
- Talent for diplomacy and secrecy allowed advisors to execute discreet diplomatic missions and safely handle sensitive information.

This personality type was pervasive throughout Europe. For example, the career of the imperial chancellor Kaspar Schlick (c. 1396–1449), who rocketed from a bourgeois family to forge noble ties, resembles the trajectory of Nicolas Rolin (c. 1376–1462), the influential chancellor to the Duke of Burgundy. The bourgeois merchant background, immense financial influence, and eventual dramatic downfall of the Bohemian royal treasurer Zikmund Huler (d. 1405) parallel the life of the argentier of France Jacques Cœur (c. 1395–1456).

=== List ===
French historian Charles Zorgbibe identifies, in addition to Père Joseph himself, the following 15 prominent éminences grises:

- Beaumarchais – was involved with Louis XV and Louis XVI as well as the American insurgents
- Antoine-Henri Jomini – adviser to Napoleon
- Adam Jerzy Czartoryski – confidant to Tsar Alexander
- Friedrich von Gentz – political writer and adviser to Metternich
- Prince Napoléon-Jérôme Bonaparte – cousin to Napoleon III
- Juliette Adam – writer and political figure
- Friedrich von Holstein – adviser in the German Empire
- Rudyard Kipling – figure linked to the British Empire
- Edward M. House – adviser to Woodrow Wilson
- Jacques Bainville – on a mission to Russia for the Quai d'Orsay
- André Gide – involved in colonial politics
- Harry Hopkins – adviser to Franklin D. Roosevelt
- Jean Monnet – architect of European integration
- Jacques Foccart – adviser to Charles de Gaulle
- François de Grossouvre – adviser to François Mitterrand

== Types ==
Zorgbibe describes five types of éminence grise. He compares the different degrees of closeness to a ruler to the Carte de Tendre.

- Closest to the ruler is the prince's double. Zorgbibe's prototype is Father Joseph, installed by Richelieu in the Palais-Cardinal rather than left in his Capuchin cell. He compares him in this respect with Colonel House under Woodrow Wilson and Harry Hopkins, who stayed in the White House during Franklin D. Roosevelt's presidency.
- The éminence grise d'occasion ("occasional grey eminence") belongs to a particular affair rather than to a reign as a whole: Beaumarchais in the manoeuvres leading to French assistance for the American insurgents; Jacques Bainville during his 1916 mission to Russia; and André Gide after his journey through French Equatorial Africa. Gide's case was an unusual one, since the controversy following his account of the Congo gave him political influence without making him a regular participant in colonial policy.
- The inspirateur lointain (a "distant inspirer") influences the ruler from a distance. Zorgbibe gives three examples: Friedrich von Holstein, who had an important role in German foreign policy; Rudyard Kipling, through his writing on the British Empire; and Jean Monnet, through his work at the General Planning Commission.
- The "intruder" (éminence grise par effraction) comes from outside the ruler's circle. Zorgbibe's example is Antoine-Henri Jomini, who served on Napoleon's staff before entering Russian service.
- The close associates, proches, are relatives or friends of the ruler. They may advise him or receive his confidences, but are not his political doubles. Zorgbibe includes Adam Jerzy Czartoryski, close to the future Alexander I; Friedrich von Gentz, associated with Metternich; Prince Napoléon, a cousin of Napoleon III; and the Juliette Adam, who ran a salon frequented by the republican leaders.

== See also ==
- Camarilla
- Consigliere
- Kingmaker
- Power behind the throne
- Svengali

== Sources ==
- Dumont, Jonathan (2022). "Les « éminences grises » dans les cours tardo-médiévales. Réflexions autour d'une catégorie analytique" [The "grey eminences" in late medieval courts. Reflections on an analytical category]. Modèles, réseaux et échanges curiaux au Moyen Âge [Models, networks and courtly exchanges in the Middle Ages] (PDF) (in French). Paris: Éditions de la Sorbonne. pp. 135–149. Archived from the original (PDF) on December 15, 2025.
- Marturano, Antonio (2008). "Understanding Leadership: Is It Time for a Linguistic Turn?". In Ciulla, Joanne B. (ed.). Leadership and the Humanities. Leadership at the Crossroads. Vol. 3. Westport: Praeger. pp. 117–131.
- Zorgbibe, Charles (April 28, 2023). Les Éminences grises: Dans l'ombre des princes qui nous gouvernent [The Grey Eminences: In the Shadow of the Princes Who Govern Us] (in French). Éditions du Cerf. ISBN 978-2-204-15301-0.
