= Simona Paggi =

Italian film editor (born 1962)

- Born: 29 December 1962 (age 63); Milan, Italy
- Occupation: Film editor
- Years active: 1984-present

Simona Paggi (born 29 December 1962) is an Italian film editor.

She was nominated for the Academy Award for Best Film Editing for her work in the film Life Is Beautiful (1997) and won the David di Donatello for Best Editing for her work in The Stolen Children (1992). During her career, she became a close collaborator of directors like Gianni Amelio, Emanuele Crialese and John Turturro.

== Selected filmography ==
- Open Doors (1990)
- Traces of an Amorous Life (1990)
- The Stolen Children (1992)
- Lamerica (1994)
- Heartless (1995)
- Traveling Companion (1996)
- Life Is Beautiful (1997)
- The Way We Laughed (1998)
- Against the Wind (2000)
- Empty Eyes (2001)
- Momo (2001)
- Pinocchio (2002)
- Opopomoz (2003)
- The Keys to the House (2004)
- The Life That I Want (2004)
- The Missing Star (2006)
- The Sweet and the Bitter (2007)
- Passione (2010)
- Terraferma (2011)
- L'intrepido (2013)
- Fading Gigolo (2013)
- Tenderness (2017)
- The Jesus Rolls (2019)
- The Bad Poet (2020)
- The Good Mothers (TV series, 2023)
- Green Lava (Short film, 2025)
