= Benet Canfield =

English Recusant and mystic (1562–1610)

- Born: William Filch c. 1562; Little Canfield, United Kingdom
- Died: November 21, 1610 (aged 47–48); Paris, France
- Other names: Benoît de Canfield, Benoît de Canfeld, Father Benet

Benet Canfield, also known as Father Benet, Benoit of Canfield, or Benoît de Canfeld, (1562–1610), was an English Recusant and mystic. His Rule of Perfection served as a manual for two or three generations of mystics. For his influence on Madame Acarie, Pierre de Bérulle, André Duval, and Vincent de Paul he has been called the "Masters of masters".

== Life ==
Benet was born William Fitch at Little Canfield in Essex, the third of four sons of his father's second marriage. Around 1579 he began studies in London, at New Inn, one of the eight Inns of Chancery, and then at Middle Temple, one of the four Inns of Court. A discussion with a Dissenter convinced him that all Reformed theology was flawed (including that of his own Anglican Church).

Fitch came upon Robert Persons's The first booke of the Christian exercise, appertayning to Resolution, an important devotional work of the time, and decided to convert to Catholicism, then illegal in England. He went to study at the English Catholic college at Douai in Belgium, a major centre for English Recusants, or Catholics in exile, during the Elizabethan period. He entered the Capuchin order as a Friar in 1587 and was given the religious name of Benoît de Canfeld, "Benoît" the French form of Benedict, but in English he used the older form, Benet.

Completing his theological studies in Italy, he returned to Britain around 1599 and was immediately imprisoned, where he wrote his theological allegory, Le chevalier Chrestien. He was banished to France on an appeal by Henry IV of France in the spring of 1603. He became Master of Novices at Rouen in 1608, and was well known in the French Court. Benet was a teacher of Pierre de Bérulle, founder of the French school of spirituality, and of many interested in the spiritual renewal of France. Benet died in Paris on 21 November 1610.

== Works ==
In 1609, towards the end of his life, Benet published his masterpiece, Règle de perfection réduite au seul point de la volonté divine (Rule of Perfection). This work fell under the disapproval of the Church in the early 17th century, and is therefore less well-known than Holy Wisdom by his contemporary and associate Augustine Baker. Both authors deal with the subject of contemplative prayer, the deep form of prayer followed in monastic orders. Canfield was probably influenced by the Flemish mystic Jan Ruusbroec.

His Way of Perfection began to circulate widely in manuscript and even more widely in unauthorised printed editions. A letter of approbation printed at the beginning of The Rule of Perfection is signed by a number of doctors of the Sorbonne, including André Duval, who introduced it to Vincent de Paul. Vincent's words, "Do not tread on the heels of Providence," are taken from Canfield. This treatise "The Will of God" was translated into Latin in 1625 by order of the Minister General of the Order.

Benet brought out official editions of the first two parts of his work, but unfortunately not of the third, because he sensed stirrings of criticism from orthodox theologians about the boldness of his teachings on the higher levels of prayer. As a result, this third part is known only in its French and Italian translations, in which Benet had incorporated more conventional devotional elements to ensure its acceptability as an ascetical handbook. In this he failed as it was put on the Index of the Catholic Church in 1689 on the grounds that it came too close to the ideas of the Quietists who were then the subject of a major controversy, although it was not considered to be actually heretical.

== Criticism ==
In 1941 Aldous Huxley published his book Grey Eminence which focusses on François Leclerc du Tremblay upon whom Canfield was a major influence.

In 1959 Robert Rookwood's 1623 English translation The Lives of Ange De Joyeuse and Benet Canfield. Much of the account of Benet Canfield comes from his autobiography although this was attributed to Jacques Brousse, alongside his account of de Joyeuse.
