= Tonino Nardi =

Italian cinematographer

- Born: 25 September 1939; Pisa, Italy
- Died: 24 October 1993 (aged 54); Rome, Italy
- Occupation: Cinematographer

Tonino Nardi (25 September 1939 – 24 October 1993) was an Italian film cinematographer.

== Life and career ==
Born in Pisa Nardi debuted as a cinematographer in 1973, for the Gianni Amelio's debut film La città del sole, and since then he was a stable collaborator of Amelio in his following works. He also worked with other established directors such as Elio Petri, Mario Monicelli, Peter Del Monte, Marco Bellocchio

In 1990, Nardi was awarded best cinematographer at the 3rd edition of the European Film Awards for Amelio's Open Doors.

== Selected filmography ==
- Il gabbiano (1977)
- Good News (1979)
- Blow to the Heart (1983)
- Il diavolo sulle colline (1985)
- Little Flames (1985)
- The Rogues (1987)
- Regina (1987)
- Vampire in Venice (1988)
- Domino (1988)
- I ragazzi di via Panisperna (1989)
- Open Doors (1990)
- The Stolen Children (1992)
- Dear Goddamned Friends (1993)
