= The Missing Star =

- Directed by: Gianni Amelio
- Written by: Gianni Amelio, Umberto Contarello
- Produced by: 01 Distribution
- Starring: Sergio Castellitto, Tai Ling
- Cinematography: Luca Bigazzi
- Edited by: Simona Paggi
- Music by: Franco Piersanti
- Release date: 2006
- Running time: 104 min
- Countries: Italy; Singapore
- Languages: Italian; Chinese

La stella che non c'è (English: The Missing Star) is a 2006 Italian drama film written and directed by Gianni Amelio.

The story talks about an Italian engineer who went to China to fix a defect of old Italian steel-making equipment.

This movie shows real people's life (if not all, at least some) and the changing of society during the rapid development of the country.

== Plot summary ==
Vincenzo is an Italian engineer in a steel mill in bankruptcy, which is being acquired by a group of Chinese men. Vincenzo, not well understanding the real consequences of his work, is sent to China because there must advertise and repair a piece of industrial machinery. Vincenzo gets help from a young translator of Chinese, and the two falls in love; but he, when he returns to Italy, finds out that the factory is purchased, and that all Italian workers are laid off. So Vincenzo goes to China in an almost personal challenge to fix a potentially dangerous fault to the same machine now in China in spite of local people's indifference.

== Cast ==
- Sergio Castellitto: Vincenzo Buonavolontà
- Tai Ling: Liu Hua
- Angelo Costabile: young worker
- He Hiu Sun: Mr. Chong
- Catherine Sng: Chinese secretary
- Xu Chungqing: Director of the Office in Shanghai
