= Éminence Grise (painting) =

Painting by Jean-Léon Gérôme

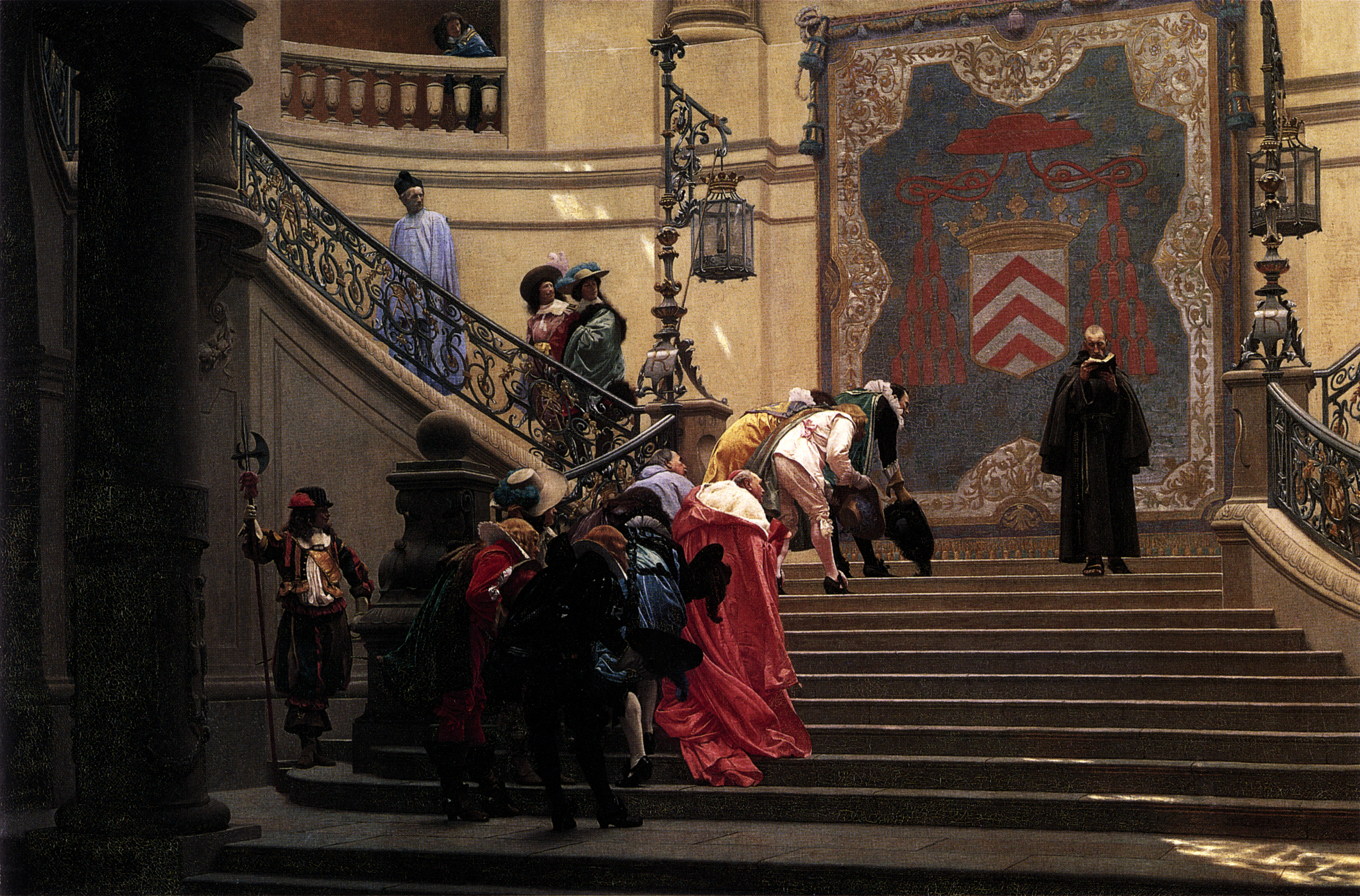
- Artist: Jean-Léon Gérôme
- Year: 1873
- Medium: Oil on canvas, history painting
- Dimensions: 68.6 cm × 101 cm (27.0 in × 40 in)
- Location: Museum of Fine Arts; Boston

Éminence Grise is an 1873 history painting by the French artist Jean-Léon Gérôme. It features a scene from seventeenth century during the reign of Louis XIII. François Leclerc du Tremblay, a trusted and influential advisor of the King's chief minister Cardinal Richelieu, is shown on a staircase of the Palais-Royal in Paris. Tremblay, in the humble dress of a Capuchin Friar, is being bowed to by courtiers dressed in extravagant finery in acknowledgement of his eminence. The term éminence grise has passed into language as an expression for someone who wields powerful influence while in an unofficial position. The painting was displayed at the Salon of 1874 in Paris. Today it is in the collection of the Museum of Fine Arts in Boston, Massachusetts having been purchased in 1903.

== Bibliography ==
- Ackerman, Gerald M. (1986). The Life and Work of Jean-Léon Gérôme. Sotheby's Publications.
- Patry, Sylvie; Robbins, Anne (2024). Paris 1874: The Impressionist Moment. Yale University Press.
