= François Leclerc du Tremblay =

French Capuchin friar and political adviser (1577–1638)

François Leclerc du Tremblay O.F.M Cap.
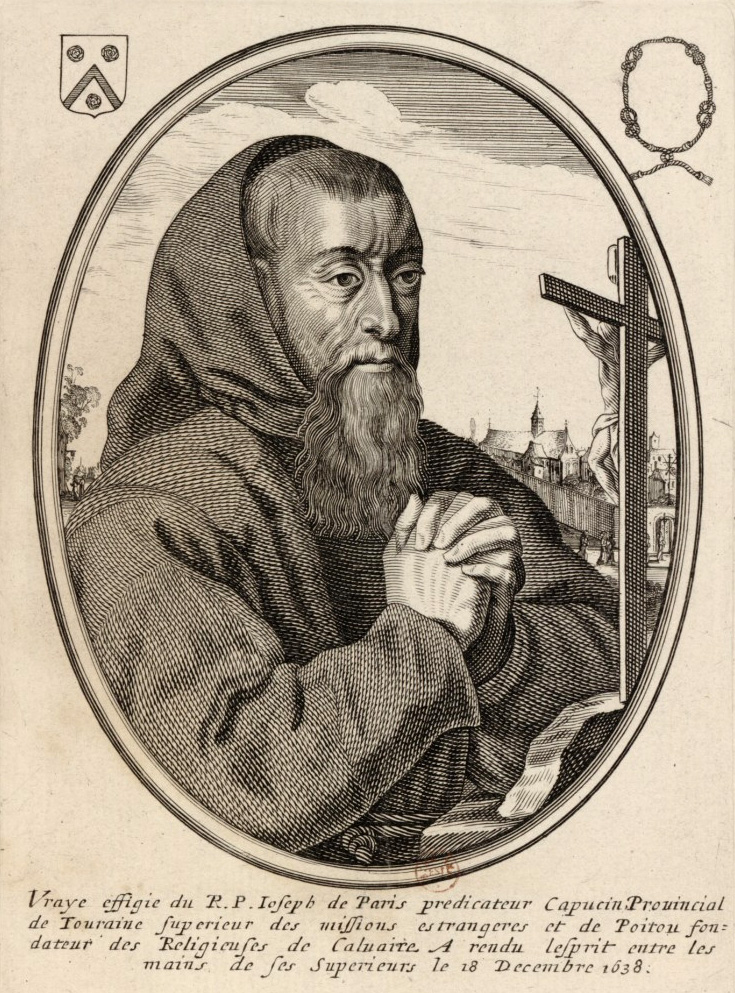
- Portrait engraving (Bibliothèque Nationale de France)
- Church: Roman Catholic Church

Personal details
- Born: 4 November 1577 Paris, France
- Died: 17 December 1638 (aged 61) Rueil-Malmaison, Île-de-France, France

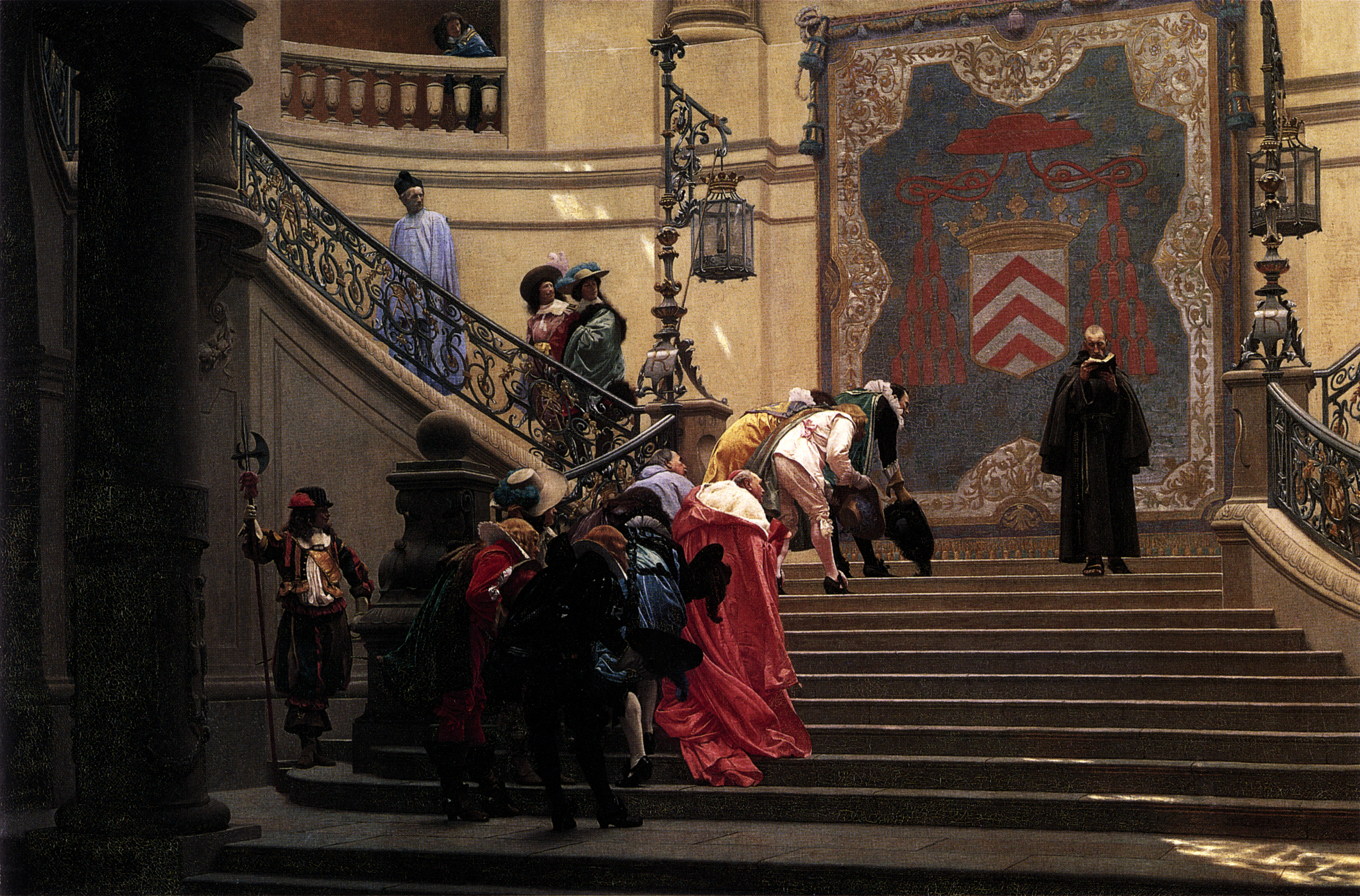
François Leclerc du Tremblay is the figure in black, depicted descending the staircase in this oil painting Éminence Grise (1873) by Jean-Léon Gérôme.

François Leclerc du Tremblay (4 November 1577 – 17 December 1638), also known as Père Joseph, was a French Capuchin friar, confidant and agent of Cardinal Richelieu. He was the original éminence grise ("gray eminence")—the French term for a powerful advisor or decisionmaker who operates secretly or unofficially.

== Biography ==
Leclerc was the eldest son of Jean Leclerc du Tremblay, president of the chamber of requests of the Parlement of Paris, and of Marie Motier de Lafayette. As a boy he received a careful classical training, and in 1595 made an extended journey through Italy, returning to take up the career of arms, serving at the siege of Amiens in 1597

On 2 February 1599, he entered the Capuchin Novitiate under the name of Joseph; on 3 February 1600, he renounced the world and entered the Capuchin priory of Orléans. He embraced the religious life with great ardor, and became a notable preacher and reformer. In 1606, he helped Antoinette d'Orléans-Longueville, a nun of Fontevrault, found the reformed order of the Filles du Calvaire, and he wrote a manual of devotion for the nuns. His proselytizing zeal led him to send missionaries to the centers of the Huguenot movement. In 1617, he received a papal brief from Rome that officially confirmed his establishment of the reformed Benedictine nuns at Notre Dame du Calvaire, a movement to which he dedicated himself as a preacher and reformer of religious orders.

He entered politics at the Conference of Loudun. There, as the confidant of the queen and the papal envoy, he opposed the Gallicanism advanced by the Parlement of Paris. He succeeded in convincing the princes that the stance harbored schismatic tendencies and they abandoned their initial support. In 1612, he established those personal relations with Cardinal Richelieu that established his reputation—and the phrase—éminence grise, though historical research has not been able to document his supposed influence on the latter. The description drew on the grey friar's cloak that Père Joseph wore and the title "eminence" conferred on Richelieu as a cardinal.

In 1627, Père Joseph was present at the siege of La Rochelle. Purely religious reason also made him Richelieu's ally against the Habsburgs. He had a dream of arousing Europe to another crusade against the Ottoman Empire and believed that the Habsburgs were an obstacle to making this possible. For Richelieu, he maneuvered at the Diet of Regensburg to thwart the aggression of the Habsburg emperor, and then recommended the intervention of Gustavus Adolphus, and the Protestant armies, thereby maintaining a balance of power.

He became a war minister, and, though maintaining a personal austerity of life, devoted himself to diplomacy and politics. He died in 1638, just as he was to be made a cardinal. The story that Richelieu visited him when on his deathbed and roused the dying man by the words, "Courage, Father Joseph, we have won Breisach", is apocryphal.

== Sources ==
- Huxley, Aldous (1941). Grey Eminence.
