= Zikmund Huler =

Zikmund Huler of Orlík

Sub-chamberlain of the Kingdom of Bohemia
- In office 7 November 1387 – 1405

Personal details
- Died: 23 July 1405 Old Town of Prague

Zikmund Huler of Orlík (Czech: Zikmund Huler z Orlíku; died 23 July 1405) was a Prague burgess, alderman, royal confidant, and sub-chamberlain. He got his toponymic surname of Orlík when he was granted the Orlík Castle in 1395.

== Early life ==
His early life is unknown. It is only known that the Huler family were influential burghers of Cheb and owned several fortresses in its vicinity.

== Career ==
Zikmund Huler was a Prague alderman in 1381–1382, 1384–1385, and 1387. On 7 November 1387, he became the sub-chamberlain of the Kingdom of Bohemia. He soon gained the king's favor and administered royal towns and estates. In the disputes between Wenceslaus IV and Archbishop Jan of Jenštejn, he stood on the side of the king. In 1402–1403, he was a fellow prisoner of the king in a Vienna prison. He remained there a year longer than the king.

== Conflict with the church ==
On Huler's orders, a student and a cleric were imprisoned in 1392 and 1393. They were executed for crimes they had committed. Archbishop Jan of Jenštejn had Zikmund Huler summoned before his tribunal through the vicar general, John of Nepomuk. When Huler did not appear, the archbishop excommunicated him. Huler took revenge, and John of Nepomuk, later Saint John of Nepomuk, paid for this dispute with his life. Otherwise, Zikmund Huler was very kind to the priests on his estates. This is evidenced by a foundation for the old settlement church near Orlík and the establishment of a chapel for hermits near Zátoň. In the church in Lažiště, there is a baptismal font with his coat of arms.

== Estates ==
Around 1390, King Wenceslaus IV pledged the Hus Castle castle with the towns of Záblatí and Husinec to Huler. In 1392, Huler bought the Kynžvart estate with Boršengrýn castle from Boreš VII of Rýzmburk. He did not hold it for long, and in 1395 he exchanged it with another royal favorite, Hanuš Pluh of Rabštejn, for Orlík Castle. He also owned Mladá Vožice with its accessories from 1397, the Velká Dobrá estate in the Kladno region, and several houses in Prague.

== Downfall and execution ==
He allegedly enriched himself illegally at the royal chamber. In 1405, the Dukes of Opole reminded King Wenceslaus IV of the arrears of the sum of 8,000 threescores of groschen, which he had borrowed from them in 1389. Wenceslaus IV produced a quittance of payment. However, since none of the witnesses to this loan were alive (three of them were victims of the Karlštejn murders in 1397), the Polish king Władysław II Jagiełło decided the dispute, and Zikmund Huler was entrusted with the task of recording it in the land registry. During the dispute, it was discovered that the document was a forgery, which Huler used to blame the deceased because he was accused of forgery using those murders. Zikmund Huler allegedly had a false receipt made for the arrears, which he showed to the king. He was convicted of this fraud and was beheaded in front of the Old Town Hall on 23 July 1405.

== Sources ==
- Boukal, Jan (2022). Vztahy města Cheb a české šlechty v pozdním středověku [Relations between the town Cheb and Bohemian nobility in the Late Middle Ages] (PDF) (Ph.D. thesis) (in Czech). Prague: Charles University.
- Händl, Richard (2016). "Zikmund Huler - tradiční zloduch" [Zikmund Huler - A Traditional Villain]. Šedé eminence v české historii [Grey Eminences in Czech History] (in Czech) (1st ed.). Brno: Jota. p. 264. ISBN 978-80-7462-650-0.
- Sedláček, August (1925). Českomoravská heraldika - II. část zvláštní [Bohemian-Moravian Heraldics - II. Special Part] (in Czech). Prague.
- Velímský, Tomáš (2002). Hrabišici. Páni z Rýzmburka [The Hrabiše Family, the Lords from Rýzmburk] (in Czech). Prague: Nakladatelství Lidové noviny. p. 390. ISBN 80-7106-498-X.
