= A Woman's Vengeance =

1948 film by Zoltan Korda

- Directed by: Zoltan Korda
- Screenplay by: Aldous Huxley
- Based on: The Gioconda Smile by Aldous Huxley
- Produced by: Zoltan Korda
- Starring: Charles Boyer; Ann Blyth; Jessica Tandy; Cedric Hardwicke
- Cinematography: Russell Metty
- Edited by: Jack Wheeler
- Music by: Miklós Rózsa
- Production company: Universal International Pictures
- Distributed by: Universal International Pictures
- Release date: March 2, 1948
- Running time: 96 minutes
- Country: United States
- Language: English
- Budget: $1.3 million

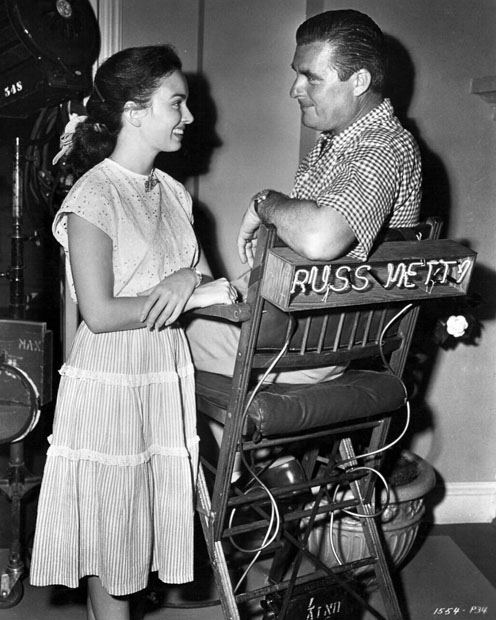
Ann Blyth and Russell Metty (cinematographer) on the set.

A Woman's Vengeance is a 1948 American film noir drama mystery film directed by Zoltán Korda and starring Charles Boyer, Ann Blyth, Jessica Tandy, Cedric Hardwicke, Rachel Kempson, and Mildred Natwick. The screenplay by Aldous Huxley was based on his 1922 novelette The Gioconda Smile. The film was produced and released by Universal Pictures.

== Plot ==
Henry Maurier rebounds from the death of wife Emily by marrying a much younger woman, Doris, upsetting another woman, Janet, who is in love with him. Suspicions grow that Henry might have hurried along his wife's death with poison, until eventually he finds himself condemned to death for a murder he didn't commit.

== Cast ==
- Charles Boyer as Henry Maurier
- Ann Blyth as Doris Mead
- Jessica Tandy as Janet Spence
- Cedric Hardwicke as Dr. James Libbard
- Mildred Natwick as Nurse Caroline Braddock
- Cecil Humphreys as General Spence
- Hugh French as Robert Lester
- Rachel Kempson as Emily Maurier
- Valerie Cardew as Clara
- Carl Harbord as Leslie Blake
- John Williams as Prosecuting Counsel
- Leyland Hodgson as First Warder
- Ola Lorraine as Malsey
- Harry Cording as Chauffeur McNabb
- Lydia Bilbrook as Mrs. Fellows
- Boyd Irwin as Mr. Craig
- Alec Harford as Dr. Dawson
- Elizabeth Valentine as Mrs. Wetherby
- Wilton Graff as Defence counsel
- Wilson Benge as Clerk
- Reginald Sheffield as Solicitor
- Patrick Aherne as Warder
- Colin Kenny as Warder
- Holmes Herbert as Warder
- Eric Wilton as Waiter
- Marjorie Eaton as Maid
- Leslie Denison as Inspector
- Mari Aldon as Girl
- Vernon Downing as Chemist
- Frederick Worlock as Judge

== Radio adaptation ==
A Woman's Vengeance was presented on Lux Radio Theatre March 22, 1948. Boyer and Blyth reprised their original roles in the adaptation.

== Bibliography ==
- Baxter, John. Charles Boyer: The French Lover. University Press of Kentucky, 2021.
- Spicer, Andrew. Historical Dictionary of Film Noir. Scarecrow Press, 2010.
