= Science, Liberty and Peace =

1946 essay by Aldous Huxley

- First edition (US)
- Author: Aldous Huxley
- Language: English
- Published: 1946, Harper & Brothers, (US); 1947, Chatto & Windus, (UK)
- Publication place: United Kingdom

Science, Liberty and Peace is an essay written by Aldous Huxley, published in 1946. The essay debates a wide range of subjects reflecting Huxley's views towards the direction of society at that time. He puts forward a number of predictions, many of which resonate far beyond the time when it was written. A consistent theme throughout the essay is Huxley's preference towards a decentralised society.

== Quotes ==
=== Centralized media corporations ===
"The man who pays the piper always calls the tune"

"Today, thanks to applied science, a dictator with the gift of the gab is able to pour his emotionally charged evangel into the ears of tens of millions"

"reading newspapers and listening to the radio are psychological addictions"

"I see the better and I approve; but the worst is what I pursue"

=== On the gradual removal of civil liberties ===
"If offered the choice between liberty and security, most people would unhesitatingly vote for security"

=== Materialism ===
"the dogma of inevitable progress became an unquestioned article of popular faith"

"the belief in all-round progress is based upon the wishful dream that one can get something for nothing"

=== History repeating itself ===
"the most important lesson in history, it has been said, is that nobody ever learns history's lessons"

=== National pride ===
"denies the value of a human being as a human being… affirms exclusiveness, encourages vanity, pride and self-satisfaction, stimulates hatred"

"As Athens and Sparta died of idolatry and flag-waving and jingoism"

=== Modern warfare ===
"advances in technology" .. "do not abolish the institution of war; they merely modify its manifestations"

"whenever some crisis makes us forget our surface rationality and idealism"

“.. to build enough launching ramps and robot planes..”

"when things go badly at home…. It is always possible…. To shift people's attention away from domestic to foreign and military affairs"

"it becomes unpatriotic for anyone to voice even the most justifiable complaints against mismanagement or oppression"

"armaments are the only goods that are given away without consideration of loss or profits"

"we need not be surprised if the plans for an international inspectorate and the pooling of scientific knowledge should fail in practice to produce the good results expected of them".

=== De-centralization ===
"the Emersonian doctrine of Self-Reliance”

"mechanical techniques for the production of many consumer goods for a local market"

"financial techniques … by which individuals can borrow money without increasing the power of the state or of commercial banks"

=== Banking ===
"legal techniques, through which a community can protect itself against the profiteer who speculates in land values, which he has done nothing whatever to increase"

"in the eyes of medieval Catholic theologians .. the profession of a moneylender or a speculator was beyond the pale"

=== The rise of China ===
"what will happen when India and China are as highly industrialized as pre-war Japan and seek to exchange their low-priced manufactured goods for food, in competition with Western powers, whose standard of living is a great deal higher than theirs?”

=== Exploiting Arctic resources ===
"the Russian power system and the Anglo-American power system"

=== Helpful technologies ===
"organized science could diminish these temptations to armed conflict by finding means for providing all countries, whatever their natural resources, with a sufficiency of power"

"the use of large-scale wind turbines is still, strangely enough, only in the experimental stage"

"One of the most urgent tasks before applied science is the development of some portable source of power to replace petroleum – a most undesirable fuel from a political point of view"

=== Science, technology, and freedom ===
Is there any way in which material advantages of progressive technology can be combined not only with security, but also with freedom? My own view, which is essentially that of the Decentralists, is that, so long as the results of pure science are applied for the purpose of mass-producing and mass-distributing industry more expensively elaborate and more highly specialized, there can be nothing but even greater centralization of power in even fewer hands. And the corollary of this centralization of economic and political power is the progressive loss by the masses of their civil liberties, their personal independence and their opportunities for self-government.

As theory, pure science is concerned with the reduction of diversity to identity. As a praxis, scientific research proceeds by simplification. These habits of scientific thought and action have, to a certain extent, been carried over into the theory and practice of contemporary politics. Where a centralized authority undertakes to make plans for an entire society, it is compelled by the bewildering complexity of the given facts to follow the example of the scientific experimenter, who arbitrarily simplifies his problem in order to make it manageable. In the laboratory this is a sound and entirely justifiable procedure. But when applied to the problems of human society, the process of simplification is a process, inevitably, of restraint and regimentation, of curtailment of liberty and denial of individual rights....Philosophically, this ironing out of individual idiosyncrasies is held to be respectable, because it is analogous to what is done by scientists, when they arbitrarily simplify an all too complex reality, so as to make nature comprehensible in terms of a few general laws.

Confronted by the data of experience, men of science begin by leaving out of account all those aspects of the facts which do not lend themselves to measurement and to explanation in terms of antecedent causes rather than of purpose, intention and values. Pragmatically they are justified in acting in this odd and extremely arbitrary way; for by concentrating exclusively on the measurable aspects of such elements of experience as can be explained in terms of a causal system they have been able to achieve a great and ever increasing control over the energies of nature. But power is not the same thing as insight and, as a representation of reality, the scientific picture of the world is inadequate, for the simple reason that science does not even profess to deal with experience as a whole, but only with certain aspects of it in certain contexts. All this is quite clearly understood by the more philosophically minded men of science. But unfortunately some scientists, many technicians and most consumers of gadgets have lacked the time and the inclination to examine the philosophical foundations and background of the sciences. Consequently they tend to accept the world picture implicit in the theories of science as a complete and exhaustive account of reality; they tend to regard those aspects of experience which scientists leave out of the account, because they are incompetent to deal with them, as being somehow less real than the aspects which science has arbitrarily chosen to abstract from out of the infinitely rich totality of given facts. Because of the prestige of science as a source of power, and because of the general neglect of philosophy, the popular Weltanschauung of our times contains a large element of what may be called 'nothing-but' thinking. Human beings, it is more or less tacitly assumed, are nothing but bodies, animals, even machines; the only really real elements of reality are matter and energy in their measurable aspects; values are nothing but illusions that have somehow got themselves mixed up with our experience of the world...The political consequences of this 'nothing-but' philosophy are clearly apparent in that widespread indifference to the values of human personality and human life which are so characteristic of the present age. Within the past thirty years, this indifference has expressed itself in a number of dangerous and disquieting ways. We have witnessed, first of all, the wholesale revival of slavery in its worst and most inhumane forms....
