= Mortal Coils =

1921 collection of short stories by Aldous Huxley

First edition (publ. Chatto & Windus)

Mortal Coils is a collection of five short fictional pieces written by Aldous Huxley, published in 1921. The book consists of three short stories, a novelette and a play.

The title uses a phrase from Hamlet, Act 3, Scene 1:

[...] To die, to sleep,

To sleep, perchance to dream; aye, there's the rub,
For in that sleep of death, what dreams may come,
When we have shuffled off this mortal coil,

Must give us pause [...]

The stories all concern themselves with some sort of trouble, normally of an amorous nature, and often ending with disappointment.

== Content ==
- "The Gioconda Smile", novelette:
  is a mixture of social satire and murder story, which Huxley later adapted into a film called A Woman's Vengeance (1948).
- "Permutations Among the Nightingales", play:
  is a play concerning the amorous problems encountered by various patrons of a hotel.
- "The Tillotson Banquet":
  tells of an old artist who was thought to be dead, and is "rediscovered"; a not entirely successful honorary dinner is organised for him.
- "Green Tunnels":
  is about the boredom of a young girl on holiday with her family. She develops a romantic fantasy, and is ultimately disillusioned.
- "Nuns at Luncheon":
  is a second-hand story told of a nun falling in love. The story mocks the writer's process, a concept Huxley used in his novel Crome Yellow.

== Adaptations ==
Based on novelette "The Gioconda Smile":

- A Woman's Vengeance (1948), film directed by Zoltan Korda
- Mortal Coils: Play (1948), play by Aldous Huxley
- Das Lächeln der Gioconda (1958), TV movie directed by Michael Kehlmann
- The Gioconda Smile (1963), TV movie directed by Patrick Barton
- Das Lächeln der Gioconda (1966), TV movie directed by Ilo von Jankó
- Mona Lisan hymy (1966), TV movie directed by Jukka Sipilä
- Úsmev Mony Lízy (1968), TV movie directed by Bedřich Kramosil

Based on play Mortal Coils: Play:

- Das Lächeln der Gioconda (1953), TV movie directed by Werner Völger
- Il sorriso della Gioconda (1969), TV movie directed by Enrico Colosimo
