= Open Doors (film) =

1990 Italian film by Gianni Amelio

Porte aperte
- Directed by: Gianni Amelio
- Written by: Gianni Amelio; Vincenzo Cerami; Alessandro Sermoneta
- Starring: Gian Maria Volonté; Ennio Fantastichini; Renato Carpentieri
- Cinematography: Tonino Nardi
- Edited by: Simona Paggi
- Music by: Franco Piersanti
- Distributed by: Orion Classics (US)
- Release date: 29 March 1990
- Running time: 108 minutes
- Country: Italy
- Language: Italian
- Box office: $252,000 (Italy)

Open Doors (Italian: Porte aperte) is a 1990 Italian film directed by Gianni Amelio, based on the 1987 novel of the same name by Leonardo Sciascia. Set in 1930s Palermo, the film follows a judge who challenges the prevailing support for the death penalty. His stance is tested when a man perpetrates a gruesome triple murder, sparking conflict with both the fascist regime and public sentiment, ultimately compelling him to confront his moral principles.

The film received an Academy Award nomination for Best Foreign Language Film at the 63rd Academy Awards.

== Plot ==
In 1936, in Palermo, a former judicial officer named Tommaso Scalia brutally murders the former top lawyer, Spatafora, who was responsible for his dismissal, along with his colleague who replaced him due to their association with a fascist organization. He then proceeds to assault and kill his own wife before turning himself in to the police. The public demands Scalia's execution, and the justice system, aligned with Mussolini's regime, is eager to comply. However, a jury member named Vito Di Francesco, opposed to capital punishment, attempts to uncover the true motives behind the crimes through subtle questioning of witnesses. Throughout the trial, he clashes not only with the prosecutor and court officials, who prioritize strict adherence to state laws even at the expense of humanity, but also faces hostility from the defendant himself.

Consolo, a modest landowner serving as a juror, supports Di Francesco's approach. Eventually, Scalia is sentenced to a prison term instead of execution. Shortly after, Di Francesco is transferred to a remote district court, where his idea that justice should be guided by principles of fairness rather than political agendas fails to attract attention.

== Cast ==
- Gian Maria Volonté as Judge Vito di Francesco
- Ennio Fantastichini as Tommasco Scalia
- Renato Carpentieri as Consolo
- Tuccio Musumeci as Spatafora
- Silverio Blasi as Attorney
- Vitalba Andrea as Rosa Scalia
- Giacomo Piperno as Prosecutor
- Lydia Alfonsi as Marchesa Anna Pironti
- Renzo Giovampietro as President Sanna

== Awards and nominations ==
=== Won ===
- 1991 David di Donatello:
  - Best Actor - Gian Maria Volonté
  - Best Costume Design - Gianna Gissi
  - Best Film
  - Best Sound - Remo Ugolinelli
- 3rd European Film Awards:
  - Best Cinematography
  - Best Film
  - Discovery of the Year Award - Ennio Fantastichini
- Italian Golden Globes:
  - Best Actor - Gian Maria Volonté
  - Best Film
  - Best Screenplay
- Italian National Syndicate of Film Journalists
  - Best Director
  - Best Supporting Actor - Ennio Fantastichini
- Montpellier Mediterranean Film Festival
  - Critics Award - Gianni Amelio
  - Golden Antigone - Gianni Amelio

=== Nominated ===
- 63rd Academy Awards:
  - Best Foreign Language Film
- 1991 David di Donatello:
  - Best Cinematography - Tonino Nardi
  - Best Director - Gianni Amelio
  - Best Editing - Simona Paggi
  - Best Producer - Angelo Rizzoli Jr.
  - Best Production Design - Amedeo Fago, Franco Velchi
  - Best Screenplay - Gianni Amelio, Vincenzo Cerami
  - Best Supporting Actor - Ennio Fantastichini
- 3rd European Film Awards:
  - Special Prize of the Jury - Gian Maria Volonté
- Italian National Syndicate of Film Journalists
  - Best Actor - Gian Maria Volonté
  - Best Screenplay

== See also ==
- List of submissions to the 63rd Academy Awards for Best Foreign Language Film
- List of Italian submissions for the Academy Award for Best Foreign Language Film

Awards
Preceded by Landscape in the Mist	European Film Award for Best European Film; 1990	Succeeded by Riff-Raff
