= The Stolen Children =

- Il ladro di bambini
- Directed by: Gianni Amelio
- Written by: Gianni Amelio; Sandro Petraglia; Stefano Rulli; Giorgia Cecere
- Produced by: Angelo Rizzoli Jr
- Starring: Enrico Lo Verso; Valentina Scalici; Giuseppe Ieracitano; Florence Darel; Marina Golovine
- Cinematography: Tonino Nardi; Renato Tafuri
- Edited by: Simona Paggi
- Music by: Franco Piersanti
- Distributed by: D.A.R.C (Italy); The Samuel Goldwyn Company (USA)
- Release date: 10 April 1992
- Running time: 114 minutes
- Country: Italy
- Language: Italian
- Box office: $8.5 million (Italy/US)

The Stolen Children (Italian: Il ladro di bambini) is a 1992 Italian film directed by Gianni Amelio. The film was selected as the Italian entry for the Best Foreign Language Film at the 65th Academy Awards, but was not accepted as a nominee.

== Plot ==
11-year-old Rosetta and 9-year old Luciano live with their mother in the housing projects of Milan. Internal migrants from Sicily, they face prejudice in their adopted city. Their mother is unemployed and their father has long since abandoned them. For the past two years, the mother has hired her daughter out as a prostitute. The authorities raid the place and arrest the mother and a client. The children are destined to be sent to a Catholic orphanage in Civitavecchia, near Rome. Two carabinieri, the rookie Antonio and an older man named Grignani are assigned the thankless task of escorting the children there by train. Grignani walks out on Antonio at Bologna, leaving Antonio to complete the task alone.

The children are unruly, often fighting or running off in different directions. Luciano is sickly, doesn't eat much and rarely speaks. Rosetta is cynical, rebellious and manipulative. When they arrive at the orphanage, the priest in charge tells Antonio that the children cannot stay because Rosetta's medical record is missing. Antonio suspects that they are using this as a pretext because of her background as a prostitute.

Antonio calls Grignani at the number he provided and explains the situation, but Grignani is no help. Rather than contact his superiors for further instructions and expose his partner's misconduct, Antonio naively decides to take matters into his own hands and bring the children to another institute in their native Sicily. His plan immediately runs into problems when Luciano has an asthma attack on the way to the train station, causing them to miss the train. They spend an awkward night at the bachelor pad of a carabiniere acquaintance of Antonio's.

After a long train and coach journey, the trio arrive unannounced at Antonio's sister's home in Calabria, which doubles as a restaurant. There they celebrate a young girl's First Communion. Antonio tells his family that Rosetta and Luciano are the children of one of his superiors. Given a stylish age-appropriate summer dress to wear, Rosetta plays and socializes with other girls her age, while Luciano is befriended by Antonio's grandmother, who gives him a photo of a six-year-old Antonio in a Zorro costume. Their fun, however, is short-lived as one of the guests at the party recognizes Rosetta from an article in a tabloid magazine and exposes her past to the other guests. Rosetta, humiliated and ashamed, dashes from the house. Antonio runs after her and comforts her, saying the woman is an idiot and it doesn't matter what she thinks. Antonio has cracked through Rosetta's tough exterior and now feels a genuine sense of compassion for her and her brother, rather than a simple sense of duty.

Antonio, who has acquired an old Fiat 128, agrees to remove Rosetta from the place immediately, and drives them to the ferry terminal at the Strait of Messina. On the ferry, he finally has a conversation with Luciano. Rather than driving directly to the orphanage in Gela, he takes another detour, taking them to a cheap hotel near Marina di Ragusa where he rents two adjoining rooms.

The next day, they visit the beach, where he teaches Luciano to swim, forming a close bond with him. There, they meet two young French women, who take a liking to Rosetta. The five of them drive to Noto and visit the Noto Cathedral. One of the tourists gives Rosetta her camera, which is then snatched from her. Antonio chases down the thief and arrests him, taking him to the local police station.

At the station, one of the tourists learns of the background of the children, and insensitively talks about it with her friend. When Rosetta overhears the word "prostitute" her friendly demeanour towards the women instantly disappears. Antonio is accused of kidnapping and abusing the children, and failure to follow orders. He is forced to hand in his warrant card pending a court martial. After several hours they are all released.

Antonio drives the children to Gela late into the night. Upset at the probable loss of his career, he says very little during the journey. Having nearly reached their final destination, Antonio pulls over to an abandoned block where all three of them fall asleep in the car. The children wake up at early dawn, and walk off to the side of the road, where they sit together and talk about their future in the orphanage.

== Cast ==
- Enrico Lo Verso - Antonio
- Valentina Scalici - Rosetta
- Giuseppe Ieracitano - Luciano
- Florence Darel - Martine
- Marina Golovine - Nathalie
- Fabio Alessandrini - Grignani
- Agostino Zumbo - Priest
- Vitalba Andrea - Antonio's Sister
- Massimo De Lorenzo - Papaleo
- Celeste Brancato - Girl at Dinner
- Vincenzo Peluso - Carabiniere
- Santo Santonocito - Carabiniere
- Renato Carpentieri - Chief of Police
- Maria Pia Di Giovanni - Mother of Rosetta and Luciano
- Lello Serao - Arrested Man

== Production ==
The producers originally wanted to cast Antonio Banderas in the lead role, with Enrico Lo Verso's southern Italian accent dubbed over, but director Gianni Amelio insisted that Lo Verso was perfect for the role. Influenced by the Italian neorealist cinematic tradition, Amelio cast non-actors for the majority of the roles, including the two child leads. Adding to the sense of authenticity, all filming was done on location. Principal photography began on May 6, 1991, and ended on September 12, 1991.

The Italian title Il ladro di bambini literally translates as "The child thief", an ironic reference to the fact that in taking the children on an unauthorised journey, Antonio has technically kidnapped them. It is also a nod to Vittorio de Sica's neorealist classic Ladri di biciclette.

== Reception ==
=== Box office ===
The film was number one at the Italian box office for seven weeks and grossed $7.5 million. In the United States and Canada it grossed nearly $1 million.

=== Critical response ===
The Stolen Children received widespread critical acclaim. It has an approval rating of 86% on review aggregator website Rotten Tomatoes, based on 7 reviews, and an average rating of 7.8/10.

Roger Ebert gave it 4 stars out of 4, saying "Here is a movie with the spontaneity of life; watching it is like living it." In the 2012 Sight & Sound poll of the greatest films of all time, Cineaste's Gary Crowdus included Il ladro di bambini in his top 10 list.

=== Awards and nominations ===
- 1992 Cannes Film Festival - Grand Prize of the Jury, Prize of the Ecumenical Jury
- European Film Awards - Best Film
- 6 David di Donatello - Best Film, Best Director, Best Producer, Best Editing, Best Music, Special David for their child acting (Giuseppe Ieracitano & Valentina Scalici)
- 2 Nastro d'Argento - Best Director, Best Screenplay
- The film was nominated for the prestigious Grand Prix of the Belgian Syndicate of Cinema Critics.

== See also ==
- List of submissions to the 65th Academy Awards for Best Foreign Language Film
- List of Italian submissions for the Academy Award for Best Foreign Language Film
