= Jacob's Hands: A Fable =

Short story by Aldous Huxley and Christopher Isherwood

First edition (publ. St Martin's Press)

"Jacob's Hands: A Fable" is a short story written by Aldous Huxley and Christopher Isherwood, originally written for the screen. The manuscript lay hidden in a trunk on the Huxley estate for fifty years before being discovered by actress Sharon Stone in 1997.

The story was produced for the CBS Radio series CBS Radio Workshop on April 13, 1956. Isherwood narrated and the performers included Herb Butterfield, Helen Kleeb, Vic Perrin, Lawrence Dobkin, and Janet Stewart.

== Plot summary ==
Jacob Ericson is a shy, enigmatic, and somewhat aloof ranch hand who works for crotchety Professor Carter and his crippled daughter Sharon, on a ranch in the California Mojave Desert in the 1920s. One day he learns that his hands possess the mysterious gift of healing, a gift he uses to cure animals, which he adores. Sharon, whom he also adores, then persuades him to heal her.

When he successfully cures her, his gift is quickly exploited and the boundaries of his charm and naivete begin to stretch. First he offers his healing powers for free at a church in Los Angeles, where he has gone in pursuit of Sharon after she fled her father and the ranch to follow her dreams of stardom. Jacob and Sharon cross paths when they work for the same pair of exploitative showmen.

Jacob stays with the seedy stage show only because Sharon is close by. It is when Jacob's gift is recruited to heal Earl Medwin, an eccentric, ailing young millionaire, that the love and security for which he has worked so hard begin to evaporate.
