= The Genius and the Goddess =

1955 novel by Aldous Huxley

- First edition
- Author: Aldous Huxley
- Language: English
- Genre: Romance novel
- Publisher: Chatto and Windus
- Publication date: December 1955
- Publication place: United Kingdom
- Media type: Print (Hardback & Paperback)
- Pages: 128 pp
- OCLC: 28899893

The Genius and the Goddess (1955) is a novel by Aldous Huxley. It is the fictional account of John Rivers, a student physicist in the 1920s who was hired out of college as a laboratory assistant to Henry Maartens.

== Plot summary ==
The story begins in 1951. John Rivers is speaking to a friend about his encounter with the Maartens family. In 1921, Rivers, who was extremely sheltered by his widowed mother, is employed as a lab assistant to Henry Maartens, after receiving his PhD. Dr. Maartens is a Nobel Prize–winning, socially awkward physicist. Rivers is invited to live in Henry's home until he finds his own place, but the Maartens family soon develops a fondness for Rivers, and insists that he stay with them. Rivers develops respect and fondness for the family, regarding Henry as a genius and his wife Katy as a goddess. As his attraction towards Katy grows, Rivers is simultaneously victimized by her 15-year-old daughter Ruth. After being rejected by a 17-year-old football player and scholarship winner, Ruth tries to be a dramatic poetess. She fantasizes that she is in love with Rivers to find solace and an outlet for her emotions.

Rivers' experience with the Maartens family takes an important turn when Katy has to leave for a time to care for her dying mother. The unstable, asthmatic Henry becomes an emotional wreck without his much younger wife to care for him. The children, the household, and Henry himself are cared for only by the housekeeper Beulah and Rivers. Ruth takes advantage of her mother's absence to entertain her cosmetic interests and act out her imaginary love for Rivers, who just laughs at Ruth's poems.

Katy returns sooner than planned because of Henry's declining health. She herself has lost so much vitality that she cannot minister Henry any longer. Learning of her mother's death, Katy turns to Rivers for comfort. Their relationship becomes sexual. Having lost his virginity, Rivers feels guilt for betraying his mother and pious background, and also for betraying his sick master Henry Maartens. Katy is revitalized. As Henry recovers, Katy and Rivers continue their affair secretly. Ruth suspects Rivers of being in love with her mother, and presents him with a poem that subtly describes his affair with her mother. Rivers laughs off the poem, says that it reminds him of his father's sermons, and hides his true emotions.

Katy and Rivers agree that he must leave. Rivers prepares to leave, saying that his mother is ill, but Katy and Ruth die in a car accident. Rivers is dejected and only recovers because he meets Helen, his future wife, at a party. Henry lives on and marries Katy's sister, who dies due to her obesity. After her death, Henry Maartens had a last and fourth marriage to a young redhead named Alicia. Henry dies at the age of 87. The story ends with Rivers, having Henry's biography and the memories of his life at the Maartens'.

== Themes ==
The short novel is packed with literary and socio-historical references and allusions. Huxley portrays various aspects of his ideology about subjects such as God, sex, history, literature, intellect and death.

== Characters ==
- John Rivers – a physics student, protagonist
- Henry Maartens – physicist
- Katy Maartens – Henry's wife
- Ruth Maartens – Henry's daughter

== Adaptations ==
Based on the novel:

- The Genius and the Goddess (1958), play written by Aldous Huxley and Betty Wendel

Based on the play:

- Das Genie und die Göttin (1959), TV movie directed by Walter Rilla

== Play version ==
The Genius and the Goddess was adapted into a play. Courtney Burr brought in Alec Coppel to work on it. Huxley was dissatisfied with the result.
