= Angelo Nicolini =

Roman Catholic cardinal

Angelo Nicolini (1505–1567) was an Italian Roman Catholic bishop and cardinal. He began his career as a politician and lawyer and entered the priesthood after his wife died. He was named cardinal by Pope Pius IV and participated in the election of his successor, Pope Pius V.

== Biography ==
Angelo Nicolini was born in Florence in 1505, the son of Matteo Nicolini. He attended the University of Pisa, becoming a doctor of both laws in 1523. In 1530, he married Alessandra di Vincenzo Ugolini; the couple had four children before his wife's death in 1550. He was a counsellor to Cosimo I de' Medici, Grand Duke of Tuscany, who entrusted him with many important missions and made him a senator. He was the ambassador of Duchy of Florence to the court of Pope Paul III, and then, in 1538, to Charles V, Holy Roman Emperor. He became governor of Siena in 1557. Nicolini was also interested in the arts and as Vasari notes commissioned a painting of our Lady by Domenico Puligo which he kept in his house on the Canto de' Pazzi in Florence .

After his wife's death, he entered the service of the church, becoming a priest. On 14 July 1564, he was elected Archbishop of Pisa.

Pope Pius IV made him a cardinal priest in the consistory of 12 March 1565. He received the red hat and the titular church of San Callisto on 15 May 1565. He participated in the papal conclave of 1565-66 that elected Pope Pius V.

He died in Siena on 15 August 1567. He was buried in the Basilica of Santa Croce, Florence.
