= Grey Eminence =

1941 book by Aldous Huxley

- First UK edition (publ. Chatto & Windus)
- Author: Aldous Huxley
- Subject: François Leclerc du Tremblay
- Genre: Biography
- Publication date: 1941

Grey Eminence: A Study in Religion and Politics is a book by Aldous Huxley published in 1941. It is a biography of François Leclerc du Tremblay, the French monk who served as advisor to Cardinal de Richelieu and was referred to by others as l'éminence grise. As the subtitle indicates Huxley is asking "What is religion?", "What is politics?" and "How are religion and politics related?"

Huxley depicts the career of Tremblay as an example of what can happen when a person's powerful spiritual energies are channelled in the wrong direction. Huxley praises his early preaching and ministering to the sick and poor, his reflections and writings on a life of prayer through which, Huxley thinks, he came close to sanctity: "'at peace and happy in the conviction that his true vocation had been revealed to him" (p. 86). However, Huxley argues, the influence of Benet of Canfield, led Tremblay to abandon the traditional Christian mystical tradition, whereby the imagination was to be set aside once it had initiated a process of mystical ascent. Instead, Benet's followers developed a way whereby image and will came to impede spiritual enlightenment and "direct mystical experience" was subordinated to a personalised theology.
