= Magisano =

- Comune
- Comune di Magisano
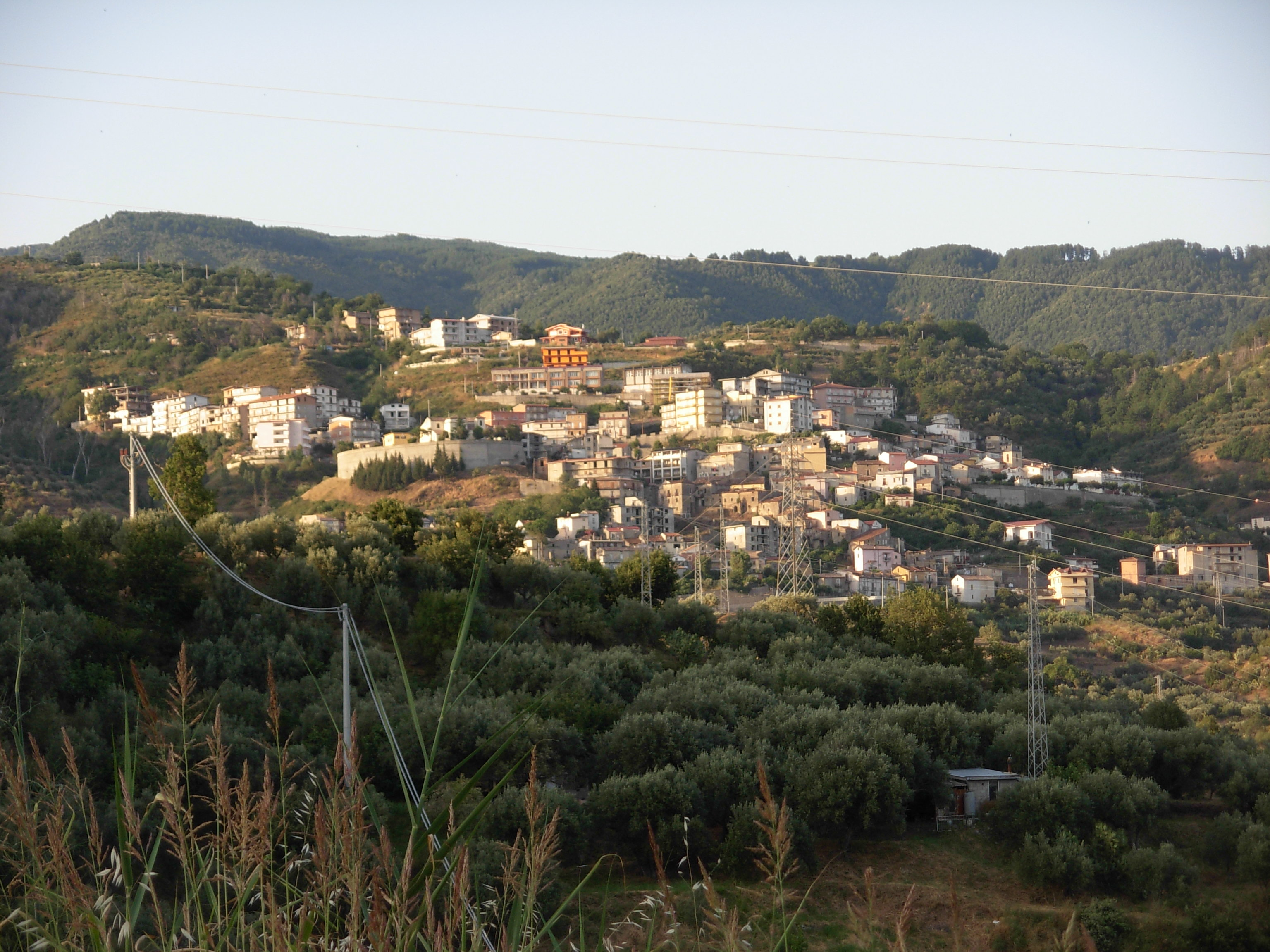

- Location within Italy Location within Calabria
- Coordinates: 39°1′N 16°38′E
- Country: Italy
- Region: Calabria
- Province: Catanzaro (CZ)
- Frazioni: San Pietro a Magisano, Vincolise

Government
  - Mayor: Fiore Tozzo

Area
  - Total: 31.94 km^{2} (12.33 sq mi)
- Elevation: 750 m (2,460 ft)

Population (30 September 2017)
  - Total: 1,202
  - Density: 37.63/km^{2} (97.47/sq mi)
- Demonym: Magisanesi
- Time zone: UTC+1 (CET)
  - Summer (DST): UTC+2 (CEST)
- Postal code: 88050
- Dialing code: 0961
- Patron saint: St. Mary, St. Peter, St. Simon
- Website: Official website

Magisano is a comune and town in the province of Catanzaro in the Calabria region, southern Italy.
