= Antic Hay =

1923 satiric novel by Aldous Huxley

- First edition
- Author: Aldous Huxley
- Language: English
- Publisher: Chatto & Windus (UK); Doran (US)
- Publication date: 1923
- Publication place: United Kingdom
- Media type: Print (hardback & paperback)
- Pages: 328

Antic Hay is a novel by Aldous Huxley, published in 1923. The story takes place in London, and gives a satiric depiction of the aimless or self-absorbed cultural elite in the sad and turbulent times following the end of World War I.

A 1923 review opined that Antic Hay was "probably the most brilliant novel of the year" and summarized Huxley's theme as "contemporary civilization is damnable, and...the dark stream of Time is the only reality." A 1961 scholarly journal article characterized the book's theme as "disunity, disorder and disorganization" whose characters "illustrate a disreputable world disintegrating into fragments." It reinforced Huxley's reputation as an iconoclast. The book was condemned for its cynicism and for its supposed immorality because of its open debate on sex. The novel was banned for a while in Australia and burned in Cairo.

Superficially the story follows Theodore Gumbril, a teacher in an English boarding school who invents Gumbril's Patent Small-Clothes, trousers which contain a pneumatic cushion in the seat.

Gumbril's quest for love occasionally makes him resort to utilizing "The Complete Man" which is a disguise he concocts around a false full beard. With it he is able to overcome his shyness and approach women in public places with a bold directness. However he is then left with the problem of how he reveals his real self to the women he befriends.

The novel was written just after Huxley and his wife moved to Italy, where they lived from 1923 to 1927.

The title is from the play Edward II by Christopher Marlowe, c1593, Act One, Scene One, lines 59-60: "My men, like satyrs grazing on the lawns, shall with their goat feet dance the antic hay", which is quoted on the frontispiece. "Antic hay", here, refers to a playful dance.

The manuscripts for the novel are part of the collection of the University of Houston Library.

The novel was mentioned briefly in Evelyn Waugh's novel Brideshead Revisited (1945):

'Picture me, my dear, alone and studious. I had just bought a rather forbidding book called Antic Hay, which I knew I must read before going to Garsington on Sunday, because everyone was bound to talk about it, and it's so banal saying you have not read the book of the moment, if you haven't.'
