= Il piccolo Archimede =

- Directed by: Gianni Amelio
- Screenplay by: Gianni Amelio
- Based on: The Young Archimedes by Aldous Huxley
- Produced by: Lucia Campione; Corrado Caselli
- Starring: Laura Betti; John Steiner
- Cinematography: Guido Bertoni
- Edited by: Giorgio Pozzi
- Music by: Roman Vlad
- Release date: 1979
- Running time: 83 minutes
- Country: Italy
- Language: Italian

Il piccolo Archimede (internationally released as The Little Archimedes) is a 1979 Italian comedy-drama film written and directed by Gianni Amelio. It is an adaptation of Aldous Huxley's short story "The Young Archimedes" (1924). For her role Laura Betti was awarded as best actress at the San Sebastián International Film Festival.

== Cast ==
- Laura Betti: Miss Bondi
- Shirley Corrigan: Elisabeth
- Mark Morganti: Robin
- John Steiner: Alfred
