= Limbo (short story collection) =

Short story collection by Aldous Huxley

First US edition (publ. George H. Doran Company)

Limbo is the first collection of short fiction by Aldous Huxley, published in 1920. The book consists of five short stories, a novelette and a play.

== Content ==
- "Farcical History of Richard Greenow", novelette
- "Happily Ever After"
- "Eupompus Gave Splendour to Art by Numbers"
- "Happy Families", play
- "Cynthia"
- "The Bookshop"
- "The Death of Lully"
