= Crome Yellow =

Novel by Aldous Huxley

- 1922 US edition
- Author: Aldous Huxley
- Language: English
- Publisher: Chatto & Windus (UK); George H. Doran Company (US)
- Publication date: 1921
- Publication place: United Kingdom
- Media type: Print (Hardback)
- Pages: 307
- ISBN: 9781613109847
- Followed by: Antic Hay
- Text: Crome Yellow at Wikisource

Crome Yellow is the first novel by British author Aldous Huxley, published by Chatto & Windus in 1921, followed by a U.S. edition by George H. Doran Company in 1922. Though a social satire of its time, it is still appreciated and has been adapted to different media.

== Publication and reception ==
Crome Yellow was written during the summer of 1921 in the Tuscan seaside resort of Forte dei Marmi and published in November of that year. In view of its episodic nature, the novel was described in The Spectator as "a Cubist Peacock". This was in recognition of the fact that it was modelled on (and publicised as in the tradition of) Thomas Love Peacock’s country-house novels. There diverse types of the period are exhibited interacting with each other and holding forth on their personal intellectual conceits. There is little plot development. Indeed, H. L. Mencken questioned whether its comedy of manners could be called a novel at all but hailed with delight the author's "shrewdness, ingenuity, sophistication, impudence, waggishness and contumacy."

At the same time F. Scott Fitzgerald observed how within the novel's ambiguous form Huxley created structures and then demolished them "with something too ironic to be called satire and too scornful to be called irony." In addition, the open treatment of sexuality there appeared significant to Henry Seidel Canby. Although "Nothing important happens ... the story floats and sails upon the turbid intensity of restless sex."

== Plot ==
A house party at Crome is viewed largely through the eyes of Denis Stone. Described by his hostess as "one of our younger poets", he has been invited by Priscilla and Henry Wimbush to join their summer guests. Denis is secretly in love with their niece, Anne Wimbush, who appears more interested in the artist Gombauld. The rather naïve flapper, Mary Bracegirdle, decides to embark on an amorous adventure so as to overcome her repressions and makes unsuccessful advances to Denis and Gombauld before falling for the libertine Ivor Lombard one summer night. (Note: Ivor Lombard was inspired by Evan Morgan, 2nd Viscount Tredegar) The hard-of-hearing Jenny Mullion confines most of her thoughts on what goes on to her journal, in which Denis eventually discovers a devastating deconstruction of himself and fellow guests. Mr. Wimbush, the owner of Crome, has been writing a history of the house and its family, from which he gives two evening readings. His wife is obsessed with alternative spirituality and finds a fellow sympathiser in the prolific literary hack, Mr. Barbecue-Smith. Also part of the party is Henry's former schoolfriend, the cynical Mr. Scogan, who lies in wait for anyone he can waylay with his reductive criticisms of the time and his visions for a dystopian future. After several ludicrous failures in trying to capture Anne's affection, Denis despairingly arranges to be recalled home on "urgent family business" at the very moment when he might have succeeded and departs on the same slow train that had brought him.

== Themes ==
Huxley's satire on the fads and fashions of the time is generally based on real places and people. The description of the country house at which the characters gather is recognisably based on Garsington Manor, while Ottoline Morrell has been taken for the model of Priscilla Wimbush. Scogan has been identified with Bertrand Russell, Gombauld with Mark Gertler, Mr. Calamy with H. H. Asquith, and Mary Bracegirdle with Dora Carrington. Even small comic details sometimes have a foundation in fact, as for example Mrs. Budge's massive consumption of peaches as part of the war effort. Osbert Sitwell claimed that this was based on an anecdote he had told Huxley about his own father.

Some incidents in the novel allow others to grow out of them. The story of Sir Hercules Lapith, Henry Wimbush's predecessor at Crome, has imbedded within it some 64 lines in Augustan heroic couplets, far longer than all the parodies of modern verse in the book. Its function is to give an insight into its author’s motives for creating his alternative society for dwarfs at his home. At the same time it is a parody within a parody, since it appears as part Sir Henry's modern-day history of the house, itself a narrative within the main narrative.

Scogan's withering sketch of the contemporary novel whose subject is a sensitive young man’s development so appalls Denis Stone that he destroys the first two chapters of the novel he has brought with him to continue at Crome. On the one hand this may have been directed at James Joyce's Portrait of the Artist as a Young Man, which had been published in the previous decade. But it has also been conjectured that Crome Yellow itself is a parody of the sort of novel Denis is dissuaded from continuing. Here too the comparatively recent past model encapsulates the present text.

Conversely, a future text is prefigured in Scogan's prophecy of the "impersonal generation" that will "take the place of Nature's hideous system" by raising its children in incubators. "The family system will disappear; society, sapped at its very base, will have to find new foundations; and Eros, beautifully and irresponsibly free, will flit like a gay butterfly from flower to flower through a sunlit world." It is an idea that Huxley would revisit at greater length in Brave New World (1932), but by that time he had passed from satirising the self-absorption and consequent lack of a vision of a positive way forward following the destructive barbarism of the First World War to examining aspects of the failure of humanity manifested in that war and its inevitable result in the "Rational State" that Scogan proposes.

== Adaptations ==
The story of Sir Hercules Lapith, who briefly turned Crome into a haven for dwarfs, was later adapted as a 60-minute radio play by Peter Mackie. This was first broadcast on BBC Radio 4 in 1986 and has been repeated since.

In 2014, the novelist Julian Davies wrote Crow Mellow, which he described as closely based on Aldous Huxley's novel. Set in contemporary Australia, it updates the satire to cover the hyper-capitalist 21st century in which the sex is more overt and art too has become a commodity.

Virginity, an American musical taking its start from Crome Yellow, has lyrics written by Germaine Shames, music and additional lyrics by Daniel M. Lincoln. In this the deaf Jenny is given the leading role.
