= Two or Three Graces and Other Stories =

1926 collection of short stories by Aldous Huxley

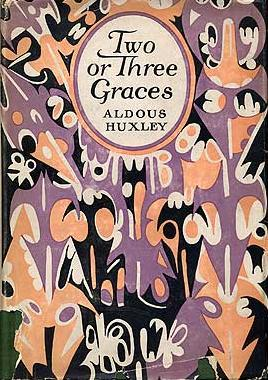
First US edition (publ. George H. Doran)

Two or Three Graces and Other Stories is the fourth collection of short fiction written by Aldous Huxley, published in 1926. The collection includes three short stories and a novella.

== Content ==
- "Two or Three Graces", novella
- "Half Holiday"
- "The Monocle"
- "Fairy Godmother"
