= Little Mexican and Other Stories =

1924 collection of short stories by Aldous Huxley

First edition (publ. Chatto & Windus)

Little Mexican and Other Stories (Young Archimedes in the United States) is the third collection of short fiction written by Aldous Huxley, published in 1924. The book consists of four short stories, a novelette and a novella.

== Content ==
- "Uncle Spencer", novella
- "Little Mexican"
- "Hubert and Minnie"
- "Fard"
- "The Portrait"
- "Young Archimedes", novelette

== Adaptations ==
Based on novelette "Young Archimedes":

- Prelude to Fame (1950), film directed by Fergus McDonell
- Il piccolo Archimede (1979), TV movie directed by Gianni Amelio
