= Brief Candles =

1930 collection of short stories by Aldous Huxley

- First Edition Cover
- Author: Aldous Huxley
- Language: English
- Publisher: Chatto & Windus
- Publication date: 1930
- Publication place: United Kingdom

Brief Candles is the fifth collection of short fiction written by Aldous Huxley, published in 1930. The book consists of three short stories and a novella.

Brief Candles takes its title from a line in William Shakespeare's Macbeth, from Macbeth's famous soliloquy:

Out, out, brief candle! Life's but a walking shadow, a poor player that struts and frets his hour upon the stage and then is heard no more: it is a tale told by an idiot, full of sound and fury, signifying nothing.

== Content ==
- "Chawdron"
- "The Rest Cure"
- "The Claxtons"
- "After the Fireworks", novella

== Adaptations ==
Based on short story "The Claxtons":

- The Holy Family (1994), short film directed by Ulrich Weis
