= Gianni Amelio =

Italian film director

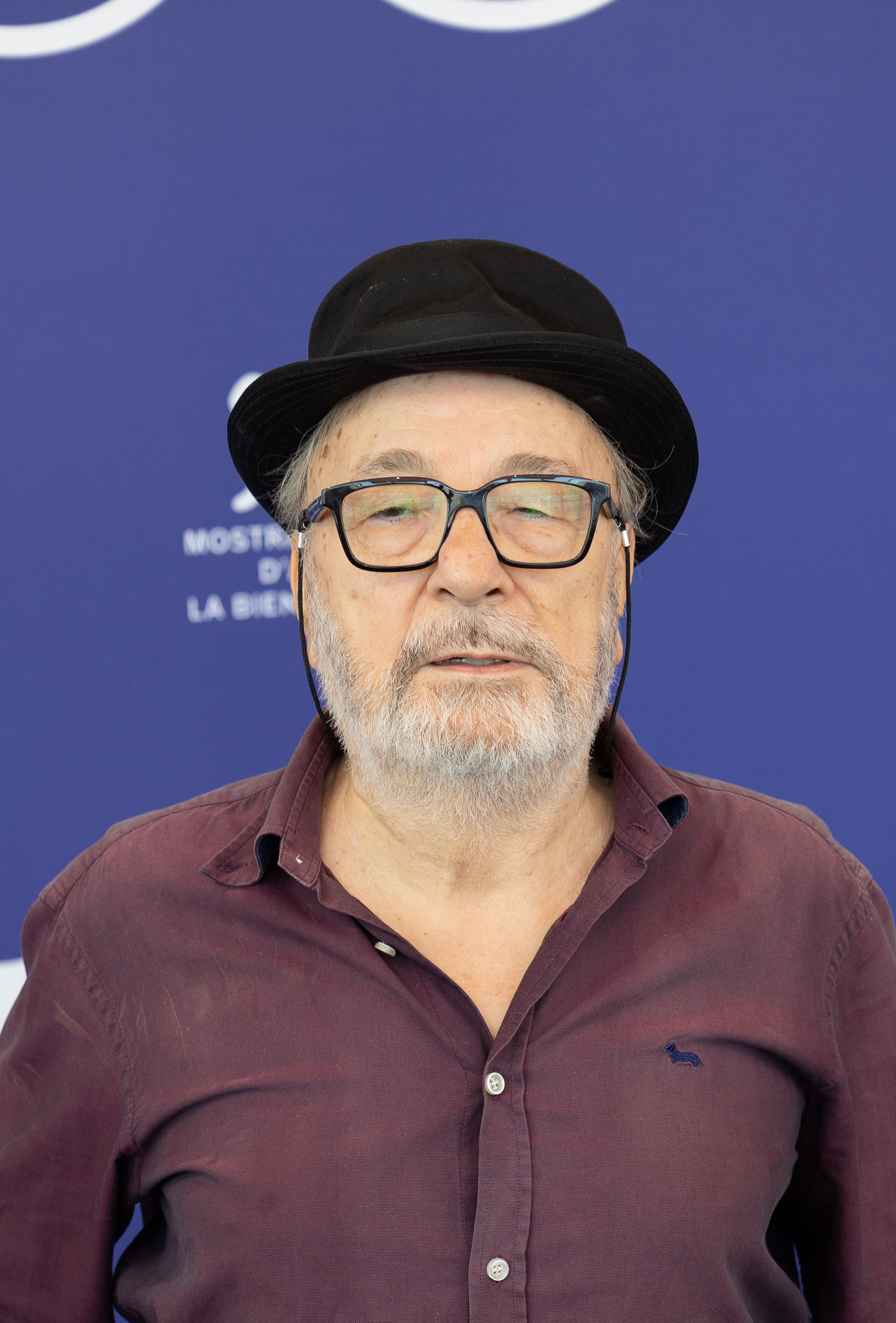
- Amelio in 2026
- Born: 20 January 1944 (age 82); San Pietro di Magisano, Catanzaro, Italy
- Occupation: Film director

Gianni Amelio (born 20 January 1944) is an Italian filmmaker who is best known for his Golden Lion-winning film The Way We Laughed (1998).

== Early life ==
Amelio was born in San Pietro di Magisano, province of Catanzaro, Calabria. His father moved to Argentina soon after his birth. He spent his youth and adolescence with his mother and his grandmother. The absence of a paternal figure would be a constant in Amelio's future works.

During his university studies of philosophy in Messina, Amelio got interested in cinema, writing as a film critic for a local magazine. In 1965, he moved to Rome, where he worked as operator and assistant director for figures such as Liliana Cavani and Vittorio De Seta. He also worked for television, directing documentaries and advertisements.

Amelio's first important work is the TV film La città del sole, directed in 1973 for RAI TV and inspired by Tommaso Campanella's work. This was followed by Bertolucci secondo il cinema (1976) a documentary about 1900 shooting, and the thriller Effetti speciali. Two years later, he directed the mystery La morte al lavoro, which won prizes at Locarno and Hyères festivals. The Little Archimedes (Il piccolo Archimede) of 1979 was also critically acclaimed.

In 1982, he debuted for cinema proper with Blow to the Heart (Colpire al cuore), about Italian terrorism, presented at the Venice Film Festival. In 1987, Amelio released I ragazzi di via Panisperna, about the lives of 1930 Italian physicists such as Enrico Fermi and Edoardo Amaldi, which won the award for best screenplay at the Bari Film Festival. 1989's Open Doors (Porte aperte), featuring Gian Maria Volonté, confirmed Amelio's status as one of Italy's best film directors and won a nomination as Best Foreign Film at the 1991 Academy Awards. The film also received four Felix, two Silver Ribbon, four David di Donatello and three Golden Globes awards.

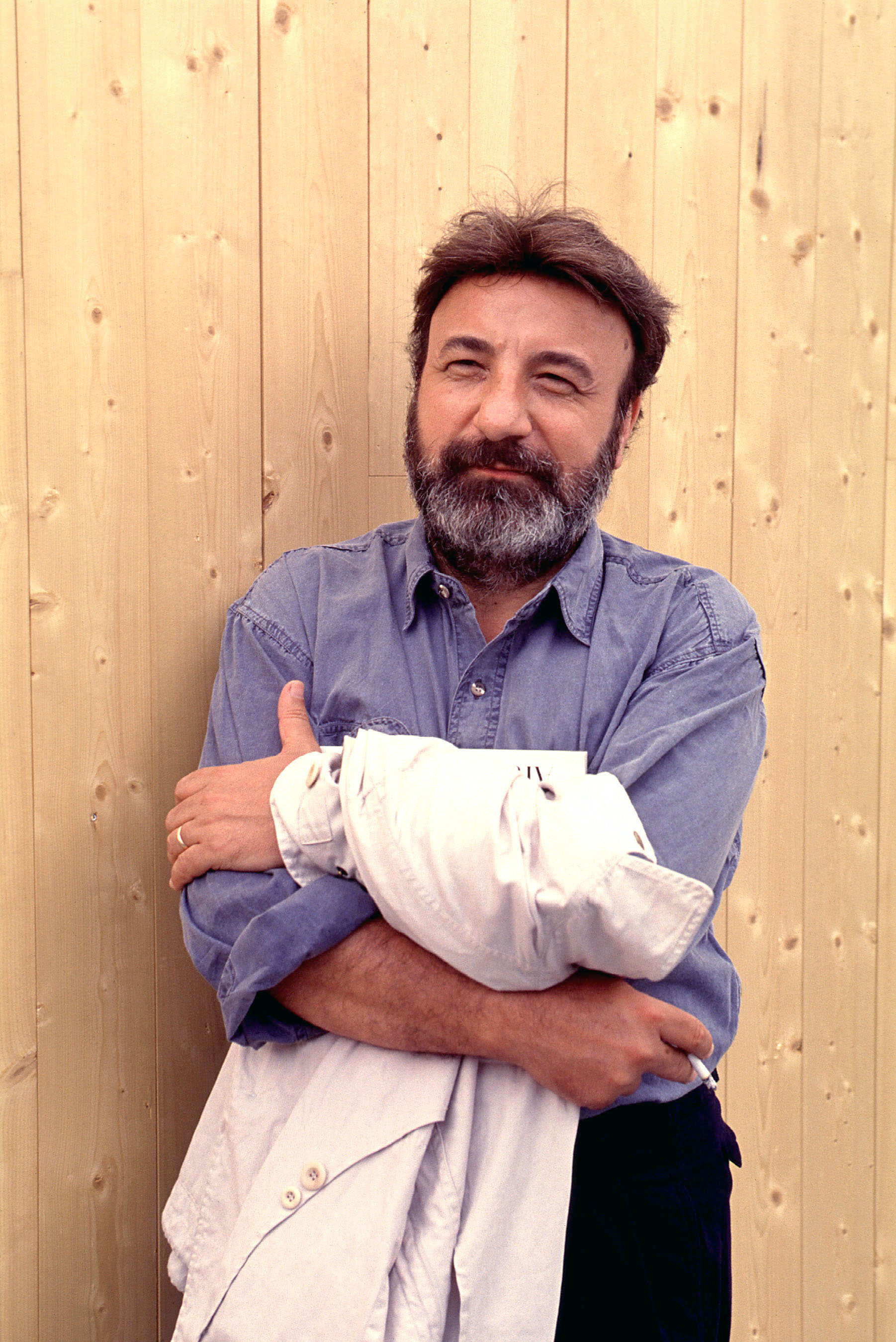
Amelio at the 49th Venice International Film Festival (1992)

Also successful was The Stolen Children (Il ladro di bambini) in 1992, which won the Special Prize of Jury at the 1992 Cannes Film Festival plus two Silver Ribbon and 5 David di Donatello. In 1994 Lamerica, about Albanian immigration in Italy, repeated the fate and the success, with 2 Silver Ribbons and 3 Davids. Four years later, The Way We Laughed (Così ridevano) won the Golden Lion at the Venice Film Festival. Amelio gained another Silver Ribbon as best director for The Keys to the House (Le chiavi di casa), inspired by a novel by Giuseppe Pontiggia, of 2004.

Amelio was a member of the jury at the Cannes Film Festival in 1995. In 2006, he released his eighth feature film, The Missing Star (La stella che non c'è), featuring Sergio Castellitto. From 2009 to 2012, he was director of Torino Film Festival, Turin.

Amelio came out as gay late in life, shortly before the release of his 2014 documentary Happy to be Different.

On 6 May 2026, Amelio received the Career David at the 71st David di Donatello ceremony in Rome.

== Filmography ==
Year	English Title	Original Title	Notes
1973	La città del sole		TV movie
1976	Bertolucci secondo il cinema		TV movie
1979	The Little Archimedes	Il piccolo Archimede	
1982	Blow to the Heart	Colpire al cuore	
1989	Via Panisperna Boys	I ragazzi di via Panisperna	
1990	Open Doors	Porte aperte	
1992	The Stolen Children	Il ladro di bambini	
1994	Lamerica		
1998	The Way We Laughed	Così ridevano	
2004	The Keys to the House	Le chiavi di casa	
2006	The Missing Star	La stella che non c'è	
2011	The First Man	Il primo uomo	
2013	L'intrepido		
2014	Happy to Be Different	Felice chi è diverso	Documentary
2017	Tenderness	La tenerezza	
2020	Hammamet		
2022	Lord of the Ants	Il signore delle formiche	
2024	Battlefield	Campo di battaglia	
2026	No Pain	Nessun dolore	

== Accolades ==
- Nastro d'Argento: Best Director
  - Open Doors (1991)
  - The Stolen Children (1993)
  - Lamerica (1995)
  - The Keys to the House (2005)
- Golden Osella at Venice Film Festival
  - Lamerica (1995)
- Leone d'oro at Venice Film Festival
  - The Way We Laughed (1998)
- European Film Awards: Best Film
  - Open Doors (1991)
  - The Stolen Children (1993)
  - Lamerica (1995)
- David di Donatello: Career David (2026)

== Bibliography ==
- Academic article on Lamerica, see link: https://www.academia.edu/3379912/Inside_the_Beasts_Cage_Gianni_Amelios_Lamerica_and_the_Dilemmas_of_Post-1989_Leftist_Cinema.
- Raccontare i sentimenti. Il Cinema di Gianni Amelio, a cura di Sebastiano Gesù, Giuseppe Maimone Editore, Catania 2008. ISBN 978-88-7751-274-1.
