= Jean Rhys: The Collected Short Stories =

- First edition
- Author: Jean Rhys
- Publisher: W. W. Norton & Company
- Publication date: 1987
- Media type: Print (hardback)
- Pages: 403
- ISBN: 978-0393023756
- OCLC: 17966455.

Jean Rhys: The Collected Short Stories is a volume of the complete short fiction of Jean Rhys published in 1987 by W. W. Norton & Company. The collection includes an Introduction by Diana Athill. The last three stories in the volume are previously uncollected.

== Contents ==
The Selected Short Stories comprises all of the fiction from the collections The Left Bank and Other Stories (1927), Tigers Are Better-Looking (1968), and Sleep It Off Lady (1976). In addition, the volume includes two works published in Penguin Modern Stories (1969): "I Spy a Stranger" and "Temps Perdi", and two stories first published in Vogue, "Kismet" and "Invitation to the Dance". "The Whistling Bird" was published in The New Yorker in September 1978.

Introduction by Diana Athill

- "Illusion"
- "A Spiritualist"
- "From A French Prison"
- "In a Café"
- "Tout Montparnasse and a Lady"
- "Mannequin"
- "In the Luxembourg Gardens"
- "Tea with an Artist"
- "Trio"
- "Mixing Cocktails"
- "Again the Antilles"
- "Hunger"
- "Discourse of a Lady Standing a Dinner to a Down-and-Out Friend"
- "A Night"
- "In the Rue de l'Arivée"
- "Learning to be a Mother"
- "The Blue Bird"
- "The Grey Day"
- "The Sidi"
- "At The Villa d'Or"
- "La Grosse Fifi"
- "Vienne"
- "Till September Petronella"
- "The Day they Burned the Books"
- "Let Them Call It Jazz"
- "Tigers are Better-Looking"
- "Outside the Machine"
- "The Lotus"
- "A Solid House"
- "The Sound of the River"
- "I Spy a Stranger"
- "Temps Perdi"
- "Pioneers, Oh, Pioneers"
- "Goodbye Marcus, Goodbye Rose"
- "The Bishop's Feast"
- "Heat"
- "Fishy Waters"
- "Overture and Beginners Please"
- "Before the Deluge"
- "On Not Shooting Sitting Birds"
- "Kikimora"
- "Night Out 1925"
- "The Chevalier of the Place Blanche"
- "The Insect World"
- "Repunzel, Repunzel"
- "Who Knows What's up in the Attic?"
- "Sleep It Off Lady"
- "I Used to Live Here Once"
- "Kismet"
- "The Whistling Bird"
- "Invitation to the Dance"

== Reception ==
Kirkus Reviews welcomed The Collected Short Stories as a comprehensive offering of Rhys's short fiction. The reviewer is especially impressed with the debut work "Kismet". The "fragile, rococo lives of her lonely, dispossessed, and not-so-young women are devastating to behold".

Publishers Weekly describes the stories as "subtly expressive, producing realistic portraits of women who refuse to accept the responsibilities of adulthood and suffer, in puzzlement, the inevitable consequences" and assures "devotees" of Rhys's work they will not be disappointed.

== Sources ==
- Malcolm, Cheryl Alexander and Malcolm, David. 1996. Jean Rhys: A Study of the Short Fiction. Twayne Publishers, Simon & Schuster, New York. ISBN 0-8057-0855-3
- Rhys, Jean. 1987. Jean Rhys: The Collected Short Stories. W. W. Norton & Company, New York, London. ISBN 0-393-30625-9
