= Jean Rhys: Letters 1931–1966 =

Posthumous compilation of author Jean Rhys's letters

Jean Rhys: Letters 19311966
- First edition
- Author: Jean Rhys, edited by Francis Wyndham (writer) and Diana Melly
- Language: English
- Genre: Correspondence
- Publisher: André Deutsch, Penguin Books
- Publication place: England
- English publication date: 1984
- Media type: Print (Hardback)
- Pages: 320
- ISBN: 0-233-97567-5
- OCLC: 12555409

Jean Rhys: Letters 1931–1966 is a posthumous compilation of author Jean Rhys's letters, first published in 1984 by André Deutsch and from 1985 by Penguin Books.

The letters were selected and edited by Diana Melly (wife of George Melly and close friend of Jean Rhys) with Francis Wyndham, who had helped revive Rhys's writing career late in her life. Presented in chronological order, they span the period from 1931, where Rhys's Smile Please: An Unfinished Autobiography ends, to 1966, when she completed her last novel Wide Sargasso Sea.

Besides detailing events and relationships, the letters reveal Rhys's process of literary creation, as she discusses with correspondents various works in progress.

== Conception ==
In the book's introduction, Francis Wyndham explains that Jean Rhys had requested in her will that no biography be written unless authorized during her lifetime. Her wish stemmed from inaccuracies she had read in biographies of people she knew, combined with the confusion she foresaw in biographers misreading her autobiographical-style fiction as fact. She had therefore chosen to set down the facts of her life in an autobiography. However, as Rhys had not completed Smile Please: An Unfinished Autobiography (1979) when she died, an information a gap was left where she could have kept writing.

(In a 1970 Transatlantic Review interview Rhys confirmed having started her autobiography Smile Please. In a 1978 New York Times interview with Nan Robertson, she regretted Smile Please losing momentum after shelving it to prioritise her 1976 short story collection Sleep It Off Lady.)

After her death in 1979 Wyndham, as her literary executor, was approached with requests for permission to write her "official" life. Reluctant to betray Rhys's instructions but recognising the interest in her life, he decided that "unassailably authentic" biographical material could instead be compiled and presented in the form of a volume of her letters.

== Notable recipients ==
Recipients of Rhys's letters include:

- Diana Athill
- Morchard Bishop
- Olwyn Hughes
- John Lehmann
- Charles Osborne
- Evelyn Scott
- Selma Vaz Dias
- Francis Wyndham

== Book contents ==
Wyndham's introduction precedes a summary of events in Jean Rhys's life, then a brief publishing history.

Comprising 320 pages, the book is divided into six sections:

- Part One: Leslie (1931–1945)

Leslie Tilden-Smith was Rhys's literary agent from 1928 and second husband from 1934 until his death in 1945.

- Part Two: Max (1946–1950)

Max Hamer was Tilden-Smith's cousin and Rhys's third husband after Tilden-Smith's death, until Hamer's death in 1966.

- Part Three: Maryvonne (1951–1956)

Maryvonne Moerman (née Lenglet) was Rhys's daughter by her first husband, Jean Lenglet.

- Part Four: Selma (1956–1960)

Selma Vaz Dias was an actress who placed a notice in the New Statesman in 1949, during Rhys's period of obscurity, enquiring about her whereabouts (seeking permission to dramatize her 1939 novel Good Morning, Midnight).

- Part Five: Cheriton Fitz Paine (1960–1963)

Cheriton Fitzpaine is the village in Devon, England, where Jean Rhys lived for her last nineteen years, with Max Hamer and after his death, slowly completing her final novel Wide Sargasso Sea.

- Part Six: Wide Sargasso Sea (1964–1966)

Wide Sargasso Sea (1966) renewed Rhys's literary career and brought her global acclaim.

The book ends with a general index followed by an index of correspondents.

== Reception ==
The book was generally well received, with Kirkus Reviews noting that "While casual Rhys fans will find this collection disappointingly monotonic (and surprisingly domestic), specialists will welcome the informal record here (with fine editorial annotation) of Rhys' anguished writing process—especially the long, frustrating evolution of Wide Sargasso Sea."

Carole Angier stated in the London Review of Books: "She wrote great novels against great odds. And if in one or two of those a note of self-pity crept in, it does not here. Her voice in these wonderful letters is made up of courage, hard work, and that ‘astringent note’ of hers, unique, hard-won and very moving."

In The New York Times, Vivian Gornick called the book "A record of actual experience that both traces the artist's obsession to its biographical source and substantiates the claim: It isn't autobiography, it's imagination,'' and added "these letters are marvellous, comprehensive and masterly, the pen held by one whose working authority is beyond question."

== Selected letters: excerpts ==
I’m awfully jealous of this place (as you gather no doubt). I can’t imagine anybody writing about it, daring to, without loving it—or living here twenty years, or being born here. And anyway I don’t want strangers to love it except very few whom I’d choose—most sentimental. (But they are a bit patronizing you know.) However I’ve an idea that what with the rain, cockroaches, and bad roads etc. Dominica will protect itself from vulgar loves. —Letter to Evelyn Scott, 1936

I think I have had little success because I did not want it. Not in that way. Not really. Even now I cannot connect money or publicity with writing, though I adore money and need it badly, very. For me, these things are different—and opposed. Bitterly. I can only write for love as it were. I did once try to produce a story for the Saturday Evening Post for I was advised to do this. Well I made it all glitter and de luxe and so on but in the end I could not stop myself from letting the sad mousey companion steal all the jewels and the lover too. And get away(italics) with this antisocial act. I did leave the lovely mondaine with the other jewels, and the second best lover. But still! It doesn’t do. I tore this thing up on which I’d spent months of anxious care, plus research, and have never tried again. —Letter to Francis Wyndham, 14 September 1959.

== Sources ==
- Rhys, Jean. 1984. Letters, 1931-1966. Selected and edited by Francis Wyndham and Diana Melly. André Deutsch, publisher. ISBN 978-0233975672
