= Mannequin (short story) =

- Short story by Jean Rhys

Publication
- Publisher: Jonathan Cape, Harper & Brothers
- Media type: The Left Bank and Other Stories
- Publication date: 1927

“Mannequin” is a work of short fiction by Jean Rhys first published in her 1927 collection The Left Bank and Other Stories published by Jonathan Cape (London) and Harper & Brothers (New York).

The story is included in the 1987 volume Jean Rhys: The Collected Short Stories by W. W. Norton & Co..

== Plot ==
“Mannequin” is told by a limited-omnicient narrator. The story is set in Paris during the teens or 1920s. Anna, the focal character, is an impoverished young woman desperate to find a job. When the story opens she has just been engaged to model clothing for an upscale fashion house, “Madame Veron’s.” As a novice, she is paid the lowest of wages. Her petite, child-like physique determines that she will model “jeune fille” apparel.

European and American clothing outlets are placing their spring orders for the latest styles; Anna is paraded in front of an American buyer and performs well. At noon, she is directed to join the other models for lunch; the labyrinth of stairs and corridors bewilder her before she manages to find the dining hall to join them.

Each of Madame Veron’s veteran mannequins have cultivated a distinctive style representing a female social type: Babette is the blonde gamine; Mona the haughty femme fatale; Georgette the sportive garçonne; Simome a green-eyed, feline seductress; and the statuesque Elaine, is the highest paid of the mannequins. Anna’s is that of the jeune fille, an innocent, vulnerable girl. Madame Pecard, the dresser, ostensibly presides over the gathering—and is ignored by the models (they consider her a snitch). The workers of the lower order are seated at other tables—saleswomen and sewing girls. Anna is exhausted by the end of her first day; she doubts that she can further endure the confined atmosphere of the salon. A friendly saleswoman assures her that Madame Vernon is pleased with her.

That evening Anna emerges from the salon onto the rue de la Paix. Passing other mannequins along the boulevard she exults in a new sense of belonging to Paris.

== Narrator and narration ==
Rhys displays her narrative approach in transitioning from a third-person limited omniscience point-of-view to that of “detached observer” in the following passage

At six o’clock Anna was in the rue de la Paix; her fatigue forgotten, the feeling that now she really belonged to the great maddening city possessed her and she was happy in her beautifully cut tailor-made and beret.

Georgette passed her and smiled; Babette was in a fur coat.

All up the street the mannequins were coming out of the shops, pausing on the pavement for a moment, making them as gay and as beautiful as beds of flowers before they walked swiftly away and the Paris night swallowed them up.

== Theme ==
Three stories from The Left Bank: “ Illusion,” “Mannequin,” and “La Grosse Fifi,” “set out the centrality of the outsider figure in Rhys’s short stories and the complexity with which she deals with such figures and their possibilities for escaping a crushing social and sexual alienation.”

Anna is wearing a black dress, a distinguishing “trademark” of Rhys’s petite femmes in all her fiction, when we first encounter the protagonist as she arrives for work at Madame Veron’s modelling studio.

Anna, dressed in the black cotton, chemise-like garment of the mannequin off duty was trying to find her way along dark passages and down complicated flights of stairs to the underground from where lunch was served. She was shivering, for she had forgotten her coat, and the garment that she wore was very short, sleeveless, displaying her rose-coloured stockings to the knee. Her hair was flamingly and honestly red; her eyes, which were gentle in expression, brown and heavily shadowed with kohl, her face small and pale under its professional rouge. She was fragile, like a delicate child, her arms pathetically thin. It was to her legs she owned this dazzling, this incredible opportunity.

Anna, one of Rhys’s literary, and perhaps autobiographical “petite femmes,” fares well in this tale of this fashion model in 1920s Paris.

Anna, despite her diminutive and delicate physique (she models the jeune fille fashions), she survives her initiation into the modelling world and is adopted by her female compatriots.

Biographers Cheryl and David Malcolm write:

“Mannequin” is less about escape than belonging, and this makes it a stand out in Rhys’s fiction. Anna finds a place, finds companions, and finds a role. At the end of the story, however temporarily, she belongs and stops being an outsider.

=== Allegory: Alice in Wonderland ===
Critics Malcolm and Malcolm detect an atmosphere and setting reminiscent of Lewis Carol’s Alice’s Adventures in Wonderland (1865). Like Alice’s tumble down the rabbit hole, Anna descends into the bowels of the fashion house encountering “countless puzzling corridors and staircases, a rabbit warren and a labyrinth” to arrive at the subterranean lunch room.

She pushed open a door. She was in a big, very low ceilinged room, all the floor space occupied by long wooden tables with no cloths…she was sitting at the mannequin’s table, gazing at a thick and hideous white china plate, a twisted tin fork, wooden-handled stained knife, a tumbler so thick it seemed unbreakable.

Anna observes Madame Pecard, the dresser, seated at the head of the table attempting to preside over the luncheon like a Mad Hatter; absurdities abound. When Pecard announces that smoking is prohibited, the assembled mannequins at once light up cigarettes.

== Sources ==
- Angier, Carole. 1990. Jean Rhys: Life and Work. Little, Brown and Company, Boston, Toronto, London. ISBN 0-316-04263-3
- Harris, Laurel. 2021. "Impassagenwerk: Jean Rhys's Interwar Fiction and the Modernist Impasse." Journal of Modern Literature , Spring 2021, Vol. 44, No. 3 (Spring 2021), pp. 19-34. Indiana University Press. https://www.jstor.org/stable/10.2979/jmodelite.44.3.02 Accessed 10 January, 2026.
- Malcolm, Cheryl Alexander and Malcolm, David. 1996. Jean Rhys: A Study of the Short Fiction. Twayne Publishers, Simon & Schuster, New York. ISBN 0-8057-0855-3
- Rhys, Jean. 1987. Jean Rhys: The Collected Short Stories. W. W. Norton & Company, New York, London. ISBN 0-393-30625-9
