= Pioneers, Oh, Pioneers =

"“Pioneers, Oh, Pioneers”"
- Short story by Jean Rhys

Publication
- Publisher: André Deutsch
- Publication date: 1976

“Pioneers, Oh, Pioneers” is a work of short fiction by Jean Rhys originally appearing in The Times and first collected in Sleep It Off Lady (1976) by André Deutsch.

== Plot ==
“Pioneers, Oh, Pioneers” presents a third-person omniscient narrative. The story is set on a small, unnamed West Indian island at the end of the 19th century. The central portion of the tale is related by a detached narrator, Rosalie.

The narrative opens shortly after a young white landowner, a Mr. Ramage, has died. The local physician and medical examiner Dr. Cox, along with the police, have found him dead of a self-inflicted gun shot at his estate. The story of Mr. Ramage is told in flashback. Ramage had arrived on the island to find “peace” according to his acquaintance Dr. Cox. A tall, strikingly good-looking Englishman, he had made an excellent impression on both the white colonial residents, as well as the native population of indigenous African descent. Dr. Cox's 11-year-old daughter, Rosalie, develops a crush on him.

Ramage purchases the lovely Spanish Castle, one of a number of derelict plantation properties; remote from town; he seeks solitude there.

At first perceived as a potential asset to the white community, Ramage becomes increasingly anti-social. He gains a reputation as a “strange man…very reserved.” When news is circulated that Ramage has married a girl of mixed European-African heritage, Isla Harrison, the white community is outraged; moreover, the young woman is said to have a bad reputation—not a “nice coloured girl”. Dr. Cox visits Spanish Castle and finds Ramage surprisingly sociable. They drink punch on the veranda; when Mrs. Ramage appears, she presents herself haughtily as mistress of the plantation, dressed in finery and drenched in cheap perfume. Disgusted, Cox departs. The Ramages subsequently fade from the awareness of the community; seasons pass.

Ramage resurfaces suddenly at the Twickenham estate which adjoins his own. He emerges from the woods and encounters the owners, Mr. and Mrs. Eliot. Ramage is stark naked, except for a cutlass he bears on a leather belt. His hair is shoulder length, his beard to his chest. He makes a disparaging remark to Mrs. Eliot, then withdraws, making no apology. The couple is outraged. The details of the incident are widely repeated.

Dr. Cox visits Spanish Castle and finds Ramage well-dressed and looking healthy, his hair and beard trimmed. When Cox confronts him with the Eliot incident, Ramage apologizes and dismisses it as a mere misunderstanding. Mrs. Ramage does not make an appearance. Cox returns home and assures his wife that all is well at Spanish Castle; she in turn tells him that Mrs. Ramage has been missing for weeks. The police have been notified. An editorial in the local gazette gives credence to rumors about a young gentleman who styles himself “the king of the cannibal islands.” Cox, who considers Ramage a victim of “mischief-makers” sends a letter urging him to take legal action to defend his reputation; Cox receives no response.

Soon afterward Cox learns that a riot has occurred at Spanish Castle: a crowd of native men and boys had gathered at night throwing stones and shouting “white zombie” at Ramage as he stood on his veranda. When Ramage is said to have brandished a shotgun, the mob scatters and several people are hurt in the panic. The authorities feel compelled to take action; the Chief of Police, several officers, and Dr. Cox visit the estate to make inquiries—they find Mr. Ramage dead of a gunshot. Whether a case of suicide or an accident is unclear.

Ramage's funeral is well-attended by the locals. Mrs. Ramage appears; she had been visiting relatives during the past months. Public opinion turns against the deceased man; many consider his passing a blessing. Only Rosalie mourns his death. She writes a letter of farewell to the dead man to place on his grave; her mother discovers the missive and destroys it.

== Background ==
Rhys based the narrative on a former friend of her father, a Mr. Ramage, for whom she wrote several drafts over decades since her return from Dominica in 1936. Rhys was intrigued by events concerning the Englishman's “mysterious death at his isolated home.”

Rhys wrote the version published in 1956 while living in Bude, Cornwall. The narrative may have been intended as a novel before she edited it into a short story.

== Theme ==
Whereas the typical role that Rhys assigns to her male characters is that of oppressor, here she casts the protagonist, Mr. Ramage, as a tragic figure, “indisputably a victim and a powerless outsider.” Indeed, Mr. Ramage's withdrawal from society, “rather than diminishing his victim status, makes him an especially tragic figure…”

Rhys presents a paradox, in that a figure associated with “traditional male power and authority” is destroyed rather than empowered by the class and race antagonisms.

Mr. Ramage prefigures Rhys's Mr. Rochester in her 1966 novel Wide Sargasso Sea.

=== The Ramage-Eliot incident ===
Critics Cheryl and David Malcolm identify the confrontation between Ramage and the Eliots as a key thematic moment; Ramage's outsider status on the island is irreversibly established. Mr. and Mrs. Eliot, owners of the Twickenham estate adjacent to Spanish Castle, are confronted by Mr. Ramage:

They looked up and saw Ramage coming out from under the trees. He was burnt a deep brown, his hair fell to his shoulders, his beard to his chest. He was wearing sandals and a leather belt, on one side of which hung a cutlass, on the other a large pouch. Nothing else.

When Mrs. Eliot “with admirable sang froid” offers the nude Ramage tea; he declines, apologizes and withdraws in the manner of a fully-dressed gentleman who has offended his host. The incident reveals how culturally disoriented Ramage has become: Though perceived as having “gone native,” by white colonists, no self-respecting black islander would “wander around naked.” Malcolm and Malcolm point out that Ramage is identifying with out-dated Eurocentric notions of the noble savage, not the realities of contemporary black Caribbean communities.

When Ramage marries a young colored woman, he is regarded as “lost to white society.” Neither will the black populace tolerate him. Ramage's anti-social behavior condemns him to utter isolation; moreover, his eccentricities, as well as the disappearance of his native wife, provoke rumors and hostility. The peace he seeks he attains only by taking his own life.

== Sources ==
- Angier, Carole. 1990. Jean Rhys: Life and Work. Little, Brown and Company, Boston, Toronto, London. ISBN 0-316-04263-3
- James, Louis. 2003. “The Other Side of the Mirror: The Short Stories of Jean Rhys and Olive Senior.” Journal of Caribbean Literatures, Summer 2003, Vol. 3, No. 3, pp. 193–198 Published by: Maurice Lee Stable https://www.jstor.org/stable/40986159 Accessed 10 February 2026.
- Malcolm, Cheryl Alexander and Malcolm, David. 1996. Jean Rhys: A Study of the Short Fiction. Twayne Publishers, Simon & Schuster, New York. ISBN 0-8057-0855-3
- Rhys, Jean. 1987. Jean Rhys: The Collected Short Stories. W. W. Norton & Company, New York, London. ISBN 0-393-30625-9
- Seymour, Miranda. I Used To Live Here Once: The Haunted Life of Jean Rhys. W. W. Norton & Company, New York. ISBN 978-1-324-00612-1
