= Heat (Rhys short story) =

"“Heat”"
- Short story by Jean Rhys

Publication
- Publisher: The New Yorker
- Media type: Magazine
- Publication date: May 10, 1976

“Heat” is a work of short fiction by Jean Rhys originally published in The New Yorker (May 10, 1976) and first collected in Sleep It Off Lady (1976) by André Deutsch (London).

== Plot ==
“Heat” is written from a first-person point-of-view by a reliable narrator. The events described in the story concern the 1902 eruption of Mt. Pelée. Jean Rhys was 12-years-old and living on the island of Dominica at the time; the story contains autobiographical elements.

The unidentified adult narrator relates the natural disaster filtered through her childhood memories and perceptions. The story opens with the aftermath of the first eruption, in which portions of Dominica, south of the island of Martinique, are covered in “two feet” of volcanic ash. The community is anxious; they have no way of knowing what has actually occurred. Is Dominica’s volcano, Boiling Lake, about to erupt? The site is known to emit poisonous gases.

The narrator shares childhood memories of the death of a young English visitor who had explored the Boiling Lake with two local guides. One guide, acting as scout, had suddenly collapsed; the other urged the Englishman to flee; rather, the Englishman went back to the aid of the fallen guide and inhaled the deadly fumes. A monument was erected in his memory not far from the grave of the narrator’s younger sister.

That night of the initial pyrotechnics on Martinique, her mother had awakened her and led her to a window: in the distance was an immense ash cloud flaming over the island. She intoned “You will never see anything like this in your life again.”

The next day the news finally arrived by boat as to what occurred. The eruption of Mt .Pelée had leveled the town of [[Saint-Pierre], Martinique]], killing a reported 30,000 inhabitants. The narrator’s father sailed to Martinique to witness the devastation. He returned with a souvenir—a set of brass candle-holders, grotesquely deformed by the inferno which he suspended from the ceiling as a relic.

In the aftermath of the tragedy, stories began to circulate locally about the reasons for Saint-Pierre’s terrible fate. Residents of Dominica characterized it as a wicked city, having boasted an opera house and a theatre. Indeed, Paris troupes performed there. Both single and married women of the town were said to have signaled their availability for sexual liaisons by tying their turbans and kerchiefs in peculiar configurations. The last Catholic bishop to visit the city was said to have registered his disgust with these practices.

Emerging from her childhood recollections, the narrator attempts to document the historic Saint Pierre; she locates only old newspapers that have nothing to report about operas, theaters, or the character of the town’s inhabitants. Rather, she discovers that one man was known to have survived, “the only one out of 40,000.” A convice, imprisoned in a deep underground cell, survived with injuries. Music-hall entrepreneurs enlisted and groomed the man to perform in music-halls around the world as a novelty.

They had taught him a little speech. He must be quite a rich man—what did he do with his money? Would he marry again? His wife and children had been killed in the eruption…I read all this, then I thought that it wasn’t like that, it wasn’t like that at all.

== Historical background ==
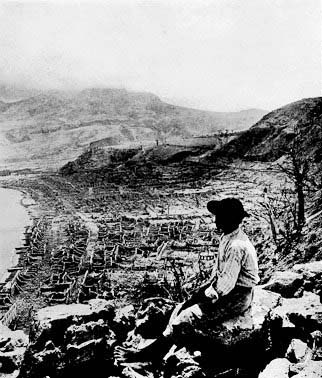
Remains of Saint-Pierre

The story provides autobiographical accounts of several historic events related to Dominica, where Rhys was born and raised: The 1902 eruption of Mount Pelée, the destruction of Saint-Pierre, Martinique and its 28,000 inhabitants, and the incarcerated Ludger Sylbaris, one of only two or three survivors of the catastrophe. The narrative is filtered through Rhys’s childhood perceptions of the events that include local myths and misinformation.

“Heat” also makes reference to the death of the Englishman, age “twenty-seven,” who succumbed to sulphur fumes while visiting a local volcanic attraction, Boiling Lake. Rhys provides the words inscribed on the marble memorial to the victim as remembered by her 12-year-old self:

Sacred to the memory of Clive—who lost his life at the boiling lake in Dominica in a heroic attempt to save his guide.

=== Brenda Gwentih: disputed birth order ===
In “Heat,” Rhys made reference to her deceased younger sister, Brenda Gwenith who died in infancy (Not to be confused with sister Brenda Clarice, who survived to adulthood). Rhys made no other reference to Brenda Gwenisth in any of her literature. Lacking birth and death records (destroyed in a fire), the birth order of the girl has been disputed.

According to biographer Carole Angier, Brenda Gwenith was born in early 1889, before Rhys’s birth in August 1890. Owen, an older brother, had later in life reported that around November of 1889, both Brenda Gwenith and her older sister, Minna (not to be confused with their mother), were sickened in a dysentery epidemic. Brenda Gwenith was near death, but survived, according to Owen’s account. Angier disputes this, surmising that Brenda died in the 1889 epidemic. This would establish Brenda Gwenith as Rhys’s older sister.

Biographer Melinda Seymour reports that “there is a dispute about whether it was a slightly older or younger sister who died” relative to Rhys’s age. Seymour offers a different birth order for Brenda Gwenith. Rhys, in her “unabashedly autobiographical” story, refers to her deceased sibling as “my little sister.” In a personal communication to biographer David Plante, Rhys wrote in 1987:

My mother had…two sons first, whom she really liked then, then a daughter, then me, and after me a little daughter that died…

Seymour believes this testimony establishes Brenda Gwenith as a younger sister whose grave Rhys visited frequently at the Anglican Cemetery where the Boiling Lake victim was also interred.

== Sources ==
- Angier, Carole. 1990. Jean Rhys: Life and Work. Little, Brown and Company, Boston, Toronto, London. ISBN 0-316-04263-3
- Malcolm, Cheryl Alexander and Malcolm, David. 1996. Jean Rhys: A Study of the Short Fiction. Twayne Publishers, Simon & Schuster, New York. ISBN 0-8057-0855-3
- Rhys, Jean. 1987. Jean Rhys: The Collected Short Stories. W. W. Norton & Company, New York, London. ISBN 0-393-30625-9
- Seymour, Miranda. I Used To Live Here Once: The Haunted Life of Jean Rhys. W. W. Norton & Company, New York. ISBN 978-1-324-00612-1
