= After Leaving Mr. Mackenzie =

1931 novel by Jean Rhys

- First edition
- Author: Jean Rhys
- Language: English
- Publisher: Jonathan Cape
- Publication date: 1931
- Publication place: United Kingdom
- Media type: Print (hardback)

After Leaving Mr. Mackenzie is a 1931 novel by Jean Rhys that was originally published by Jonathan Cape. Set in interwar Paris and London, the novel is autobiographical fiction and thematically sequential to Rhys's debut novel Quartet (1928). As Quartet explored Marya Zelli's relationship and breakup, this novel tracks Julia Martin's post-breakup months when her ex-lover's allowance cheques stop.

The Rhys heroine's age and social descent progress here from Quartet, reaching completion in Good Morning, Midnight (1939). The third-person narrative switches between more character viewpoints than in other early Rhys novels. The protagonist is Julia Martin, Rhys's fictional counterpart. Julia's three romantic figures Rhys calls "Mr" (Mr Mackenzie, Mr Horsfield and Mr James).

The title is a reversal of premise: Mr Mackenzie has left Julia Martin rather than vice versa. Themes include the lot of the outsider, the plight of the underdog, rich versus poor, female alienation, loneliness, destitution, death, grief, nostalgia for childhood and the quest for love. The novel is in three parts, each subdivided into numbered, titled chapters.

== Plot ==
Part One

From her hotel on the Quai des Grands-Augustins, Julia Martin inhabits Rive Gauche Paris, lunching alone in a German restaurant in the rue de la Huchette, drinking Pernod, wine and other alcohols. Locked in her room, she reads most of the time.

Though attractive at thirty-six, she feels past her prime, fatigued and fatalistic. After a failed early marriage roaming Europe and the death of a baby, she had drifted to Paris during the Années folles. She has survived for six months on 300 francs a week from ex-lover Mr Mackenzie, posted each Tuesday by high-handed solicitor Henri Legros. One Tuesday Maître Legros writes informing Julia he is instructed to terminate the allowance, enclosing final payment of 1,500 francs. That evening she follows Mr Mackenzie down the Boulevard du Montparnasse to Restaurant Albert. She sits at his table, pours herself wine from his carafe and confronts him. She ends saying she doesn't want his severance cheque, slaps him lightly around the face with her glove and walks out.

From a nearby table, Englishman George Horsfield has watched the incident. When Julia exits, Mr Horsfield follows and befriends her, buys her a drink in another café and takes her to a cinema. Afterwards, seeing her cry, the awkward Mr Horsfield invites her to his hotel to talk. He pours whiskey and she describes fragments of her life since leaving London the February after the 1918 armistice a decade or so earlier. When Mr Horsfield asks if she is stuck for money, she takes from her purse two ten franc notes and some coins, saying that is all she has. She recounts to him her rejection of Mr Mackenzie's severance cheque (which Mr Horsfield had witnessed in Restaurant Albert). Mr Horsfield gives her another 1,500 francs, suggests she visit London and jots down his address there.

Part Two

In London, Julia books into at a drab Bloomsbury hotel. The first morning, she walks aimlessly, reminiscing. In Woburn Square, a familiar old flower-seller man ignores her when she buys his violets. On Tottenham Court Road, she envisages a ghost of her younger self emerge from the fog. She crosses Oxford Street into Charing Cross Road, gets lost in Soho and stops at a Lyons tea shop, overhearing patrons chatter while a band plays military music.

Reunions with her dour Uncle Griffiths and disapproving sister Norah are tense. At his Bayswater boarding house, Uncle Griffiths says that she should have secured a settlement from her ex-husband, prior to Mr Mackenzie. He gives her a pound note but wants little more contact. Living in Acton, Norah has devoted her life to their sick mother, now dying, so is unsympathetic to Julia's plight. Their mother dies during Julia's London visit. Julia attends the funeral at Golders Green Crematorium, causes a scene at the wake and is asked to leave.

She looks up W. Neil James Esq, her rich and generous first love from when she was age nineteen. Ushered into his study, Julia sees Mr James is different. He says he has forty-five minutes. She hints at hardship, but to him this is an old story. He asks to change the subject, looks at the clock, shows her his art collection and sees her out. He posts her twenty pounds, stressing there can be no more. Some of it she spends on new clothes, some on second hand ones. She moves to a boarding house in cheaper Notting Hill.

Mr Horsfield, also back in London, takes her for outings, meals and drinks, but withdraws his support as his interest in the troubled Julia wanes. Retreating to his Holland Park house, he promises to visit her in Paris in a week or ten days.

Part Three

Julia is back in her cheap Paris hotel on the Quai des Grands-Augustins, overlooking the Île de la Cité. On the eleventh day, she receives a letter from Mr Horsfield explaining that he is unable to visit as soon as he had hoped. Enclosing ten pounds, he writes he cannot send more as times are hard. He closes by wishing her the best of luck.

In the late afternoon, from inside a café on the rue Dauphine, Mr Mackenzie notices Julia approach on the street. He shields his face so as not to be seen, but she sees him anyway, looks away and passes aimlessly with her head down. Having second thoughts, he leaves and catches up with her at a kerb where she waits to cross. He invites her for a drink, takes her to a café and buys her a Pernod. She drinks it quickly and asks him to lend her 100 francs. Flustered, he pushes some cash across the table, which she puts in to her bag uncounted. She looks untidy, set to continue in the downward spiral of other Rhys heroines, but accepts Mr Mackenzie's offer of a second drink. He buys her another Pernod and leaves.

== Background ==
Jean Rhys's material for this novel was drawn partly from her late 1927 visit to London for her mother's last days and funeral at Golders Green Crematorium. There, aged thirty-seven, she encountered estranged relatives including her aunt and sisters. This humiliating funeral scene is depicted in After Leaving Mr. Mackenzie.

Her family's disapproval extended back to Rhys's Edwardian chorus girl career, which she embarked on against parental wishes after exiting Cambridge's Perse School for Girls to enrol at the Royal Academy of Dramatic Art, where she lasted just two terms. Showbusiness led to her demimondaine phase, financed by wealthy first lover Lancelot Grey Hugh Smith, until he ended the affair. A backstreet abortion followed, with Smith subsidising her London boarding house life. She became a nude art model in the prelude to World War I. Her post-war Europe jaunts with first husband Jean Lenglet ended when he served prison time in France and was deported to Holland. Rhys's failure to keep their daughter Maryvonne, who spent much of her infancy in care, seemed another stain on her character. Her extramarital affair in Paris with Ford Madox Ford compounded this. The Ford affair's aftermath is what After Leaving Mr. Mackenzie explores, with Julia Martin lightly slapping her ex-lover's face with an empty glove in a Paris bar, as Rhys had to Ford.

Her family's indifference to the publication of The Left Bank and Other Stories (1927), and to her grief at the death of her first baby by Lenglet felt unjust to Rhys, who hints at bourgeois prejudice and hypocrisy in this and most of her novels.

On the same late 1927 London visit, Rhys met for the last time with Lancelot Grey Hugh Smith, who for the last time lent her money (as with old flame Mr James in After Leaving Mr. Mackenzie). Smith, like others, was tired of her suffering.

Besides visiting London for these purposes, getting Quartet published necessitated her presence there. A reader for Hamish Hamilton and freelance literary agent, divorcee Leslie Tilden Smith, had offered help. In May 1928, Rhys moved in to Tilden Smith's Holland Park house (located as per Mr Horsfield's in After Leaving Mr. Mackenzie) and began a relationship with him, formalising her separation from Lenglet on 19 June. Tilden Smith would become Rhys's second husband in 1934, the year after her divorce from Lenglet. By the time of Quartet's release in September 1928, Rhys was writing After Leaving Mr. Mackenzie with Tilden Smith's full-time support. She wrote in bed while he did the housework and proofread her pages.

In 1928, she persuaded Tilden Smith to finance a writing trip for her, alone in Rive Gauche Paris. She stayed in the Hotel Henri IV behind the Quai des Grands-Augustins, inhabiting the world of After Leaving Mr. Mackenzie's Julia Martin who lives in the same hotel. Julia read most of the time. Jean Rhys wrote.

== Reception ==
Reviewers noted the novel's bleakness but praised Rhys's style. Rebecca West wrote in The Daily Telegraph: "Miss Jean Rhys has already in 'The Left Bank' and 'Postures' quietly proved herself to be one of the finest writers of fiction under middle age, but she has also proved herself to be enamoured of gloom to an incredible degree." West acknowledged the quality: "It is a terrible book about the final foundering to destruction of a friendless and worthless but pitiful woman. It is terrible, but it is superb."

Gerald Gould in The Observer called After Leaving Mr. Mackenzie: "A hard, clean, dry, desperate book, so rigid in its economy that its impressiveness seems almost contemptuous." Deeming it not a "pleasant" novel, Gould wrote that "it has more important merits", and he concluded: "Of its kind, and within its limits, this book is a flawless work of art."

The Bookman (New York)'s Geoffrey Stone found the central character "sordid" but was "surprised to find that the meaning of the book as a whole appears just as clearly, and is much the same, as in any tale with a moral. It is no defect in the work". Impressed by the economy of Rhys's style, he added: "Julia's existence and the existence of those with whom she came in contact are somehow made meaningful by these very meaningless odds and ends of observation."
