= Let Them Call It Jazz =

Short story

- Short story by Jean Rhys
- Country: United Kingdom
- Language: English
- Genre: Short story

Publication
- Published in: The London Magazine
- Publication date: February 1962

"Let Them Call It Jazz" is a short story by Jean Rhys. The story was first published in The London Magazine in February 1962.

The work was first collected in Tigers Are Better-Looking (1968) by André Deutsch.

== Plot ==
The plot of the story follows the life of the narrator, Selina Davis, a biracial Afro-Caribbean woman in mid-20th-century England.

Selina, who narrates, is living in London and trying to find work as a seamstress, but her cultural views conflict with those of her British acquaintances. At the beginning of the story she is evicted from her apartment over a rent dispute, and soon meets a man in a café who offers her lodging in his house. The house - described as "classy" by the narrator - is older than other homes on the street, and the owner's refusal to change the home has created friction with the neighbors.

Selina lives in the home for a week but is unable to find work, instead passing her time thinking, drinking and singing in the street. She is scrutinized by her neighbors, who disparage her lack of work, drinking habits, and singing; one couple is also overtly racist and sexist towards her. Selina copes with this by drinking and taking sleeping pills. In one conversation with the house's owner, the man reveals that he values the house but may sell the lease, lamenting what money does to people. When Selena responds that money has never meant much to her, the man retorts that she is a fool, then, and states that those without money will be pushed around and inevitably be made caricatures of themselves.

The next week, Selina gets into two confrontations with the neighboring couple. The first encounter results in her being fined £5 for singing in the street, while during the second she (in a fit of frustration) throws a rock through the couple's window and is arrested. Selina is unable to pay her fine or explain her case to the local magistrate, and so is incarcerated for 10 days in Holloway Prison. While in prison she hears a song (the "Holloway Song") being sung by the other prisoners. The narrator enjoys the tune and adds her own inflections to, imagining it being played on trumpets so "these walls will fall and rest". Inspired by the song and the resilience of the other prisoners, the narrator regains some lost weight and stops drinking. She is released after 10 days after an unknown benefactor pays her fine, but upon her return to her house she finds the home being remodeled.

Some time after, Selina gets a job in an upscale clothier, lying about her credentials in the process. During a party at her co-worker's house she - having given up singing - whistles the Holloway song, which attracts the attention of a man at the party. The man plays a jazzed-up version of her song on a borrowed piano; the narrator dislikes this, stating it is being played wrong and feeling that her source of resiliency has been warped. However, the other guests like the new song. Later, the narrator receives a thank-you note and £5 from the man, who writes that he has sold the song and that she was "quite a help" inspiring him. She is initially horrified, grieving that the song - a symbol of her struggle - was the only thing she had. However, she eventually concludes that the song was sung for her, and that, no matter how the song is played now, it will make no difference to the song she heard. With this in mind, she muses that people can play it how they like and 'let them call it jazz', and buys a dress with the money.

== Background ==
"Let Them Call It Jazz" is one of the short stories Jean Rhys' wrote at Cheriton Fitzpaine during her absence from the literary spotlight. The story was first published in The London Magazine in 1962, and later appeared with other of Rhys' short stories in her 1968 compilation Tigers Are Better-Looking. Many sources describe the story as a work of postcolonial literature.

== Themes ==
The story's themes include cultural exchange, cultural identity, the Caribbean diaspora, sexism, racism, and colonialism.

The opening passage in “Let Them Call It Jazz” exposes the brutality of the protagonist's social situation. Rhys writes Selena’s monologue in West Indian dialect.

One bright Sunday morning in July I have trouble with my Notting Hill landlord because he ask me for a month’s rent in advance. He tell me this after I live there since winter, settling up every week without fail. I have no job at the time, and if I give the money he want there’s not much left. So I refuse. The man drunk already at early hour, and he abuse me—all talk, he can’t frighten me. But his wife is a bad one—now she walk in my room and say she must have cash. When I tell her no, she give my suitcase one kick, and it burst open. My best dress fall out, then she laugh and give another kick. She say month in advance is usual, and if I can’t pay find somewhere else.

“Let Them Call It Jazz” reveals a thematic continuity in Rhys’s short fiction. Though Selina is a mixed-race West Indian immigrant woman in England, her isolation and suffering is consistent with Rhys’s white female protagonists who suffer “the exclusion and cruelty of English society in similar ways…ignored and ill-treated by a social structure that exists for the benefit of others, and not theirs.” Nonetheless, Selina’s race and ethnicity, as well as her West Indian dialect, add a pernicious dimension to her stigmatization. While no racial slur is uttered against her, Selina is constantly reminded of her degraded social status. Literary critics Cheryl and David Malcolm write:

Rhys…points to a more insidious aspect of the abuse to which Selina is subjected to. The superior attitude of her white English neighbors makes it beneath their dignity to give her race a name…she is neither “nigger” nor “Selina Davis,” but a nonperson without presence or existence.

=== The Holloway Prison song ===
Selina finds little satisfaction in breaking the window of a bigoted white couple who provoke her wrath. Her true catharsis only comes by way of a song: “Selina’s rock-throwing is less liberating than the song she hears sung from the prison punishment cells which restores her to life.”

When Selina is introduced to the song among other imprisoned outcasts—sung by an unseen West Indian girl like herself—she experiences “her only moment of intimacy and belonging.” Selena reflects on its significance:

[W]hen that girl sing, she sing to me and she sing for me. I was there because I was meant to be there. It was meant I should hear it—this I know.

Rhys introduces the central irony of the narrative when the song is appropriated by a local musician who turns the work into a profitable jazz tune. In doing so, Selina is stripped of the last vestige of her West Indies identity. As such, when they “call it jazz,” the song becomes the property of her oppressors: “Here the echoes of colonial experience are unmistakable—the paternalism and the plundered Eden .”

The story contains an autobiographical element: Rhys suffered from life-long anxieties concerning her neighbors, who she imagined were “whispering and plotting against her.” An incident in which Rhys slapped a man she felt had insulted her led to her brief incarceration at Holloway Prison. Biographer Evelyn Toynton reports that “the experience inspired her to write one of her finest short stories, "Let Them Call It Jazz."

Literary critics Cheryl and David Malcolm call the work “a masterpiece.”

== Radio and stage adaptions ==
Originally published in print, the short story was adapted into a radio-play by Winsome Pinnock for BBC Radio 4 in 1998. Jamaican writer Honor Ford-Smith also created a dramatic adaptation of Rhys' story.

== Sources ==
- Angier, Carole. 1990. Jean Rhys: Life and Work. Little, Brown and Company, Boston, Toronto, London. ISBN 0-316-04263-3
- Malcolm, Cheryl Alexander and Malcolm, David. 1996. Jean Rhys: A Study of the Short Fiction. Twayne Publishers, Simon & Schuster, New York. ISBN 0-8057-0855-3
- Rhys, Jean. 1987. Jean Rhys: The Collected Short Stories. W. W. Norton & Co., ISBN 0-393-30625-9
- Seymour, Miranda. I Used To Live Here Once: The Haunted Life of Jean Rhys. W. W. Norton & Company, New York. ISBN 978-1-324-00612-1
- Toynton, Evelyn. 1992. "Life into Art; review of Jean Rhys: Life and Work by Carole Angier." The American Scholar, Spring 1992, Vol. 61, No. 2 (Spring 1992), pp. 298, 300-302 The Phi Beta Kappa Society. https://www.jstor.org/stable/41212018 Accessed 10 January, 2026.
