= On Not Shooting Sitting Birds =

- Short story by Jean Rhys

Publication
- Publisher: The New Yorker
- Media type: Magazine
- Publication date: August 19, 1976

“On Not Shooting Sitting Birds” is a work of short fiction by Jean Rhys originally appearing in The New Yorker (August 19, 1976) and first collected in Sleep It Off Lady (1976) by André Deutsch publishing.

The story has been compared to a "miniature" Wide Sargasso Sea (1966), Rhys's novel about her life in the West Indies and as an ex-colonial in England.

“On Not Shooting Sitting Birds” is included in the 1987 volume Jean Rhys: The Collected Short Stories by W. W. Norton & Company.

== Plot ==
“On Not Shooting Sitting Birds” is presented from a first-person point-of-view by a reliable narrator. The story is set in England during the Belle Époque , circa 1910.

The unnamed narrator, a youthful middle-class white woman raised in a British Caribbean colony, agrees to have dinner with a young Englishman whom she finds attractive. Anticipating a pleasant evening that she is certain will culminate in love-making, she purchases a “pink…milanese silk chemise and drawers” for the occasion. She arrives at the engagement with romantic notions of English society and its upper-class social norms.

While dining, she detects that the Englishman is increasingly anxious. He asks her guardedly, “But you’re a lady, aren’t you?” She deflects the query too lightly with “Oh no, not that you’d notice,” which only increases the gentleman's rigid class-conscious suspicions.

The young woman shifts the topic to game hunting, a topic she assumes will appeal to any Englishman. She describes the avian game species of the West Indies—of which he is entirely ignorant and uninterested—and invents an imaginary narrative concerning a hunting party on her family's estate. Consciously dissembling and unconsciously deluding herself, she concocts a largely fictional narrative derived from unreliable childhood memories. The so-called hunting party was no more than her two older brothers, just boys at the time. When they fired their guns, she had fearfully crouched behind a bush with her fingers plugged her ears. During her dinner, she inadvertently makes remarks that lead the gentleman to conclude that the presumably adult hunters had shot birds perched on tree limbs—a gross violation of British bird hunting etiquette. He interrupts her: “Do you mean to say your brothers shot sitting birds?” His tone is one of outrage and disgust. The young woman realizes she cannot redeem herself by revealing the truth; she grows cold in response to his reaction. The pair part ways at her apartment, each offering a curt goodnight.

While removing her lovely pink chemise in her bedroom, the woman consoles herself: “Some other night perhaps, another sort of man.”

== Narrative form and structure ==
“On Not Shooting Sitting Birds” is more an autobiographical record than a work of fiction, according to biographer Miranda Seymour. She characterizes the work as “an artfully structured reminiscence of Rhys’s childhood in Dominica.”

Biographers Cheryl and David Malcolm identify three distinct narratives. The main narrative concerns the events surrounding an evening the narrator/protagonist recalls spending with an attractive young English gentleman. The second narrative is an idealized childhood remembrance of a family bird hunting outing in the West Indies. The third narrative is the narrator's mature reassessment of the events surrounding the shooting party.

In each one the invisible, colonial female otherness of the protagonist/narrator points to a power and authority possessed by the male character which is as much cultural and national as it is sexual in its origins.

== Theme ==
Central to the narrative of “On Not Shooting Sitting Birds” were the nature of social hierarchies in England at the time. The narrator is a white woman raised in a British colony of the West Indies; there, a person's social status is based entirely on skin color i.e. the relative amount of European and/or African heritage. By contrast, the Englishman limits his social contacts to white persons of the upper-middle class.

When the Englishman warily asks her “You’re a lady, aren’t you?” he fears that he has mistakenly “placed” the attractive young woman in his elite social echelon. With a figurative bedroom “very obvious in the background,” the matter must be clarified before the evening proceeds: the gentleman might indulge in casual sex with a member of the lower classes - “a good-time girl” or an “amateur” prostitute - but not otherwise.

Literary critic Sue Thomas writing in the Journal of Caribbean Literature comments on the “moral panics over the ‘good-time girl’”

A pejorative term for a woman sexually active outside marriage and not demanding cash payment like a prostitute, the good-time girl was a figure of promiscuity, moral degeneracy, venereal disease, threat to the national health, and death…during the First World War and the 1920s she was called the ‘amateur prostitute,’ or, more simply, ‘amateur.’’’

Thomas credits Rhys’s “alertness to irony” in her handling of class and gender issues, “articulated through discourses of taste and breeding.”

From the narrator's point of reference, any educated white woman in the mixed-race West Indies is a “lady”; her British companion lacks this perspective: he is utterly ignorant of that culture. In the face of the female protagonist's aplomb, he seeks to reconcile her status as “a lady” with her “unabashed sexuality,” the latter of which he associates with the working-class.

The problem facing the Englishman is that his companion defies classification. She is at once a lady and (italics) a tramp. But the impossibility, as far as he is concerned, than anyone can be both reinforces the perception that she cannot, in effect, exist at all.

Desperate to establish some common ground with the gentleman, the narrator resorts to sharing an experience familiar to all members of the upper-middle-class: recreational wild game hunting. Her effort to enlist his class sympathy fails, provoking only skepticism and hostility from the Englishman.

The results are threefold. The Englishman is repelled; his relationship with the woman is irreconcilably polarized; and his sense of cultural superiority is bolstered.”

== Sources ==
- Malcolm, Cheryl Alexander and Malcolm, David. 1996. Jean Rhys: A Study of the Short Fiction. Twayne Publishers, Simon & Schuster, New York. ISBN 0-8057-0855-3
- Rhys, Jean. 1987. Jean Rhys: The Collected Short Stories. W. W. Norton & Company, New York, London. ISBN 0-393-30625-9
- Seymour, Miranda. I Used To Live Here Once: The Haunted Life of Jean Rhys. W. W. Norton & Company, New York. ISBN 978-1-324-00612-1
- Thomas, Sue. 2003. Thinking Through "[t]he grey disease of sex hatred": Jean Rhys's "Till September Petronella" Journal of Caribbean Literature, Summer 2003, Vol. 3, No. 3, pp. 77–90. Maurice Lee Stable, publisher. https://www.jstor.org/stable/40986145 Accessed 10 January 2026.
