= Till September Petronella =

"“Till September Petronella”"
- Short story by {{{author}}}

Publication
- Publisher: The London Magazine,
- Media type: Literary journal
- Publication date: January 1960

“Till September Petronella” is a work of short fiction by Jean Rhys originally appearing in The London Magazine (January 1960) and first collected in Tigers Are Better-Looking (1968) by André Deutsch (1968). The story is included in the 1987 volume Jean Rhys: The Collected Short Stories by W. W. Norton & Co..

== Plot ==
“Till September Pretronella” is presented from a first-person point-of-view by a reliable narrator, Pertronella Gray, a young woman with an upper-middle-class education but now in reduced circumstances. The story is set in England at the end of the Belle Epoch and the start of World War I. The events unfold on a single day: July 28, 1914.

Petronella resides in a bed-sitting room near Torrington Square. Her income is five pounds a week. She has tried, but so far failed, to establish herself on the London stage as a chorus girl. An acquaintance, Marsten, a young painter, and his associate Julian, a talented musician and composer, have invited her to spend a fortnight at a summer cottage. Both men are from wealthy families. Delighted for an opportunity to escape London, she has accepted.

Petronella arrives at the cottage to find that Julian has a female companion, Frankie Morell. The two women recognize one another: they travel in the same demimonde circles in London.

Petronella gathers that Marsten is anxious to sleep with her, but is too diffident to make a forthright proposition. She does not find him sexually attractive. She is intrigued by Julian, referring to him as “the great Julian” and irritating Marsten. The banter over dinner among the foursome becomes rancorous, fueled with wine. Julian adopts an openly misogynistic attitude toward Petronella; Marsden accuses Julian of being jealous.

Distraught and disgusted, Petronella walks away from the cottage and onto the highway. She has left her handbag and money in her room. A local farmer pulls over and offers her a ride; he deposits her at a pub and orders her some tea while he attends to some business matters. He returns and good-naturally proposes they see each other regularly when he has business in London—to their mutual advantage. Petronella demures, but they drink a bottle of Clicquot, and she sings songs for him when they drive to pick up her purse. At the cottage, Petronella has a hostile exchange with Marsten; he in turn vehemently denounces Frankie. Petronella departs through the window to avoid further contact with the trio. Marsten calls after her: “See you in September, Petronella. I’ll be back in September.”

The farmer purchases for Petornella a first-class carriage fare and deposits her at the train station. She arrives that night back in London. In hailing a taxi, she discovers a young gentleman has already secured the vehicle; he offers to share the ride with her. They drive toward her residence, but she suddenly expresses despair at returning to her garret. The gentleman is both wary and intrigued by her behavior. They agree to have dinner together; the young man suspects the woman may be seeking a male patron. When they part that evening, she insists that he return bearing a gold bracelet, after she returns in September. He declares, “All right. I’ll see you in September, Petronella.”

== Background ==
“They are dated, or course and perhaps too carefully written. Nonetheless, I think there might be an idea or two knocking about. Especially the last one which is called “In September Petronella.” Dated. But purposely.—Jean Rhys, in a letter to literary critic Diana Athill, 11 June 1959, regarding the stories collected in Tigers Are Better-Looking (1968).

Though first published in the sixties, “Till September Petronella” was written in the 1930s. The story is a reworking of the chapter “Hebertson” in Rhys's 1924 (unpublished) novel Triple Sec (initially titled ‘Suzy Tells.” ( Triple sec is an orange-flavored liqueur introduced in France during the 19th century and widely used in cocktails.)

Biographer and critic Sue Thomas identifies the thematic elements in this precursor to “Till September Petronella”:

In the earliest of these versions of the narrative, "Triple Sec," the story of the rural holiday has three thematic threads: the performance of gender in wartime; the highbrow gendering of mass culture by male aesthetes and the re-structuring within mass culture of an alternative male heroic epic of conscientious objection; and the discrepancy between conscientious objection to war service and domestic aggression.

== Theme ==
“Till September Petronella” exposes the nature of the rigid British social orders that persisted through the decline of the Empire. Focusing on a single day, Rhys “lays bare the forces of wealth and social class in women’s experience" which, in turn, reflects conditions throughout “a whole nation.” Sue Thomas writes: “My approach to "Till September Petronella”...emphasizes the historically contingent worldings or perspectives from which the various narratives emerge. This entails an analytic attentive to the discourses of empire, gender, sex, race, class, and desire...”

=== Class and gender antagonisms ===
”Between 1935 and 1939 I think Jean Rhys wrote two of her greatest short stories: ‘Till September Petronella’ and ‘Tigers Are Better Looking.’ These two stories locate Jean very precisely on her journey; at the high point of her art, but a very low point in her feeling. They are full of fear, full of hate, especially of women.”—Biographer Carole Angier in Jean Rhys: Life and Work (1990)

“Till September Petronella” examines the sharp class distinctions between British aristocratic males and young women who have descended from the lower social echleon despite their education. These encounters are frustrating and humiliating for the woman. Biographers Cheryl and David Malcolm term the story “a report from the class war.”

In London, Petronella serves as an escort for the upper-middle-class Melville. Rhys provides a dramatization of the class hostility in an exchange between the gentleman Melville and their Cockney taxi driver:

“Here, where am I going to? This is the third time you’ve changed your mind since you ‘ailed me.”

“You’ll go where you’re damned well told.”

“Well, where am I damned well told.”

“Go to Marble Arch.”

“Y’de park.” the driver said, looking us up and down and smiling broadly. Then he got back into his seat.

“I can’t bear some of these chaps,” the young man said.

When the taxi stopped at Park Lane we both got out without a word. The driver looked us up and down scornfully before he started away.

=== Wartime romance ===
Rhys places the story in the context of the “Great War.” the first global clash of modern militarized powers. Though limited in dramatic action, “Rhys renders visible the shattering of psychic identity, whose intensity is no less violent [than] political and military cataclysms [which] challenge the mind through the monstrosity of their violence.” As such, the historical context “gives sexual romance a particular immediacy.”

The story ends on a note of tragic irony. Both Marsten and Melville each bid adieu to Petronella with a promise to see her “in September.” The date is July 28, 1914, shortly after the European nations have declared war on one another. Within days or weeks these men will volunteer or be inducted into the army: British forces suffered almost 900,000 military deaths during the four-year conflict.

== Sources ==
- Angier, Carole. 1990. Jean Rhys: Life and Work. Little, Brown and Company, Boston, Toronto, London. ISBN 0-316-04263-3
- Malcolm, Cheryl Alexander and Malcolm, David. 1996. Jean Rhys: A Study of the Short Fiction. Twayne Publishers, Simon & Schuster, New York. ISBN 0-8057-0855-3
- Rhys, Jean. 1987. Jean Rhys: The Collected Short Stories. pp. 125–150 W. W. Norton & Company, New York, London. ISBN 0-393-30625-9
- Seymour, Miranda. I Used To Live Here Once: The Haunted Life of Jean Rhys. W. W. Norton & Company, New York. ISBN 978-1-324-00612-1
- Thomas, Sue. 2003. Thinking Through "[t]he grey disease of sex hatred": Jean Rhys's "Till September Petronella" Journal of Caribbean Literature, Summer 2003, Vol. 3, No. 3, pp. 77–90. Maurice Lee Stable, publisher. JSTOR 40986145 Accessed 10 January 2026.
