= In a Café =

- Short story by Jean Rhys

Publication
- Publisher: Jonathan Cape, Harper & Brothers
- Publication date: 1927

"In a Café" is a work of short fiction by Jean Rhys first published in the collection The Left Bank and Other Stories in 1927 by Jonathan Cape (London) and Harper & Brothers (New York).

== Plot ==
"In a Café" is told in the third person from a detached observer's point-of-view. The story is set in the Paris Latin Quarter during the teens or 1920s.

A quartet of middle-aged male musicians are performing in a café. Their repertoire is eclectic, ranging from La Belotte to excerpts from Beethoven and Massenet. The clientele include businessmen and their wives, Bohemian couples and many foreigners. The atmosphere is subdued and suitable for serious conversation.

A stout gentleman steps onto the stage and announces he has been engaged to sing a song of his own composition. He appears “self-confident, eager and extraordinarily vulgar.” The man proceeds to perform “Les Grues de Paris” with piano accompaniment. The short, sentimental piece outlines the fate of a Paris canaille, extolling her virtues—“her charity, her warm-heartedness, her practical sympathy”—and finally recounting her brutal humiliation when spurned by a former male client she encounters on the street: the now respectable married man with children remarks loudly to his wife: “No matter, it is only a gru…u…er!”

A subtle change comes over the café as the nature of the lyrics are perceived by the patrons: the women quickly occupy themselves with reapplying their make-up; the men avert their eyes from the stage and gulp their beverages. The audience claps vigorously as the performance ends. The singer does a brisk business hawking the sheet music for “Les Grues de Paris” to the clientele.

The band returns to their regular musical program and peace is restored to the café.

== Theme ==
The social phenomenon of the grue and her role in French society is alluded to ironically. The lyrics to the balladeer's song serve to sentimentalize sex workers, portraying the grue as worthy of a patronizing pity, assuaging the shame of the Parisian male patriarchal establishment that exploit their services, a practice their spouses must tolerate. The narrator explains the socially accepted view of grues: "The grues are the sellers of illusion Paris, the frail and sometimes pretty ladies, and Paris is sentimental and indulgent towards them. That, in the mass and theoretically of course, not always practically or as individuals."

Literary critic Rebecca Colesworthy writing in the Journal of Modern Literature acknowledges the transactional element in the function of the grue, where sex is exchanged for money. Nonetheless, the prostitute satisfies the fundamental sexual needs of her client; her motives may be other than purely predatory.

Sex for money, Rhys suggests, may be experienced as a mutually satisfying exchange, a reciprocity, that serves to obscure class and gender differences.

[T]he audience’s discomfort during the song—the women “looked into their mirrors” while the men “drank up their beers hastily and looked sideways”—demonstrates their guilty identification with the ex-lover and his bride, and suggests that the balladeer’s language is also to be taken at face value: the grue’s charity is not strictly speaking commercial.

== Sources ==
- Colesworthy, Rebecca. 2014. Jean Rhys and the Fiction of Failed Reciprocity. Journal of Modern Literature, Vol. 37, No. 2 (Winter 2014), pp. 92–108. Indiana University Press. https://www.jstor.org/stable/10.2979/jmodelite.37.2.92 Accessed 10 January 2026.
- Malcolm, Cheryl Alexander and Malcolm, David. 1996. Jean Rhys: A Study of the Short Fiction. Twayne Publishers, Simon & Schuster, New York. ISBN 0-8057-0855-3
- Rhys, Jean. 1987. Jean Rhys: The Collected Short Stories. W. W. Norton & Company, New York, London. ISBN 0-393-30625-9
