= I Used to Live Here Once =

2022 book by Miranda Seymour

I Used to Live Here Once: The Haunted Life of Jean Rhys
- U. K. book cover
- Author: Miranda Seymour
- Language: English
- Subject: Jean Rhys
- Publisher: W. W. Norton & Company
- Publication date: May 12, 2022
- Pages: 448
- ISBN: 978-1-324-00612-1

I Used to Live Here Once: The Haunted Life of Jean Rhys is a 2022 book by Miranda Seymour that examines the life of Jean Rhys.
