= Speak, Silence =

2021 non-fiction book by Carole Angier

Speak, Silence: In Search of W. G. Sebald
- Author: Carole Angier
- Language: English
- Subject: W. G. Sebald
- Publisher: Bloomsbury Circus
- Publication date: October 5, 2021
- Media type: Print
- Pages: 640
- ISBN: 978-1-5266-3479-5

Speak, Silence: In Search of W. G. Sebald is a 2021 non-fiction book by Carole Angier that examines the life of W. G. Sebald. The book received mixed reviews.
