= Good Morning, Midnight (Rhys novel) =

1939 novel by Jean Rhys

- First edition
- Author: Jean Rhys
- Language: English
- Genre: Modernism
- Published: 1939
- Publisher: Constable
- Publication place: UK
- Media type: Print (hardback)

Good Morning, Midnight is a 1939 modernist novel by the author Jean Rhys. Often considered a continuation of Rhys's three other early novels, Quartet (1928), After Leaving Mr. Mackenzie (1931) and Voyage in the Dark (1934), it is experimental in design and deals with a woman's feelings of vulnerability, depression, loneliness and desperation during the years between the two World Wars.

The book initially sold poorly—critics thought it well written, but too depressing—and after its publication Rhys spent a decade living in obscurity. It was not until it was adapted by Selma Vaz Dias into a radio play, first broadcast by the BBC in 1957, that Rhys was once again put into the spotlight.

== Background ==
The novel's title is derived from a poem by the American poet Emily Dickinson, which is also included as an epigraph before the text opens:

Good morning, Midnight!
I'm coming home,
Day got tired of me –
How could I of him?

Sunshine was a sweet place,
I liked to stay –
But Morn didn't want me – now –
So good night, Day!

== Plot introduction ==
Sasha Jansen, a middle-aged English woman, has returned to Paris after a long absence. Only able to make the trip because of some money lent to her by a friend, she is financially unstable and haunted by her past, which includes an unhappy marriage and her child's death. She has difficulty taking care of herself; drinking heavily, taking sleeping pills and obsessing over her appearance, she is adrift in the city to which she feels connected despite the great pain it has brought her.

== Reception and resurgence of popularity ==
Although early critics noted that Good Morning, Midnight was well written, they found its depressing storyline ultimately repellent.

Rhys had disappeared from public view and fallen into obscurity shortly after Good Morning, Midnight was published in 1939. In fact, many believed that she was dead as a result of the seeming end of her literary career. When Selma Vaz Dias adapted the novel for theatrical presentation in 1949, her husband had to place advertisements in the New Statesman and the Nation to find Rhys in order to gain her permission, which she gave enthusiastically. Rhys credited Dias with reawakening her literary inclinations, stating in November of that same year that Dias had "lifted the numb hopeless feeling that stopped me writing for so long". In 1957, Dias's adaptation of Good Morning, Midnight was performed on BBC radio.

V. S. Naipaul wrote in 1973 that it is "the most subtle and complete of [Rhys'] novels, and the most humane".

The novel and Rhys' own struggles are the subject of the song 'The Glitter' on Irish folk singer Maija Sofia's debut album Bath Time about women who have been wronged by history.
