= Quartet (novel) =

1928 novel by Jean Rhys

- Author: Jean Rhys
- Original title: Postures
- Language: English
- Subject: Autobiography
- Set in: Paris
- Published: 1928
- Publisher: Chatto & Windus
- Publication place: England
- Media type: Print

Quartet is Jean Rhys's 1928 debut novel, set in Paris's bohemian café society. Originally published by Chatto & Windus, Quartet was Rhys's first published book other than her short story collection The Left Bank and Other Stories (1927).

In the UK, Quartet was released under the publisher's preferred title Postures, which Rhys disliked. After it was well received in the US as Quartet (1929), Rhys had later UK editions re-titled to her original choice of Quartet, which alludes to four central characters comprising two couples.

Quartet is a work of autobiographical fiction. It is a roman à clef based on her extramarital affair and acrimonious breakup with her literary mentor Ford Madox Ford, the English author and editor of The Transatlantic Review literary magazine. The affair occurred in Ford's Paris home under the eye of his common-law wife, Australian artist Stella Bowen, while Rhys's husband, Jean Lenglet, was in jail.

Written in third-person narrative, Quartet is framed from the viewpoint of Rhys's fictional counterpart, Marya (nicknamed Mado).

== Synopsis ==
Peripatetic young married couple Stephan and Marya Zelli board in a cheap Paris hotel while Stephan, a fly-by-night Polish art dealer, conducts business. Reliant on Stephan as provider, Marya seldom questions his dealings. They live hand-to-mouth as his deal takes shape. When Stephan is charged with selling stolen artwork and sentenced to a year's jail, Marya, stranded and alone in a foreign city, is destitute. At Stephan's urging from jail, she moves in with avuncular Englishman H. J. Heidler and his painter wife, Lois, whom she knows socially. There she discovers Heidler's history of inviting young women to lodge in his spare room, initiating affairs with them as Lois turns a blind eye. When Marya visits Stephan in jail, Heidler and Lois object and discourage her from seeing him. Isolated under his roof and dependent on his charity, Marya succumbs to Heidler's advances. With Marya at their mercy, Heidler and Lois escort her around their social haunts in a charade of respectability, deflecting suspicion and gossip about the ménage à trois. Obliged to comply, Marya suspects people guess the truth regardless. Tension mounts between Marya and Lois, which Heidler ignores. Released from jail, the once self-assured Stephan is broken and Marya guilt-ridden. Heidler pushes Marya to choose between himself and Stephan, while refusing to forfeit his own marriage to Lois. Torn, Marya pities Stephan, which he resents. As her affair with Heidler breaks down, Stephan bolts, leaving Marya's fate in the hands of Heidler and Lois.

== Background ==
Rhys and her first of three husbands, Jean Lenglet, a multilingual Dutch journalist and French Intelligence Service spy, met in London in 1917. After World War I, they roamed Europe, marrying in the Hague in 1919. They moved between Amsterdam, Belgium, Paris, and Vienna, where, from 1920, Lenglet was a secretary-interpreter with the Inter-Allied Commission of Control's Japanese delegation, which monitored disarmament in Austria-Hungary. When the job transferred him to Budapest, Lenglet was caught using Commission money for currency speculation. When he failed to repay the money on time, he and Rhys absconded back to Paris, with the Inter-Allied Commission on his trail. French solicitors meanwhile pursued Lenglet over a previous undissolved marriage (Rhys being the third of his five wives). In Paris on 28 December 1924, Lenglet was arrested and accused by his new employer, American travel agency Exprinter, of embezzling 23,421 francs. He denied the charge, claiming the company had given him the money for a transaction, but his defence was dismissed, and on 10 February 1925, he was sentenced to eight months at Fresnes Prison.

This left Rhys destitute and panic-stricken. With Lenglet's agreement from jail, she allowed herself to be taken in by Ford Madox Ford and Stella Bowen. She had met the couple in 1924, when, penniless with Lenglet working away as a journalist, she tried selling some of his articles through H. Pearl Adam, a well-connected British expatriate that she met at a tea party. Wife of wartime Times correspondent George Adam and daughter of Truth columnist C.E. Humphry, Adam wrote for the Evening Standard, The Observer, The Sunday Times, and other newspapers.

Thinking Lenglet's articles unmarketable, as an afterthought, Adam perused Rhys's diary of her time in London, Paris, Vienna, and Budapest. Seeing literary potential, Adam allowed Rhys to live with her while helping edit and divide the diary into stories, then sent her to Ford Madox Ford, who helped new writers.

Ford mentored Rhys, published her first short story, "Vienne", in The Transatlantic Review, and introduced her to other contributors. At Ford and Bowen's parties, she met people like Ernest Hemingway, Gertrude Stein, Alice B. Toklas, and painter Nina Hamnett.

Under Ford and Bowen's roof, with Lenglet in jail, an affair developed between Rhys and Ford, which Bowen initially tolerated. She asked Rhys to pose for paintings, gave her clothes, and confided in her, outwardly befriending her but silently disapproving. Presenting a respectable front, the couple took Rhys to Le Dôme Café and other intellectual gathering spots on the Boulevard du Montparnasse, showing her off as Ford's protégé, while rivalry grew between Bowen and Rhys, and tension formed between Bowen and Ford. The trio's nonchalant façade was what Quartet's earlier title, Postures, alluded to.

By the time of Lenglet's prison release, the Ford affair was unhidden, and Lenglet felt betrayed. Soon after, due to his French criminal record, Lenglet was expelled, returning to his native Holland without Rhys.

Ford and Bowen sent Rhys to Juan-les-Pins, finding her a live-in job ghostwriting a book on reincarnation and interior design for Rudolph Valentino's mother-in-law Winifred, second wife of American cosmetics millionaire Richard Hudnut.

With that, the "quartet", after which the novel is named, was dissolved.

Rhys revisited her relationships with Lenglet and Ford, but neither lasted. Ford and Bowen separated in 1927, after nine years together. Rhys and Lenglet remained intermittently estranged, formally separating in 1928 and divorcing in 1933. The pair remained close friends, bound by their daughter, Maryvonne Lenglet, who was three and in care at the time of her father's imprisonment; she later became his custodian.

This traumatic episode is considered one of Rhys's great creative catalysts, resulting in Quartet launching her career as a novelist. She comments on "L'Affaire Ford" in the Jean Rhys papers.

Jonathan Cape, who had published Rhys's The Left Bank and Other Stories, rejected Quartet as libelous, recognising the notable Ford Madox Ford in its plot. With the help of Rhys's subsequent husband, editor and literary agent Leslie Tilden Smith, Quartet was published in 1928 by Chatto & Windus.

Quartet's real-life character counterparts each published their own version of this episode from their respective viewpoints, all fictionalised, except for Stella Bowen's memoir Drawn from Life (1941), which recalls Rhys disparagingly. Quartet was the first published of the four and is the only one still in print. Ford's When the Wicked Man (1932) portrays Rhys as hysterical drunken Creole journalist Lola Porter, who uses Joseph Notterdam (Ford's character). Jean Lenglet's version appeared under the nom de plume Édouard de Nève in Dutch, French, and English. His Dutch novel was titled In de Strik (1932), and his French version was Sous les Verrous (1933). Rhys translated Sous les Verrous into English as Barred (1932) for Lenglet, who dedicated it to her. Her translation edited the Bowen character, softened her own, and revived Lenglet's writing career.

In old age, Rhys wrote of marriage to Lenglet, their life around Europe, meeting Ford and his literary coaching, in Smile Please: An Unfinished Autobiography (1979), which was published posthumously.

== Adaptations ==
The 1981 Merchant Ivory film of the same name, starring Isabelle Adjani, Maggie Smith, and Alan Bates, won Adjani the Cannes Film Festival Award for Best Actress and Smith the Evening Standard Awards Best Actress prize.
