= I Used to Live Here Once (short story) =

- Short story by Jean Rhys
- Genre: Ghost story

Publication
- Publisher: André Deutsch and Harper & Row
- Publication date: 1976

“I Used to Live Here Once” is a work of short fiction by Jean Rhys first collected in Sleep It Off Lady (1976) by André Deutsch and Harper & Row (New York).

A ghost story, “I Used to Live Here Once” is one the last works of fiction that Rhys wrote, and at roughly 400 words, perhaps her shortest.

== Plot ==
“I Used to Live Here Once” is a third-person limited-omniscient narrative. The narrator has walked to the bank of a river in memory, recalling the configuration of its stepping stones as she crosses. On the other side, roads and vegetation are familiar; she experiences a sense of joy as she traverses the landscape. Approaching a house, her heart begins to palpitate.

A boy and girl are standing under a mango tree. The narrator calls out to them, but neither responds, their faces turned away. As she nears the children she repeats her greeting and remarks, “I used to live here once.”

The boy turns and looks directly at the narrator, observing only to the girl that the air temperature has suddenly dropped. They run to the house to seek shelter. She stands, watching them flee: “That was the first time she knew.”

== Critical appraisal ==
Biographer Miranda Seymour describes the tale as Rhys's effort “to confront and tame the enduring ghosts of her own past…”

“I Used to Live Here Once” was admired by author William Trevor, as well as critic Robie Macauley at the New York Times Book Review, who thought the story was “among the finest, and certainly most concise, ghost story they had ever read.”

== Sources ==
- Malcolm, Cheryl Alexander and Malcolm, David. 1996. Jean Rhys: A Study of the Short Fiction. Twayne Publishers, Simon & Schuster, New York. ISBN 0-8057-0855-3
- Rhys, Jean. 1987. Jean Rhys: The Collected Short Stories. pp. 387–388. W. W. Norton & Company, New York, London. ISBN 0-393-30625-9
- Seymour, Miranda. I Used To Live Here Once: The Haunted Life of Jean Rhys. W. W. Norton & Company, New York. ISBN 978-1-324-00612-1
