= Quartet (1981 film) =

Film by James Ivory

- UK theatrical release poster
- Directed by: James Ivory
- Screenplay by: Ruth Prawer Jhabvala; Michel Maingois(French dialogue); James Ivory(uncredited)
- Based on: Quartet by Jean Rhys
- Produced by: Ismail Merchant; Jean-Pierre Mahot de la Querantonnais
- Starring: Alan Bates; Maggie Smith; Isabelle Adjani; Anthony Higgins
- Cinematography: Pierre Lhomme
- Edited by: Humphrey Dixon
- Music by: Richard Robbins
- Production companies: Merchant Ivory Productions; Lyric International
- Distributed by: 20th Century Fox (United Kingdom); Gaumont Distribution (France)
- Release dates: 17 May 1981 (Cannes); 20 May 1981 (France); July 1981 (United Kingdom)
- Running time: 101 minutes
- Countries: France; United Kingdom
- Languages: English; French

Quartet is a 1981 period drama film directed by James Ivory from a screenplay by Ruth Prawer Jhabvala, based on the 1928 novel by Jean Rhys. The film stars Alan Bates, Maggie Smith, Isabelle Adjani and Anthony Higgins, and is set in 1927 Paris. It premiered at the 1981 Cannes Film Festival.

== Plot ==
The beautiful Marya "Mado" Zelli is living with her husband Stephan, a Polish art dealer, in 1927 Paris. When he is convicted of selling stolen artwork, and imprisoned for one year, Marya is left penniless, with no means to support herself. At Stephan's urging, she moves into the apartment of some acquaintances, H.J. Heidler, a wealthy English art dealer, and his wife Lois, a painter. H.J. Heidler has a history of inviting vulnerable young women to move into the "spare room" only to seduce them. Lois permits this arrangement because she wants to keep H.J. from leaving her.

Marya becomes involved in the decadent Parisian lifestyle of the Heidlers and their group of fellow expatriates. Although she initially resists H.J.'s advances, Mado eventually begins an affair with him. The strain of living with the Heidlers begins to manifest itself; Marya becomes desperate to leave, and begs Lois to lend her money so she can get away. Lois, although extremely unhappy with the situation, is reluctant to interfere at the risk of alienating H.J. Her behavior towards Marya is increasingly passive-aggressive and insulting. During a hunting excursion to the countryside, Marya angrily confronts the pair, causing Lois to break down in anguish.

After this H.J. arranges for Marya to live in a hotel, where he visits her less frequently for sexual trysts. She grows lonely and depressed, contemplating suicide. During a tea party at the Heidlers', Lois casually reveals that H.J.'s previous mistress drowned herself in despair. When things are at their worst, Stephan is released from prison and must leave France immediately. Heidler threatens to cut ties with her entirely if she returns to her husband, and although Marya has longed to be re-united with Stephan, she is unable to choose between the two. Stephan realizes the truth, and the film ends with him leaving Marya to an uncertain future.

== Cast ==
- Isabelle Adjani as Marya Zelli (nickname Mado)
- Alan Bates as H. J. Heidler
- Maggie Smith as Lois Heidler
- Anthony Higgins as Stephan Zelli
- Sheila Gish as Anna
- Suzanne Flon as Madame Hautchamp
- Pierre Clementi as Theo
- Daniel Mesguich as Pierre Schlamovitz
- Virginie Thévenet as Mademoiselle Chardin
- Daniel Chatto as Guy
- Armelia McQueen as night club singer

== Release ==
The film was released by the Cohen Media Group on DVD and Blu-ray in 2019. Robert Abele of the Los Angeles Times said that "whether the arc of Marya's fate feels overly engineered to you or not, Quartet retains its power to unsettle in its accumulation of cuts and bruises, the rare Merchant-Ivory-Jhabvala effort that mines a glamorized past not for nuanced dignity but for a kind of elegant, honest sordidness".

== Reception ==
Metacritic, which uses a weighted average, assigned the film a score of 62 out of 100, based on 7 critics, indicating "generally favorable" reviews. On the review aggregator website Rotten Tomatoes, 47% of 17 critics' reviews are positive, with an average rating of 5/10.

Variety wrote: "Director James Ivory takes his usual aloofly observant distance and the film's love triangle loses some drastic impetus".

== Awards ==
Award	Date of ceremony	Category	Recipient(s)	Result	Ref(s)
British Academy Film Awards	18 March 1982	Best Actress	Maggie Smith	Nominated	
Cannes Film Festival	27 May 1981	Palme d'Or	James Ivory	Nominated	
Cannes Film Festival	27 May 1981	Best Actress	Isabelle Adjani (also for Possession)	Won	
Evening Standard British Film Awards	28 November 1982	Best Actress	Maggie Smith	Won	
