= Tigers Are Better-Looking =

First edition

Tigers are Better-Looking is a collection of short stories written by Dominican author Jean Rhys, published in 1968 by André Deutsch and reissued by Penguin ten years later. This collection's first eight stories were written by Rhys during her 1950s period of obscurity and first published in the early 1960s. The second nine are reissued from her 1927 debut collection The Left Bank and Other Stories. In 1979, the title story from Rhys's collection was adapted into a UK-produced short film, directed by Hussein Shariffe.

== Stories found in Tigers are Better-Looking ==
- "Till September Petronella"
- "The Day they Burned the Books"
- "Let Them Call It Jazz"
- "Tigers are Better-Looking"
- "Outside the Machine"
- "The Lotus"
- "A Solid House"
- "The Sound of the River"

== Stories found in The Left Bank and Other Stories ==
(Introduced by a preface to the original 1927 collection of twenty-two)

- "Illusion"
- "From a French Prison"
- "Mannequin"
- "Tea with an Artist"
- "Mixing Cocktails"
- "Again the Antilles"
- "Hunger"
- "La Grosse Fifi"
- "Vienne"

== Previous publications ==
- Till September Petronella The London Magazine 1960
- The Day they Burned the Books The London Magazine 1960
- Tigers are Better-Looking The London Magazine 1962
- Let Them Call it Jazz The London Magazine 1962
- The Sound of the River Art and Literature no. 9 1966
- The Lotus Art and Literature no. 11 1967
- Outside the Machine Winter's Tales (Macmillan)
- A Solid House Voices, Michael Joseph, 1963
