= Illusion (short story) =

"“Illusion”"
- Short story by Jean Rhys

Publication
- Publisher: Jonathan Cape, Harper & Brothers
- Media type: Print (hardback)
- Publication date: 1927

“Illusion” is a work of short fiction by Jean Rhys first published in her 1927 collection The Left Bank and Other Stories by Jonathan Cape (London) and Harper & Brothers (New York).

The story is included in the 1987 volume Jean Rhys: The Collected Short Stories by W. W. Norton & Co..

== Plot ==
“Illusion” is presented in the first-person singular by a reliable female narrator. The story is set in Montparnasse in the 1920s. The focal character is Miss Bruce, a well-to-do British expatriate. She is a portrait painter, and has on occasion been exhibited at the Salon.

After seven years in the Quarter Miss Bruce remains a through-going product of the British upper-class; the social milieu of Paris have left no trace on her. Though reserved in her demeanor, she is not unsociable, but has no intimate friends. She dresses conservatively at parties. The narrator has been lunching with Miss Bruce now and then for two years.

When the narrator arrives at Miss Bruce's studio for an appointment, she is informed by the concierge that Mademoiselle has been taken to the hospital due to an acute pain in her abdomen (she will soon undergo a successful appendectomy). The narrator is ushered into Miss Bruce's quarters and encouraged by the femme de ménage to select items from the wardrobe to take to the ailing woman.

When the narrator unlocks and opens the immense cabinet she is met with a fantastic riot of color: the wardrobe is filled with a rich array of elegant women's dresses, accessories, and perfumes. At first dismayed by the stylish collection, the narrator quickly grasps that Miss Bruce purchases the garments as a vicarious thrill; perhaps she models the clothing herself in front of the mirror. The narrator imagines pretty dresses disparaging Miss Bruce, “who had dared to buy them in order to condemn them to life in the dark…” She takes a few nightgowns and delivers them to the hospital.

When dining together after her recovery, Miss Bruce defends her penchant for collecting frocks, remarking: “I should never make such a fool of myself as to wear them…They ought to be worn, I suppose.”

== Theme ==
Three stories from The Left Bank—“Illusion,” “Mannequin,” and “La Grosse Fifi”—demonstrate “the centrality of the outsider figure in Rhys’s short stories and the complexity with which she deals with such figures and their possibilities for escaping a crushing social and sexual alienation.”

=== Narrator and narration ===
Infofar as action or drama is concerned, very little actually happens in “Illusion.” Nonetheless, the story reveals both a personal and social crisis.

The narrator in the story is not explicitly identified as female. Rather, her gender is suggested in the dialogue; the point-of-view is that of limited omnicent. Here, the protagonist is a detached participant observer.

The narrator engages in “authoritative” observations concerning a Miss Bruce—as to her income, elite social status, fashion sense, and personal motivations. In fact, the narrator only pretends to possess this “special information.” Biographers Cheryl and David Malcolm remind readers that “she doesn’t know Miss Bruce at all.”

Like so much else in this story, knowledge is an illusion. Here she is passing speculation, or, indeed, self-revelation off as knowledge.

She projects her own social disaffection onto Miss Bruce; in doing so, she suppresses an assessment of her own painful social alienation and vulnerability.

=== Homoeroticism ===
Miss Bruce's closeted collection of stylish eye-catching clothing with their vivid colors is utterly at odds with her conservative public attire. The narrator registers her delight at discovering these outfits:

[A]n evening dress of a very beautiful shade of gold: near it another of flame colour: of the two black dresses the one was touched with silver, the other with a jaunty embroidery of emerald and blue. There was a black and white check with a jaunty belt, a flowered crepe de chine—positively flowered!—then a carnival costume complete with mask, then a huddle, a positive huddle of colours, of all stuffs.

Literary critic Laurel Harris in the Journal of Modern Literature comments upon the nature of Miss Bruce's sartorial obsession:

In “Illusion,” the narrator opens the closet of a “healthy, sensible” Englishwoman who has been apparently indifferent to the “cult of beauty … all round her” in Paris to find a collection of extravagantly fashionable dresses, fragrances, and makeup. This revelation of the repressed trappings of modern femininity hidden in the closet, renders the psychological tangible. Miss Bruce’s unadorned face and body become here the “illusion” while the dresses, makeup, and fragrances define a true self within what Rishona Zimring aptly describes as a female drag performance.

Critics Cheryl and David Malcolm emphasize the centrality of these fashionable and flamboyant dresses inventoried to support the story's theme. Critic Laurel Harris writes : “‘Illusion’...introduce[s] fashion as an intimate relationship between subject and object that at once maintains their distinction and conjoins them” Miss Bruce's collection of multi-colored and “jaunty” clothing are merely “the symbols of feminine beauty.” In public she restricts herself to the drab and socially approved clothing of the British upper-middle class: “Miss Bruce can afford attractive dresses, but not wear them.”

Homoerotic elements appear in Rhys's characterization of Miss Bruce that suggest the source of her social alienation: the androgynous surname “Bruce.”, a “gentlemanly manner,” and her “large bones and hands and feet,” all of which stand in sharp contrast to the “petite femmes" she observes with remote condescension. The narrator, herself, is among these highly feminine, vulnerable and anxious “petite femmes.”

The reactionary class and sexual constraints that separate Miss Bruce from these lower-class demi-montaines provide an insight into her isolation.

The homoerotic element in Miss Bruce’s character and fascinations is integral to “Illusion” and adds another layer of estrangement from self and desires to the protagonist and the story.

== Sources ==
- Harris, Laurel. 2021. “Impassagenwerk: Jean Rhys's Interwar Fiction and the Modernist Impasse.” Journal of Modern Literature , Spring 2021, Vol. 44, No. 3 (Spring 2021), pp. 19–34. Indiana University Press. https://www.jstor.org/stable/10.2979/jmodelite.44.3.02 Accessed 10 January 2026.
- Malcolm, Cheryl Alexander and Malcolm, David. 1996. Jean Rhys: A Study of the Short Fiction. Twayne Publishers, Simon & Schuster, New York. ISBN 0-8057-0855-3
- Rhys, Jean. 1987. Jean Rhys: The Collected Short Stories. W. W. Norton & Company, New York, London. ISBN 0-393-30625-9
