= The Left Bank and Other Stories =

1927 literary debut of Jean Rhys

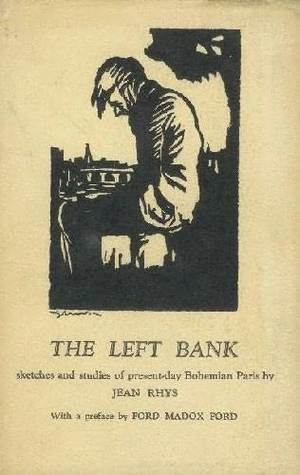
- First edition
- Author: Jean Rhys
- Publisher: Jonathan Cape, Harper & Brothers
- Publication date: 1927; 99 years ago
- Media type: Print (hardback)

The Left Bank and Other Stories is the first collection of short stories and literary debut of Dominican author Jean Rhys. It was first published by Jonathan Cape (London) and Harper & Brothers (New York) in 1927, and contained a preface by Ford Madox Ford.

The original subtitle of the collection was "sketches and studies of present-day Bohemian Paris".

Most of the twenty-two stories are impressionistic vignettes based on Rhys's own life experiences in and around the Left Bank of Paris. Some ("Mixing Cocktails and "Again the Antilles") are drawn from Rhys's early years in Dominica. The final story, Vienne, is based on her post-World War I life in Vienna with first husband Jean Lenglet, and was originally published in The Transatlantic Review in 1924.

Publication of The Left Bank and Other Stories was sponsored by Rhys's lover and literary mentor, Ford Madox Ford, sending the stories to his London contact, influential publisher's reader Edward Garnett. The book was well received by critics on its initial release, establishing Rhys's early writing career.

The book went out of print during Rhys's 1939–1966 period of obscurity but, following the resurgence of her career due to Wide Sargasso Sea (1966), selections from The Left Bank were republished in part by André Deutsch in Tigers are Better-Looking (1968), which included nine of the original twenty-two stories. The volume was next republished 1976 by W. W. Norton & Company, then again after Rhys's death by Penguin Classics incorporated into a wider compilation entitled Jean Rhys, The Collected Short Stories.

== Stories ==
- "Illusion"
- "A Spiritualist"
- "From A French Prison"
- "In a Café"
- "Tout Montparnasse and a Lady"
- "Mannequin"
- "In the Luxembourg Gardens"
- "Tea with an Artist"
- "Trio"
- "Mixing Cocktails"
- "Again the Antilles"
- "Hunger"
- "Discourse of a Lady Standing a Dinner to a Down-and-Out Friend"
- "A Night"
- "In the Rue de l'Arivée"
- "Learning to be a Mother"
- "The Blue Bird"
- "The Grey Day"
- "The Sidi"
- "At The Villa d'Or"
- "La Grosse Fifi"
- "Vienne"

== Retrospective appraisal ==
Biographer Carole Angier reports that this first volume of short stories garnered Rhys significant critical approval.

Literary critic Rayner Heppenstall deems Rhys's pieces in The Left Bank to be "less than brilliant."

[M]uch of the collection] is the merest reportage (italics), though I don’t suppose it was called that then. It is less than brilliant. Pace (italics) her most dedicated admirers, I don’t think that sharpness of either eye or ear were ever Miss Rhys's most conspicuous gifts."

Evelyn Toynton in The American Scholar praises the "mocking lucidity" with which Rhys depicted the sexual and social degradations of her female protagonists, adding this caveat

Certainly her books are not noteworthy for their subject matter alone. She wrote some of the most graceful prose of the century; she wrote as though she had no skin, in an artless seeming voice that could be achieved only through extraordinary artistry.

Rhys's short fiction in The Left Bank is notable for the range of narrative devices she deploys. Half of the stories are told by women, both explicitly and inferred by dialogue, as well as participant and nonparticipant narrators. The point-of-view is often that of limited omnicent.

The female narrators in these stories escort the reader through the Bohemian settings of her wealthy benefactors and lovers:

They are usually, in a certain sense, knowledgeable [and] privy to some kinds of special information…But this knowledge is strictly limited to external factors, to social mores, or the accepted meanings of words…Rhys's plots are traditional in their linear chronology.

== Sources ==
- Malcolm, Cheryl Alexander, and Malcolm, David. 1996. Jean Rhys: A Study of the Short Fiction. Twayne Publishers, Simon & Schuster, New York. ISBN 0-8057-0855-3
- Heppenstall, Rayner. 1968. "Bitter-sweet", Review of Tigers Are Better-Looking. The Spectator, April 5, 1968, 446–447 in A Study of the Short Fiction, pp. 124–125. Twayne Publishers, Simon & Schuster, New York. ISBN 0-8057-0855-3
- Rhys, Jean. 1987. Jean Rhys: The Collected Short Stories. W. W. Norton & Company, New York, London. ISBN 0-393-30625-9
- Toynton, Evelyn. 1992. Life into Art; review of Jean Rhys: Life and Work by Carole Angier. The American Scholar, Spring 1992, Vol. 61, No. 2 (Spring 1992), pp. 298, 300–302. The Phi Beta Kappa Society. https://www.jstor.org/stable/41212018 Accessed 10 January, 2026.
