= David Plante =

American novelist

- Born: March 4, 1940 (age 86); Providence, Rhode Island, U.S.
- Education: Boston College; Université catholique de Louvain
- Occupations: Novelist; diarist; memoirist
- Parent(s): Albina Bisson; Aniclet Plante

David Robert Plante (born March 4, 1940, in Providence, Rhode Island) is an American novelist, diarist, and memoirist of both French-Canadian and North American Indian descent.

== Life ==
The son of Albina Bisson and Aniclet Plante, Plante is of both French-Canadian and North American Indian descent. He graduated from Boston College and the Université catholique de Louvain. He taught creative writing at Columbia University before retiring. His diary is kept in the Berg Collection of the New York Public Library. His papers are kept in the library of The University of Tulsa, Oklahoma. Plante lives in London, Lucca, Italy, and Athens, Greece. He has American and British dual citizenship.

== Work ==
Plante's novels examine the spiritual in a variety of contexts, but notably in the milieu of large, working-class, Catholic families of French-Canadian background. His male characters range from openly gay to sexually ambiguous and questioning.

Plante's work, for which he has been nominated for the National Book Award, includes Difficult Women (1983), a memoir of his relationships with Jean Rhys, Sonia Orwell, and Germaine Greer and the widely praised Francoeur Trilogy—The Family (1978), The Country (1980) and The Woods (1982). His book The Pure Lover (2009) is a memoir of Nikos Stangos, his partner of forty years. The papers of Nikos Stangos (1936–2004), are in The Princeton University Library, the Program in Hellenic Studies.

He has been published extensively including in The New Yorker and The Paris Review and various literary magazines.

== Honours ==
Plante is a fellow of the Royal Society of Literature, elected in 2002. Among his other honours are: Henfield Fellow, University of East Anglia, 1975; British Arts Council Grant, 1977; Guggenheim Fellowship, 1983; American Academy and Institute of Arts and Letters Award, 1983.

He is an ambassador for the LGBT Committee of the New York Public Library.

He has been a writer-in-residence at Maxim Gorky Literature Institute (Moscow), the Université du Québec à Montréal, Adelphi University, King's College, the University of Cambridge, the University of Tulsa, and the University of East Anglia.

Plante's book The Family was a final selection for the National Book Award in 1979.

== Bibliography ==
- The Ghost of Henry James (1970)
- Slides (novel) (1971)
- Relatives (novel) (1972)
- The Darkness of the Body (1974)
- Figures in Bright Air (1976)
- The Family (1978)
- The Country (1980)
- The Woods (1982)
- Difficult Women (1983)
- The Foreigner (1984)
- The Catholic (1986)
- My Mother's Pearl Necklace (1987)
- The Native (1987)
- The Accident (1991)
- Annunciation (1994)
- Prayer (1998)
- The Age of Terror (1999)
- American Ghosts (2005)
- ABC (2007)
- The Pure Lover (2009)
- Becoming a Londoner : a diary (2013)
- Worlds Apart: a memoir (2015)
- American Stranger (2018)
- Eternity (novel) (2024)
- Fantasies of the Body (novel) (2026)
- The Death of a Greek Lover (2026)
