= Sleep It Off Lady =

- First edition
- Author: Jean Rhys
- Cover artist: Rosemary Honeybourne
- Language: English
- Publisher: André Deutsch (UK); Harper & Row (USA)
- Publication date: October 1976
- Media type: Print (hardback & paperback)
- Pages: 176 pp
- ISBN: 0-233-96818-0

Sleep It Off Lady, originally published in late 1976 by André Deutsch of Great Britain, was famed Dominican author Jean Rhys' final collection of short stories. The sixteen stories in this collection stretch over an approximate 75-year period, starting from the end of the nineteenth century (November 1899) to the present time of writing (c. 1975).

The back cover of the first UK edition features a tribute quote from A. Alvarez, extracted from his 1974 New York Times Book Review article about Rhys, praising her as "simply the best living English novelist..."

== Stories in the collection ==
(a synopsis follows each title)

- " Pioneers, Oh, Pioneers ": At the turn of the twentieth century, a doctor experiences the final hours of an ill-fated estate house bought only days before by his rival.
- "Goodbye Marcus, Goodbye Rose": A captain and his wife pay a visit to Dominica while on vacation in Jamaica for the winter.
- "The Bishop's Feast": A home-born returnee is invited by an old nun to witness the enthronement of a new Bishop in Roseau, before spending a week on Dominica's leeward coast.
- " Heat": The effects of the 1902 eruption of Mount Pelée on Dominica.
- "Fishy Waters": Racial tensions between a British carpenter and local folk erupt into a scandal that eventually finds its way into Roseau's courtroom.
- "Overture and Beginners Please": In this first of four consecutive stories about a pre-World War I Caribbean immigrant named Elsa, the young girl starts at Perse School then becomes a stage star in the midst of an unwanted life.
- "Before the Deluge": Elsa meets a stage girl—a policeman's daughter from Manchester—whose beauty never succeeds while entertaining her audience.
- "On Not Shooting Sitting Birds": An English gentleman rejects Elsa for good after hearing of her past exploits during hunting trips in her homeland.
- "Kikimora": At a first-class hotel, Elsa discovers how perceptive the title character, a black cat, can be, as compared to a husband.
- "Night Out 1925": The experiences of two lovers, Suzy and Gilbert, in the streets of Paris.
- "The Chevalier of the Place Blanche": In the English-language version of a work by the author's first husband, Jean Lenglet (written under his nom-de-plume of Edouard de Nève), the title character shares his desire with a British lady in a 1920s Paris restaurant.
- "The Insect World": An old lady shows a young child the disturbing connections between London Underground dwellers and a tropical insect parasite whose name they share in slang.
- "Rapunzel, Rapunzel": A hospital patient makes a temporary stay at a convalescent home in London, with a long-haired Australian as her neighbour.
- "Who Knows What's Up in the Attic?": A vacationer in south-east England comes face-to-face with a clothing salesman.
- "Sleep It Off Lady": In this story from which the collection takes its name, another old lady faces a rat problem while taking care of her cottage.
- " I Used to Live Here Once": In this final story, the author makes her way across a familiar childhood stream and discovers she is deceased.

== Reception ==
The book was generally well received, with Robie Macauley in The New York Times writing : "The fact that the scenes themselves come from the West Indies or London or Paris of decades past has no real bearing—these are very modern stories written with a quick, young sensibility."

Kirkus Reviews wrote "This is a more incidental collection of short stories than Tigers are Better-Looking (1974) while still retaining the disconsolate allure of everything Jean Rhys has written" and called the collection "A force mineure, but how insistently, inductively, Jean Rhys makes herself felt in the small hours of the morning or at the fag end of the day."

== Previous publications ==
- "Pioneers, Oh Pioneers" in The Times under the title "Dear Darling Mr Ramage"
- "Sleep It Off Lady" in The New Review
- "The Insect World" in The Sunday Times Magazine (UK) and Mademoiselle (USA)
- "Goodbye Marcus, Goodbye Rose" in The New Yorker
- "Heat" in The New Yorker
- "Kikimora" in The New Yorker
- "On Not Shooting Sitting Birds" in The New Yorker
