= Wide Sargasso Sea =

1966 novel by Jean Rhys

- First edition cover
- Author: Jean Rhys
- Cover artist: Eric Thomas
- Language: English
- Genre: Postmodern; Historical
- Set in: Jamaica; Dominica; England
- Publisher: André Deutsch
- Publication date: October 1966
- Publication place: United Kingdom
- Media type: Print
- Pages: 190
- ISBN: 0-233-95866-5
- OCLC: 4248898
- Dewey Decimal: 823.912
- LC Class: PR6035.H96

Wide Sargasso Sea is a 1966 postmodern novel by Dominican-British author Jean Rhys. Set in Jamaica in the 1830s–1840s, the novel is a postcolonial and feminist prequel to Charlotte Brontë's Jane Eyre (1847), detailing the background to Edward Rochester's marriage from the point of view of his wife Bertha Mason, Brontë's "madwoman in the attic", reimagined by Rhys as a Creole heiress named Antoinette Cosway.

Antoinette's story is told from the time of her youth in Jamaica, to her unhappy marriage to an English gentleman, Mr. Rochester, who renames her Bertha, declares her mad, takes her to England, and isolates her from the rest of the world in his mansion. Wide Sargasso Sea explores the power of relationships between men and women and discusses the themes of race, Caribbean history, and assimilation as Antoinette is caught in a white, patriarchal society in which she fully belongs neither to Europe nor to Jamaica.

The book was Rhys's first work after a period of literary obscurity beginning with her novel Good Morning, Midnight (1939). Wide Sargasso Sea led to a revival of interest in Rhys and became her most commercially successful novel. In 2022, it was included on the "Big Jubilee Read" list of 70 books by Commonwealth authors, selected to celebrate the Platinum Jubilee of Elizabeth II.

== Plot ==
=== Overview ===
The novel, initially set in a sugarcane plantation in Jamaica, opens a short while after the Slavery Abolition Act 1833 abolished slavery in the British Empire on 1 August 1834. The protagonist Antoinette relates the story of her life from childhood to her arranged marriage to an English gentleman, Mr. Rochester.

=== Coulibri ===
The first part takes place in Coulibri, a sugar plantation in Jamaica, and is narrated by Antoinette as a child. Formerly wealthy, since the abolition of slavery, the estate has become derelict and her family has been plunged into poverty. Antoinette's widowed Martinican mother, Annette, remarries wealthy English gentleman Mr. Mason, who is hoping to exploit his new wife's situation. Angry at the returning prosperity of the planter class, emancipated slaves living in Coulibri burn down Annette's house, killing Antoinette's mentally disabled younger brother, Pierre. The emancipated slaves threaten the family but are scared away by the sight of the family's pet parrot on fire, as killing a parrot is considered to be bad luck.

Annette had been struggling with her mental health up until this point and the grief of losing her son pushes her further toward insanity. Mr. Mason sends her to live with abusive caregivers, who neglect and sexually assault the mentally fragile woman. When Antoinette visits her after the fire, Annette refuses to see or speak to her. Antoinette visits her mother once more when she is older but is alarmed at the abuse she witnesses by the servants to her mother and goes away without speaking to her.

=== Granbois ===
The second chapter is the longest, alternating between the points of view of Antoinette and her new husband Mr. Rochester on their honeymoon excursion to her mother's summer estate Granbois, Dominica. This chapter traces the gradual souring of their relationship and Antoinette's descent into insanity. Catalysts include the mutual suspicions that develop between the couple, and the machinations of Daniel, who claims he is Antoinette's illegitimate half-brother; he impugns Antoinette's reputation and mental state and demands money to keep quiet. Daniel tells Mr. Rochester about Antoinette's mentally disabled brother and mentally ill mother, and states that Antoinette is on the same path. Antoinette denies or brushes aside Daniel's claims when asked by Mr. Rochester, though that does not alleviate Mr. Rochester's doubts.

Meanwhile, Antoinette feels that Mr. Rochester hates her and just married her for her large estate. Antoinette's old nurse Christophine openly distrusts Mr. Rochester. His apparent belief in the stories about Antoinette's family and past aggravate the situation; her husband is unfaithful and emotionally abusive. He begins to call her Bertha rather than her real name and flaunts an affair in front of her to cause her pain. Antoinette's increased sense of paranoia and the bitter disappointment of her failing marriage unbalance her already precarious mental and emotional state. She flees to the house of Christophine. Antoinette pleads with Christophine for an obeah potion to attempt to reignite her husband's love, which Christophine reluctantly gives her. Antoinette returns home but the love potion ends up poisoning her husband. Subsequently, he hardens his heart against reconciling with his wife and decides to take her away from Granbois.

=== Thornfield Hall ===
The third and final part is the shortest of the novel; it is from the perspective of Antoinette, renamed by her husband as Bertha. Mr. Rochester's father and brother have died, so he has returned to England with Antoinette to claim his sizeable inheritance. She is largely confined to "the attic" of Thornfield Hall, the mansion she calls the "Great House". The story traces her relationship with Grace Poole, the servant who is tasked with guarding her, as well as her disintegrating life with Mr. Rochester, as he hides her from the world. He promises to come to her more but never does.

Antoinette is thought mad by those who interact with her and has little understanding of how much time she has been confined. She dreams of freedom, when she remembers, and writes to her stepbrother Richard in Jamaica who, however, says he cannot "interfere legally" with her husband. Desperate and enraged, she attacks him with a knife bought in secret. She later forgets this encounter. Expressing her thoughts in stream of consciousness, Antoinette dreams of flames engulfing the house and her freedom from the life she has there, and believes it is her destiny to fulfil the vision. Waking from her dream, she escapes her room, and sets out with candle in hand.

== Themes ==
=== Postcolonialism ===
Since the late 20th century, critics have considered Wide Sargasso Sea as a postcolonial response to Charlotte Brontë's 1847 novel Jane Eyre. Rhys uses multiple voices (Antoinette's, her husband's, and Grace Poole's) to tell the story, and intertwines her novel's plot with that of Jane Eyre. In addition, Rhys makes a postcolonial argument when she ties Antoinette's husband's eventual rejection of Antoinette to her Creole heritage (a rejection shown to be critical to Antoinette's descent into madness).

=== Feminism ===
While Rhys did not consider herself to be a feminist, the novel is considered a feminist work in its exploration of gender politics and dynamics. Rhys expands on Brontë's portrayal of Antoinette as the "mad woman in the attic" and provides her with a more complex story and individuality beyond her association with Rochester.

=== Slavery and ethnicity ===
Antoinette and her family were planters who owned slaves until the passage of the Slavery Abolition Act, which resulted in the family losing their wealth. They are pejoratively called "white nigger" or "white cockroach" by the island's Black inhabitants because of their poverty and are openly despised, harassed, and assaulted. The villagers, inadvertently or not, kill Antoinette's brother, setting fire to the home and seem poised to murder the rest of the family if not for the apparition of an ill omen – their dying green parrot. Meanwhile, Rochester looks down on Antoinette because of her status as a Creole. Scholar Lee Erwin describes this paradox through the scene in which Antoinette's childhood home Coulibri is burned down and she runs to Tia, a black girl her own age, to "be like her". Tia attacks Antoinette, throwing a rock at her head. Antoinette then says she sees Tia "as if I saw myself. Like in a looking glass". Erwin argues that "even as she claims to be seeing 'herself,' she is simultaneously seeing 'the other', that which only defines the self by its separation from it, in this case literally by means of a cut. History here, in the person of a former slave's daughter, is figured as refusing Antoinette", the daughter of a slave owner.

In the novel, Rhys also explores the legacy of slavery and the slave trade, focusing on how abolition dramatically affected the status of Antoinette's family as planters in colonial Jamaica. Scholar Trevor Hope has noted that the "triumphant conflagration of Thornfield Hall in Wide Sargasso Sea may at one level mark a vengeful attack upon the earlier textual structure". The destruction of Thornfield Hall occurs in both novels; however, Rhys epitomises the fire as a liberating experience for Antoinette. Hope has suggested that the novel "[takes] residence inside the textual domicile of empire in order to bring about its disintegration or even, indeed, its conflagration".

== Publication and reception ==
Rhys's editor Diana Athill discusses in her 2014 memoir Stet the events surrounding the publication of Wide Sargasso Sea. The book came out of a friendship between Rhys and Selma Vaz Dias, who encouraged her to start writing again. At the time, Rhys was living in a shack made of corrugated iron and tar paper in a slum neighbourhood of Cheriton Fitzpaine, Devon. The book was virtually completed in November 1964, when Rhys, who was 74 years old and complained of the cold and rain in her shack, suffered a heart attack. Athill cared for Rhys in the hospital for two years, keeping a promise not to publish the book until Rhys was well enough to compile the manuscript and add a few final lines. The income from Wide Sargasso Sea provided enough money for Rhys to improve her living conditions. It won the WH Smith Literary Award in 1967, bringing Rhys to public attention after decades of obscurity.

Athill wrote in a foreword to Rhys's posthumously published autobiography Smile Please (1979): "Some five years after the publication of Wide Sargasso Sea she said to me out of the blue: 'There is one thing I've always wanted to ask you. Why did you let me publish that book?'... I asked her what on earth she meant. 'It was not finished,' she said coldly. She then pointed out the existence in the book of two unnecessary words. One was 'then', the other 'quite'."

In 2018, writer and broadcaster Afua Hirsch described Wide Sargasso Sea as "one of the most perfect books ever written in the English language."

== Accolades ==
- 1967 – Winner of the WH Smith Literary Award.
- 1998 – Ranked among the 100 Best Novels by Modern Library, at number 94.
- 2006 – Winner of the Cheltenham Prize for Literature, year 1966.
- 2005 – Ranked among the 100 Best English-Language Novels Since 1923 by Time magazine.
- 2015 – Ranked among the 100 Greatest British Novels by BBC Culture, at number 53.
- 2019 – Ranked among the 100 Most Inspiring Novels by BBC Arts, under Class & Society.
- 2022 – Ranked among the 70 Big Jubilee Read books by the Reading Agency.
- 2022 – Ranked among the 50 Best Novels of the Past 70 Years by The Times, at number 10.

== Adaptations ==
- 1991 – Sargasso: A Caribbean Love Story, a hybrid film adaptation also telling the life story of Rhys, directed by Michael Gilkes.
- 1993 – Wide Sargasso Sea, a film adaptation directed by John Duigan and starring Karina Lombard and Nathaniel Parker.
- 1997 – Wide Sargasso Sea, a chamber opera adaptation directed by Douglas Horton, with music by Australian composer Brian Howard.
- 2004 – Wide Sargasso Sea, a BBC Radio 4 10-part adaptation by Margaret Busby, read by Adjoa Andoh (repeated in 2012, 2014 and 2019).
- 2006 – Wide Sargasso Sea, a television movie adaptation directed by Brendan Maher and starring Rebecca Hall and Rafe Spall.
- 2011 – "Wide Sargasso Sea", a song written by American singer Stevie Nicks, from her 2011 album In Your Dreams.
- 2016 – Wide Sargasso Sea, a BBC Radio 4 one-hour dramatization by Rebecca Lenkiewicz (repeated in 2020).

== See also ==
- Sargasso Sea
