= Voyage in the Dark =

1934 British novel

- First edition
- Author: Jean Rhys
- Publisher: Constable Press
- Publication date: 1934
- Media type: Print

Voyage in the Dark was written in 1934 by Jean Rhys. It tells of the semi-tragic descent of its young protagonist Anna Morgan, who is moved from her Caribbean home to England by an uncaring stepmother, after the death of her father. Once she leaves school, and she is cut off financially by the stepmother, Hester, Anna tries to support herself as a chorus girl, then becomes involved with an older man named Walter who supports her financially. When he leaves her, she begins a downward spiral. Like William Faulkner's The Wild Palms, the novel features a botched illegal abortion. Rhys' original version of Voyage in the Dark ended with Anna dying from this abortion (see Bonnie Kime Scott's The Gender of Modernism for the original ending), but she revised it before publication to the more ambivalent and modernist ending in which Anna survives to return to her now-shattered life "all over again." The novel is rich in Caribbean folklore and tradition and post-colonial identity politics, including black self-identification by its white protagonist.

== Plot summary ==
=== Part One ===
1. Anna compares England to her Caribbean, where everything was colourful. By contrast, England is greyish. She dislikes England throughout the novel, always feeling like an outsider. She is always cold and describes all of the towns that she tours as part of a chorus line as identical. The book begins with Anna living in Southsea with a friend, Maudie. The two have trouble persuading a landlady to take them in, the implication being that chorus girls are 'professionals' or prostitutes. The landlady complains about the way that they walk around in their dressing gowns. Anna goes for a walk with Maudie, and they meet two men whom they take back to their flat for some tea, much to their landlady's disgust. When Anna goes to London, she agrees to meet one of the men, Walter.
2. Walter takes her to dinner in a restaurant with a private dining room and a bedroom attached, a place meant to be used for illicit rendezvous. His wealth is obvious. After a meal, he makes a pass at Anna, and she goes into the bedroom, shuts the door and lies down on the bed for a long time. She is nervous as she has never had sex before, but is interested in becoming sexual with Walter, but does not know how to go about it. Anna returns to the room where Walter is waiting for her. They exchange remarks and he walks her outside to stop a taxi and pay her fare. The next day she receives some money in a letter from him, in which he apologizes. She goes out to buy some clothes with the money. Back home she becomes ill and sends him a letter asking him to visit. Walter visits, buys her food and a warm coverlet for her bed, and pays a doctor to see her.
3. Anna visits Walter again, and when he puts his hand on her knee, says that she must go, and begins to cry. But he tells her to be brave and they end up going to bed together. She loses her virginity.
4. Anna is now supported as a "kept woman"; she moves to better quarters and waits all day for letters from Walter arranging meeting times. She has fallen in love with him. One day a letter arrives from Maudie, saying that she will visit soon, and they go for a walk in Hyde Park.
5. Anna goes to visit Walter and meets Vincent, his cousin. She tells Walter she doesn't like him and then begins to tell him about her early life in the Caribbean. They make love, and she lies awake.
6. Anna goes to visit her stepmother, Hester, who tells her that there is no more money for her from her father's Caribbean estate, which Hester has sold. Hester also explains that she sent a letter to Anna's Uncle Bo saying Anna would be better off in the Caribbean, but that he would need to pay half of her fare to get there. Uncle Bo's reply accuses Hester of cheating Anna out of her inheritance, which Hester denies vehemently. She argues she cannot afford to help Anna financially any longer, and that it is her uncle's responsibility. Hester states that she does not approve of Anna's uncle because he is open in his acceptance of both the black and white children in his family, and gives all the children the family's last name. Her abhorrence of miscegenation is depicted negatively in the text, as a sign of her intolerant bigotry, for her major concern is the appearance of impropriety and not the impropriety itself. Hester doesn't approve of black-white friendship at all; we learn that she got very annoyed when Anna got too close to the black servant, Francine, and eventually had her sent away. Anna's uncle, in turn, doesn't approve of Hester, accusing her of mismanaging her husband's property and failing to support Anna.
7. Anna is desperately afraid that Walter will get bored and leave her. One day he takes her to the country for what is at first a wonderful time. The trip is cut short, however, when Vincent and his French lover, who have joined them, fall out and decide to leave early. Walter tells Anna that the reason for the argument was because Walter is taking Vincent when he goes to the US for a while … the first time that Anna has heard of the trip.
8. Anna receives a letter from Vincent saying that Walter is sorry, but he is no longer in love with her. They both still want to assist her as much as possible.
9. Anna asks Walter to meet her, despite the fact that Vincent has said it is better that they don't see each other. She tries to get him to take her home, but he will not, so they part. Anna decides to break from him altogether, and she leaves the lodging he has paid for without leaving a forwarding address.

=== Part Two ===
1. Anna sells some clothing to raise money to pay her rent. In her new accommodations, she meets a woman called Ethel who is only there, she tells Anna, while her new place is being refurnished. They go to the pictures together, and Ethel, who runs a manicure and massage business, offers Anna accommodation and a job.
2. One day Anna goes out and meets Laurie by chance, along with two American boyfriends of hers, Carl and Joe. They go out for drinks and get a little tipsy.
3. They go out again to a hotel. It is implied that Laurie is a prostitute, and Anna goes into hysterics, and throws a scene.
4. Joe tried to have sex with Anna, but Anna refused angrily.
5. Anna goes and visits Ethel, and is taken up as the manicurist, even though she has no experience.

=== Part Three ===
1. Anna isn't very good at her job. Ethel is obviously running a bit of a racket. Her adverts are suggestive, but not explicitly so, so that the men arrive expecting more than a massage, and when they don't get it there is nothing that they can do. One day Ethel's massage table breaks and the man on it jumps off into some hot water and injures himself. Anna doesn't show much sympathy, and Ethel becomes angry. She tells Anna that she is too moody, no good at the job, and never invites Ethel along when she goes out. It appears that Ethel had expected that Anna might prostitute herself and that Ethel expected to act as a madam, though she does not say this explicitly. She orders Anna to leave, then quickly reverses her decision and begs her to stay. Anna says that she must go for a walk, and Ethel tells her that if she is not back within an hour she will gas herself. She goes halfway to Walter's place and then returns to find a very relieved Ethel.
2. Anna is ill. When she meets up with Laurie, one of her boyfriends, Carl Redman, asks her if she is on ether. She ends up going to sleep with him.
3. Ethel is inquisitive about Carl and doesn't seem to disapprove. Carl tells Anna that he is leaving the country soon; both he and Joe have wives in the States. One day Anna meets Maudie, who borrows some money. She needs to buy new clothes or else she thinks the man she is going out with won't marry her.
4. Anna almost ends up going to bed with a man with a broken hand. While they are dancing in her bedroom at Ethel's, Anna throws her shoe at a picture of a dog she imagines is smirking at her, shattering the glass. Soon after she has a fit of morning sickness, and when the man won't release her from his grip she hits him on his injured hand, and throws up. He leaves.
5. Anna is now staying with Laurie, who has received a 'peach of a letter' from Ethel, saying that Anna owes her money for destroying her room. She also mentions that Anna was bringing many men back to the apartment, which she could not stand, and also that she has become aware that Anna is pregnant. Anna and Laurie discuss the possibilities of an abortion. Anna has waited too long to seek this abortion, ambivalently wishing to keep the baby she cannot support, while also drinking concoctions that are supposed to induce abortion.
6. Laurie and Anna meet up with Vincent to arrange the money for the abortion. He assures her that everything will be all right, but commands Anna to return the letters between her and Walter, which she does.
7. Anna goes to Mrs. Robinson's and has the abortion.

=== Part Four ===
1. The abortion is botched, and Anna becomes extremely ill. Anna hears Laurie talking to her new landlady, Mrs Polo about her condition. She is still unwell. She hallucinates, her mind fills with scenes of the masquerade in the Caribbean of her childhood, recent seductions, and the dark room that she is in. A doctor comes to attend her and says, "She'll be alright […] Ready to start all over again in no time, I've no doubt." The last paragraph returns to Anna's stream of consciousness narrative voice pondering repeatedly the idea of "all over again."
