= Smile Please: An Unfinished Autobiography =

1979 posthumous autobiography of Jean Rhys

- First UK edition
- Editor: Diana Athill
- Author: Jean Rhys
- Publisher: Andre Deutsch Ltd
- Publication date: 1979
- Publication place: United Kingdom
- Media type: Print

Smile Please: An Unfinished Autobiography is a posthumously published, unfinished autobiographical work written by Dominican author Jean Rhys. It was first published in 1979 by Andre Deutsch Ltd (London) and Harper & Row (New York City). The book was edited by and contained an introduction by Rhys's editor, Diana Athill.

The first part of the book consists of the account of Rhys's childhood in Dominica. The second part of the book consists of drafts about her adult life, ending in 1923. A photographic section divides the two parts.
