= Journal of Modern Literature =

- Discipline: literature
- Language: English

Publication details
- History: 1977 to present
- Publisher: Indiana University Press (United States)
- Frequency: Quarterly

Standard abbreviations
- ISO 4: J. Mod. Lit.

Indexing
- ISSN: 0022-281X (print); 1529-1464 (web)
- JSTOR: jmodelite

Links
- Journal homepage; Projet MUSE

The Journal of Modern Literature is a quarterly peer-reviewed literary journal covering studies of literature in any language produced after 1900. It was established in 1977 at Temple University; since 1996, it has been published by Indiana University Press, who purchased the journal in 2000.

== Abstracting and indexing ==
The journal is abstracted and indexed by:

- MLA Bibliography
- EBSCO databases
- ProQuest databases
- Humanities Index
