= Carole Angier =

English biographer

Carole Angier FRSL
- Born: 30 October 1943 (age 82); London, England
- Education: McGill University; University of Oxford; University of Cambridge
- Occupation: Biographer

Carole Angier FRSL (born 30 October 1943) is an English biographer. She was born in London and was raised in Canada before moving back to the UK in her early twenties. She spent many years as a teacher, including periods at the Open University and Birkbeck College, University of London. In 2002, she was elected a Fellow of the Royal Society of Literature. She was educated at McGill, Oxford and Cambridge.

She is known for her acclaimed biographies of the writers Jean Rhys and Primo Levi. The former was shortlisted for the 1991 Whitbread Biography Award, and won the 1991 Writers' Guild Award for Non-Fiction. Her biography Speak, Silence: In Search of W. G. Sebald was published in 2021.

Angier speaks Italian, French and German, and lives in Oxfordshire. She was a friend of Diana Athill who was her editor for a time.

== Publications ==
- Jean Rhys: Life & Work (1985)
- The Double Bond: A Life of Primo Levi (2002)
- The Story of My Life: refugees writing in Oxford (2005)
- Lyla and Majnon: poems of Hasan Bamyani (2008)
- See How I Land: Oxford poets and exiled writers (2009)
- (with Sally Cline): The Arvon Book of Life Writing (2010)
- Speak, Silence: In Search of W. G. Sebald (2021)
