= Jean Rhys =

British novelist (1890–1979)

Jean Rhys CBE
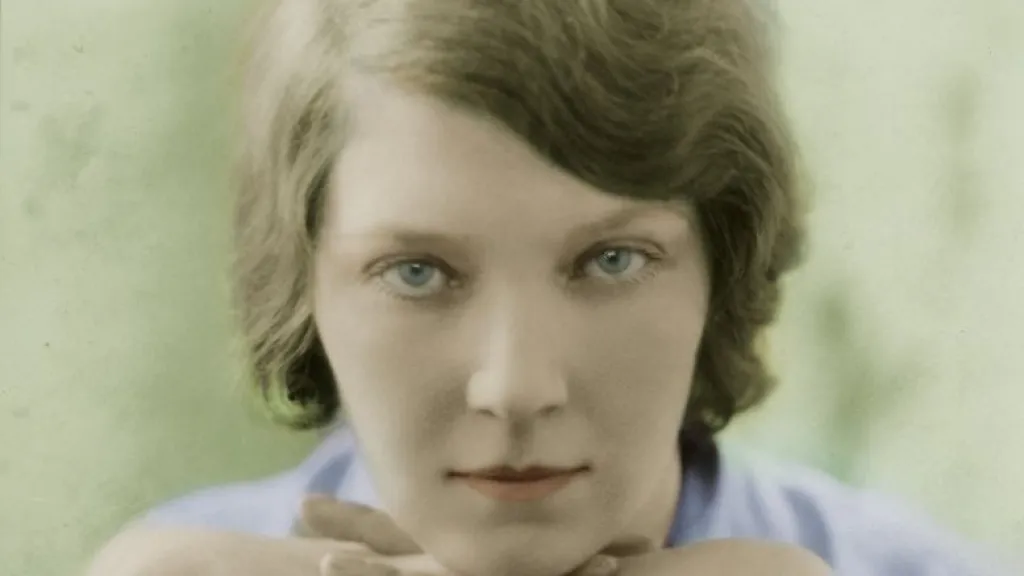
- Rhys in c. 1921
- Born: Ella Gwendoline Rees Williams; 24 August 1890; Roseau or Grand Bay, British Leeward Islands (now Dominica)
- Died: 14 May 1979 (aged 88); Exeter, Devon, England
- Occupations: Novelist, short story writer, essayist
- Spouses: Jean Lenglet (m. 1919; div. 1933) Leslie Tilden-Smith (m. 1934; died 1945) Max Hamer (m. 1947; died 1966)
- Children: 2
- Writing career
- Genres: Modernism, postmodernism
- Notable works: Good Morning, Midnight (1939); Wide Sargasso Sea (1966)

Jean Rhys (/riːs/ REESS; born Ella Gwendoline Rees Williams; 24 August 1890 – 14 May 1979) was a British Creole novelist who was born and grew up in the Caribbean island of Dominica. From the age of 16, she resided mainly in England, where she was sent for her education. She is best known for her final novel, Wide Sargasso Sea (1966), written as a prequel to Charlotte Brontë's Jane Eyre.

Rhys started writing intermittently around 1914, and found a literary mentor in Ford Madox Ford (with whom she also had an affair) in 1923. With his assistance and encouragement, her first work of fiction—The Left Bank and Other Stories—was published in 1927. This was followed by four short semi-autobiographical novels about women navigating perilous circumstances across London and Paris: Quartet (1928), After Leaving Mr. Mackenzie (1931), Voyage in the Dark (1934), and Good Morning, Midnight (1939). After these publications failed to lead to significant financial or critical success, Rhys felt her writing career had stalled, and largely withdrew from public life.

Following the publication of Wide Sargasso Sea, Rhys experienced a resurgence in popularity, and much of her earlier work was republished. Two further volumes of short stories followed, and her incomplete autobiography was published posthumously. In 1978, she was appointed a Commander of the Order of the British Empire (CBE) for her writing, just before her death in 1979.

== Early life ==
=== Family heritage ===
Rhys's father, William Rees Williams (b. 1853), was a Welsh ship's medical doctor when, at the age of 27, he arrived in Dominica. In 1882, a year after he was established on the island, he married Minna Williams, née Lockhart (b. 1853), a third-generation white Dominican Creole of Scots ancestry. ("Creole" was broadly used in those times to refer to any person born on the island, whether they were of European or African descent, or both.) Rhys's maternal grandmother, born Jean Maxwell, may have had some Spanish ancestry.

Her mother's family had at one time been wealthy sugarcane plantation owners. Rhys's great-grandfather, James Potter Lockhart, had in 1824 purchased a 1,200-acre (485 hectares) estate that included 258 slaves. Rhys's cousins included mixed-race descendants of offspring that James Lockhart had sired with enslaved women. Though slavery was abolished in 1834, Rhys's grandfather Edward Lockhart organized the brutal suppression of an 1844 rebellion by exploited black laborers.

Five of the six children borne by Minna Williams survived to adulthood. Edward and Owen were the eldest. Third in birth order was Minna (named after her mother). Rhys was the fourth, called Gwen by her family, and born a year later. A fifth child, christened Brenda Gwenith, died in infancy. Brenda Clarice, born 1895, was the youngest of the five surviving children.

=== Class and race on Dominica ===
At the time of Rhys's birth in 1890, Dominica had been a possession of the British Empire for almost 100 years. The white population on the island numbered 300, and the black and indigenous people numbered 30,000, many of them were formerly enslaved.

The white colonial residents were strongly Anglophilic, though Rhys was herself of Welsh, Scottish and Irish background, rather than English. Rhys's father, Rees, was egalitarian in his medical practice, providing treatment to both white and black patients, and socialized with both rich and poor members of the community. While her father was content to see his daughter mix interracially, her mother Minna insisted she cultivate relationships with the well-to-do English children who visited the island. British subjects disparaged colonial whites, termed "Creoles"—identifiable by their distinctive accents.

=== Primary education ===
Rhys, after a late start, became an avid reader, a trait that her father's side of the family encouraged. Besides selections from the poetry of Byron and Milton, she read Treasure Island, Gulliver's Travels, and Robinson Crusoe. Her mother Minna was decidedly hostile to her daughter's interest in literature. During this period, until the age of 12, Rhys was subject to beating with a whip administered by her mother, sometimes arbitrarily. The house servant, Meta, subjected her to cruel practical jokes. At the age of nine, Rhys was sent by her father to the Roseau Catholic convent as a day student.

== Schooling in England ==
Rhys was educated in Dominica until the age of 16, when she was sent to England to live with an aunt, as her relations with her mother were difficult. She attended the Perse School for Girls in Cambridge, where she was mocked as an outsider and for her accent. She attended two terms at the Royal Academy of Dramatic Art in London by 1909. Her instructors despaired of her ever learning to speak "proper English" and advised her father to take her away. Unable to train as an actress and refusing to return to the Caribbean as her parents wished, Rhys worked with varied success as a chorus girl, adopting the names Vivienne, Emma, or Ella Gray. She toured Britain's small towns and returned to rooming or boarding houses in rundown neighbourhoods of London.

After her father died in 1910, Rhys appears to have experimented with living as an artist's model after she became the mistress of wealthy stockbroker Lancelot Grey Hugh Smith, whose father Hugh Colin Smith had been Governor of the Bank of England. Though a bachelor, Smith did not offer to marry Rhys, and their affair soon ended. However, he continued to be an occasional source of financial help.

During the First World War, Rhys served as a volunteer worker in a soldiers' canteen. In 1918, she worked in a pension office to help the families of dead or wounded soldiers and sailors.

== Marriage and family ==
In 1919, Rhys married Willem Johan Marie (Jean) Lenglet, a French-Dutch journalist, spy, and songwriter. He was the first of her three husbands. She and Lenglet lived in Paris, where their baby son died, then lived in Vienna and Budapest, before returning to Paris. Their daughter, Maryvonne Moerman (née Lenglet), was born in Ukkel, Belgium, in 1922. Rhys left her two-week old daughter in a clinic at Ukkel when she went to London to procure money. It was not until November that she was able to retrieve Maryvonne. Refusing to put her daughter up for adoption, the girl was placed in a number of orphanages until she was reunited with her parents in 1927.

In 1924, the year that the newly named Jean Rhys was discovered and published by the English writer Ford Madox Ford, Lenglet was imprisoned for embezzlement. The couple eventually divorced in 1933, but remained loyal to each other's work, while sharing care of their daughter.

The next year, Rhys married Leslie Tilden-Smith, an English agent and editor. In 1936, they went briefly to Dominica, the first time Rhys had returned since she had left for school.

Her brother Owen was living in England, and she took care of some financial affairs for him, making a settlement with a mixed-race woman on the island and Owen's illegitimate children by her. The visit exerted a powerful influence on Rhys's most famous novel, Wide Sargasso Sea (1966).

In 1937, Rhys began a friendship with novelist Eliot Bliss (who had adopted that first name in honour of an admired writer, T. S. Eliot). The two women shared Caribbean backgrounds. The correspondence between them survives. Rhys also became close to Phyllis Shand Allfrey, whose family also lived in Dominica.

Rhys and Tilden-Smith lived in London through World War II, while Rhys agonised over the possible fate of her daughter, who was living in Amsterdam (Maryvonne had joined the Dutch Resistance and married a fellow fighter against fascism). Tilden-Smith died in 1945. In 1947, Rhys married Max Hamer, a solicitor who was a cousin of Tilden-Smith. He was convicted of fraud and imprisoned after their marriage. Rhys remained loyal to him throughout, while their lives descended into conditions of extreme poverty, including even the hold of a boat and a horsebox. They settled in 1960, in a cottage in Cheriton Fitzpaine, purchased for Rhys by her oldest brother, Edward. Max Hamer died in 1966, the year in which Wide Sargasso Sea began a remarkable change in Rhys's fortunes.

Her daughter, now Mrs. Maryvonne Moerman-Lenglet, survived the war.

== Writing career ==
"I can’t make things up. I can’t invent. I have no imagination. I can’t invent characters. I don't think I know what character is. I will just write about what happened. Not that my books are entirely my life—but almost." —Jean Rhys interview with David Plante in Difficult Women: a Memoir of Three (1983).

"Much that has been published about Rhys since her spectacular resurrection tends to treat her not as a conscious artist but as simply the desperate, suffering woman depicted in her novels. Because the tone of her fiction is that of someone simply talking to the reader—or railing at the reader, or crying out to the reader—people have tended to treat her as a naïf, a sort of primitive with an uncanny knack for self-expression. Nothing could be further from the truth."—Biographer Evelyn Toynton in The American Scholar (Spring 1992)

In 1924, Rhys came under the influence of Ford Madox Ford. After meeting Ford in Paris, Rhys wrote short stories under his patronage. Ford recognised that her experience as an exile gave Rhys a unique viewpoint, and praised her "singular instinct for form". "Coming from the West Indies, [Ford] declared, 'with a terrifying insight and ... passion for stating the case of the underdog, she has let her pen loose on the Left Banks of the Old World'." This he wrote in his preface to her debut short story collection, The Left Bank and Other Stories (1927).

It was Ford who suggested she change her name from Ella Williams to Jean Rhys. At the time, her husband was in jail for what Rhys described as currency irregularities. Rhys moved in with Ford and his long-time partner Stella Bowen. An affair with Ford ensued, which she portrayed in fictionalised form in her novel Quartet (1928). Her protagonist is a stranded foreigner, Marya Zelli, who finds herself at the mercy of strangers when her husband is jailed in Paris. The 1981 film adaptation of the novel was produced by Merchant Ivory Productions.

In After Leaving Mr. Mackenzie (1931), the protagonist, Julia Martin, is a more unravelled version of Marya Zelli, romantically dumped and inhabiting the pavements, cafes and cheap hotel rooms of Paris.

With Voyage in the Dark (1934), Rhys continued to portray a mistreated, rootless woman. Here the narrator, Anna, is a young chorus girl who grew up in the West Indies and feels alienated in England.

Good Morning, Midnight (1939) is considered a continuation of Rhys's first two novels. Here, she uses modified stream of consciousness to voice the experiences of an ageing woman, Sasha Jansen, who drinks, takes sleeping pills, and obsesses over her looks, and is adrift again in Paris. Good Morning, Midnight, acknowledged as well written but deemed depressing, came as World War II broke out and readers sought optimism. This seemingly ended Rhys's literary career.

In the 1940s, Rhys largely withdrew from public life. From 1955 to 1960, she lived in Bude, Cornwall, where she was unhappy, calling it "Bude the Obscure" (a reference to Thomas Hardy's novel Jude the Obscure), before moving to Cheriton Fitzpaine, a small village in Devon.

After a long absence from the public eye, she was rediscovered in Beckenham, South London, by Selma Vaz Dias, who in 1949 placed an advertisement in the New Statesman asking about her whereabouts, with a view to obtaining the rights to adapt her novel Good Morning, Midnight for radio.

Rhys responded, and thereafter developed a long-lasting and collaborative friendship with Vaz Dias, who encouraged her to start writing again. This encouragement ultimately led to the publication in 1966 of her critically acclaimed novel Wide Sargasso Sea. She intended it as an account of the woman whom Rochester married and kept in his attic in Jane Eyre. Begun well before Rhys settled in Bude, the book won the notable WH Smith Literary Award in 1967.

She returned to themes of dominance and dependence, especially in marriage, depicting the mutually painful relationship between a privileged English man and a Creole woman from Jamaica made powerless on being duped and coerced by him and others. Both the man and the woman enter marriage under mistaken assumptions about the other partner. Her female lead marries Mr. Rochester and deteriorates in England as the "madwoman in the attic". Rhys portrays this woman from a quite different perspective from the one in Jane Eyre. Diana Athill as chief editor of André Deutsch gambled on publishing Wide Sargasso Sea, as well as reissuing Rhys's earlier books. Athill and the writer Francis Wyndham helped to revive interest in Rhys's work. There have been film, operatic and radio adaptations of the book.

In 1968, Deutsch published a collection of Rhys's short stories, Tigers Are Better-Looking, of which eight were written during her 1950s period of obscurity and nine republished from her 1927 collection The Left Bank and Other Stories. Her 1969 short story "I Spy a Stranger", published by Penguin Modern Stories, was adapted for TV in 1972 for the BBC's Thirty-Minute Theatre starring Mona Washbourne, Noel Dyson, Hanah Maria Pravda, and Basil Dignam. In 1976, Deutsch published another collection of her short stories, Sleep It Off Lady, consisting of 16 pieces from an approximately 75-year period, starting from the end of the 19th century.

== Later years ==
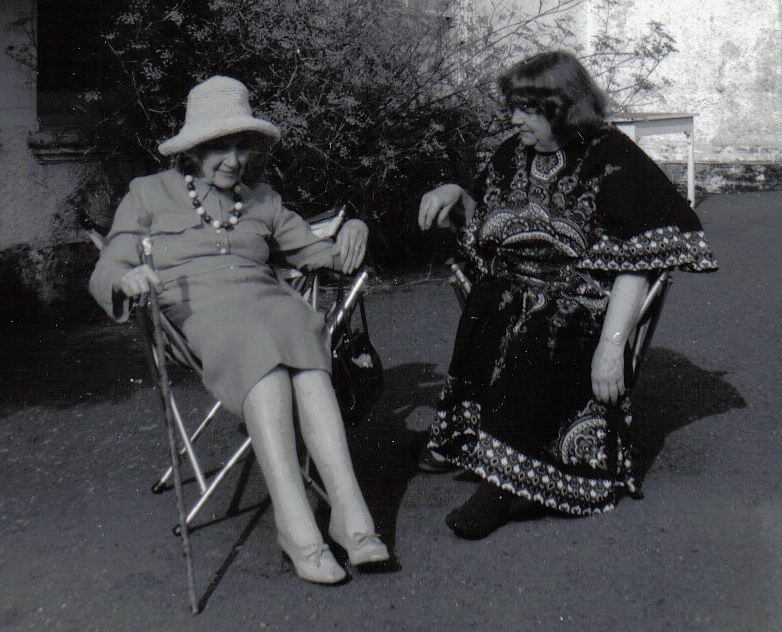
Rhys (left) with Mollie Stoner (right), 1970s

From 1960, and for the rest of her life, Rhys lived in Cheriton Fitzpaine in Devon, once described by her as "a dull spot which even drink can't enliven much." Characteristically, she remained unimpressed by her belated ascent to literary fame, commenting, "It has come too late." In an interview shortly before her death, she questioned whether any novelist, not least herself, could ever be happy for any length of time: "If I could choose I would rather be happy than write... if I could live my life all over again, and choose...."

== Death ==
Jean Rhys died in Exeter on 14 May 1979, at the age of 88, before completing an autobiography that she had begun dictating only months earlier. In 1979, the incomplete text was published posthumously under the title Smile Please: An Unfinished Autobiography.

== Feminist assessments ==
"The experiences of being a colonial and a hapless demimondaine, a discarded or about to-be-discarded mistress, are the central ones of her fiction, which depicts the degradations of the latter state in particular with such mocking lucidity that it is no wonder her work was considered 'sordid' by her own generation and was later acclaimed by the feminists—to her alarm—as a political statement."—Critic Evelyn Toynton in The American Scholar (Spring 1992)

Despite numerous critiques praising her as a feminist social critic, Rhys’s feminist credentials have been disputed by a number of biographers. As much of Rhys’ fiction deals with marginalized and sexually alienated women, questions have raised questions as to whether she qualifies as a genuine feminist. Critic Laura Neisen de Abruna argues that an examination of Rhys’s personal correspondence, autobiographical entries, as well as her fiction, indicates that she was “anti-feminist” in her personal and literary orientation. On Rhys’s female characters de Abruna writes:

Except in her last novel Wide Sargasso Sea (1966)] Rhys’s fictional women never seek a solution to their isolation in relationships with other women. Either the thought does not occur to them, or the women they meet are more ruthless, vicious, and competitive than the men.

Biographer and literary critic Linda Bamber points to the limits of Rhys’s social analysis; her female protagonists register cynical resentment at being an "outsider", without identifying the "sexual politics or class oppression" as the source of their suffering. Critic Carol Ann Howells describes Rhys's female heroines as victims who, while complicit in her own oppression, provide “radical investigations of the social and psychological constructions of gender”—without identifying their suffering generally to women.

Biographer Nancy J. Leigh considers Rhys more than merely a chronicler of female victimization, where "to be a woman…is to be a victim." Rhys also offers stylistically engaging insights into “the forces that shape women’s identities.”

== Legacy and honours ==
In an appreciation in the New York Times Book Review in 1974, A. Alvarez called Jean Rhys "quite simply, the best living English novelist".

Jean Rhys was appointed a CBE in the 1978 New Year Honours.

Australian filmmaker John Duigan directed a 1993 erotic drama, Wide Sargasso Sea, based on Rhys's best-known novel.

Exeter-based novelist and poet Alexis Lykiard, who befriended Rhys in the last decade of her life, published the memoir Jean Rhys Revisited in 2000.

The 2003 book and stage play After Mrs Rochester by Polly Teale is based on the life of Jean Rhys and her book, Wide Sargasso Sea.

A biography of Rhys, entitled The Blue Hour, referencing her favourite French perfume "L'Heure Bleue", was published by Lilian Pizzichini in 2009.

In 2012, English Heritage marked her Chelsea flat at Paulton House in Paultons Square with a blue plaque.

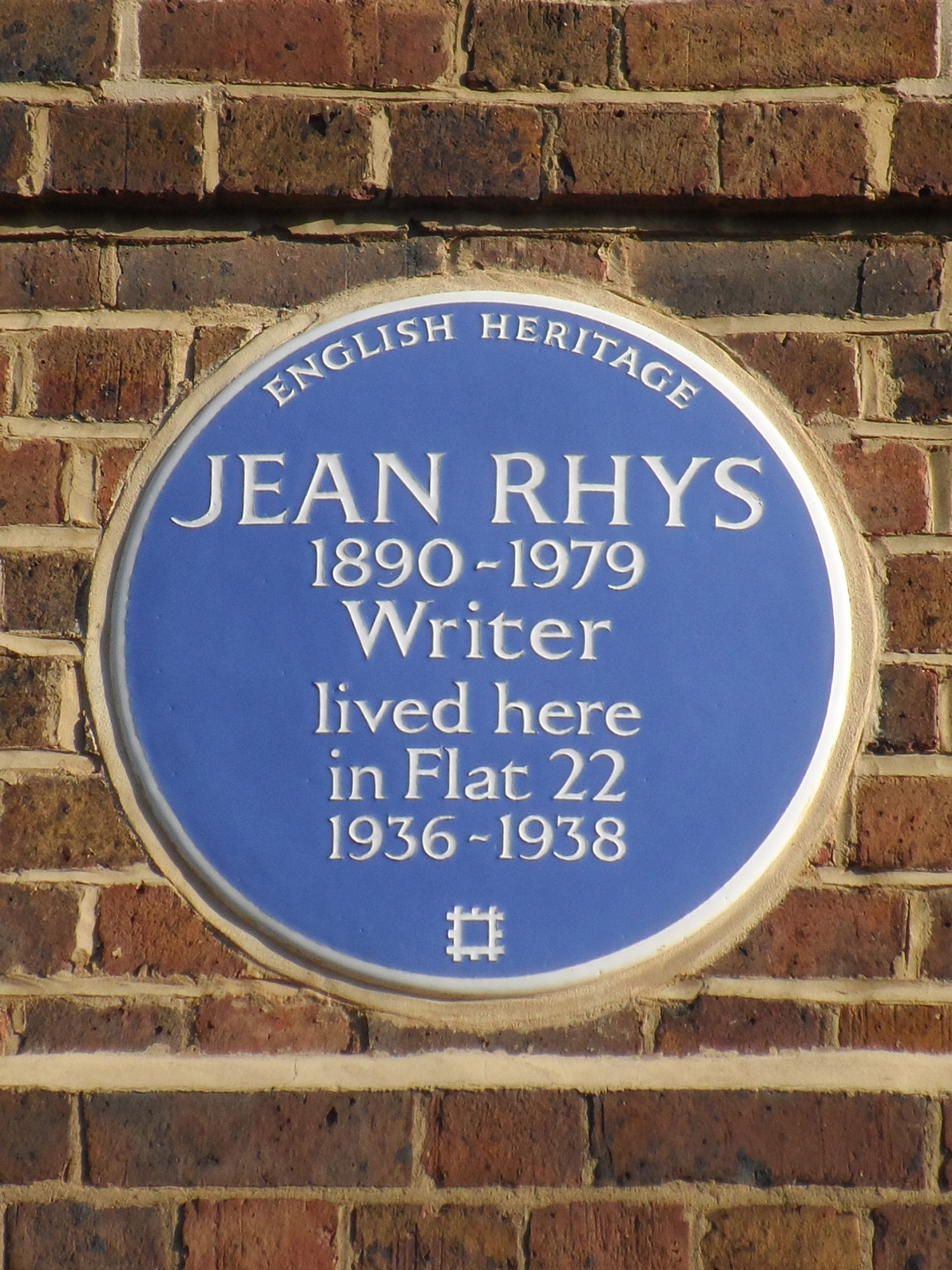
The blue plaque at her Chelsea flat in 2015

In 2020, a pen allegedly owned by Rhys – a devotee of the ballpoint – was added to the Royal Society of Literature's historic collection for the signing of their Roll Book.

In 2022, the biography I Used to Live Here Once: The Haunted Life of Jean Rhys, written by Miranda Seymour, was published.

=== Archives ===
Rhys's collected papers and ephemera are housed in the University of Tulsa's McFarlin Library. The British Library acquired a selection of Jean Rhys Papers in 1972, including drafts of short stories, novels; After Leaving Mr. Mackenzie, Voyage in the Dark, and Wide Sargasso Sea, and an unpublished play entitled English Harbour. Research material relating to Jean Rhys can also be found in the Archive of Margaret Ramsey Ltd at the British Library relating to stage and film rights for adaptations to her work. The British Library also holds correspondence between Jean Rhys and Patrick Garland relating to his adaptation of "I Spy a Stranger" and about Quartet.

== Select bibliography ==
=== Novels ===
- Postures, novel, London: Chatto & Windus, 1928 (published in the US as Quartet, 1929)
- After Leaving Mr. Mackenzie, novel, London: Jonathan Cape, 1931
- Voyage in the Dark, novel, London: Constable Press, 1934
- Good Morning, Midnight, novel, London: Constable, 1939
- Wide Sargasso Sea, novel, London: André Deutsch, 1966
- Early Novels, London: André Deutsch, 1984, ISBN 978-0233977225
- The Complete Novels, W. W. Norton & Co., 1985, ISBN 978-0393022261

=== Collected short stories ===
- The Left Bank and Other Stories, 1927
- Tigers Are Better-Looking. With a selection from The Left Bank, 1968
- Penguin Modern Stories 1 (with Bernard Malamud, David Plante, and William Sansom), 1969
- My Day: Three Pieces (1975), ISBN 978-9995287139
- Sleep It Off Lady (London: André Deutsch, 1976), ISBN 0-233-96818-0
- Tales of the Wide Caribbean, stories, 1985, ISBN 978-0435987497
- Jean Rhys: The Collected Short Stories, 1987
- Let Them Call It Jazz [collection of three tales] (1985), ISBN 9780146000591

=== Autobiography/Letters ===
- Smile Please: An Unfinished Autobiography (1979)
- Jean Rhys: Letters 1931–1966 (1984)

== Sources ==
- Angier, Carole. 1990. Jean Rhys: Life and Work. Boston, Toronto, London: Little, Brown and Company, ISBN 0-316-04263-3
- Athill, Diana. 1987. Introduction to Jean Rhys: The Collected Short Stories, pp. vii–x. New York, London: W. W. Norton & Company, ISBN 0-393-30625-9
- Bamber, Linda. 1982. "Jean Rhys". Partisan Review 49, (1982): 94. Pp. 92–100
- de Aburna, Laura Neisen. 1987. "Jean Rhys and Modernism: A Different Voice". Jean Rhys Review 1 (Spring 1987): 32, 40, And: "Jean Rhys's Feminism: Theory Against Practice". 1988. World Literature Written in English 28 no. 2, (1988) 327 in Jean Rhys: A Study of the Short Fiction, pp. 128–129. Twayne Publishers, Simon & Schuster, New York. ISBN 0-8057-0855-3
- Howells, Carol Ann. 1991. Jean Rhys. New York: St. Martin’s Press, p. 13 ISBN 978-0710812216 in Jean Rhys: A Study of the Short Fiction, p. 130. Twayne Publishers, Simon & Schuster] New York. ISBN 0-8057-0855-3
- Leigh, Nancy J. 1985. "Mirror, Mirror: The Development of Female Identity in Jean Rhys's Fiction". World Literature Written in English 25, no. 2 (1985). 271 in Jean Rhys: A Study of the Short Fiction, pp. 129–130. Twayne Publishers, Simon & Schuster, New York. ISBN 0-8057-0855-3
- Malcolm, Chery Alexander and Malcolm, David. 1996. Jean Rhys: A Study of the Short Fiction. New York: Twayne Publishers, Simon & Schuster. ISBN 0-8057-0855-3
- Rhys, Jean. 1987. Jean Rhys: The Collected Short Stories. New York, London: W. W. Norton & Company. ISBN 0-393-30625-9
- Seymour, Miranda. I Used to Live Here Once: The Haunted Life of Jean Rhys. New York: W. W. Norton & Company. ISBN 978-1-324-00612-1
- Toynton, Evelyn. 1992. "Life into Art". Review of Jean Rhys: Life and Work by Carole Angier, in The American Scholar, Spring 1992, Vol. 61, No. 2 (Spring 1992), pp. 298, 300–302. The Phi Beta Kappa Society. Accessed 10 January 2026.
