= Look at the Harlequins! =

1974 novel by Vladimir Nabokov

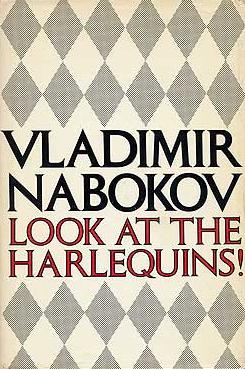
- First edition
- Author: Vladimir Nabokov
- Language: English
- Publisher: McGraw-Hill Companies
- Publication date: 1974
- Publication place: United States
- Pages: 253
- ISBN: 0070457387

Look at the Harlequins! is a fictional autobiographical novel written by Vladimir Nabokov, first published in 1974. The work was Nabokov's final published novel before his death in 1977.

== Plot summary ==
Look at the Harlequins! is a fictional autobiography narrated by Vadim Vadimovich N. (VV), a Russian-American writer with uncanny biographical likenesses to the novel's author, Vladimir (Vladimirovich) Nabokov. VV is born in pre-revolutionary St. Petersburg and raised by his aunt, who advises him to "look at the harlequins" "Play! Invent the world! Invent reality!". After the revolution, VV moves to Western Europe. Count Nikifor Nikodimovich Starov becomes his patron (is he VV's father?). VV meets Iris Black who becomes his first wife. After her death—she is killed by a Russian émigré—he marries Annette (Anna Ivanovna Blagovo), his long-necked typist. They have a daughter, Isabel, and emigrate to the United States. The marriage fails; and, after Annette's death, VV takes care of the pubescent Isabel, now known as Bel. They travel from motel to motel. To counter ugly rumors, VV marries Louise Adamson while Bel elopes with an American to Soviet Russia. After the third marriage fails, VV marries again, a Bel lookalike (same birthdate, too), referred to as "you", his final love.

VV is an unreliable narrator who gives conflicting information (e.g., on the death of his father) and seems to suffer from some psychological affliction. When making a full turn while walking—mentally, that is—and tracing his steps back, he is unable to execute the reversion of the surrounding vista in his imagination. He also has the notion that he is a double of another Nabokovian persona.

== Reception ==
=== Doppelgänger vs. parody ===
Literary criticism has weighed in on both sides of this debate, some even claiming that Vadim is both a parody and a double or Doppelgänger of Nabokov. For example, Nabokov's Lolita is acted out by the narrator of Look at the Harlequins! through his fondling of the nymphet, Dolly von Borg. The attribution of a string of wives to the narrator may be understood in the context of Nabokov's strictly monogamous life. After the publication of Lolita the wider public and many critics thought that its author must be a "sexual daredevil". With the serial polygamy related in Look at the Harlequins!, Nabokov can be seen to be poking fun at these perceptions. V.V.'s final wife is simply addressed as "You", which parallels Nabokov's addressing his wife, Véra, simply as "you" in his autobiography Speak, Memory. The fact that the final object of V.V.'s love is a perfect image of V.V.'s daughter, "Bel," parallels the search by Humbert Humbert, the main character of Lolita, for a girl-child just like "Annabel", his first love when he himself was aged 12.

If V.V. is afflicted by feelings of being the double of another Nabokovian persona, this is because he bears in fact significant resemblances to the main character of the novel The Real Life of Sebastian Knight from 1941.

=== Biographical reading of the novel ===
The composition of Look at the Harlequins! followed on the heels of Andrew Field’s biography Nabokov: His Life in Part, a biography that eventually resulted in the termination of Nabokov’s relations with Field and in the novelist’s failed attempt at legal suppression of the biography. Nabokov felt that Field had created a character named Vladimir Nabokov in his biography—a character whom the real author could not recognize (Johnson, 330). Nabokov “had already perfected the role of his own biographer—in a series of mock biographies that began with a game he invented in adolescence, and that continued in his memoir Speak, Memory (1966) and his fiction. The encounter with Field, his first real-life biographer, produced ... [the] parodic text ... Look at the Harlequins! (1974) ...” (Sweeney 295–6).

The book begins with a list of "Other Books by the Narrator" (that is, Vadim rather than Vladimir Nabokov). Many (if not all) of these titles appear to be doppelgangers of Nabokov's real novels.

- Tamara (1925) relates to Mary
- Pawn Takes Queen (1927) relates to King, Queen, Knave combined with The Defense
- Plenilune (1929) relates to The Defense
- Camera Lucida (Slaughter in the Sun) relates to Laughter in the Dark (Russian title, "Camera Obscura")
- The Red Top Hat (1934) relates to Invitation to a Beheading
- The Dare (1950) relates to The Gift ("Dar", in Russian) and Glory. There is also mention of the protagonist in this novel writing a book similar to Despair
- See under Real (1939) relates to The Real Life of Sebastian Knight, combined with Pale Fire
- Esmeralda and Her Parandrus (1941)
- Dr. Olga Repnin (1946) relates to Pnin
- Exile from Mayda (1947), a collection of short stories, relates to Pale Fire and/or Spring in Fialta and Other Stories
- A Kingdom by the Sea (1962) relates to Lolita
- Ardis (1970) relates to Ada or Ardor

Look at the Harlequins! was heavily influenced by Nabokov's reading of Martin Gardner's book The Ambidextrous Universe.

== Bibliography ==
- Johnson, D. Barton. “The Ambidextrous Universe of Nabokov’s Look At the Harlequins!” Critical Essays on Vladimir Nabokov. Ed. Phyllis A. Roth. Boston: G. K. Hall, 1984. 202–215.
- Sweeney, Susan Elizabeth. “Playing Nabokov: Performances By Himself and Others.” Studies in 20th Century Literature 22:2 (1977): 295–318.
- Grabes, Herbert. “The Deconstruction of Autobiography: Look at the Harlequins!” Cycnos 10:1 (1993): 151–158.
- Maddox, Lucy. Nabokov’s Novels in English. Athens, Georgia: University of Georgia Press, 1983.
- Tammi, Pekka. Problems of Nabokov’s Poetics: A Narratological Analysis. Helsinki: Academia Scientiarum Fennica, 1985.
