= Mary (Nabokov novel) =

1926 novel by Vladimir Nabokov

- First edition (Russian)
- Author: Vladimir Nabokov
- Original title: Машенька (Mashen'ka)
- Translator: Vladimir Nabokov and Michael Glenny
- Language: Russian
- Publisher: Slovo; McGraw Hill (English)
- Publication date: 1926
- Publication place: Germany
- English publication date: 1970

Mary (Russian: Машенька, Mašen'ka) is the first novel by Vladimir Nabokov, first published under the pen name V. Sirin in 1926 by Russian-language publisher "Slovo".

== Plot summary ==
Mary is the story of Lev Glebovich Ganin, a Russian émigré and former White Guard Officer displaced by the Russian Revolution. Ganin is now living in a boarding house in Berlin, along with a young Russian girl, Klara, an old Russian poet, Podtyagin, his landlady, Lydia Nikolaevna Dorn and his neighbour, Aleksey Ivanovich Alfyorov, whom he meets in a dark, broken-down elevator at the beginning of the novel. Through a series of conversations with Alfyorov and a photograph, Ganin discovers that his long-lost first love, Mary, is now the wife of his rather unappealing neighbour, and that she will be joining him soon. As Ganin realizes this, he ends his relationship with his current girlfriend, Lyudmila, and begins to be consumed by his memories of his time in Russia with Mary, which Ganin notes were "perhaps the happiest days of his life". Enthralled by his vision of Mary and unable to let Alfyorov have her, Ganin contrives to reunite with Mary, who he believes still loves him.

Eventually, Ganin claims that he will leave Berlin the night before Mary is to arrive and his fellow residents throw a party for him the night before. Ganin steadily plies Alfyorov with alcohol, heavily intoxicating him. Just before Alfyorov falls into his drunken sleep, he asks Ganin to set his alarm clock for half past seven, as Alfyorov intends to pick up Mary at the train station the next morning. The infatuated Ganin instead sets the clock for eleven and plans to meet Mary at the train station himself. However, as he leaves the house, he has a moment of clarity. "The world of memories in which Ganin had dwelt became what it was in reality: the distant past... Other than that image no Mary existed, nor could exist." Instead of meeting Mary, Ganin decides to board a train to France.

A secondary, minor plot concerns an old Russian poet, Anton Sergeyevich Podtyagin, who appears to be an older version of Ganin. He frequently expresses that his life dedicated to poetry has been a waste. Podtyagin desires to eventually leave Berlin and arrive in Paris, but fails to do so on several occasions due to a series of unfortunate events (i.e. loses passport).

== Characters in Mary ==
Lev Glebovich Ganin – The protagonist of the novel; a young displaced Russian writer in Berlin who is unable to forget Mary, his first love.

Aleksey Ivanovich Alfyorov – The husband of Mary and the neighbour of Ganin.

Lydia Nikolaevna Dorn – The landlady of Ganin. An old Russian woman who inherited the boarding house after her German husband died.

Lyudmila Borisovna Rubanski – Ganin's girlfriend in the opening chapters of the novel.

Klara – A young Russian girl living in the same building as Ganin. She harbors an intense attraction to him.

Anton Sergeyevich Podtyagin – An old Russian poet who desires to leave Berlin for Paris, but fails to do so. Reappears briefly in The Gift.

Mary Alfyorov – The eponymous character and Ganin's first love. Mary never appears in the present of the novel, but only in Ganin's memories.

Kolin and Gornotsvetov – Ballet dancers, also living at Lydia's boarding house.

Erika – Maid (her name is mentioned in chapter 2, clearing way the plates, and in chapter 7, delivering a letter to Ganin).

Russian doctor – Unnamed physician called on to see Podtyagin (chapter 16).

== Background ==
Mary was first written and published in the mid-1920s during Nabokov's stay in Berlin. Nabokov's (or "Sirin's", as he was known at the time) first novel contains, as many of his works do, key autobiographical elements. According to Brian Boyd, the character Mary Alfyorov is based on Nabokov's first love, Valentina (Lyussya) Evgenievna Shulgin, a fifteen-year-old Russian girl he met in 1915 at a pavilion in the estate of Vyra, at the age of sixteen. Nabokov's time with Lyussya is recorded in the final chapter of his autobiography, Speak, Memory where she is given the pseudonym "Tamara". Nabokov confirms this connection himself in the foreword to the English edition, where he writes that "Mary is a twin sister of my Tamara". Like Ganin, Nabokov was separated from Tamara by the Russian Revolution and forced into Berlin as an émigré.

== Reception ==
The novel was initially well-received in the 1920s for its inventive structure and vivid descriptions of pre-Revolutionary Russia. Among contemporary critics however, it is generally viewed as an early, relatively juvenile work of Nabokov, written at a time before he came into his own as an author. Nabokov himself seemed to share the same opinion, at least on a technical level, as he notes its "flaws, the artifacts of innocence and inexperience". Furthermore, Nabokov's decision to translate and publish Mary in English last out of all his Russian novels perhaps is an indication of his opinion on its quality (the Russian works which he held in most esteem, such as Invitation to a Beheading and The Defense, were translated and published into English decades earlier). Yet the author seemed to also have a softer side for his first novel, "confessing to the sentimental stab of [his] attachment" to it.

Martin Amis, on the other hand, when appraising Nabokov's oeuvre, claimed Mary was one of his best works, calling it a "little beauty."

=== Analysis ===
In Mary, Nabokov explores many of the metaphysical ideas of French philosopher Henri Bergson and investigates the nature of the relationships between time, memory and consciousness, as noticed by scholars like Boyd and Eric Laursen.

Furthermore, the issue of solipsism, which, according to Alfred Appel, is "a central concern" in Nabokov's oeuvre, is prominently featured in Mary, as Ganin struggles with the self-created image of his first love. As Leona Toker remarks, "the romance which started solipsistically in the imagination [ends], no less solipsistically".

== Film adaptation ==
A film adaptation, titled Maschenka after the original Russian title, was released in 1987. The film, directed by John Goldschmidt with screenplay by John Mortimer, starred Cary Elwes as Ganin and Irina Brook as Maschenka. John Goldschmidt won the Cine De Luca Award for directing 'Maschenka" at the Monte Carlo TV Festival.

== Publication history ==
- 1970, USA, McGraw-Hill
- 1989, USA, Vintage International ISBN 0-679-72620-9, Pub Date November 1989

=== English translation and authorial changes ===
The novel first appeared in English in 1970 in a translation by Michael Glenny "in collaboration with the author." According to Nabokov, "I realized as soon as [we] started that our translation should be as faithful to the text as I would have insisted on its being had that text not been mine." He further stated that "The only adjustments I deemed necessary are limited to brief utilitarian phrases in three or four pages alluding to routine Russian matters ...[and] the switch of seasonal dates in Ganin's Julian Calendar to those of the Gregorian style in general use."
