= The Waltz Invention =

1938 tragicomedy by Vladimir Nabokov

- First English edition
- Author: Vladimir Nabokov
- Original title: Izobretenie Val'sa
- Translator: Dmitri Nabokov
- Language: Russian
- Genre: Play
- Publisher: Phaedra Inc.
- Publication date: 1938
- English publication date: 1966
- Pages: 111

The Waltz Invention is a tragicomedy in three acts written by Vladimir Nabokov in Russian as Izobretenie Val'sa in 1938. It was first published in Russkie Zapiski in Paris in the same year. Nabokov translated it at that time into English for the first time. The second English translation was made by Dmitri Nabokov in 1964 with the help of his father who also made some alterations; it was published in 1966. The play takes place in an unnamed country in about 1935. Nabokov makes the point in the 1965 written foreword that while the work sounds a "prophetic forenote" - the invention is a weapon of mass destruction - he has no political message and does not support the peaceniks of his time.

== Plot ==
Act 1: In the office of the Minister of War: The minister of war receives Salvator Waltz - "a haggard inventor, a fellow author" - who declares that he controls a new machine of immense destructive power called Telemort or Telethanasia that can blow up cities, mountains, even countries. The minister dismisses him as a nut. Shortly thereafter a mountain in the vista of his windows blows up exactly at the time predicted by Waltz. He is called back and explains to the dubious minister that this was indeed the planned experiment to showcase his weapon; the minister and his advisor are not yet convinced and do not know what to do. Trance (in Russian her name is son, meaning dream), a journalist who becomes Waltz's assistant suggests to appoint a committee. Annabella appears and indicates that on the mountain lived once an old enchanter and a snow-white gazelle.

Act 2: In the Council Hall of the Ministry: A committee of bumbling old generals is in session to decide what to do after more experimental explosions have made it clear that the power of the weapon is enormous. Trance suggests to buy it. Waltz is called and offered money but refuses to sell it. He declares that he has the weapon to create a new world order, war and military and politics become superfluous. Waltz shows his side as a poet when he extols the New Life where he will be the "keeper of the garden key". Annabella, the daughter of a general, objects to the "bad dreams" Waltz has, but Waltz prevails and is welcomed as the new ruler.

Act 3: In the office of the Minister of War: Waltz is in charge but bored by the day-to-day drudgery of governing. There was an assassination attempt on him presumably by a foreign agent, and in response he blows up the city of Santa Morgana. He plans to move to the island of Palmera and from time to time check on the affairs of government which should be easy as no country will be able to resist him. He demands luxury and servitude. His dream is becoming a nightmare. A parade of women is shown to him to please him, one of them citing a poem he had written a long time ago, but he wants Annabella. He summons her father who, however, refuses to submit; he will not deliver his daughter to Waltz. Waltz threatens to blow up everything, but Trance now makes it clear: there is no Telemort machine. It all was the imagination of Waltz. Reality now sets in, the real interview of Waltz takes place. The minister rejects him in less than a minute, opens the window, the mountain is still there, and Waltz is taken to the madhouse.

== Production ==
The first production had been planned for 1939 by a Russian émigré company but World War II intervened. The first Russian production was performed by the Oxford University Russian Club in 1968, and the English version was first produced by the Hartford Stage Company, Hartford, Connecticut, in 1969.

== Comments ==
In the foreword Nabokov indicates that "if ... the action of the play is absurd, it is because this is the way mad Waltz - before the play starts - imagines it is going to be...". In contrast to the "black pit of reality", Nabokov wants the scenery colorful and rich and the uniforms of the generals "must glow like Christmas trees". The generals names were Berg, Breg, Brig, Brug, Gerb, Grab, Grib, Gorb, Grob, and Grub originally, and are changed to Bump, Dump, Gump, Hump, Lump, Mump, Rump, Stump, Tump, Ump, and Zump in the final English translation. Three of the generals are dummies.

== Reception and critique ==
The play has received a mixed response. At the time of the 1966 publication, Time criticized Nabokov's play as a "cloud-capped tower of fantasy (that falls) to a dusty heap of speculation". It noted its "savage humor" and described it as a "prophetic, satyrical play". Morris indicated that the play "with its grotesque combination of lyrical poetry, subdued emotional pain and manic, farcical activity, approximates the absurdist dimensions of an Ionesco or Beckett". The Time review from 1969 performance sees the play as a parable of the writer who tears things down and rebuilds new worlds. Nabokov himself sees Waltz as a tragic figure.

== Quote from the foreword ==
"It is hard, I submit, to loathe bloodshed, including war, more than I do, but it is still harder to exceed my loathing of the very nature of totalitarian states in which massacre is only an administrative detail." (VN, 1965)
