= The Original of Laura =

1977 incomplete novel by Vladimir Nabokov

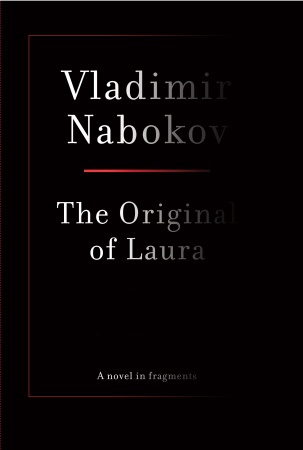
- First edition cover (faded text intentional)
- Author: Vladimir Nabokov
- Cover artist: Chip Kidd
- Language: English
- Publisher: Penguin Modern Classics (UK); Knopf (US)
- Publication date: November 17, 2009

The Original of Laura is an incomplete novel by Vladimir Nabokov, which he was writing at the time of his death in 1977. It was published by Nabokov's son Dmitri Nabokov in 2009, despite the author's request that the work be destroyed upon his death.

Commenters lambasted the quality of the writing and admonished Nabokov's executor for publishing the work in that state.

== Plot ==
Based on discussions with unidentified scholars, The Times summarizes the plot as follows:

Philip Wild, an enormously corpulent scholar, is married to a slender, flighty and wildly promiscuous woman called Flora. Flora initially appealed to Wild because of another woman that he’d been in love with, Aurora Lee. Death and what lies beyond it, a theme which fascinated Nabokov from a very young age, are central. The book opens at a party and there follow four continuous scenes, after which the novel becomes more fragmented. It is not clear how old Wild is, but he is preoccupied with his own death and sets about obliterating himself from the toes upwards through meditation, a sort of deliberate self-inflicted self-erasure.

== Background ==
According to his diaries, Nabokov first noted his work on the project on December 1, 1974, under the title Dying Is Fun. By the summer of 1976, he noted that the story was completed in his mind, but by then his health was failing rapidly.

When Nabokov died on July 2, 1977, he was still working on the novel, since retitled The Opposite of Laura and finally The Original of Laura. The incomplete manuscript consists of Nabokov's own handwriting across 138 index cards, the equivalent of about 30 manuscript pages. The use of index cards was normal for Nabokov, the basis of many of his works, such as Lolita and Pale Fire.

== Executor's dilemma ==
Nabokov was a perfectionist and made it clear that, upon his death, any unfinished work was to be destroyed. Nabokov's wife, Véra, and their son, Dmitri, became his literary executors, but ultimately ignored his will, and did not destroy the manuscript. Dmitri noted that Véra Nabokov "failed to carry out this task, her procrastination due, 'to age, weakness and immeasurable love.'" They placed it in a Swiss bank vault, where it remained until its eventual publication. In 1991 Véra died, leaving Dmitri Nabokov as the sole literary executor. Dmitri wavered on whether to destroy the manuscript. On the one hand, he felt bound to uphold his "filial duty" and grant his father's request, but he also said the novel "would have been a brilliant, original, and potentially totally radical book, in the literary sense very different from the rest of his oeuvre." Dmitri noted "his father, ... or his 'father’s shade,' would not 'have opposed the release of ‘Laura’ once ‘Laura’ had survived the hum of time this long.'"

Scholars and enthusiasts disagreed over whether the manuscript should be made public; as the (London) Times posed the question: "the demands of the literary world versus the posthumous rights of an author over his art." The younger Nabokov remarked cryptically that one other person possessed a key to the manuscript, but did not say who that person was. Like Nabokov, many observers were on the fence about the disposition of the manuscript. The author Edmund White compared the author's last request to Virgil's request to destroy the Aeneid (ignored by Augustus Caesar) or Franz Kafka's request to destroy his papers (ignored by Max Brod). Nabokov weighed in on Nikolai Gogol's decision to burn the sequels to Dead Souls.

The journalist Ron Rosenbaum, who corresponded with Dmitri Nabokov, said that the son had been inclined toward destroying the manuscript, swayed by criticism of his father, such as allegations of plagiarism that arose from the discovery of a 1916 German short story, "Lolita" with some similarities to Nabokov's work, or critics who had interpreted Nabokov's work as suggesting that Nabokov was sexually abused.

In April 2008 Dmitri Nabokov told many publications, including Nabokov Online Journal and Der Spiegel, that he intended to publish the manuscript after all. In the Nabokov Online Journal interview with Suellen Stringer-Hye, Nabokov stated that he had never seriously considered burning the manuscript. Once Dmitri decided to publish the manuscript, "several short excerpts were published in advance in the Sunday Times Magazine, as well as Playboy, to which Nabokov was a contributor."

BBC Newsnight predicted that the novel's publication was "likely to be the literary event of 2009."

== Publication of excerpts ==
In the late 1990s Dmitri Nabokov read a portion of the book to a group of about 20 scholars at a centenary celebration of his father at Cornell University. The scholars Brian Boyd and Lara Delage-Toriel claim to have read the manuscript. In 1999 two passages from The Original of Laura were published in The Nabokovian, a scholarly publication devoted to Nabokov. Zoran Kuzmanovich, a scholar of Nabokov, said of passages he heard at Cornell University, "It sounds as though the story is about aging but holding onto the original love of one's life."

The German weekly Die Zeit in its 14 August 2008 issue reproduced some of Nabokov's original index cards which had been obtained by journalist Malte Herwig. In the accompanying article, Herwig concluded that "Laura", although fragmentary, was "vintage Nabokov".

According to a 2006 account of the book by Lara Delage-Toriel, the narrator and protagonist of Nabokov's book receives a novel titled My Laura from a painter. The narrator realizes that the novel is in fact about his own wife Flora, whom the painter had once pursued. In this novel within the novel, Laura is "destroyed" by the narrator (the "I" of the book). Delage-Toriel also notes that the names of Laura and Flora, possibly refer to well-known High Renaissance portraits of women by Titian and Giorgione, both evoking the Italian sonneteer Petrarch's unconsummated obsession with a woman named Laura.

According to Delage-Toriel, the meaning of "the Original" is unclear:

Does it refer to the mistress of the “I,” the Laura of My Laura, or to the probable mistress of this novel’s author, the Flora of The Original of Laura? The manuscript’s playful juxtapositions obviously incite the reader to fuse both ‘originals’ into a single original, a gesture which Nabokov graphically performs in ‘chapter’ 5, by contriving an amusing hybrid, ‘Flaura’. On close observation of the manuscript, one notices that the name contains in fact two capital letters, ‘F’ and ‘L’, as though Nabokov had been loath to give precedence to either name and had instead opted for some typographical monster, a bicephalous cipher of sorts.

The Original of Laura was the subject of a 1998 literary prank which capitalized on its cachet as a mysterious "lost work" of a renowned author. Jeff Edmunds, a Pennsylvania State University employee and editor of the Nabokov website Zembla, posted an essay on his site entitled "The Original of Laura: A First Look at Nabokov's Last Novel". The essay, supposedly written by a Swiss scholar named Michel Desommelier, included concocted passages from Laura that fooled scholars and even Dmitri Nabokov. Edmunds then worked with Nabokov's Russian translator, Sergei Il'in, to publish the fake passages in Russian literary journals.

== Content ==
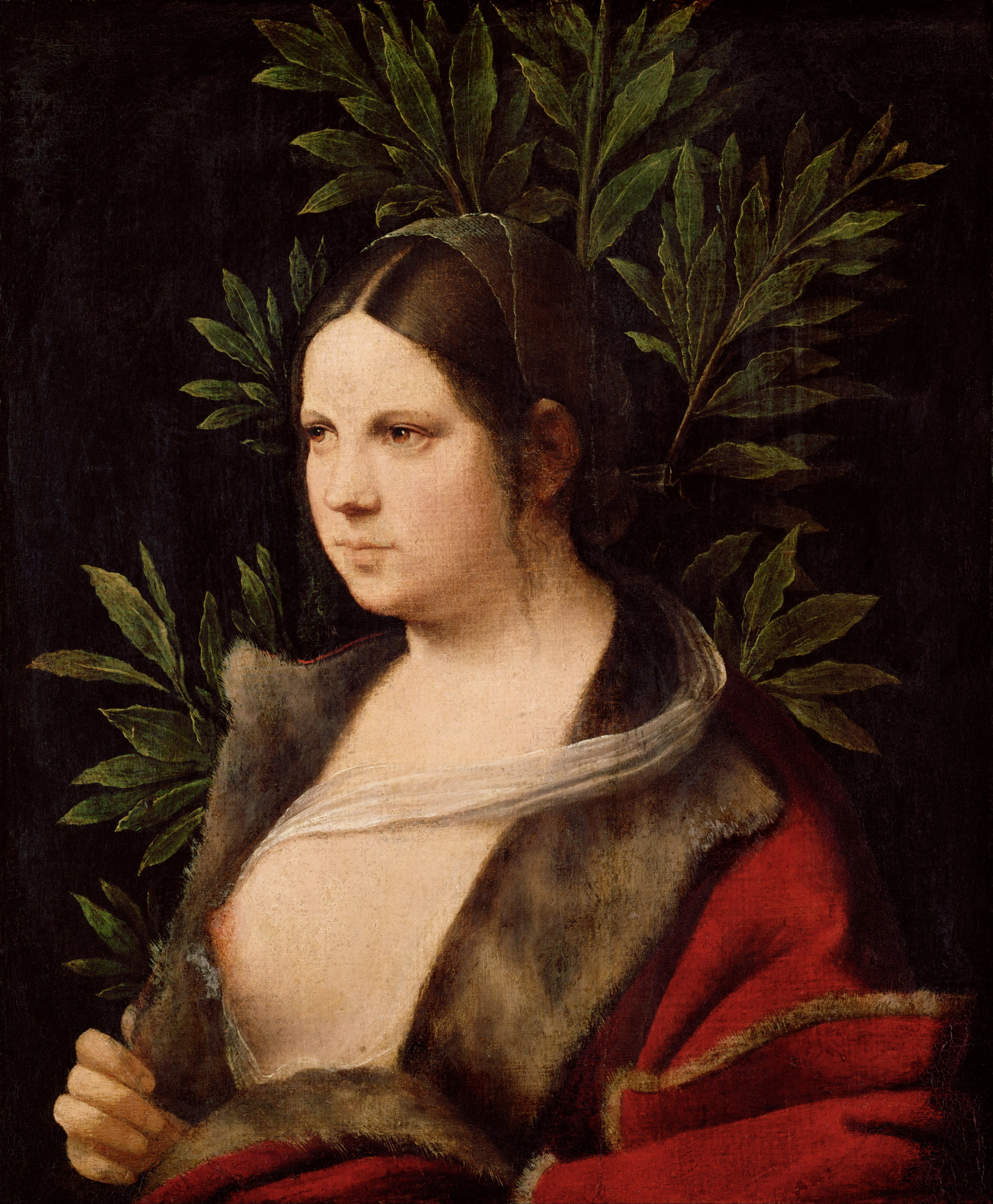
Laura, painted 1506 by Giorgione

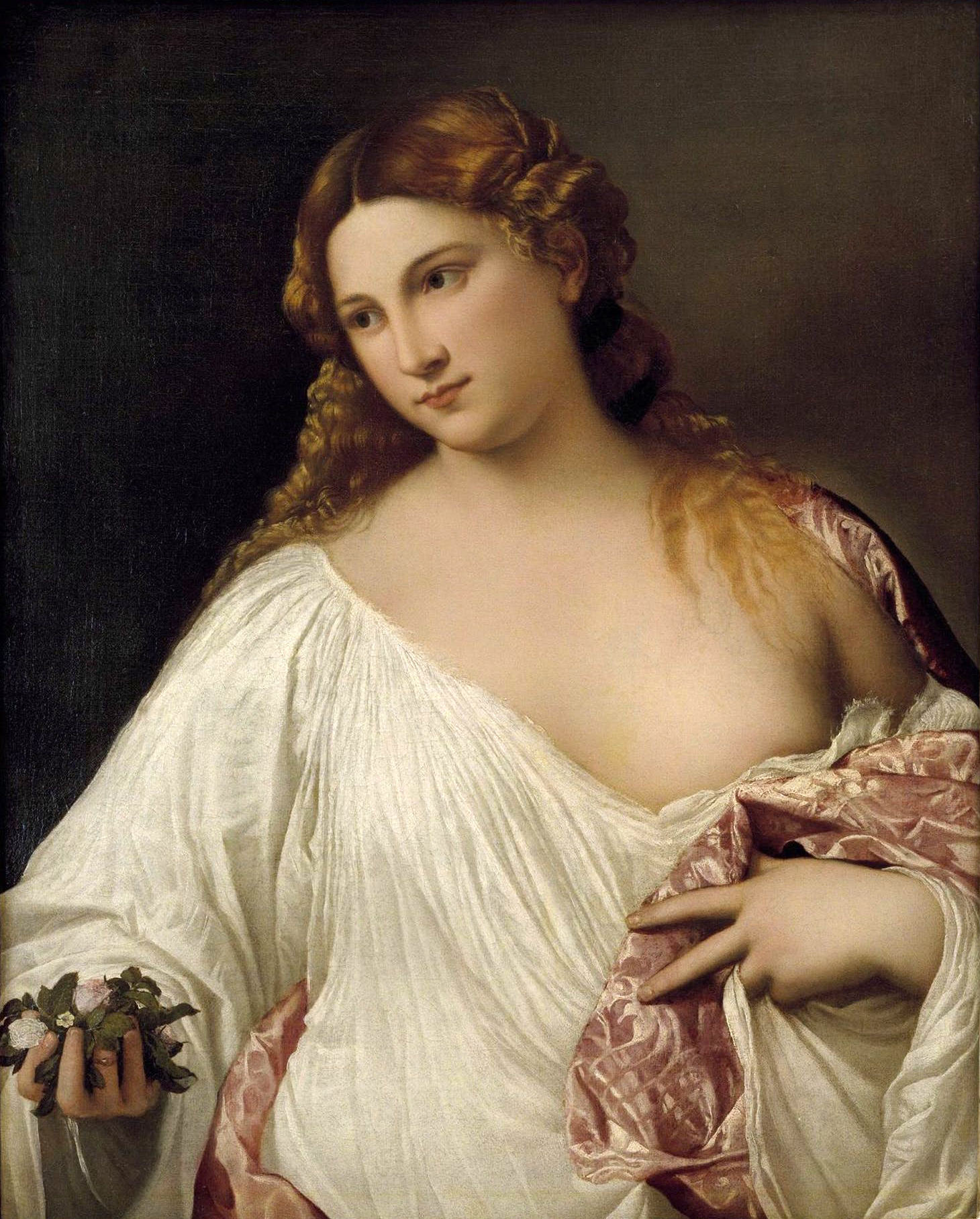
Flora, painted 1515 by Titian

John Banville called the published volume, designed by Chip Kidd, "a triumph of the book maker's art". The pages are gray and heavy. Each one comprises a reproduction of an index card above and a printed version of the card below. The photographs of the cards are perforated so the reader can take them out and rearrange them. Banville considered the perforations "dubious", and a review in the Washington Times called it "little more than gimmick" that "would surely have disgusted the author", but a review in The Cornell Daily Sun called the format "ingenious".

The book also includes an introduction by Dmitri Nabokov about the writing of the book and his decision to publish it.

== Literary significance and reception ==
A review of the German translation in the Frankfurter Allgemeine Zeitung compared the fragment to a "labyrinthine, overgrown garden without a gazebo in its center" and "a puzzle with too many missing pieces". Alexander Theroux's review of the book in The Wall Street Journal criticized the publication as an exemplar of a writer who has lost his literary powers except for a few hints and "witty Nabokovian moments", comparing the Nabokov of Laura to Lou Gehrig in 1939. Martin Amis echoed this sentiment somewhat more directly in his review in The Guardian, "When a writer starts to come off the rails, you expect skidmarks and broken glass; with Nabokov, naturally, the eruption is on the scale of a nuclear accident." Theroux concluded, "The last card of The Original of Laura is a poignant list of synonyms for 'efface'—expunge, erase, delete, rub out, wipe out, obliterate ... it is a pity that his instructions were ignored and the novel survived in such a form. English professors may assign The Original of Laura to their students someday, but it is really better suited to a college ethics class." He was not the only reviewer to suggest that the fragments should not have been published or should not be read.

However, a reviewer in New York Magazine was glad to have the book; he enjoyed reading it and enjoyed the opportunity to see Nabokov's work "rough". A reviewer in the Christian Science Monitor said the book was "filled with sly wit and memorable images" and considered the publication of it "a generous gift to readers". Writing for Literary Review, David Lodge asks, "Is it, as the blurb claims, Nabokov's 'final great book'? No. Does it contain brilliant, funny, astonishing sentences only Nabokov could have written? Yes. Should it have been preserved and published? Definitely."

Few reviewers commented on the introduction, but at least two criticized it harshly. One scholar, David Vernon, writing in his 2022 book, Aza to Zembla: The Novels of Vladimir Nabokov, sees the text as the crucial, if unrealised, third part of a final Nabokovian trilogy (with Transparent Things and Look at the Harlequins!).

== See also ==
- List of works published posthumously
