= Pnin (novel) =

1957 novel by Vladimir Nabokov

- First edition in book form
- Author: Vladimir Nabokov
- Language: English
- Publisher: Heinemann
- Publication date: 7 March 1957
- Publication place: United States

Pnin (Russian: Пнин, pronounced [pnʲin]) is Vladimir Nabokov's 13th novel and his fourth written in English; it was published in 1957. The success of Pnin in the United States helped establish Nabokov's literary reputation there. The novel's title character, Timofey Pavlovich Pnin, is a Russian-born assistant professor in his fifties who lives in the United States. The character is believed to have been based partly on Nabokov's colleague Marc Szeftel and partly on Nabokov himself. Displaced by the Russian Revolution and what he calls the "Hitler war", Pnin teaches Russian at the fictional Waindell College, loosely based on two institutions where Nabokov taught: Cornell University and Wellesley College.

== Plot summary ==
=== Chapter 1 ===
Timofey Pavlovich Pnin, the title character, is a professor of Russian at Waindell College; "ideally bald" with a "strong man torso," "spindly legs," and "feminine feet". Pnin is on a train from Waindell to Cremona, where he is to give a guest lecture. He is persistently bothered by the fear that he may lose his lecture papers, or mix them up with the student essay he is correcting. He discovers he has boarded the wrong train and gets off. When he tries to board a bus to Cremona, he suddenly realizes he has lost his luggage (with his papers) and has a seizure. He finally arrives at Cremona by truck, having recovered his papers, and is about to give his lecture when he experiences a vision, seeing his dead parents and friends from before the Russian Revolution in the audience.

=== Chapter 2 ===
Laurence Clements, a fellow Waindell faculty member, and his wife Joan, are looking for a new lodger after their daughter Isabel has married and moved out. Pnin is the new tenant, informed of the vacancy by Waindell's librarian, Mrs. Thayer. The Clementses grow to enjoy Pnin's eccentricities and his idiosyncratic phrasings. There follows the history of Pnin's relationship with his ex-wife Dr. Liza Wind, who manipulated him into bringing her to America so that she could leave him for fellow psychologist Eric Wind. Liza visits Pnin, but only wants to extract money from him for her son, Victor. Although Pnin is aware of her nature, he obliges out of love for her. After she leaves, Pnin weeps at her cruelty, shouting "I haf nofing left, nofing, nofing!"

=== Chapter 3 ===
Pnin is alone at the Clementses' as they have gone to visit Isabel. The narrator describes Pnin's past lodgings and his idiosyncratic English. Pnin lectures his Elementary Russian class, then goes to the library, where he ignores Mrs. Thayer's attempts at small talk as he tries to return a book requested by another patron, but the record shows the requester to be Pnin himself. Pnin does research for his book on Russian culture, then attends the showing of a Soviet propaganda film, which causes him to weep. The chapter ends with the return of Isabel, who has left her husband. Pnin will have to find new lodgings.

=== Chapter 4 ===
Fourteen-year-old Victor Wind dreams of a foreign king who refuses to abdicate and is exiled (foreshadowing Pale Fire). In his fantasy, this king, rather than Eric Wind, is his father. Victor is depicted as an intelligent, nonconformist boy with a great talent for drawing. His parents have him psychoanalyzed, and are incapable of understanding his artistic talent, much to the boy's chagrin. Victor has little respect for his teachers at St. Bart's except for Lake the art teacher, "a tremendously obese man with shaggy eyebrows and hairy hands". Victor is to meet with Pnin at Waindell bus station, and Pnin hurriedly buys him a soccer ball and the Jack London novel The Son of the Wolf. Victor is not interested in soccer, and Pnin takes the entire encounter as a failure, unaware that Victor holds him in great admiration.

=== Chapter 5 ===
Pnin drives to The Pines, the summer home of a friend, where the host and guests are Russian émigrés and their Americanized children. Among his friends, Pnin, normally out of place in English-speaking society, is at ease and displays his knowledge of Russian culture and ability at croquet. A mutual friend mentions Pnin's former sweetheart, the Jewish Mira Belochkin, who was murdered at Buchenwald, the Nazi concentration camp. Another refers to Vladimir Vladimirovich, an expert on butterflies, who is later revealed to be the narrator of Pnin.

=== Chapter 6 ===
Pnin invites the Clementses, Mrs. Thayer, several Waindell faculty members, and his former student Betty Bliss to a "house-heating party". Pnin is considering buying the house from his landlord, but is informed by Dr. Hagen, the chair of his department, that a new department of Russian is to be formed, headed by a man under whom Pnin categorically refuses to work. Pnin almost breaks a magnificent glass punch bowl, a gift from Victor and a symbol of his regard.

=== Chapter 7 ===
The identity of the narrator is revealed—a Russian-American academic and lepidopterist called Vladimir Vladimirovich. V.V. recounts his version of his meetings with Pnin, claiming that they first met when V.V. had an appointment with Pnin's father, Pavel, an ophthalmologist. V.V. had an affair with Pnin's ex-wife Liza just before Pnin's marriage, disparaged her mediocre "Akhmatovesque" poetry, and drove her to attempt suicide. V.V. patronises Pnin, and many of his claims conflict with events V.V. himself narrated earlier in the book. V.V., the new head of the Waindell Russian department, wrote to Pnin to urge him to stay, but Pnin leaves Waindell, taking a stray dog with him. The novel closes with Jack Cockerell, head of English at Waindell, beginning to tell V.V. the story of Pnin bringing the wrong lecture papers to Cremona, bringing the narrative full circle.

== Background ==
=== Publication history ===
Pnin was originally written as a series of sketches, and Nabokov originally began writing Chapter 2 in January 1954, around the same time Lolita was being finalized. Sections of Pnin were first published, in installments, in The New Yorker in order to generate income while Nabokov was scouring the United States for a publisher willing to publish Lolita. It was soon expanded, revised, and published in book form.

Nabokov's original version of Pnin, which he sent to Viking, consisted of ten chapters and ended with Pnin's untimely death from the heart problem he suffers at the beginning of the novel. However, editor Pascal Covici rejected the idea and Nabokov heavily revised the novel, then titling the work My Poor Pnin, before finally settling on the current title. According to Boyd, Pnin is Nabokov's response to Don Quixote, which he had read a year earlier. Nabokov lambasted Cervantes for his cruelty to Quixote, seeming to encourage the reader to be amused by the eponymous character's pain and humiliation. The title of the book, Boyd says, lends even more credence to this theory, as it sounds like and nearly spells "pain".

=== Influences ===
The novel draws from Nabokov's experience at American academic institutions, primarily Cornell, and it has been claimed that it is "teeming" with people and physical details from that university. The main character is based, in part, on Cornell Professor Marc Szeftel, who may have "somewhat resented the resemblance". The description of the Waindell campus, however, better fits Wellesley.

Nabokov himself was capable of Pninian mistakes; according to his former student Alfred Appel:

I entered the class to find Professor Nabokov several sentences into his lecture; not wanting to waste another minute, he was stooped over his notes, intently reading them to thirty stunned students, a shell-shocked platoon belonging to an even tardier don. Trying to be transparent as possible, I approached the lectern and touched Nabokov in the sleeve. He turned, and peered down at me over his eyeglasses, amazed. "Mr. Nabokov," I said very quietly, "you are in the wrong classroom." He readjusted his glasses on his nose, focused his gaze on the motionless . . . figures seated before him, and calmly announced, "You have just seen the 'Coming Attraction' for Literature 325. If you are interested, you may register next fall."

Galya Diment also notes another Pninian anecdote of Nabokov:

James McConkey, a writer and a professor of English Literature who inherited the European Novel course after Nabokov left Cornell, remembers seeing Nabokov, "his whole face flushed and red," running out of the classroom where he was lecturing and into the office of the (still existent at the time) Division of Literature. Nabokov appeared to be so agitated that McConkey actually worried that "he was going to have a stroke or something . . . He was stammering . . . I thought he might fall over." Apparently, this "Pninian-size rage" was occasioned by one of the students' pointed question as to whether, if Professor Nabokov refused to discuss Dostoyevsky, the student himself could.

In terms of literary influences, Pnin's flight from Waindell in his blue car recalls Chichikov's flight from town by wagon, at the end of the first part of Nikolai Gogol's Dead Souls.

== Reception ==
Contrary to popular belief, it was not Lolita that made Nabokov a well-known writer in the United States, but rather Pnin, which was published a year earlier (1957) in America. Although it did not become a mainstream novel as Lolita did, Pnin had a relatively wide readership in literary circles, garnering favourable reviews. Upon its second week of publication, Pnin had already begun its second printing, and Nabokov was referred to as "one of the subtlest, funniest and most moving writers in the United States today" by Newsweek magazine. This was completely unprecedented for Nabokov, whose first two English-language novels, The Real Life of Sebastian Knight (1940) and Bend Sinister (1947), were largely ignored by the American public. Pnin was also a particular favourite of the Southern writer Flannery O'Connor (who provides the blurb in the Vintage edition), who found the story of the humorous Russian professor "wonderful". Pnin was also a favorite of British writer Martin Amis, who ranked it fourth on his list of best Nabokov novels. Pnin's success culminated in a nomination for the 1958 National Book Award for Fiction, the first of seven such nominations for Nabokov.

=== Analysis ===
A detail mentioned toward the end of Chapter 5 concerns the fate of Pnin's first love, Mira Belochkin, a Jew murdered at Buchenwald concentration camp. (Nabokov's wife, Véra, was also Jewish). Many Nabokov scholars, such as Boyd, David Vernon, Elena Sommers and Leona Toker, have pointed out the recurring motif of the squirrel in Pnin which follows him throughout the book - and that the name Belochkin is derived from the Russian diminutive for "squirrel". William W. Rowe suggests that not only do the squirrels embody the "resurrections" of Pnin's former love, but that the spirit of Mira can be found apart from the squirrels in the form of a "mysterious observer" who acts through the squirrels to oversee and influence the events in Pnin's life. In a sense, via Belochkin and the recurring squirrel, Pnin constitutes a subtle addressal of the Holocaust, where many of Nabokov's acquaintances and his own brother Sergey were killed. Boyd interprets Mira as the "moral center of the novel" and argues that in the confused reports of her generosity and fortitude in her last days "she comes to represent humanity at its best and most vulnerable". Relevant to this is the American town of Cremona, where, the morally unreliable narrator of the story informs us, Pnin visited to speak to the women's club at the beginning of the story; Cremona is the name of an Italian city that housed a "displaced persons" center where some Jews who survived the Nazi murders stayed, sometimes for more than a year, after the defeat of the Nazis, before being legally allowed to emigrate. In a similar fashion to the fictional Mira, Sergey Nabokov, who was taken to Neuengamme, exhibited tremendous conduct. According to Ivan Nabokov, Sergey "was extraordinary. He gave away lots of packages he was getting, of clothes and food, to people who were really suffering."

Boyd noted Pnin's sharp contrast with Nabokov's most famous character, Humbert Humbert, from Lolita, which was written simultaneously with Pnin. Pnin is the anti-Humbert in every sense: where Humbert flatteringly depicts himself as tall, handsome and charming with perfect English, Pnin is relayed as stubby, rotund, odd-looking and with comically bad English. In their respective stories, Humbert seduces with secret monstrosity, while the seemingly vulgar Pnin is a saint in disguise. The contrast is highlighted in matrimony; Humbert manipulates and secretly loathes his wife Charlotte, contemplates killing her and ultimately breaks her heart and instigates her accidental demise. Pnin, inversely, is mistreated cruelly by his wife and ex-wife Liza Wind, for whom he bends over to do any favour out of selfless love. Lastly and most vividly, in their treatment of children: Humbert abducts and abuses his foster-child Dolores Haze, whom he belittles and plies with sweets, while Pnin by contrast is a caring and supportive figure to Liza's son Victor Wind, who is in a sense his foster son. Fittingly, Dolores despises and resents Humbert and betrays him at the first opportunity, while Victor admires Pnin more than he realises and treasures his friendship, symbolised by the magnificent aquamarine glass bowl Victor purchases for Pnin in Chapter 6.

Arthur Mizener noted that whereas social isolation is often depicted as a negative consequence of characters’ behavior in most of Nabokov's novels, Timofey Pnin, the Russian emigrant and protagonist of Pnin, seems to embrace it. Mizener claims that Pnin “carries on with easy confidence of success and a firm assurance of his own common sense” instead of wallowing in self-pity over his social isolation. In relation to his criticism towards the American society, Mizener indicates that Pnin's “innocent self-confidence” illustrates the story's “remarkable observation of American life”. As the narrator of the book mentions, "It was the world that was absent-minded and it was Pnin whose business it was to set it straight."

== Connection with other Nabokov works ==
Timofey Pnin makes a brief cameo appearance in Pale Fire, where he is said to head the Russian department of Wordsmith College, a fictional university similar to Pnin's Waindell College.
