= Vladimir Nabokov =

Russian and American novelist (1899–1977)

- Владимир Набоков
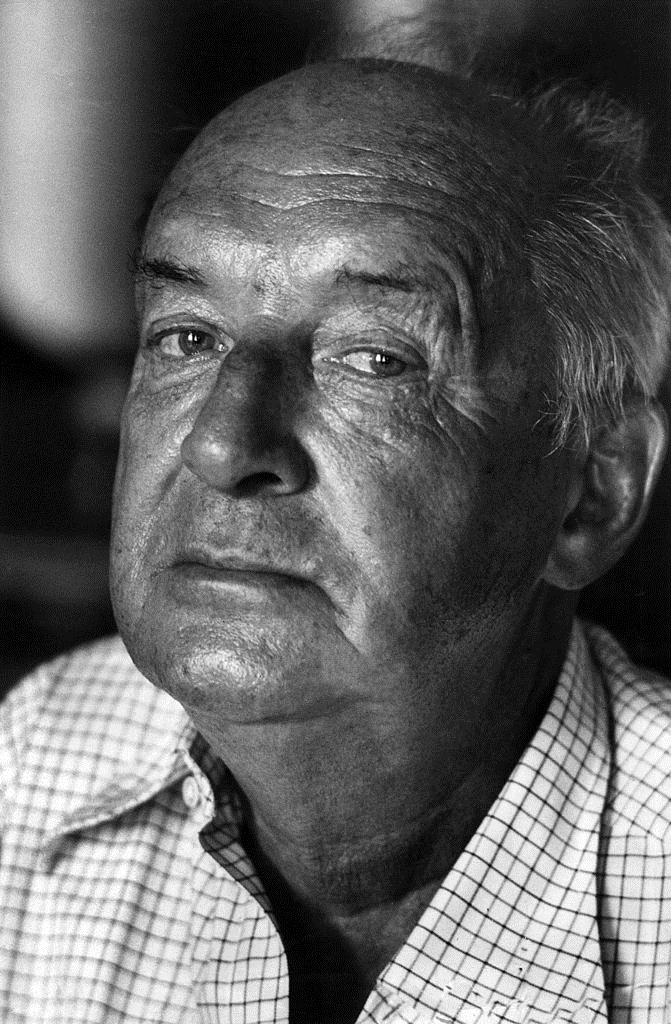
- Nabokov in 1973
- Born: 22 April 1899; Saint Petersburg, Russia
- Died: 2 July 1977 (aged 78); Montreux, Switzerland
- Citizenship: Russia (until 1922); United States
- Education: Trinity College, Cambridge (BA)
- Occupations: Novelist; poet; literary critic; entomologist; professor
- Employers: Wellesley College; Cornell University; Harvard University
- Spouse: Véra Nabokov (m. 1925)
- Children: Dmitri Nabokov
- Writing career
- Pen name: Vladimir Sirin
- Language: Russian; English; French
- Years active: from 1916
- Period: Contemporary (20th century)
- Genres: Novel; novella; short story; play; poetry; translation; autobiography; non-fiction
- Notable works: The Defense (1930); Despair (1934); Invitation to a Beheading (1936); The Gift (1938); The Enchanter (1939); "Signs and Symbols" (1948); Lolita (1955); Pnin (1957); Pale Fire (1962); Speak, Memory (1936–1966); Ada or Ardor (1969)
- Movements: Modernism; postmodernism
- Website: vladimir-nabokov.org

Vladimir Vladimirovich Nabokov (Note: British English: /ˈnæbəkɒf, nəˈboʊkɒf, -ˈbɒk-/ NAB-ə-kof, nə-BO(H)K-of, American English: /ˈnɑːbəkɔːf, ˈnæb-, nəˈbɔːkəf/ NA(H)B-ə-KAWF, nə-BAW-kəf.) (Russian: Влади́мир Влади́мирович Набо́ков [vlɐˈdʲimʲɪr vlɐˈdʲimʲɪrəvʲɪtɕ nɐˈbokəf]; 22 April [O.S. 10 April] 1899 (Note: Confusion over his birth date was generated by some people misunderstanding the relationship between the Julian and Gregorian calendars. At the time of Nabokov's birth, the offset between the calendars was 12 days. His date of birth in the Julian calendar was 10 April 1899; in the Gregorian, 22 April 1899. The fact that the offset increased from 12 to 13 days for dates occurring after February 1900 was always irrelevant to earlier dates, and hence a 13-day offset should never have been applied to Nabokov's date of birth. Nevertheless, it was so misapplied by some writers, and 23 April came to be erroneously shown in many places as his birthday. In his memoirs Speak, Memory Nabokov indicates that 22 April was the correct date but that he nevertheless preferred to celebrate his birthday "with diminishing pomp" on 23 April (p. 6). As he happily pointed out on several occasions during interviews, this meant he also shared a birthday with William Shakespeare and Shirley Temple.) – 2 July 1977), also known by the pen name Vladimir Sirin (Владимир Сирин), was a Russian and American novelist, poet, translator, and entomologist.

Born in Imperial Russia in 1899, Nabokov wrote his first nine novels in Russian (1926–1938) while living in Berlin, where he met his wife, Véra Nabokov (née Slonim). He achieved international acclaim and prominence after moving to the United States, where he began writing in English. Trilingual in Russian, English, and French, Nabokov became a U.S. citizen in 1945 and lived mostly on the East Coast before returning to Europe in 1961, where he settled in Montreux, Switzerland.

From 1948 to 1959, Nabokov was a professor of Russian literature at Cornell University. His 1955 novel Lolita ranked fourth on Modern Library's list of the 100 best 20th-century novels in 1998 and is considered one of the greatest works of 20th-century literature. Nabokov's Pale Fire, published in 1962, ranked 53rd on the same list. His memoir, Speak, Memory, published in 1951, is considered among the greatest nonfiction works of the 20th century, placing eighth on Random House's ranking of 20th-century works. Nabokov was a seven-time finalist for the National Book Award for Fiction. He also was an expert lepidopterist and composer of chess problems. Time magazine wrote that Nabokov had "evolved a vivid English style which combines Joycean word play with a Proustian evocation of mood and setting".

== Early life and education ==
=== Russia ===
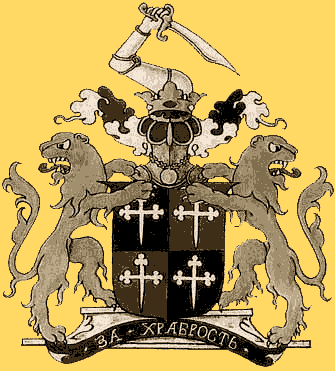
Coat of Arms of the Nabokov family, members of an ancient Russian nobility, granted to them on 1 January 1798 by Emperor Paul I

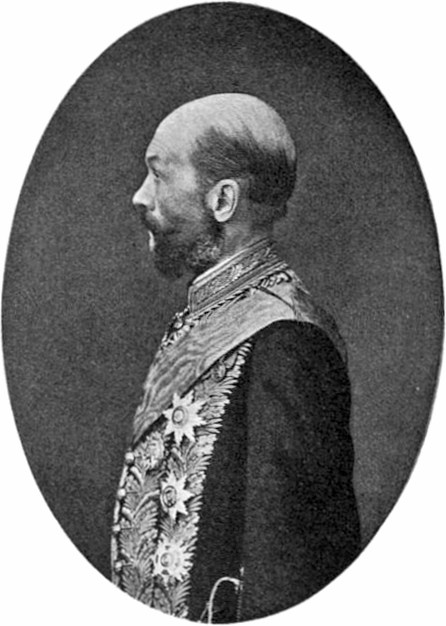
Nabokov's grandfather Dmitry Nabokov, who was Justice Minister under Tsar Alexander II

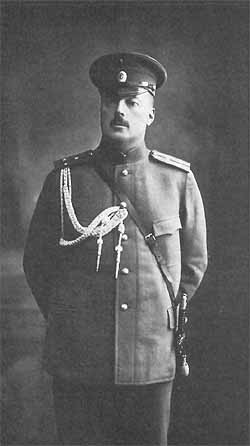
Nabokov's father, V. D. Nabokov, in his World War I officer's uniform, 1914

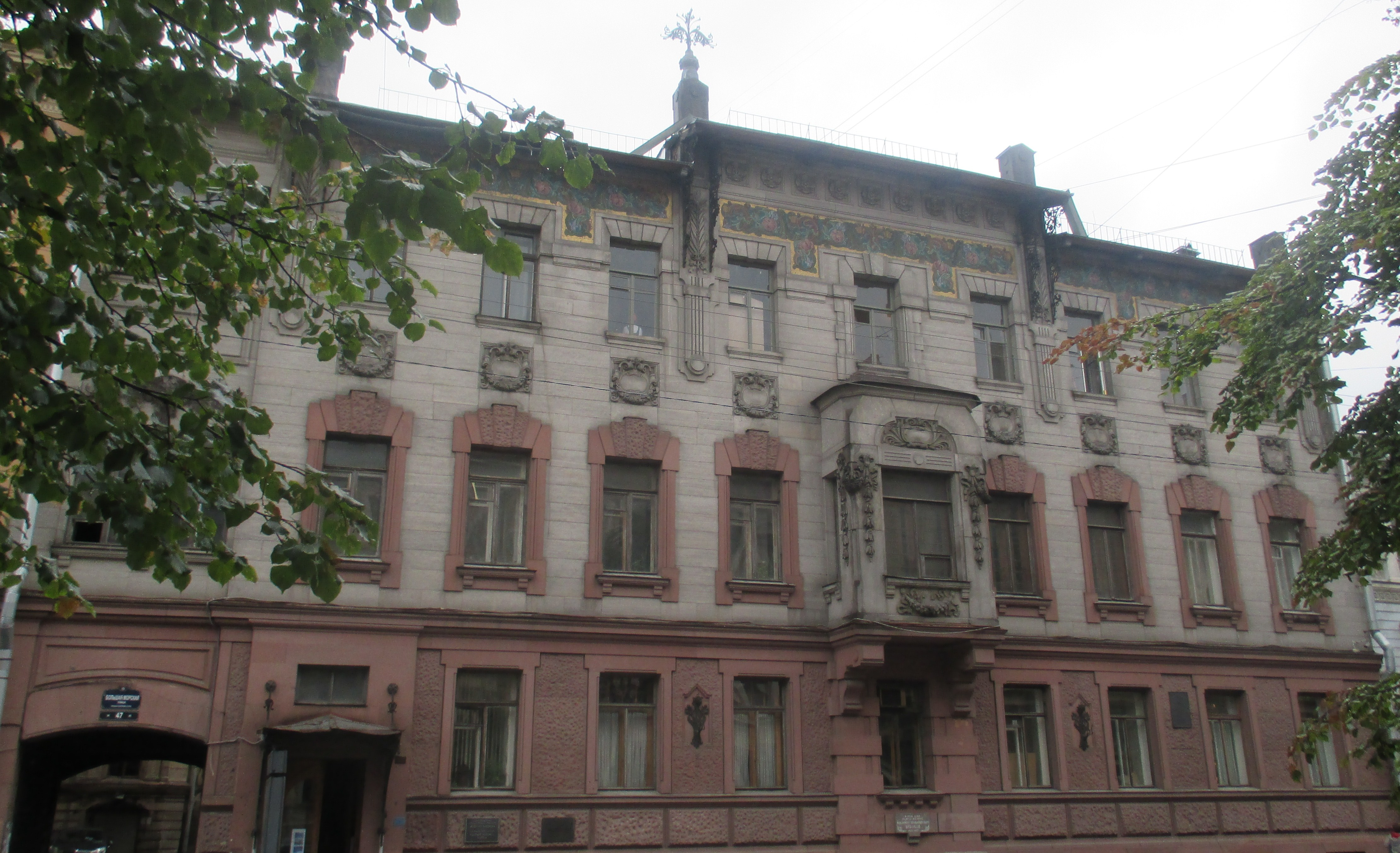
The Nabokov family mansion in Saint Petersburg; today it is the site of the Nabokov museum.

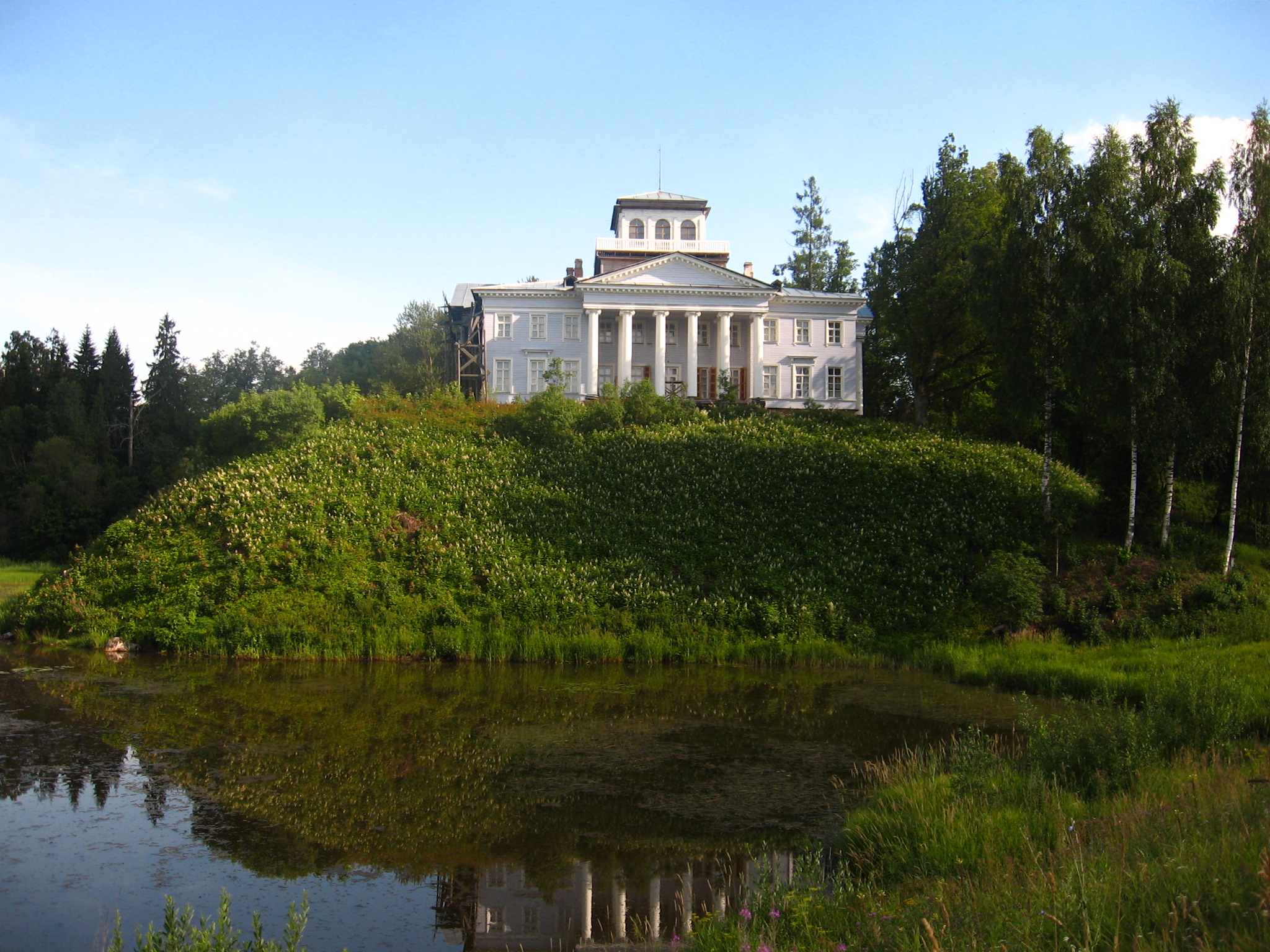
At age 16, Nabokov inherited the Rozhdestveno estate from his maternal uncle; Nabokov owned it for one year before losing it in the October Revolution.

Nabokov was born on 22 April [O.S. 10 April] 1899 in Saint Petersburg to a wealthy and prominent family of the Russian nobility. His family claimed descent from the 14th-century Tatar prince Nabok Murza, who entered into the service of the Tsars, and from whom the family name is derived. His father was Vladimir Dmitrievich Nabokov, a liberal lawyer, statesman, and journalist, and his mother was the heiress Yelena Ivanovna née Rukavishnikova, the granddaughter of a millionaire gold-mine owner. His father was a leader of the pre-Revolutionary liberal Constitutional Democratic Party, and wrote numerous books and articles about criminal law and politics. His cousins included the composer Nicolas Nabokov. His paternal grandfather, Dmitry Nabokov, was Russia's Justice Minister during the reign of Alexander II. His paternal grandmother was the Baltic German Baroness Maria von Korff. Through his father, he was a descendant of the composer Carl Heinrich Graun.

Vladimir was the family's eldest and favorite child. He had four younger siblings: Sergey, Olga, Elena, and Kirill. Sergey was killed in a Nazi concentration camp in 1945 after publicly denouncing Hitler's regime. Writer Ayn Rand recalled Olga (her close friend at Stoiunina Gymnasium) as a supporter of constitutional monarchy who first awakened Rand's interest in politics. Elena, who in later years became Vladimir's favorite sibling, published her correspondence with him in 1985. She was an important source for Nabokov's biographers.

Nabokov spent his childhood and youth in Saint Petersburg and at the country estate Vyra near Siverskaya, south of the city. His childhood, which he called "perfect" and "cosmopolitan", was remarkable in several ways. The family spoke Russian, English, and French in their household, and Nabokov was trilingual from an early age. He related that the first English book his mother read to him was Misunderstood, by Florence Montgomery. Much to his patriotic father's disappointment, Nabokov could read and write in English before he could in Russian. In his memoir Speak, Memory, Nabokov recalls numerous details of his privileged childhood. His ability to recall his past in vivid detail was a boon to him during his permanent exile, providing a theme that runs from his first book, Mary, to later works such as Ada or Ardor: A Family Chronicle. While the family was nominally Orthodox, it had little religious fervor. Vladimir was not forced to attend church after he lost interest.

In 1916, Nabokov inherited the estate Rozhdestveno, next to Vyra, from his uncle Vasily Ivanovich Rukavishnikov ("Uncle Ruka" in Speak, Memory). He lost it in the October Revolution one year later; this was the only house he ever owned.

Nabokov's adolescence was the period in which he made his first serious literary endeavors. In 1916, he published his first book, Stikhi (Poems), a collection of 68 Russian poems. At the time he was attending Tenishev school in Saint Petersburg, where his literature teacher Vladimir Vasilievich Gippius had criticized his literary accomplishments. Some time after the publication of Stikhi, Zinaida Gippius, renowned poet and first cousin of his teacher, told Nabokov's father at a social event, "Please tell your son that he will never be a writer."

After the 1917 February Revolution, Nabokov's father became a secretary of the Russian Provisional Government in Saint Petersburg.

=== October Revolution ===
After the October Revolution, the family fled the city for Crimea, at first not expecting to be away for very long. They lived at a friend's estate and in September 1918 moved to Livadiya, at the time under the separatist Crimean Regional Government, in which Nabokov's father became a minister of justice.

=== London and Cambridge ===
After the withdrawal of the German Army in November 1918 and the defeat of the White Army in early 1919, the Nabokovs sought exile in western Europe, along with other Russian refugees. They settled initially in London, where they rented apartments in South Kensington and then Chelsea in 1919–20. Nabokov gained admittance to the University of Cambridge, where he attended Trinity College and studied zoology and later Slavic and Romance languages. His examination results on the first part of the Tripos exam, taken at the end of his second year, were a starred first. He took the second part of the exam in his fourth year just after his father's death, and feared he might fail it, but it was marked second-class. His final examination result also ranked second-class, and his BA was conferred in 1922. Nabokov later drew on his Cambridge and London experiences in several works, including the novels Glory and The Real Life of Sebastian Knight.

At Cambridge, one journalist wrote in 2014, "the coats-of-arms on the windows of his room protected him from the cold and from the melancholy over the recent loss of his country. It was in this city, in his moments of solitude, accompanied by King Lear, Le Morte d'Arthur, The Strange Case of Dr. Jekyll and Mr. Hyde or Ulysses, that Nabokov made the firm decision to become a Russian writer."

== Career ==
=== Berlin (1922–1937) ===
In 1920, Nabokov's family moved to Berlin, where his father set up the émigré newspaper Rul' ("Rudder"). Nabokov joined them in Berlin two years later, after completing his studies at Cambridge.

In March 1922, Russian monarchists Pyotr Shabelsky-Bork and Sergey Taboritsky shot and killed Nabokov's father in Berlin as he was shielding their target, Pavel Milyukov, a leader of the Constitutional Democratic Party-in-exile. Shortly after his father's death, Nabokov's mother and sister moved to Prague. Nabokov drew upon his father's death repeatedly in his fiction. On one interpretation of his novel Pale Fire, an assassin kills the poet John Shade when his target is a fugitive European monarch.

Nabokov stayed in Berlin, where he had become a recognised poet and writer in Russian within the émigré community; he published under the nom de plume V. Sirin (a reference to the fabulous bird of Russian folklore). To supplement his scant writing income, he taught languages and gave tennis and boxing lessons. Dieter E. Zimmer has written of Nabokov's 15 Berlin years, "he never became fond of Berlin, and at the end intensely disliked it. He lived within the lively Russian community of Berlin that was more or less self-sufficient, staying on after it had disintegrated because he had nowhere else to go to. He knew little German. He knew few Germans except for landladies, shopkeepers, and immigration officials at the police headquarters."

==== Marriage ====
In 1922, Nabokov became engaged to Svetlana Siewert, but she broke the engagement off early in 1923 when her parents worried whether he could provide for her. In May 1923, he met Véra Evseyevna Slonim, a Russian-Jewish woman, at a charity ball in Berlin. They married in April 1925. Their only child, Dmitri, was born in 1934.

In the course of 1936, Véra lost her job because of the increasingly antisemitic environment. Sergey Taboritsky was appointed deputy head of Germany's Russian-émigré bureau, and Nabokov began seeking a job in the English-speaking world.

=== France (1937–1940) ===
In January 1937, Nabokov left Berlin on a reading tour of Brussels, Paris and London, and never returned to Germany. In Paris he delivered a lecture in French, "Pouchkine, ou le vrai et le vraisemblable", later published in La Nouvelle Revue Française; James Joyce was in the audience. During this period he had a short affair with Irina Guadanini, also a Russian émigrée. His family followed him to France, making en route their last visit to Prague, then spent time in Cannes, Menton, Cap d'Antibes, and Fréjus, finally settling in Paris in 1938 in a small flat on the rue Boileau, in the 16th arrondissement. This city also had a Russian émigré community.

In 1938 Nabokov wrote two plays in Russian, The Event and The Waltz Invention. The Event was staged in Paris that year by the émigré Russian Theatre, directed by Yuri Annenkov. Aware that his Russian readership was shrinking, he turned to English and wrote his first novel in that language, The Real Life of Sebastian Knight, between December 1938 and January 1939, reportedly working in the flat's bathroom so as not to disturb his young son. Lucie Léon, wife of Joyce's secretary Paul Léon, checked his English in the manuscript, which remained unpublished until 1941. In 1939 he traveled to London in an unsuccessful search for a university post. His mother died in Prague in May 1939, and he was unable to attend her funeral.

In 1939, in Paris, Nabokov wrote the 55-page novella The Enchanter, his final work of Russian fiction. He later called it "the first little throb of Lolita."

In May 1940, the Nabokovs fled the advancing German troops, sailing from Saint-Nazaire to the United States aboard the SS Champlain, with part of their passage paid by the Hebrew Immigrant Aid Society. Nabokov's brother Sergey did not leave France, and he died at the Neuengamme concentration camp on 9 January 1945.

=== United States ===
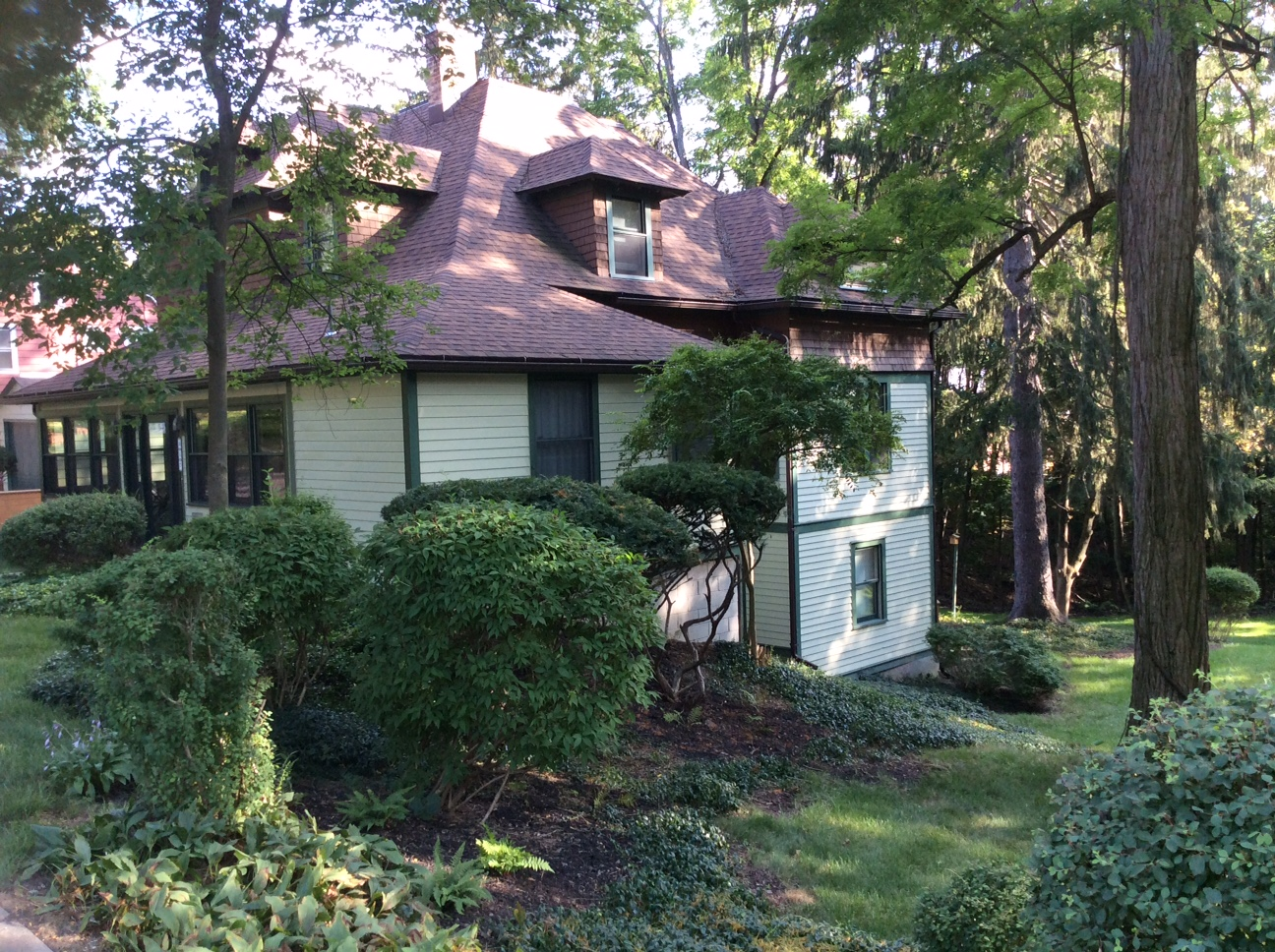
957 East State Street, Ithaca, New York, where Nabokov lived with his family while teaching at Cornell University

==== New York City (1940–1941) ====
The Nabokovs settled in Manhattan, and Nabokov began volunteer work as an entomologist at the American Museum of Natural History.

==== Wellesley College (1941–1948) ====
Nabokov joined the staff of Wellesley College in 1941 as resident lecturer in comparative literature. The position, created specifically for him, provided an income and free time to write creatively and pursue his lepidoptery. Nabokov is remembered as the founder of Wellesley's Russian department. The Nabokovs resided in Wellesley, Massachusetts, during the 1941–42 academic year. In September 1942, they moved to nearby Cambridge, where they lived until June 1948. Following a lecture tour through the United States, Nabokov returned to Wellesley for the 1944–45 academic year as a lecturer in Russian. In 1945, he became a naturalized citizen of the United States. He served through the 1947–48 term as Wellesley's one-man Russian department, offering courses in Russian language and literature. His classes were popular, due as much to his unique teaching style as to the wartime interest in all things Russian. At the same time he was the de facto curator of lepidoptery at Harvard University's Museum of Comparative Zoology.

==== Cornell University (1948–1959) ====
After being encouraged by Morris Bishop, Nabokov left Wellesley in 1948 to teach Russian and European literature at Cornell University, where he taught until 1959. Among his students at Cornell was future U.S. Supreme Court Justice Ruth Bader Ginsburg, who later identified Nabokov as a major influence on her development as a writer.

Nabokov wrote Lolita while traveling on the butterfly-collection trips in the Western United States that he undertook every summer. Véra acted as "secretary, typist, editor, proofreader, translator and bibliographer; his agent, business manager, legal counsel and chauffeur; his research assistant, teaching assistant and professorial understudy"; when Nabokov attempted to burn unfinished drafts of Lolita, Véra stopped him. He called her the best-humored woman he had ever known.

In June 1953, Nabokov and his family went to Ashland, Oregon. There he finished Lolita and began writing the novel Pnin. He roamed the nearby mountains looking for butterflies, and wrote a poem called "Lines Written in Oregon". On 1 October 1953, he and his family returned to Ithaca, where he later taught the young writer Thomas Pynchon.

=== Montreux (1961–1977) ===
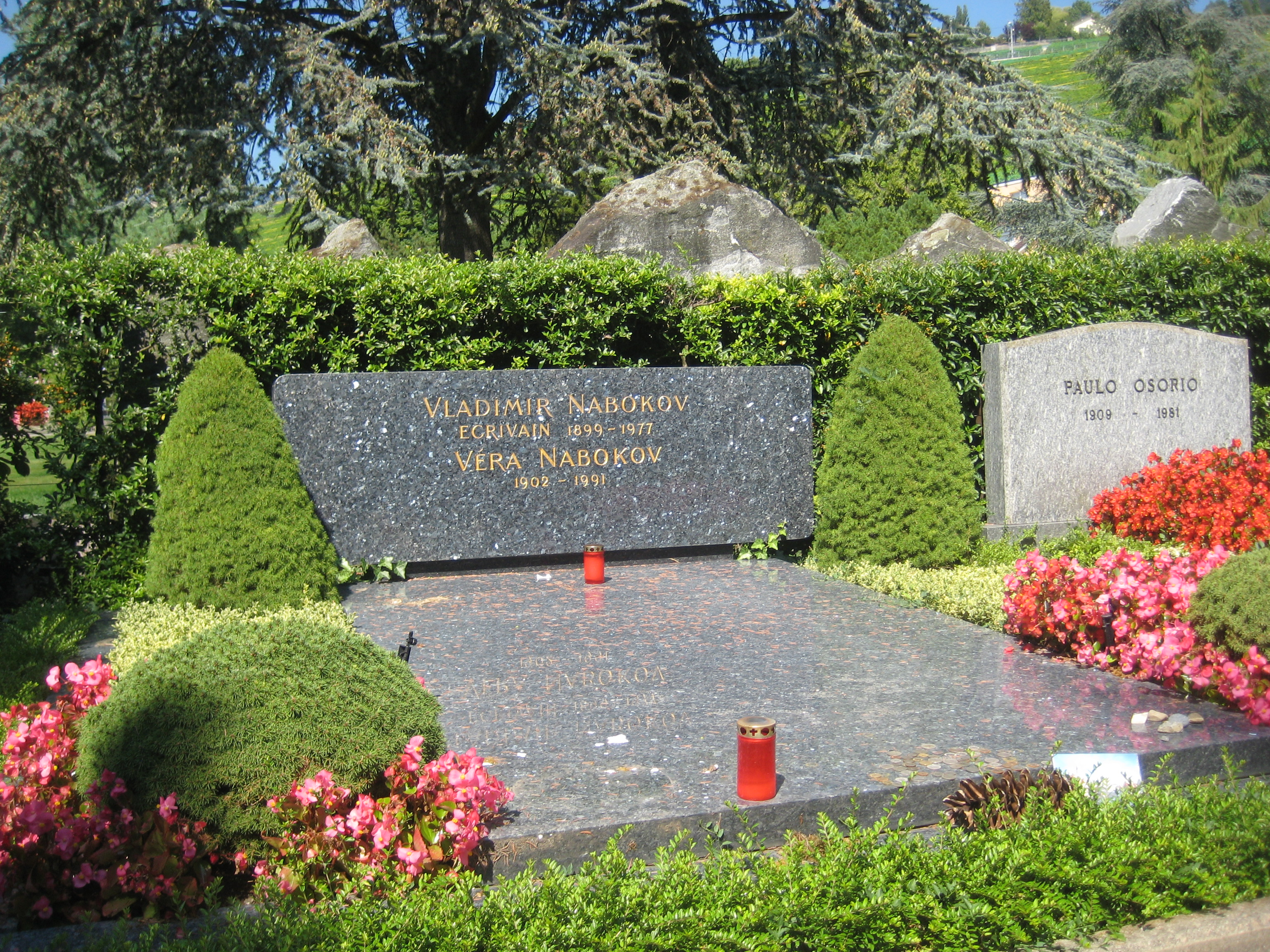
The Nabokovs' gravesite at Cimetière de Clarens near Montreux, Switzerland

After the great financial success of Lolita, Nabokov returned to Europe and devoted himself to writing. In 1961, he and Véra moved to the Montreux Palace Hotel in Montreux, Switzerland, where he remained until the end of his life. From his sixth-floor quarters, he conducted his business and took tours to the Alps, Corsica, and Sicily to hunt butterflies.

=== Death ===
Nabokov died of bronchitis on 2 July 1977 in Montreux. His remains were cremated and buried at Clarens cemetery in Montreux.

At the time of his death, he was working on a novel titled The Original of Laura. Véra and Dmitri, who were entrusted with Nabokov's literary executorship, ignored Nabokov's request to burn the incomplete manuscript and published it in 2009.

== Works ==
=== Critical reception and writing style ===
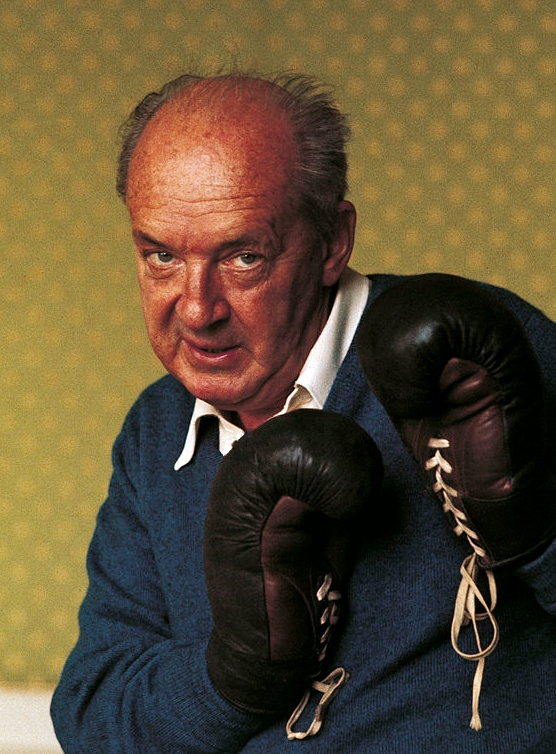
Nabokov in the 1960s

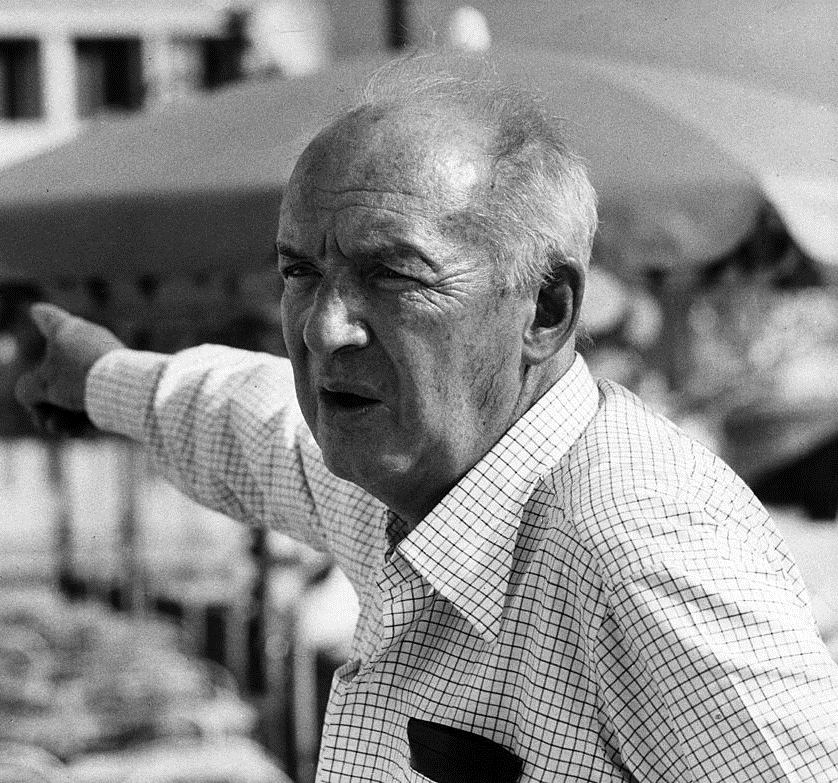
Nabokov in 1973

Nabokov is known as one of the leading prose stylists of the 20th century; his first writings were in Russian, but he achieved his greatest fame with the novels he wrote in English. As a trilingual (also writing in French, see Mademoiselle O) master, he has been compared to Joseph Conrad, but Nabokov disliked both the comparison and Conrad's work. He lamented to the critic Edmund Wilson, "I am too old to change Conradically"—which John Updike later called "itself a jest of genius". This lament came in 1941, when Nabokov had been an apprentice American for less than one year. Later, in a November 1950 letter to Wilson, Nabokov offers a solid, non-comic appraisal: "Conrad knew how to handle readymade English better than I; but I know better the other kind. He never sinks to the depths of my solecisms, but neither does he scale my verbal peaks." Nabokov translated many of his own early works into English, sometimes in collaboration with his son, Dmitri. But he always translated the poems embedded in his novels and short stories himself (such as the cycle of poems in his novel The Gift).

Nabokov himself translated into Russian two books he originally wrote in English, Conclusive Evidence and Lolita. The "translation" of Conclusive Evidence was made because Nabokov felt that the English version was imperfect. Writing the book, he noted that he needed to translate his own memories into English and to spend time explaining things that are well known in Russia; he decided to rewrite the book in his native language before making the final version, Speak, Memory (Nabokov first wanted to name it "Speak, Mnemosyne"). Of translating Lolita, Nabokov writes, "I imagined that in some distant future somebody might produce a Russian version of Lolita. I trained my inner telescope upon that particular point in the distant future and I saw that every paragraph, pock-marked as it is with pitfalls, could lend itself to hideous mistranslation. In the hands of a harmful drudge, the Russian version of Lolita would be entirely degraded and botched by vulgar paraphrases or blunders. So I decided to translate it myself."

Nabokov was a proponent of individualism, and rejected concepts and ideologies that curtailed individual freedom and expression, such as totalitarianism in its various forms, as well as Sigmund Freud's psychoanalysis. Poshlost, or as he transcribed it, poshlust, is disdained and frequently mocked in his works.

Nabokov's creative processes involved writing sections of text on hundreds of index cards, which he expanded into paragraphs and chapters and rearranged to form the structure of his novels, a process that many screenwriters later adopted.

Nabokov published under the pseudonym Vladimir Sirin in the 1920s to 1940s, occasionally to mask his identity from critics. He also makes cameo appearances in some of his novels, such as the character Vivian Darkbloom (an anagram of "Vladimir Nabokov"), who appears in both Lolita and Ada, or Ardor, and the character Blavdak Vinomori (another anagram of Nabokov's name) in King, Queen, Knave. Sirin is referenced as a different émigré author in his memoir and is also referenced in Pnin.

Nabokov is noted for his complex plots, clever word play, daring metaphors, and prose style capable of both parody and intense lyricism. He gained both fame and notoriety with Lolita (1955), which recounts a middle-aged man's consuming passion for a 12-year-old girl. This and his other novels, particularly Pale Fire (1962), won him a place among the greatest novelists of the 20th century and multiple nominations for the Nobel Prize in Literature.

His longest novel, which met with a mixed response, is Ada (1969). He devoted more time to the composition of it than to any other. Nabokov's fiction is characterized by linguistic playfulness. For example, his short story "The Vane Sisters" is famous in part for its acrostic final paragraph, in which the words' first letters spell a message from beyond the grave. Another of his short stories, "Signs and Symbols", features a character suffering from a fictional illness called "Referential Mania", which drives him to perceive the world as being suffused with coded messages.

Nabokov's stature as a literary critic is founded largely on his four-volume translation of and commentary on Alexander Pushkin's Eugene Onegin published in 1964. The commentary ends with an appendix titled Notes on Prosody, which has developed a reputation of its own. It stemmed from his observation that while Pushkin's iambic tetrameters had been a part of Russian literature for a fairly short two centuries, they were clearly understood by the Russian prosodists. On the other hand, he viewed the much older English iambic tetrameters as muddled and poorly documented. In his own words:

I have been forced to invent a simple little terminology of my own, explain its application to English verse forms, and indulge in certain rather copious details of classification before even tackling the limited object of these notes to my translation of Pushkin's Eugene Onegin, an object that boils down to very little—in comparison to the forced preliminaries—namely, to a few things that the non-Russian student of Russian literature must know in regard to Russian prosody in general and to Eugene Onegin in particular.

=== Cornell University lectures ===
Nabokov's lectures at Cornell University, as collected in Lectures on Literature, put forth his controversial ideas concerning art. He believed that novels should not aim to teach and that readers should not merely empathize with characters but that a "higher" aesthetic enjoyment should be attained, partly by paying great attention to details of style and structure. He detested what he saw as "general ideas" in novels, and so when teaching Ulysses, for example, he would insist that students keep an eye on where the characters were in Dublin (with the aid of a map) rather than teaching the complex Irish history that many critics see as essential to understanding the novel. Nabokov also wanted his students to describe the details of the novels rather than a narrative of the story and was very strict when it came to grading. Edward Jay Epstein wrote of his experience in Nabokov's classes that Nabokov made clear from the first lectures that he had little interest in fraternizing with students, who would be known not by their name but by their seat number. In 2010, Kitsch magazine, a student publication at Cornell, published a piece that focused on student reflections on his lectures and explored Nabokov's long relationship with Playboy.

== Influence ==
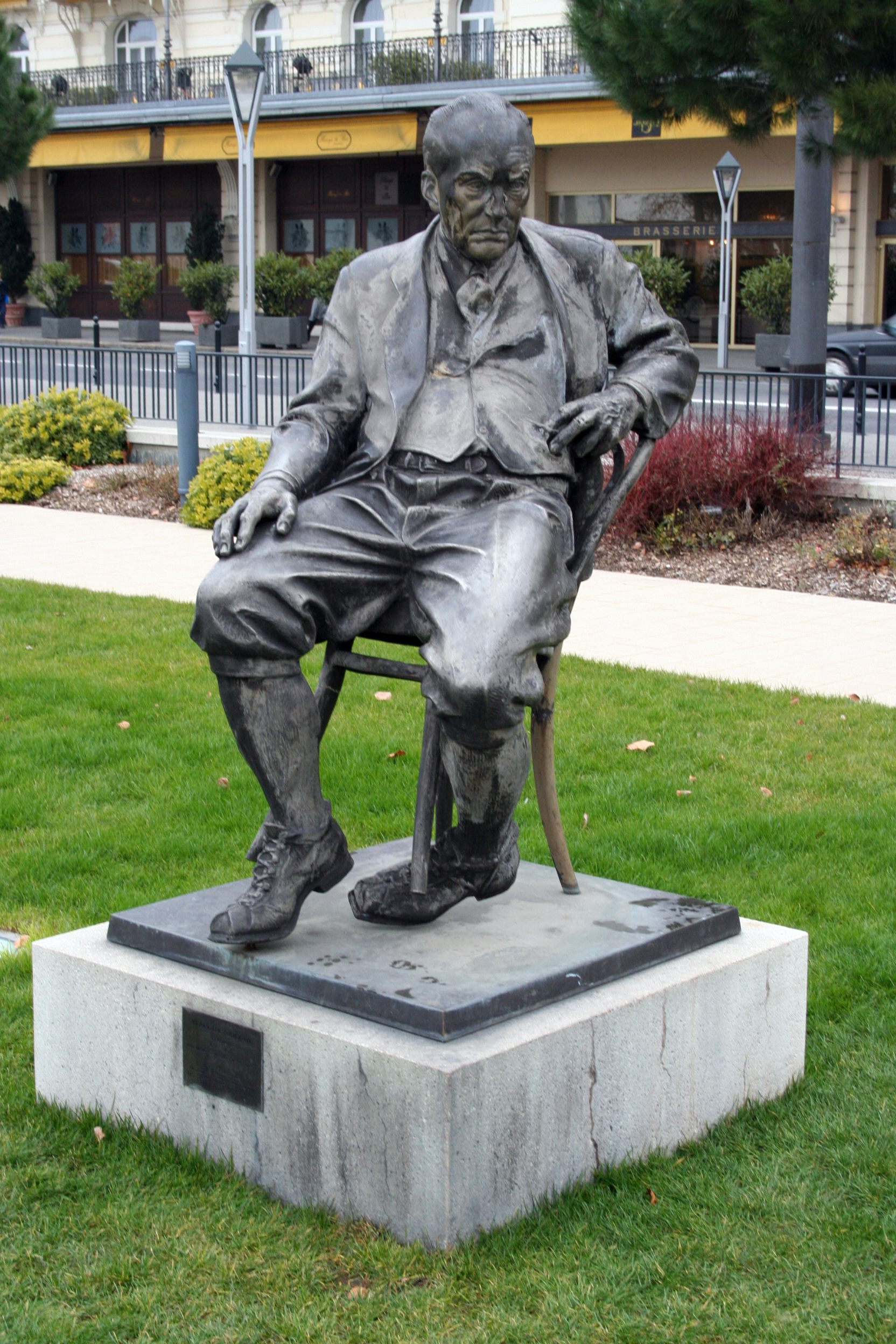
Statue of Nabokov in Montreux, Switzerland

External videos
- Nabokov Centenary Celebration hosted by New Yorker magazine, April 15, 1999, C-SPAN

The Russian literary critic Yuly Aykhenvald was an early admirer of Nabokov, citing in particular his ability to imbue objects with life: "he saturates trivial things with life, sense and psychology and gives a mind to objects; his refined senses notice colorations and nuances, smells and sounds, and everything acquires an unexpected meaning and truth under his gaze and through his words." The critic James Wood argues that Nabokov's use of descriptive detail proved an "overpowering, and not always very fruitful, influence on two or three generations after him", including authors such as Martin Amis and John Updike. While a student at Cornell in the 1950s, Thomas Pynchon attended several of Nabokov's lectures. His debut novel V. resembles The Real Life of Sebastian Knight in plot, character, narration and style, and the title alludes directly to the narrator "V." in that novel. Pynchon also alluded to Lolita in his 1966 novel The Crying of Lot 49, in which Serge, countertenor in the band the Paranoids, sings:

What chance has a lonely surfer boy
For the love of a surfer chick,
With all these Humbert Humbert cats
Coming on so big and sick?
For me, my baby was a woman,
For him she's just another nymphet.

Pynchon's prose style was influenced by Nabokov's preference for actualism over realism. Of the authors who came to prominence during Nabokov's life, John Banville, Don DeLillo, Salman Rushdie, and Edmund White were all influenced by him. The novelist John Hawkes took inspiration from Nabokov and considered himself his follower. Nabokov's story "Signs and Symbols" was on the reading list for Hawkes's writing students at Brown University. "A writer who truly and greatly sustains us is Vladimir Nabokov," Hawkes said in a 1964 interview.

Several authors who came to prominence in the 1990s and 2000s have also cited Nabokov's work as a literary influence. Aleksandar Hemon has acknowledged the latter's impact on his writing. Pulitzer Prize-winning novelist Michael Chabon listed Lolita and Pale Fire among the "books that, I thought, changed my life when I read them", and has said, "Nabokov's English combines aching lyricism with dispassionate precision in a way that seems to render every human emotion in all its intensity but never with an ounce of schmaltz or soggy language". T. Coraghessan Boyle has said that "Nabokov's playfulness and the ravishing beauty of his prose are ongoing influences" on his writing. Bilingual author and critic Maxim D. Shrayer, who came to the U.S. as a refugee from the USSR, described reading Nabokov in 1987 as "my culture shock": "I was reading Nabokov and waiting for America."

Nabokov appears in W. G. Sebald's 1993 novel The Emigrants.

A crater on the planet Mercury was named after Nabokov in 2012.

=== Adaptations ===
The song cycle "Sing, Poetry" on the 2011 contemporary classical album Troika comprises settings of Russian and English versions of three of Nabokov's poems by such composers as Jay Greenberg, Michael Schelle and Lev Zhurbin.

== Entomology ==
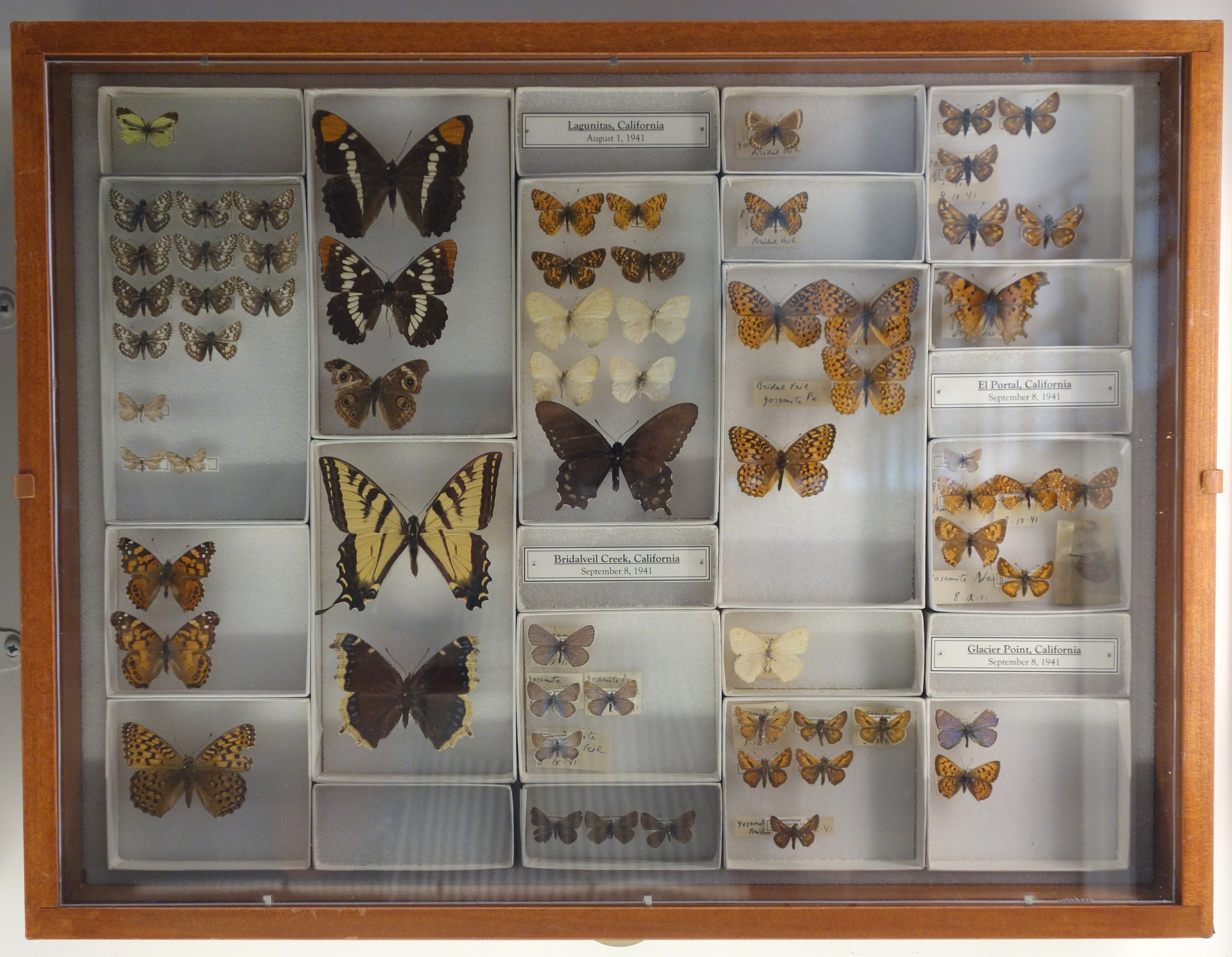
Butterflies collected by Nabokov in California in 1941 at the American Museum of Natural History

Nabokov's interest in entomology was inspired by books by Maria Sibylla Merian he found in the attic of his family's country home in Vyra. Throughout an extensive career of collecting, he never learned to drive a car, and depended on his wife to take him to collecting sites. During the 1940s, as a research fellow in zoology, he was responsible for organizing the butterfly collection of Harvard University's Museum of Comparative Zoology. He published 18 scientific articles on lepidoptery and named 12 valid species and genera. His writings in this area were highly technical. This, combined with his specialty in the relatively unspectacular tribe Polyommatini of the family Lycaenidae, has left this facet of his life little explored by most admirers of his literary works. He described the Karner blue. The genus Nabokovia was named after him in honor of this work, as were a number of butterfly and moth species (e.g., many species in the genera Madeleinea and Pseudolucia bear epithets alluding to Nabokov or names from his novels). In 1967, Nabokov commented: "The pleasures and rewards of literary inspiration are nothing beside the rapture of discovering a new organ under the microscope or an undescribed species on a mountainside in Iran or Peru. It is not improbable that had there been no revolution in Russia, I would have devoted myself entirely to lepidopterology and never written any novels at all."

The Harvard Museum of Natural History, which now contains the Museum of Comparative Zoology, still possesses Nabokov's "genitalia cabinet", where the author stored his collection of male blue butterfly genitalia. "Nabokov was a serious taxonomist," says museum staff writer Nancy Pick, author of The Rarest of the Rare: Stories Behind the Treasures at the Harvard Museum of Natural History. "He actually did quite a good job at distinguishing species that you would not think were different—by looking at their genitalia under a microscope six hours a day, seven days a week, until his eyesight was permanently impaired."

Though professional lepidopterists did not take Nabokov's work seriously during his life, new genetic research supports Nabokov's hypothesis that a group of butterfly species, called the Polyommatus blues, came to the New World over the Bering Strait in five waves, eventually reaching Chile.

== Politics and views ==
=== Russian politics ===
Russia has always been a curiously unpleasant country despite her great literature. Unfortunately, Russians today have completely lost their ability to kill tyrants.

— Vladimir Nabokov

Nabokov was a classical liberal, in the tradition of his father, a liberal statesman who served in the Provisional Government following the February Revolution of 1917 as a member of the Constitutional Democratic Party. In Speak, Memory, Nabokov proudly recounted his father's campaigns against despotism and staunch opposition to capital punishment. Nabokov was a self-proclaimed "White Russian", and was, from its inception, a strong opponent of the Soviet government that had seized his property and estates following the Bolshevik Revolution of October 1917. In a poem he wrote as a teenager in 1917, he called Lenin's Bolsheviks "grey rag-tag people".

Throughout his life, Nabokov would remain committed to the classical liberal political philosophy of his father, and equally opposed Tsarist autocracy, communism, and fascism. Nabokov's father, Vladimir Dmitrievich Nabokov, was one of the most outspoken defenders of Jewish rights in the Russian Empire, continuing a family tradition that had been led by his own father, Dmitry Nabokov, who as Tsar Alexander II's justice minister had blocked the interior minister from passing antisemitic measures. That family strain continued in Vladimir Nabokov, who fiercely denounced antisemitism in his writings; in the 1930s, he was able to escape Hitler's Germany only with the help of Russian Jewish émigrés who still had grateful memories of his family's defense of Jews in Tsarist times.

When asked in 1969 whether he would like to revisit the land he fled in 1918, now the Soviet Union, he replied: "There's nothing to look at. New tenement houses and old churches do not interest me. The hotels there are terrible. I detest the Soviet theater. Any palace in Italy is superior to the repainted abodes of the Tsars. The village huts in the forbidden hinterland are as dismally poor as ever, and the wretched peasant flogs his wretched cart horse with the same wretched zest. As to my special northern landscape and the haunts of my childhood—well, I would not wish to contaminate their images preserved in my mind."

=== American politics ===
In the 1940s, as an émigré in America, Nabokov stressed the connection between American and English liberal democracy and the aspirations of the short-lived Russian provisional government. In 1942, he declared: "Democracy is humanity at its best ... it is the natural condition of every man ever since the human mind became conscious not only of the world but of itself." During the 1960s, in both letters and interviews, he reveals a profound contempt for the New Left movements, calling the protesters "conformists" and "goofy hoodlums".

In a 1967 interview, Nabokov said that he refused to associate with supporters of Bolshevism or Tsarist autocracy but that he had "friends among intellectual constitutional monarchists as well as among intellectual social revolutionaries". Nabokov supported the Vietnam War effort and voiced admiration for both Presidents Lyndon B. Johnson and Richard Nixon. Racism against African-Americans appalled Nabokov, who touted Alexander Pushkin's multiracial background as an argument against racial segregation.

=== Views on women writers ===
Nabokov's wife Véra was his strongest supporter and assisted him throughout his life, but Nabokov admitted to a "prejudice" against women writers. He wrote to Edmund Wilson, who had been making suggestions for his lectures: "I dislike Jane Austen, and am prejudiced, in fact against all women writers. They are in another class." But after rereading Austen's Mansfield Park he changed his mind and taught it in his literature course; he also praised Mary McCarthy's work and called Marina Tsvetaeva a "poet of genius" in Speak, Memory. Although Véra worked as his personal translator and secretary, he made publicly known that his ideal translator would be male, and especially not a "Russian-born female". In the first chapter of Glory he attributes the protagonist's similar prejudice to the impressions made by children's writers like Lidiya Charski, and the short story "The Admiralty Spire" deplores the posturing, snobbery, antisemitism, and cutesiness he considered characteristic of Russian women authors.

== Personal life ==
=== Allegations of pedophilia ===
Speculation about Nabokov's relationship to pedophilia began with Lolita's publication, when critics like John Gordon of the London Sunday Express denounced it as "sheer unrestrained pornography", raising questions about why someone would write such material. In 1990, the psychiatrist Brandon Centerwall published the most direct accusation, arguing in Texas Studies in Literature and Language that Nabokov was a "closet pedophile" whose repeated literary treatment of the theme across decades reflected personal compulsion. Centerwall expanded his thesis in a 1992 article, citing evidence such as Nabokov's use of the term "nymphet" in authorial commentary, the doubled structure of "Humbert Humbert" mirroring "Vladimir Vladimirovich", and biographical details about his alleged sexual abuse by his uncle Vassili Rukavishnikov as indicative of Nabokov's pedophilia. Rukavishnikov, affectionately known to his contemporaries as "Ruka" (meaning "hand" in Russian, a nickname given by the estate staff to signify his tendency of fondling young peasant children) bequeathed his estate to Nabokov, who lost it in the Bolshevik Revolution just a year later. In his biography of Nabokov, Brian Boyd writes that Ruka engaged in inappropriate physical contact with him but draws no conclusions about Nabokov's sexuality from that.

The scholarly consensus in Nabokov studies remains that Nabokov's personal conduct toward children "was, and remains, unimpeachable", with most academics viewing his literary exploration of pedophilia as an expression of empathy for victims rather than a confession.

=== Synesthesia ===
Nabokov was a self-described synesthete, who at a young age equated the number five with the color red. Aspects of synesthesia can be found in several of his works. His wife also exhibited synesthesia; like her husband, her mind's eye associated colors with particular letters. They discovered that Dmitri shared the trait, and moreover that the colors he associated with some letters were in some cases blends of his parents' hues—"which is as if genes were painting in aquarelle". Nabokov also wrote that his mother had synesthesia, and that she had different letter-color pairs.

For some synesthetes, letters are not simply associated with certain colors, they are themselves colored. Nabokov frequently endowed his protagonists with a similar gift. In Bend Sinister, Krug comments on his perception of the word "loyalty" as like a golden fork lying out in the sun. In The Defense, Nabokov briefly mentions that the main character's father, a writer, found he was unable to complete a novel that he planned to write, becoming lost in the fabricated storyline by "starting with colors". Many other subtle references are made in Nabokov's writing that can be traced back to his synesthesia. Many of his characters have a distinct "sensory appetite" reminiscent of synesthesia.

Nabokov described his synesthesia at length in his autobiography Speak, Memory:

I present a fine case of colored hearing. Perhaps "hearing" is not quite accurate, since the color sensations seem to be produced by the very act of my orally forming a given letter while I imagine its outline. The long a of the English alphabet (and it is this alphabet I have in mind farther on unless otherwise stated) has for me the tint of weathered wood, but the French a evokes polished ebony. This black group also includes hard g (vulcanized rubber) and r (a sooty rag being ripped). Oatmeal n, noodle-limp l, and the ivory-backed hand mirror of o take care of the whites. I am puzzled by my French on which I see as the brimming tension-surface of alcohol in a small glass. Passing on to the blue group, there is steely x, thundercloud z, and huckleberry k. Since a subtle interaction exists between sound and shape, I see q as browner than k, while s is not the light blue of c, but a curious mixture of azure and mother-of-pearl.

=== Religion ===
Nabokov was a religious agnostic. He was very open about, and received criticism for, his indifference to organized mysticism, to religion, and to any church.

=== Sleep ===
Nabokov was a notorious, lifelong insomniac who admitted unease at the prospect of sleep, once saying, "the night is always a giant". Later in life his insomnia was exacerbated by an enlarged prostate. Nabokov called sleep a "moronic fraternity", "mental torture", and a "nightly betrayal of reason, humanity, genius". Insomnia's impact on his work has been widely explored, and in 2017 Princeton University Press published a compilation of his dream diary entries, Insomniac Dreams: Experiments with Time by Vladimir Nabokov.

=== Chess problems ===
Nabokov spent considerable time during his exile composing chess problems, which he published in Germany's Russian émigré press, Poems and Problems (18 problems) and Speak, Memory (one). He describes the process of composing and constructing in his memoir: "The strain on the mind is formidable; the element of time drops out of one's consciousness". To him, the "originality, invention, conciseness, harmony, complexity, and splendid insincerity" of creating a chess problem was similar to that in any other art.

== List of works ==
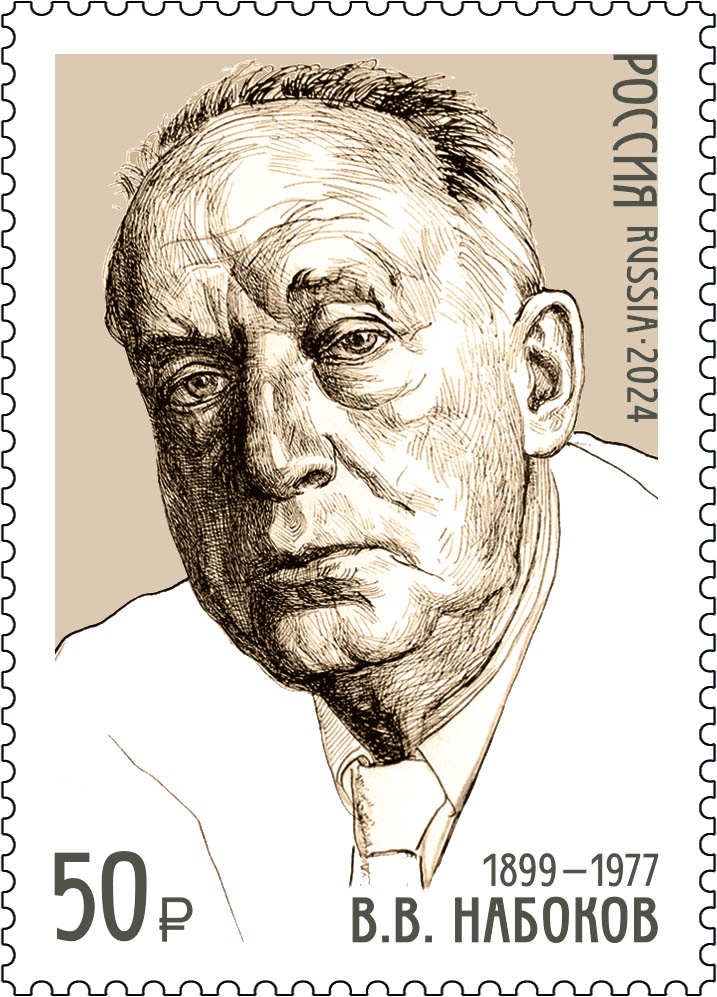
Nabokov on a 2024 postal stamp of Russia

Main works written in Russian

- (1926) Mary
- (1928) King, Queen, Knave
- (1930) The Luzhin Defense or The Defense
- (1930) The Eye
- (1932) Glory
- (1933) Laughter in the Dark
- (1934) Despair
- (1936) Invitation to a Beheading
- (1938) The Gift
- (1939) The Enchanter

Main works written in English

- (1941) The Real Life of Sebastian Knight
- (1947) Bend Sinister
- (1955) Lolita, self-translated into Russian (1965)
- (1957) Pnin
- (1962) Pale Fire
- (1967) Speak, Memory: An Autobiography Revisited
- (1969) Ada or Ardor: A Family Chronicle
- (1972) Transparent Things
- (1974) Look at the Harlequins!
- (2009) The Original of Laura (fragmentary; written during the mid-1970s and published posthumously)

== See also ==
- List of Russian Academy Award winners and nominees
