= Ada, or Ardor: A Family Chronicle =

1969 novel by Vladimir Nabokov

Ada, or Ardor
- First Edition Cover
- Author: Vladimir Nabokov
- Language: English
- Genre: Science fiction, alternate history
- Published: 1969
- Publisher: McGraw Hill
- Publication place: United States
- Media type: Print (hardback & paperback)
- Pages: 626
- Website: Official website

Ada, or Ardor: A Family Chronicle is a novel by Vladimir Nabokov. It was originally published in 1969 by McGraw Hill Book Company and is currently published by Penguin Random House.

Ada, or Ardor began to materialize in 1959, when Nabokov was flirting with two projects, "The Texture of Time" and "Letters from Terra." In 1965, he began to see a link between the two ideas, finally composing a unified novel from February 1966 to October 1968. The published cumulation would become his longest work. Ada was initially given a mixed reception. However, writing in The New York Times Book Review, noted scholar Alfred Appel called it "a great work of art, a necessary book, radiant and rapturous," and said that it "provides further evidence that he is a peer of Kafka, Proust and Joyce."

== Title ==
According to David Eagleman, Nabokov named the title character in part after his favorite butterfly. An avid professional collector of butterflies, Nabokov especially liked a particular species with yellow wings and a black body. As a synesthete, he associated colors with each letter; A with yellow, and D with black. Thus he saw a reflection of his favorite butterfly (yellow-black-yellow) in the name "Ada." His character, Ada, wanted to be a lepidopterist.

"Ada" is also a pun, a homophone, for "Ardor." Marina, Ada's mother, pronounces her name with "long, deep" Russian "A"s, which is how a speaker of non-rhotic English would say the word "Ardor." Ada's name includes a play on Ad (Ад), Russian for Hell, which serves as a theme throughout the story.

== Plot summary ==
Ada, or Ardor tells the life story of a man named Van Veen, and his lifelong love affair with his sister Ada. They meet when she is eleven (soon to be twelve) and he is fourteen, believing that they are cousins (more precisely: that their fathers are cousins and that their mothers are sisters), and begin a sexual affair. They later discover that Van's father is also Ada's and her mother is also his, hence they themselves are genealogically both third cousins (a relationship both putative and actual) and siblings. The story follows the various interruptions and resumptions of their affair. Both are wealthy, educated, and intelligent. The book itself takes the form of his memoir, written when he is in his nineties, punctuated with his own and Ada's marginalia, and in parts with notes by an unnamed editor which suggest that the manuscript is not complete.

The novel is divided into five parts. As they progress chronologically, this structure evokes a sense of a person reflecting on his own memories, with an adolescence stretching out epically, and many later years simply flashing by.

=== Setting ===
The story takes place in the late nineteenth century on Demonia or Antiterra, which appears to be an alternative history of Earth. Antiterra has the same geography and a largely similar history to that of Earth; however, it is crucially different at various points. For example, the United States includes all of the Americas (which were discovered by African navigators). But it was also settled extensively by Russians, so that what we know as western Canada is a Russian-speaking province called "Estoty", and eastern Canada a French-speaking province called "Canady". Russian, English, and French are all in use in North America. The territory which belongs to Russia in our world, and much of Asia, is part of an empire called Tartary, while the word "Russia" is simply a "quaint synonym" for Estoty. The British Empire, which includes most or all of Europe and Africa, is ruled (in the nineteenth century) by a King Victor. A city named Manhattan takes the place of our universe's New York City. Aristocracy is still widespread, but some technology has advanced well into twentieth-century forms. Electricity, however, has been banned since almost the time of its discovery following an event referred to as "the L-disaster". Airplanes and cars exist, but television and telephones do not; their functions are served by similar devices powered by water. The setting is thus a complex mixture of Russia and America in the nineteenth and twentieth centuries.

The belief in a "twin" world, Terra, is widespread on Antiterra as a sort of fringe religion or mass hallucination. (The name "Antiterra" may be a back-formation from this; the planet is "really" called "Demonia".) One of Van's early specialties as a psychologist is researching and working with people who believe that they are somehow in contact with Terra. Terra's alleged history, so far as he states it, appears to be that of our world: that is, the characters in the novel dream, or hallucinate, about the real world.

The central characters are all members of the North American aristocracy, of mostly Russian and Irish descent. Dementiy ("Demon") Veen is first cousins with Daniel Veen. They marry a pair of twin sisters, Aqua and Marina, respectively, who are also their second cousins. Demon and Aqua raise a son, Ivan (Van); Dan and Marina raise two daughters, Ada and Lucette. The story begins when Van, aged 14, spends a summer with his cousins, then 12 and 8. A rough idea of the years covered by each section is provided in brackets, below, however the narrator's thoughts often stray outside of the periods noted.

=== Part 1: 43 chapters (1863–1888) ===
This part, which Alfred Appel Jr. called "the last 19th-century Russian novel", takes up nearly half the book. Throughout this part of the novel, the many passages depicting the blossoming of Van and Ada's love vary in rhythm, style and vocabulary—ranging from lustrous, deceptively simple yet richly sensual prose to leering and Baroque satire of eighteenth-century pornography—depending on the mood Nabokov wishes to convey.

The first four chapters provide a sort of unofficial prologue, in that they move swiftly back and forth through the chronology of the narrative, but mostly deal with events between 1863 and 1884, when the main thrust of the story commences. They depict Van and Ada discovering their true relationship, Demon and Marina's tempestuous affair, Marina's sister Aqua's descent into madness and obsession with Terra and water, and Van's "first love", a girl he sees in an antique shop but never speaks to. Chapters 4 to 43 mostly deal with Van's adolescence, and his first meetings with his "cousin" Ada—focused on the two summers when he joins her (and her sister Lucette) at Ardis Hall, their ancestral home, in 1884 and 1888.

In 1884, Van and Ada, aged 14 and 12 respectively, fall passionately in love, and their affair is marked by a powerful sense of romantic eroticism. The book opens with their discovery that they are, in fact, not cousins, but brother and sister. The passage is notoriously difficult, more so as neither of them explicitly states the conclusion they have drawn (treating it as obvious), and it is only referred to in passing later in the text. Although Ada's mother keeps a wedding photo dated August 1871, eleven months before her birth, they find in a box in the attic a newspaper announcement dating the wedding to December 1871; and furthermore that Dan had been abroad since that spring, as proved by his extensive film reels. Hence, he is not Ada's father. Furthermore, they find an annotated flower album kept by Marina in 1869–70 which indicates, very obliquely, that she was pregnant and confined to a sanatorium at the same time as Aqua; that 99 orchids were delivered to Marina, from Demon, on Van's birthday; and that Aqua had a miscarriage in a skiing accident. It later transpires that Marina gave the child to her sister to replace the one she had lost—so she is in fact Van's mother—and that her affair with Demon continued until Ada's conception. This makes Lucette (Dan and Marina's child) the uterine half-sister of both of them.

Van returns to Ardis for a second visit in the summer of 1888. The affair has become strained because of Van's suspicions that Ada has had another lover and the increasing intrusion of Lucette (their now-12-year-old half-sister) into their trysts (an intrusion that Van half-welcomes with conflicted feelings). This section ends with Van's discovery that Ada has in fact been unfaithful, and his flight from Ardis to exact revenge upon those "rivals" of whom he is aware: Phillip Rack, Ada's older and weak-charactered music teacher; and Percy de Prey, a rather boorish neighbor. Van is distracted by a chance altercation with a soldier named Tapper, whom he challenges to a duel and by whom he is wounded. In the hospital, he chances upon Phillip Rack, who is dying, and whom Van cannot bring himself to exact revenge upon. He then receives word that Percy de Prey has been shot and killed in Antiterra's version of the ongoing Crimean War. Van moves to live with Cordula de Prey, Percy's cousin, in her Manhattan apartment, whilst he fully recovers. They have a shallow physical relationship, which provides Van with respite from the emotional strain of his feelings for Ada.

=== Part 2: 11 chapters (1888–1893) ===
Van spends his time developing his studies in psychology and visiting a number of the "Villa Venus" upper-class brothels. In the autumn of 1892, Lucette, now having declared her love for Van, brings him a letter from Ada in which she announces she has received an offer of marriage from a wealthy Russian, Andrey Vinelander. Should Van wish to invite her to live with him, she will refuse the marriage offer. Van does so, and they commence living together in an apartment Van has purchased from Ada's old school-friend, and Van's former lover, Cordula de Prey.

In February 1893, their father, Demon, arrives at Van's apartment with news that his cousin Dan (Ada's supposed father, but actual stepfather) has died following a period of exposure caused by running naked into the woods near his home during a terrifying hallucinatory episode. When Ada walks in on them naked from a shower, he immediately grasps the situation and leaves; he later tells Van that Ada would be happier if he "gave her up"—and that he will disown Van if he fails to do so. Van acquiesces, leaves, and attempts suicide; his gun, however, fails to fire. He then leaves his Manhattan apartment and preoccupies himself with hunting down a former servant at Ardis, Kim Beauharnais, who had been blackmailing them with photographic evidence of their affair, and savagely beating him with an alpenstock until he is blind.

=== Part 3: 8 chapters (1893–1922) ===
With Ada having married Andrey Vinelander, Van occupies himself in traveling and his studies until 1901, when Lucette reappears in England. She has herself booked on the same transatlantic liner, the Admiral Tobakoff, that Van is taking back to America. She attempts to seduce him on the crossing and nearly succeeds, but is foiled when Ada appears in the film Don Juan's Last Fling, which they watch on board. Lucette then consumes several sleeping pills and commits suicide by throwing herself from the Tobakoff into the Atlantic.

In March 1905, Demon dies in a plane crash. Later that year, Ada and Andrey arrive in Switzerland. Van meets with them, and has an affair with Ada whilst pretending that they are engaged in uncovering Lucette's fortune (supposedly concealed in various hidden bank accounts). They hatch a plot for her to abandon Andrey, a plan they now consider feasible due to Demon's death. During their stay in Switzerland, however, Andrey falls ill with tuberculosis, and Ada decides that she cannot abandon him until he has recovered. Van and Ada part, and Andrey remains ill for 17 years, at which point he dies. Ada then flies back to Switzerland to meet with Van.

=== Part 4: Not subdivided (i.e., 1 chapter) (1922) ===
This part comprises Van's lecture The Texture of Time, apparently transcribed from his reading it into a tape recorder as he drives across Europe from the Adriatic to meet Ada in Mont Roux, Switzerland, while she herself is en route from America via Geneva. The transcription is then edited to merge into a description of his and Ada's actual meeting, and then out again. This makes this part of the novel notoriously self-referential, and hence has been cited as the "difficult" part of the novel, to the extent that some reviewers stated that they wished Vladimir Nabokov had "left it out". It could conversely be argued that this is but one of the most potent evocations of one of the novel's central themes: "... the interpenetration of ineffable romance and ineluctable reality."

Van and Ada ultimately reunite and begin living together.

=== Part 5: 6 chapters (1922–1967) ===
This section of the novel is set in 1967, as Van completes his memoirs as laid out in Ada or Ardor: A Family Chronicle. He describes his contentment, such as it is, his relationship with his book, and the continuing presence of, and his love for, Ada. This swan song is interspersed with remarks on pain and the ravages of time. Van and Ada have a conversation about death, and Van breaks off from correcting what he considers his essentially complete, but not yet fully polished, work. The book climaxes with Van and Ada merging into "Vaniada, Dava or Vada, Vanda and Anda".

== Characters ==
- Van Veen (Ivan Dementevich Veen, b. January 1, 1870): the homophony of the name is perhaps a suggestion from the film Vanina Vanini by Roberto Rossellini. When Nabokov was teaching at Cornell University in Ithaca (New York), he had a colleague with the Dutch surname of Van Veen; both lived on Highland Road, Cayuga Heights, and the name was painted on the mailbox outside their house.
- Ada (Adelaida Danilovna Veen, b. July 21, 1872): the heroine of the novel, lover of her cousin-brother Van, their love story will continue on and off until late in life; daughter of a film actress, she will follow in her mother's footsteps. Like Marina, she has black hair and a fair complexion.
- Marina Ivanovna Durmanov (1844–1900): Film actress. Having rejected the advances of Daniel Veen, preferring his more charming cousin Demon, she agrees to marry him when she is already pregnant with Ada: after a fiery month spent on vacation with Demon (during which she became pregnant), and faced with his refusal to divorce Aqua and marry her, she reconsiders her cousin's marriage proposal.
- Dementiy (Demon) Veen (1838–1905): Husband of Aqua Durmanova but in love with her sister, Marina. He is the father not only of Ada but also of Van. A shadow father, often absent, who imposes himself on Van with the example of a life devoted to pleasure.
- Aqua Ivanovna Durmanov (1844–1883): sister of Marina, as her names clearly indicate: aquamarina. During a skiing accident in Ex-en-Valais, Switzerland, the 6-month-old fetus she is carrying is killed and her sister Marina offers to replace it with the son she gave birth to two weeks earlier; in reality Aqua's madness does not even allow her to understand that she has miscarried.
- Daniel (Dan) Veen (1838–1893): a dull and grumpy but wealthy man, Daniel marries Marina Durmanov and is the father of Lucette. He visits the estate of Ardis and has only the most perfunctory relationship with his family and children.
- Lucette (Lucinda) Veen (1876–1901): Ada's younger sister, inherited her father Daniel's red hair and delicate complexion. From an early age she was in love with Van, and aware that he belonged sentimentally to her sister Ada.
- M.lle Larivière (Belle): governess of Ada and Lucette, a regular guest at Ardis Hall, publishes novels under the pseudonym of Monparnasse.
- Blanche: a good-looking maid at Ardis Hall, in love with Veen.
- Cordula de Prey: Ada's schoolmate, Percy's cousin. Has an affair with Van, then marries Ivan Tobak.
- Percy de Prey: neighbor of Ardis Hall, cousin of Cordula and always in love with Ada; she has given in to him a few times to console him after he was beaten by Van.
- Bouteillan: French servant of Ardis Hall.
- Philip Rack: German, Lucette Veen's music teacher and Ada's admirer.
- Andrey Andreevich Vinelander (1865–1922): husband of Ada, Russian-American landowner.
- Dorothy Vinelander: Andrey's sister.
- Violet Knox: Van Veen's secretary, types up the manuscript of his memories.

== Publication ==
The first fragments of the novel with the 8 chapters appeared in Playboy magazine (no. 4, 1969), and the complete novel was published in the US in May 1969 by McGraw-Hill Book Company. The British edition appeared in October of this year, published by Weidenfeld and Nicolson. In 1971, the "Penguin Books" series published Ada with footnotes by Vivian Darkbloom (a pseudonym and anagram of Vladimir Nabokov's first and last name).

=== Translations ===
Nabokov considered translating Ada into Russian himself, as he had done previously with Lolita. This intention did not come to fruition, but the writer supervised several translations of Ada into foreign languages, including Italian. The German translators had to personally consult the author three times and allow him to check the accuracy of the translation by visiting him in Montreux, Switzerland. Nabokov also interfered with the French translation, introducing many small changes to the original and essentially creating his own version of Ada in French. The first translation was the Italian one, published in 1969.

== Reception ==
The book was heavily promoted by McGraw-Hill, which contributed to its good sales results; Ada reached number four on The New York Times bestseller list, and reviews of it appeared on the front pages of major magazines.

Critics dispute whether Van and Ada die by suicide at the end, as the author says "if our time-racked flat-lying couple ever intended to die".

David Potter describes Van's narrated world in the memoir as "an unstable blending of contradictions, jarring fantastical elements, and hallucinated temporalities" over which Van is only partially in control. He argues that this is what makes the novel so notoriously difficult to interpret.

Garth Risk Hallberg found the book challenging, but also acclaimed its prose and argued that Nabokov "manages a kind of Proustian magic trick: he recovers, through evocation, the very things whose losses he depicts."

David Auerbach felt that both Ada and its lead characters were alienating, and believed that Nabokov knew readers would find them so. He considered Van Veen to be an unreliable narrator and speculates that much of the story is Van's fantasy, comparing Antiterra to the expressly fictional settings Nabokov created in Invitation to a Beheading, Bend Sinister and Pale Fire. In a discussion with the Kyoto reading circle, Brian Boyd finds this unconvincing; others have pointed out the lack of textual support for this hypothesis and several examples of fantastic worlds within Nabokov's work.

Matthew Hodgart writing for The New York Review of Books appreciated Ada for its excellent erotic fragments and the novel's linguistic layer.

Many critics have found autobiographical features in the novel, seeing the title character as a portrait of Véra Nabokov, the writer's wife. Nabokov reacted very violently to such insinuations and warned authors against such criticism. Such a warning was received, among others, by Matthew Hodgart and John Updike.

== Film adaptation ==
Already during its creation, the novel sparked the interest of filmmakers. Representatives of the film studios came to Nabokov to work out the details of the film adaptation of the not yet finished novel. One of them was Robert Evans of Paramount Pictures, who suggested to the author that Roman Polanski should handle the film adaptation of the work. Finally, in 1968, the film rights were purchased by Columbia Pictures for half a million dollars. Despite the acquisition of the rights to the novel for a film adaptation, the film was never made.

== See also ==
- Tlön, Uqbar, Orbis Tertius by Jorge Luis Borges
- René, Atala, Romance à Hélène and Mémoires d'Outre-Tombe by Chateaubriand
- The Man in the High Castle (1962) by Philip K. Dick
- The Ambidextrous Universe by Martin Gardner
