= The Defense =

1930 novel by Vladimir Nabokov

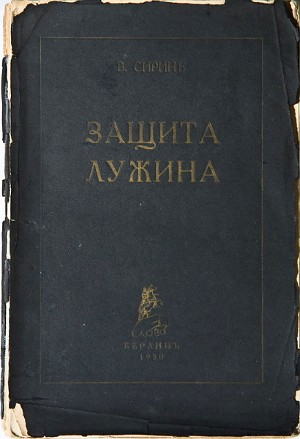
- First edition (Russian)
- Author: Vladimir Nabokov
- Original title: Защита Лужина (Zashchita Luzhina)
- Translator: Vladimir Nabokov and Michael Scammell
- Language: Russian
- Publisher: G. P. Putnam's Sons (English)
- Publication date: 1930
- English publication date: 1964

The Defense (also known as The Luzhin Defense; Russian: Защита Лужина, romanized: Zashchita Luzhina) is the third novel written by Vladimir Nabokov after he had emigrated to Berlin. It was first published in Russian in 1930 and later in English in 1964.

== Publication ==
The novel appeared first under Nabokov's pen name V. Sirin in the Russian emigre quarterly Sovremennye zapiski and was thereafter published by the emigre publishing house Slovo as "Защита Лужина" (The Luzhin Defense) in Berlin. More than three decades later the novel was translated into English by Michael Scammell in collaboration with Nabokov and appeared in 1964. In the foreword to the English edition Nabokov states that he wrote The Defense in 1929 while he vacationed in Le Boulou ("hunting butterflies") and then finished it in Berlin. He links the events in the central chapters to moves as encountered in chess problems.

== Plot summary ==
The plot concerns the title character, Aleksandr Ivanovich Luzhin. As a boy, he is considered unattractive, withdrawn, and an object of ridicule by his classmates. One day, when a guest comes to his father's party, he is asked whether he knows how to play chess. This encounter serves as his motivation to pick up chess. He skips school and visits his aunt's house to learn the basics. He quickly becomes a great player, enrolling in local competitions and rising in rank as a chess player. His talent is prodigious and he attains the level of a grandmaster in less than ten years. For many years, he remains one of the top chess players in the world, but fails to become a world champion.

During one of the tournaments, at a resort, he meets a young girl, never named in the novel, whose interest he captures. They become romantically involved, and Luzhin eventually proposes to her.

Things turn for the worse when he is pitted against Turati, a grandmaster from Italy, in a competition to determine who would face the current world champion. Before and during the game, Luzhin has a mental breakdown, which climaxes when his carefully planned defense against Turati fails in the first moves, and the resulting game fails to produce a winner. When the game is suspended Luzhin wanders into the city in a state of complete detachment from reality.

He is returned home and brought to a rest home, where he eventually recovers. His doctor convinces Luzhin's fiancée that chess was the reason for his downfall, and all reminders of chess are removed from his environment.

Slowly however, chess begins to find its way back into his thoughts (aided by incidental occurrences, such as an old pocket chessboard found in a coat pocket, or an impractical chess game in a movie). Luzhin begins to see his life as a chess game, seeing repetitions of 'moves' that return his obsession with the game. He desperately tries to find the move that will defend him from losing his chess life-game, but feels the scenario growing closer and closer.

Eventually, after an encounter with his old chess mentor, Valentinov, Luzhin realizes that he must "abandon the game," as he puts it to his wife (who is desperately trying to communicate with him). He locks himself in the bathroom (his wife and several dinner guests banging on the door). He climbs out of a window, and it is implied he falls to his death, but the ending is deliberately vague. The last line of the (translated) novel reads: "The door was burst in. 'Aleksandr Ivanovich, Aleksandr Ivanovich,' roared several voices. But there was no Aleksandr Ivanovich."

== Major characters ==
Aleksandr Ivanovich Luzhin: The protagonist of the novel. As a child, he is misunderstood by his parents and mistreated by his peers, and is generally sullen in complexion and demeanor. He has no friends. As an adult, he is corpulent, socially inept, and absent-minded. He has a nervous breakdown during his match with the Italian grandmaster Turati.

Luzhin's wife: She marries Luzhin after much protest from her mother and father. She is initially drawn to the air of mystery that surrounds the chess master and feels compassion for his social ineptitude. She takes on a motherly role in her marriage with Luzhin, and makes it her occupation to amuse him and keep his mind off of his unhealthy obsession with chess. She remains nameless in the novel.

Ivan Luzhin: Aleksandr Luzhin's father. A writer of novels intended for young boys. As he puts off beginning a novel based on his young son's prodigiousness in chess and the viperous character of Valentinov, he dies.

Valentinov: A confident man with a competent understanding of chess (he creates problems but does not play) who manages Luzhin's career through childhood. He uses the young Luzhin for his own gain and without much regard for Luzhin's personal development. Valentinov returns Luzhin to his father once he is no longer marketable as a child prodigy.

Turati: The suave Italian grandmaster of chess. Luzhin has a nervous breakdown midway through the game with Turati.

== Comments ==
The character of Luzhin is based on Curt von Bardeleben, a chess master Nabokov knew personally. Bardeleben ended his life by jumping out of a window. Nabokov said of this novel: "Of all my Russian books, The Defense contains and diffuses the greatest 'warmth' – which may seem odd seeing how supremely abstract chess is supposed to be." He later described this novel as the "story of a chess player who was crushed by his genius".

The book was also influenced by the Soviet film Chess Fever (1925).

== Movie adaptation ==
The book was adapted to film in 2000, as The Luzhin Defence. It was directed by Marleen Gorris, and starred John Turturro as Luzhin.
