= Dmitri Nabokov =

American opera singer and translator

Dmitri Vladimirovich Nabokov (Russian: Дми́трий Влади́мирович Набо́ков; May 10, 1934 – February 22, 2012) was an American opera singer and translator. Born in Berlin, he was the only child of Russian parents: author Vladimir Nabokov and his wife Véra; they emigrated to the United States from France in 1940. He later was naturalized. In his later years, Nabokov translated many of his father's works into other languages, and served as the executor of his father's literary estate.

== Early life and education ==
Dmitri Nabokov was born on May 10, 1934, in Berlin. He was the only child of Vladimir Nabokov and Véra Slonim Nabokov. Due to Nazi Germany's growing political and social repression, and the likelihood that the regime might target the family (his mother was Jewish), the family fled to Paris in 1937. With the Germans advancing into France, they emigrated to New York City by ship in 1940. Subsequently, Nabokov was raised in the Boston area during the years that his father both taught at Wellesley College and served as curator of lepidoptery at Harvard University's Museum of Comparative Zoology. When his father took a teaching job at Cornell University, Dmitri lived with his parents in Ithaca, New York.

In 1951, Nabokov entered Harvard College, where he was a resident of Lowell House. Nabokov studied History and Literature. Although he scored high on the LSAT and was accepted to Harvard Law School (while still an undergraduate), Nabokov declined admission because he was searching for a vocation. Nabokov graduated cum laude in 1955. He studied singing (bass) for two years at the Longy School of Music. Nabokov joined the U.S. Army as an instructor in military Russian and as an assistant to a chaplain.

== Career ==
Nabokov translated many of his father's works, including novels, stories, plays, poems, lectures, and letters, into several languages. One of his first translations, from Russian to English, was Invitation to a Beheading, under his father's supervision. In 1986, Dmitri published his posthumous translation of a novella by his father that was previously unknown to the public. The Enchanter (Volshebnik), written in Russian in 1939, was deemed "a dead scrap" by his father and thought to have been destroyed. The novella has some similarities to Lolita. Consequently, it has been described as the Ur-Lolita ("The Original Lolita"), a precursor to Nabokov's best-known work, but Dmitri did not agree with this assessment.

Dmitri collaborated with his father on a translation of Mikhail Lermontov's novel, A Hero of Our Time.

In 1961, Nabokov made his operatic début by winning the Reggio Emilia International Opera Competition, basso division, singing the role of Colline in La bohème (this was also the début of his fellow cast member Luciano Pavarotti as Rodolfo; Pavarotti won the tenor competition). Among the highlights from his operatic career are performances at the Gran Teatre del Liceu with the soprano Montserrat Caballé and the tenor Giacomo Aragall.

In 1968, Nabokov was cast in the movie Una jena in cassaforte (A Hyena in a Safe), directed by Cesare Canevari. The film was shot at Villa Toeplitz, in Varese. The cast also included Maria Luisa Geisberger, Ben Salvador, Alex Morrison, Karina Kar, Cristina Gajoni, and Otto Tinard.

In Switzerland in 1980, Nabokov, also a semi-professional racecar driver, was driving a competition-model Ferrari 308 GTB when he crashed on the A9 motorway near Chexbres. He suffered third-degree burns over 40% of his body, and fractured his neck. Nabokov has said that he temporarily died: "[I am] enticed by a bright light at the far end of the classic tunnel, but restrain myself at the last instant when I think of those who care for me and of important things I must still do." The injuries suffered in the crash effectively ended his operatic career.

As executor of his father's literary estate, Nabokov wrestled for 30 years over whether to publish his father's final manuscript, The Original of Laura. It was published by Knopf on November 16, 2009.

In celebration of Vladimir Nabokov's centenary in 1999, Dmitri appeared as his father in Terry Quinn's Dear Bunny, Dear Volodya, a dramatic reading based on the personal letters between Nabokov and literary and social critic Edmund Wilson, whose words were read by William F. Buckley. Performances took place in New York City, Paris, Mainz, and Ithaca.

Dmitri Nabokov published his own writings under a pen name that he never revealed.

== Later life and death ==
Despite "an active, colorful love life", Dmitri was a lifelong bachelor and had no children.

In his later years, he lived in Palm Beach, Florida and Montreux, Switzerland. He died in Vevey, Switzerland on February 23, 2012.
