= Véra Nabokov =

Russian editor and translator (1902–1991)

- Вера Набокова
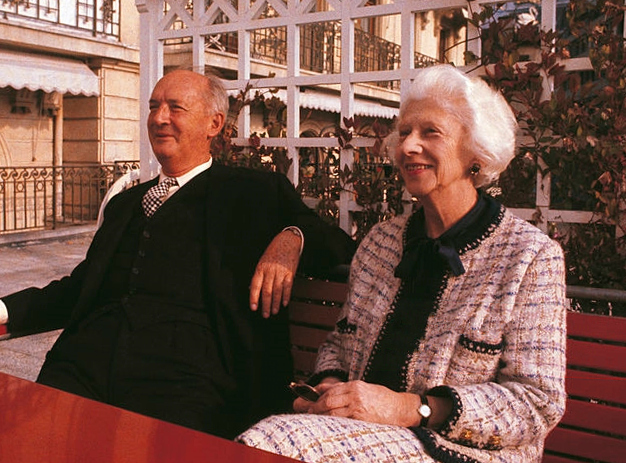
- Véra and Vladimir Nabokov, Montreux, 1969
- Born: Vera Yevseyevna Slonim; 5 January 1902; Saint Petersburg, Russia
- Died: 7 April 1991 (aged 89); Vevey, Switzerland
- Occupations: Editor; translator
- Spouse: Vladimir Nabokov (m. 1925; died 1977)
- Children: Dmitri Nabokov

Véra Nabokov (née Slonim; Russian: Вера Евсеевна Набокова, romanized: Vera Yevseyevna Nabokova; 5 January 1902 – 7 April 1991) was a Russian literary editor, translator, and typist. She was married to the Russian writer Vladimir Nabokov and was instrumental to his career as a creative partner and a source of inspiration for many of his works.

== Early life and immigration ==
Born Vera Yevseyevna Slonim in Saint Petersburg into a Jewish family, the second of three daughters born to Slava Borisovna (née Feigin) and Yevsey Lazarevich Slonim. Yevsey was a lawyer, and successful in the tile and timber businesses, among others. With the turmoil of World War I and the Russian Revolution, the family moved to Moscow, and after fleeing through Kiev, Odessa, Istanbul, and Sofia, arrived in Berlin, where they joined the large Russian émigré population.

== Marriage to Nabokov ==
In Berlin, Yevsey Slonim co-founded a publishing firm, Orbis, and Véra worked in the office. Vladimir Nabokov, who was considering translating Dostoevsky into English, met Véra's father at the office and they played chess. Véra admired Vladimir's poetry, which was well known through émigré publications, and went to his readings.

The details of the first meeting between Véra and Vladimir are uncertain; he maintained it was at a charity ball on 8 (or 9) May 1923, but she denied this story. Sometime after that date, the two had a long conversation overlooking a canal, at which Véra wore a mask and recited Vladimir's poetry. At the time, he was using the pen name "Vladimir Sirin" (Владимир Сирин).

Although it was then unusual for a Russian aristocrat to marry into a Jewish family, Nabokov had no issue with it. His father, Vladimir Dmitrievich Nabokov, was a prominent opponent of anti-semitism in Tsarist Russia and wrote articles deploring the Kishinev pogrom. Vladimir Dmitrievich was killed in 1922 in Berlin, during an assassination attempt on the life of politician Pavel Milyukov.

Vera and Vladimir were married on 15 April 1925. She ended her own budding career as a writer to support her husband as a critic, reader, and typist, and sustained the family through her work as a secretary and translator. Their son, Dmitri, was born 10 May 1934.

After moving to the United States in 1940, she learned to drive and chauffeured her husband on many field trips, notably in the Pacific Northwest, to hunt butterflies. To protect him she carried a handgun. Nabokov relied on her in his work and "would have been nowhere without her." During his lectures, she would sit at stage right while he spoke from a lectern at stage left. She was his inspiration, editor, and first reader; all his works are dedicated to her. Lolita was saved by her from the flames more than once.

== Return to Europe and death ==
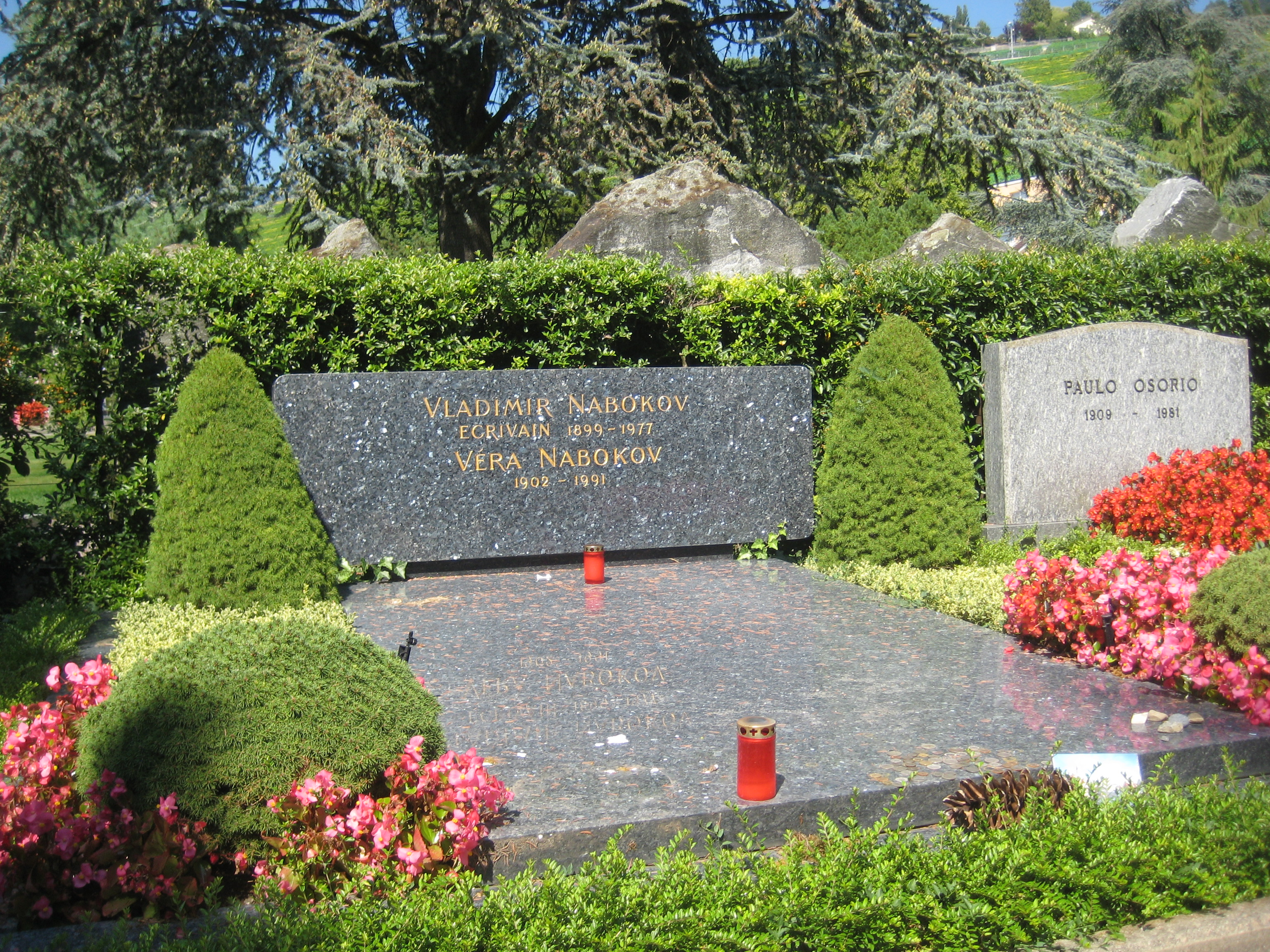
The grave of the Nabokovs at Cimetière de Clarens (Switzerland)

Upon the couple's return to Europe in 1960, she resided with her husband at the Montreux Palace Hotel where she continued to manage his affairs, and after his death in 1977, his estate. Upon his death, Vladimir had requested his final work, The Original of Laura, be burned, but neither Véra nor Dmitri could bring themselves to destroy the manuscript, and eventually it was published in 2009. In her late 80s, she translated Pale Fire into Russian.

She stayed at the Palace until 1990, and died the following year at Vevey. She was buried alongside her husband at the cemetery in Clarens. Dmitri, who died in 2012, is also buried there.

== See also ==
- Visiting Mrs Nabokov
