= Vladimir Nabokov bibliography =

This is a list of works by writer Vladimir Nabokov.

== Fiction ==
=== Novels and novellas ===
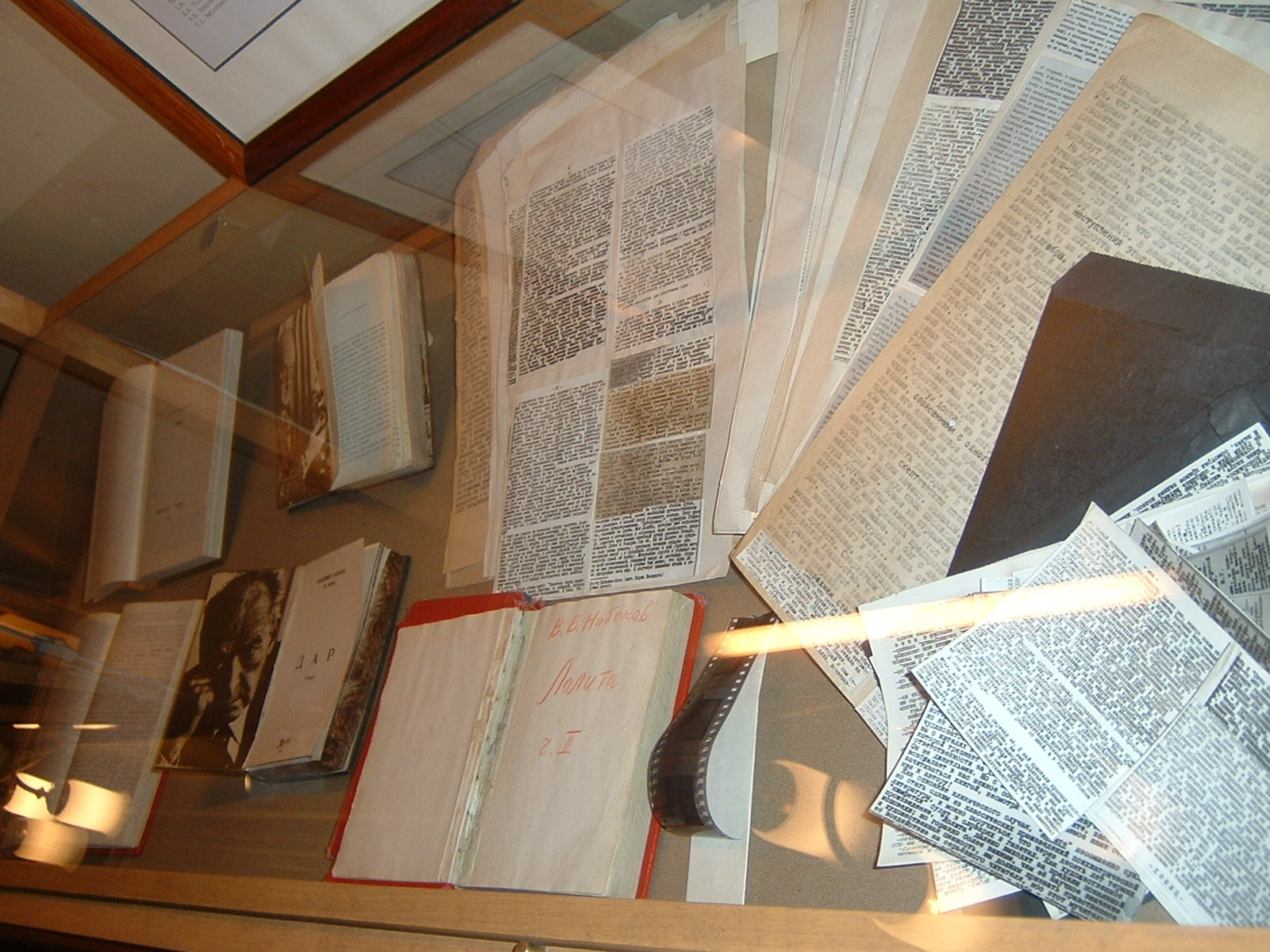
Samizdat copies of Nabokov's works on display at Nabokov House in Saint Petersburg.

==== Novels and novellas written in Russian ====
Nabokov was so unhappy with Winifred Ray's work on Camera Obscura (1935) — his first book to appear in English — that he supervised all subsequent English translations himself. Some he completed single-handedly but on most he worked with a collaborator, often his son Dmitri, who also undertook the posthumous translation of The Enchanter.

- (1926) Mashen'ka (Машенька); English translation: Mary (1970)
- (1928) Korol', dama, valet (Король, дама, валет); English translation: King, Queen, Knave (1968)
- (1930) Zashchita Luzhina (Защита Лужина); English translation: The Luzhin Defense or The Defense (1964) (also adapted to film, The Luzhin Defence, in 2000)
- (1930) Sogliadatay (Соглядатай (The Voyeur)), novella; first publication as a book 1938; English translation: The Eye (1965)
- (1932) Podvig (Подвиг (Heroic Deed)); English translation: Glory (1971)
- (1933) Kamera obskura (Камера обскура); English translations: Winifred Ray's translation (Camera Obscura, 1935) was quickly superseded by Nabokov's own translation (Laughter in the Dark, 1938)
- (1934) Otchayanie (Отчаяние); English translations: translated twice by Nabokov as Despair, in 1937 and again in 1966 (an abridged magazine version of the latter appeared in 1965)
- (1936) Priglashenie na kazn' (Приглашение на казнь (Invitation to an execution)); English translation: Invitation to a Beheading (1959)
- (1938) Dar (Дар); English translation: The Gift (1963)
- (Unpublished novella, written in 1939) Volshebnik (Волшебник); English translation: The Enchanter (1985)

==== Novels written in English ====
- (1941) The Real Life of Sebastian Knight
- (1947) Bend Sinister
- (1955) Lolita (translated by Nabokov into Russian, 1965)
- (1957) Pnin
- (1962) Pale Fire
- (1969) Ada or Ardor: A Family Chronicle
- (1972) Transparent Things
- (1974) Look at the Harlequins!
- (2009) The Original of Laura (fragmentary, written during the mid-1970s and published posthumously)

=== Short story collections ===
- (1930) Vozvrashchenie Chorba ("The Return of Chorb") (fifteen short stories and twenty-four poems, in Russian, by "V. Sirin")
- (1938) Sogliadatai ("The Eye") (thirteen short stories, in Russian, by "V. Sirin")
- (1947) Nine Stories
- (1956) Vesna v Fial'te i drugie rasskazy ("Spring in Fialta and other stories")
- (1958) Nabokov's Dozen: A Collection of Thirteen Stories (also reprinted as Spring in Fialta and First Love and Other Stories)
- (1966) Nabokov's Quartet
- (1968) Nabokov's Congeries (reprinted as The Portable Nabokov (1971))
- (1973) A Russian Beauty and Other Stories
- (1975) Tyrants Destroyed and Other Stories
- (1976) Details of a Sunset and Other Stories
- (1995) The Stories of Vladimir Nabokov (alternative title The Collected Stories; complete collection of all short stories)

=== Short stories ===
- (c. 1921) "Natasha". The New Yorker, June 9 & 16, 2008 (incorporated into the 17th and later printings of the paperback edition of The Stories of Vladimir Nabokov)
- (1923-01-07) "The Word". The New Yorker, December 26, 2005 (incorporated into the 15th and later printings of the paperback edition of The Stories of Vladimir Nabokov)
- (1926, Summer) "The Man Stopped". Harper's Magazine, March 1, 2015
- (1948) "Colette". The New Yorker, July 31, 1948 This story eventually found its way into Nabokov’s autobiography, Speak, Memory.
- (1955) "Pnin gives a party". The New Yorker, November 12, 1955

=== Drama ===
- (1924) The Tragedy of Mister Morn (2012): English translation of a Russian-language play written 1923–24, publicly read 1924, published in a journal 1997, independently published 2008
- (1938) Izobretenie val'sa (The Waltz Invention); English translation The Waltz Invention: A Play in Three Acts (1966)
- (1974) Lolita: A Screenplay (despite the credits given in the earlier film version, this was not used)
- (1984) The Man from the USSR and Other Plays

=== Poetry ===
- (1916) Stikhi ("Poems"). Sixty-eight poems in Russian.
- (1918) Al'manakh: Dva puti (An Almanac: Two Paths"). Twelve poems by Nabokov and eight by Andrei Balashov, in Russian.
- (1922) Grozd ("The Cluster"). Thirty-six poems in Russian, by "V. Sirin".
- (1923) Gornii put' ("The Empyrean Path"). One hundred and twenty-eight poems in Russian, by "Vl. Sirin".
- (1929) Vozvrashchenie Chorba ("The Return of Chorb"). Fifteen short stories and twenty-four poems, in Russian, by "V. Sirin".
- (1952) Stikhotvoreniia 1929–1951 ("Poems 1929–1951") Fifteen poems in Russian.
- (1959) Poems. The contents were later incorporated within Poems and Problems.
- (1969) Poems and Problems (a collection of poetry and chess problems). The contents were later incorporated within Selected Poems.
- (1979) Stikhi ("Poems"). Two hundred and twenty-two poems in Russian.
- (2012) Selected Poems

=== Translations ===
==== From French into Russian ====
- (1922) Nikolka Persik Translation of Romain Rolland's novel Colas Breugnon

==== From English into Russian ====
- (1923) Alice's Adventures in Wonderland (as Аня в стране чудес)

==== From Russian into English ====
- (1944) Three Russian Poets: Selections from Pushkin, Lermontov, and Tyutchev. Expanded British edition: Pushkin, Lermontov, Tyutchev: Poems (1947).
- (1958) A Hero of Our Time, by Mikhail Lermontov. Collaboration with his son Dmitri.
- (1960) The Song of Igor's Campaign: An Epic of the Twelfth Century
- (1964) Eugene Onegin, by Aleksandr Pushkin, in prose. Includes "Notes on Prosody". Revised edition (1975).
- (2008) Verses and Versions: Three Centuries of Russian Poetry, edited by Brian Boyd and Stanislav Shvabrin. Includes materials previously published in Three Russian Poets (1945) and Pushkin, Lermontov, Tyutchev (1947) as well as unpublished materials.

== Nonfiction ==
=== Criticism ===
- (1944) Nikolai Gogol
- (1963) Notes on Prosody (Later appeared within Eugene Onegin.)
- (1980) Lectures on Literature
- (1980) Lectures on Ulysses. Facsimiles of Nabokov's notes.
- (1981) Lectures on Russian Literature
- (1983) Lectures on Don Quixote

=== Autobiographical and other ===
- (1949) "Curtain-Raiser". The New Yorker 24/45 (1 January 1949): 18–21.
- (1951) Conclusive Evidence: A Memoir. First version of Nabokov's autobiography. (British edition titled Speak, Memory: A Memoir.)
- (1954) Drugie berega (Другие берега, "Other Shores"). Revised version of the autobiography.
- (1967) Speak, Memory: An Autobiography Revisited. Final revised and extended edition of Conclusive Evidence. It includes information on his work as a lepidopterist.
- (1973) Strong Opinions. Interviews, reviews, letters to editors.
- (1979) The Nabokov–Wilson Letters. Letters between Nabokov and Edmund Wilson.
- (1984) Perepiska s sestroi (Переписка с сестрой (Correspondence with the Sister)). Correspondence between Nabokov and Helene Sikorski; also includes some letters to his brother Kirill.
- (1987) Carrousel. Three long-forgotten short texts that had recently been rediscovered.
- (1989) Selected Letters
- (2001) Dear Bunny, Dear Volodya: The Nabokov–Wilson Letters, 1940–1971. A revised and augmented edition of The Nabokov–Wilson Letters.
- (2014) Letters to Véra. Nabokov's letters to Véra Slonim, beginning in 1921 and extending through their marriage.
- (2017) Conversations with Vladimir Nabokov. Collection of interviews.
- (2019) Think, Write, Speak: Uncollected Essays, Reviews, Interviews and Letters to the Editor. Previously uncollected Russian and English prose and interviews.

=== Lepidopteral ===
- (2000) Nabokov's Butterflies, collected works on butterflies. ISBN 0-8070-8540-5

== Collected works ==
- Boyd, Brian, ed. Vladimir Nabokov, Novels and Memoirs 1941–1951 (Library of America, 1996) ISBN 978-1-883011-18-5
- Boyd, Brian, ed. Vladimir Nabokov, Novels 1955–1962 (Library of America, 1996) ISBN 978-1-883011-19-2
- Boyd, Brian, ed. Vladimir Nabokov, Novels 1969–1974 (Library of America, 1996) ISBN 978-1-883011-20-8
