= The Stories of Vladimir Nabokov =

Posthumous book of all Nabokov's stories

- First edition
- Author: Vladimir Nabokov
- Translator: Dmitri Nabokov et al.
- Language: English
- Publisher: Alfred A. Knopf
- Publication date: October 24, 1995
- Publication place: United States
- Media type: Print
- Pages: 659
- ISBN: 9780394586151
- OCLC: 32780442
- Dewey Decimal: 813.54—dc20 95-23466
- LC Class: PS3527.A15A6 1995

The Stories of Vladimir Nabokov (in some British editions, The Collected Stories) is a posthumous collection of short stories by the Russian-American author Vladimir Nabokov. Most of the stories collected in the book were translated from Russian into English by Nabokov, his wife, Vera Nabokov, and their son, Dmitri Nabokov. A further sixteen stories not previously published in English were translated by Vera and later Dmitri after Nabokov's death. The book collects every known short story written by Nabokov with the exception of "The Enchanter", translated by Dmitri published as a stand-alone novella in 1987, and "The Man Stopped," which was discovered and translated into English in 2015, after Dmitri's death. The collection was first published in America by Alfred A. Knopf in 1995.

In 1958, Nabokov published the story collection Nabokov's Dozen, which included thirteen short stories. Towards the end of his life, he collected the rest of his short fiction in three similar collections: A Russian Beauty and Other Stories (1973), Tyrants Destroyed and Other Stories (1975), and Details of a Sunset and Other Stories (1976). Nabokov had planned to publish a fifth collection of thirteen stories, but he died before he could translate them. After his death, his wife and son began translating the remaining thirteen, and all sixty-five stories were eventually collected in 1995. The stories are ordered in as close to chronological order as the Nabokov family was able to piece together.

Three additional stories were discovered and translated after the first printing of this collection. They were incorporated in later printings of the U.S. paperback edition and in later printings of the hardback and paperback British editions of this work. The eighth part of the story "The Potato Elf" was accidentally omitted from the first five printings of the hardcover edition of this book.

== List of stories ==
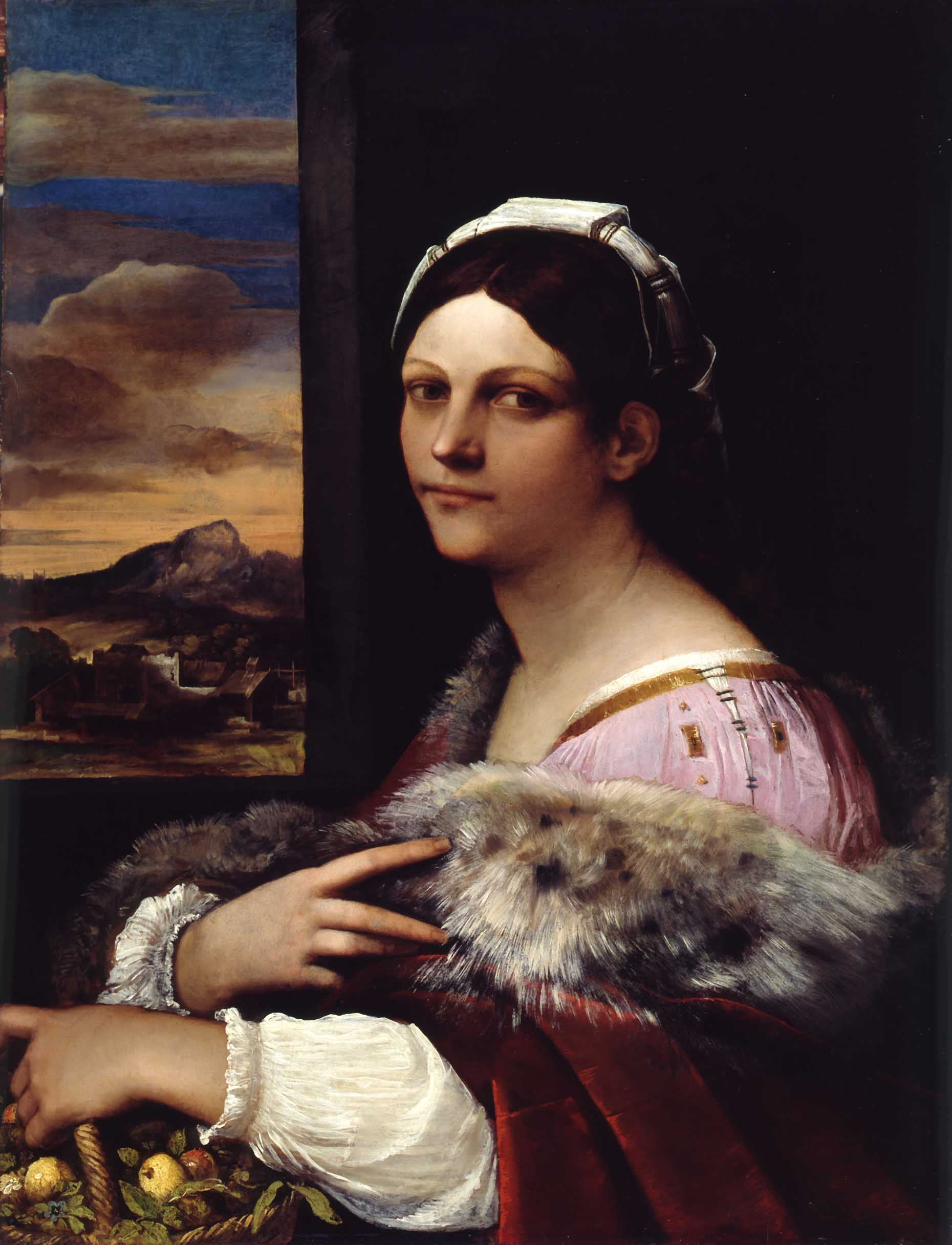
The subject of Sebastiano del Piombo's Dorotea (1513) is the "Venetian" of Nabokov's "La Veneziana". The Kaiser-Friedrich Museum of Berlin houses the painting.

English title	Original language	Original publication	Original English collection
"The Wood-Sprite"	Russian	Rul' (1921)	-
"Russian Spoken Here"	Russian	(composed 1923)	-
"Sounds"	Russian	The New Yorker (1995; composed 1923)	-
"Wingstroke"	Russian	Russkoye Ekho (1924)	-
"Gods"	Russian	(composed 1923)	-
"A Matter of Chance"	Russian	Segodnya (1924)	Tyrants Destroyed and Other Stories (1974)
"The Seaport"	Russian	Rul' (1924)	-
"Revenge"	Russian	Russkoye Ekho (1924)	-
"Beneficence"	Russian	Rul' (1924)	-
"Details of a Sunset"	Russian	Segodnya (1924)	Details of a Sunset and Other Stories (1976)
"The Thunderstorm"	Russian	Rul' (1924)	Details of a Sunset and Other Stories (1976)
"La Veneziana"	Russian	(composed 1924)	-
"Bachmann"	Russian	Rul' (1924)	Tyrants Destroyed and Other Stories (1974)
"The Dragon"	Russian	(composed 1924)	-
"Christmas"	Russian	Rul' (1925)	Details of a Sunset and Other Stories (1976)
"A Letter That Never Reached Russia"	Russian	Rul' (1925)	Details of a Sunset and Other Stories (1976)
"The Fight"	Russian	Rul' (1925)	-
"The Return of Chorb"	Russian	Rul' (1925)	Details of a Sunset and Other Stories (1976)
"A Guide to Berlin"	Russian	Rul' (1925)	Details of a Sunset and Other Stories (1976)
"A Nursery Tale"	Russian	Rul' (1926)	Tyrants Destroyed and Other Stories (1974)
"Terror"	Russian	Sovremennya Zapiski (1927)	Tyrants Destroyed and Other Stories (1974)
"Razor"	Russian	Rul' (1926)	-
"The Passenger"	Russian	Rul' (1927)	Details of a Sunset and Other Stories (1976)
"The Doorbell"	Russian	Rul' (1927)	Details of a Sunset and Other Stories (1976)
"An Affair of Honor"	Russian	Rul' (1927)	A Russian Beauty and Other Stories (1973)
"The Christmas Story"	Russian	Rul' (1928)	-
"The Potato Elf"	Russian	Rul' (1929)	A Russian Beauty and Other Stories (1973)
"The Aurelian"	Russian	Sovremennya Zapiski (1931)	Nabokov's Dozen (1958)
"A Dashing Fellow"	Russian	Segodnya (early 1930s)	A Russian Beauty and Other Stories (1973)
"A Bad Day"	Russian	Poslednie Novosti (1931)	Details of a Sunset and Other Stories (1976)
"The Visit to the Museum"	Russian	Sovremennya Zapiski (1939)	A Russian Beauty and Other Stories (1973)
"A Busy Man"	Russian	Poslednie Novosti (1931)	Details of a Sunset and Other Stories (1976)
"Terra Incognita"	Russian	Poslednie Novosti (1931)	A Russian Beauty and Other Stories (1973)
"The Reunion"	Russian	Poslednie Novosti (1932)	Details of a Sunset and Other Stories (1976)
"Lips to Lips"	Russian	Vesna v Fialte (1956)	A Russian Beauty and Other Stories (1973)
"Orache"	Russian	Poslednie Novosti (1932)	Details of a Sunset and Other Stories (1976)
"Music"	Russian	Poslednie Novosti (1932)	Tyrants Destroyed and Other Stories (1974)
"Perfection"	Russian	Poslednie Novosti (1932)	Tyrants Destroyed and Other Stories (1974)
"The Admiralty Spire"	Russian	Poslednie Novosti (1933)	Tyrants Destroyed and Other Stories (1974)
"The Leonardo"	Russian	Poslednie Novosti (1933)	A Russian Beauty and Other Stories (1973)
"In Memory of L. I. Shigaev"	Russian	Poslednie Novosti (1934)	Tyrants Destroyed and Other Stories (1974)
"The Circle"	Russian	Poslednie Novosti (presumed; 1936)	A Russian Beauty and Other Stories (1973)
"A Russian Beauty"	Russian	Poslednie Novosti (1934)	A Russian Beauty and Other Stories (1973)
"Breaking the News"	Russian	unknown, circa 1935	A Russian Beauty and Other Stories (1973)
"Torpid Smoke"	Russian	Poslednie Novosti (1935)	A Russian Beauty and Other Stories (1973)
"Recruiting"	Russian	Poslednie Novosti (1935)	Tyrants Destroyed and Other Stories (1974)
"A Slice of Life"	Russian	Poslednie Novosti (1935)	Details of a Sunset and Other Stories (1976)
"Spring in Fialta"	Russian	Sovremennya Zapiski (1937)	Nabokov's Dozen (1958)
"Cloud, Castle, Lake"	Russian	Sovremennya Zapiski (1938)	Nabokov's Dozen (1958)
"Tyrants Destroyed"	Russian	Russkiya Zapiski (1938)	Tyrants Destroyed and Other Stories (1974)
"Lik"	Russian	Russkiya Zapiski (1939)	Tyrants Destroyed and Other Stories (1974)
"Vasiliy Shishkov"	Russian	Russkiya Zapiski (1939)	Tyrants Destroyed and Other Stories (1974)
"Ultima Thule"	Russian	Novyy Zhurnal (1942)	A Russian Beauty and Other Stories (1973)
"Solus Rex"	Russian	Sovremennya Zapiski (1940)	A Russian Beauty and Other Stories (1973)
"Mademoiselle O"	French	Mesures (1936)	Nabokov's Dozen (1958)
"The Assistant Producer"	English	Atlantic Monthly	Nabokov's Dozen (1958)
"That in Aleppo Once…"	English	Atlantic Monthly	Nabokov's Dozen (1958)
"A Forgotten Poet"	English	Atlantic Monthly	Nabokov's Dozen (1958)
"Time and Ebb"	English	Atlantic Monthly	Nabokov's Dozen (1958)
"Conversation Piece, 1945"	English	The New Yorker (1945)	Nabokov's Dozen (1958)
"Signs and Symbols"	English	The New Yorker (1948)	Nabokov's Dozen (1958)
"First Love"	English	The New Yorker (1948)	Nabokov's Dozen (1958)
"Scenes from the Life of a Double Monster"	English	The Reporter	Nabokov's Dozen (1958)
"The Vane Sisters"	English	Hudson Review (1959)	Tyrants Destroyed and Other Stories (1974)
"Lance"	English	The New Yorker (1952)	Nabokov's Dozen (1958)
"Easter Rain"	Russian	Russkoe Ekho (1925)	11th U.S. paperback printing (2002)
"The Word"	Russian	Rul' (1923)	15th U.S. paperback printing (2006)
"Natasha"	Russian	The New Yorker (2008; composed 1924)	17th U.S. paperback printing (2008)

== Editions ==
- Alfred Knopf, New York, 1995 (hardback) ISBN 0-394-58615-8
- Vintage, New York, 1996 (paperback) ISBN 0-679-72997-6
- Weidenfeld & Nicolson, London, 1996 (hardback) ISBN 0-297-81722-1
- Penguin, London, 1997 (paperback) ISBN 0-14-118051-X
- Penguin, London, 1999 (paperback) ISBN 0-14-018975-0
- Penguin, London, 2001 (paperback) ISBN 0-14-118345-4
