= Nabokov's Congeries =

Book by Vladimir Nabokov

- First edition
- Author: Vladimir Nabokov
- Language: English
- Publisher: Viking Press
- Publication date: 1968
- Media type: Print

Nabokov's Congeries was a collection of work by Vladimir Nabokov published in 1968 and reprinted in 1971 as The Portable Nabokov. It was edited by Page Stegner. Because Nabokov supervised its production less than a decade before he died, it is useful in attempting to identify which works Nabokov considered to be his best, especially among his short stories.

The text of "The Assistant Producer" contained in Nabokov's Congeries omits the story's final two paragraphs, which had apparently been inadvertently dropped from all English-language editions of the story subsequent to the first. This was explained by the author's son in his introduction to the posthumously published collection The Stories of Vladimir Nabokov (1995), in which the story appears with its final paragraphs restored.

== Contents ==
- Editor's Introduction by Page Stegner
- A Bibliographical Note
- Vladimir Nabokov: A Chronology

The Artist Himself

- From Speak, Memory: An Autobiography Revisited

Eleven Stories

- "Terra Incognita"
- "Cloud, Castle, Lake" (Облако, озеро, башня)
- "The Visit to the Museum" (Посещение музея)
- "Spring in Fialta" (Весна в Фиальте)
- "That in Aleppo Once..."
- "The Assistant Producer"
- "Signs and Symbols"
- "First Love"
- "Lance"
- "The Vane Sisters"
- "Scenes from the Life of a Double Monster"

Essays and Criticism

- On a Book Entitled Lolita
- Introduction to Bend Sinister
- Foreword to Mihail Lermontov's A Hero of Our Time
- From Nikolai Gogol: The Government Specter
- From the Commentary to Eugene Onegin: On Romanticism; The Art of the Duel
- From Eugene Onegin: A Sample Translation from Chapter One, Stanzas I-VIII
- Reply to My Critics

A Novel and Three Excerpts

- Pnin complete
- From Despair
- From Invitation to a Beheading
- From The Gift

Poems

- The Refrigerator Awakes
- A Literary Dinner
- A Discovery
- An Evening of Russian Poetry
- Restoration
- Lines Written in Oregon
- Ode to a Model
- On Translating Eugene Onegin
- Rain
- The Ballad of Longwood Glen
