= Nabokov's Quartet =

First edition

Nabokov's Quartet is a collection of four of Vladimir Nabokov's short stories. The collection was first published by Phaedra, New York in 1966. It contains the following short stories:

- "An Affair of Honor"
- "Lik"
- "The Vane Sisters"
- "The Visit to the Museum"

"An Affair of Honor" and "The Visit to the Museum" were later reprinted in A Russian Beauty and Other Stories (1973), and "Lik" and "The Vane Sisters" were reprinted in Tyrants Destroyed and Other Stories (1975). "The Vane Sisters" and "The Visit to the Museum" were also included in Nabokov's Congeries (1968), and all four stories were published again posthumously within The Stories of Vladimir Nabokov (1995).
