= Spring in Fialta and other stories =

First edition

Spring in Fialta and other stories (Весна в Фиальте и другие рассказы; "Vesna v Fialʹte i drugie rasskazy") is a collection of short stories by the Russian author Vladimir Nabokov. The collection contains 14 short stories written between 1931 and 1940. It was originally planned to be published in 1939 in Paris; however, due to the approach of World War II, it became an abandoned project.

The collection was first published in Russian in 1956 by the Chekhov Publishing House in New York.

== Contents ==
- Весна в Фиальте (Vesna v Fial'te); English translation: Spring in Fialta (1936)
- Круг (Krug); English translation: The Circle (1934)
- Королек (Korolek); English translation: The Leonardo (1939)
- Тяжолый дым (Tyazhyolyy dym); English translation: Torpid Smoke (1935)
- Памяти Л.И. Шигаева (Pamyati L.I. Shigaeva); English translation: In the Memory of L.I. Shigaev (1934)
- Посещение музея (Poseshchenie muzeya); English translation: The Visit to the Museum (1931)
- Набор (Nabor); English translation: Recruiting (1935)
- Лик (Lik); English translation: Lik (1939)
- Истребление тиранов (Istreblenie tiranov); English translation: Tyrants Destroyed (1938)
- Василий Шишков (Vasiliy Shishkov); English translation: Vasiliy Shishkov (1939)
- Адмиралтейская игла (Admiralteyskaya igla); English translation: The Admiralty Spire (1933)
- Облако, озеро, башня (Oblako, ozero, bashnya); English translation: Cloud, Castle, Lake (1937)
- Уста к устам (Usta k ustam); English translation: Lips to Lips (1932)
- Ultima Thule (1940)
