= The Aurelian =

Short story by Vladimir Nabokov

- Short story by Vladimir Nabokov
- Original title: Pil'gram
- Translator: Vladimir Nabokov and Peter Pertzov

Publication
- Publication date: 1930
- Published in English: 1941

"The Aurelian" is a short story first written in Russian as Pil'gram by Vladimir Nabokov during his exile in Berlin in 1930. After translation by Nabokov and Peter Pertzov, it was published in English in The Atlantic Monthly in 1941. The Aurelian is included in Nine Stories and Nabokov's Dozen.

== Plot summary ==
The aurelian is Paul Pilgram, an entomologist and butterfly dealer who has never left his native Berlin. His life is empty and dreary, his business is dismal, and his marriage is perfunctory. His dream has been to venture out on a collecting trip abroad, but lack of resources or interfering circumstances have never allowed this to happen. He imagines collecting butterflies in places such as Digne in France, Ragusa in Dalmatia, Sarepta in Russia, or Abisko in Lapland, catching them in the tropics, or following the lead of Father Dejean (a French missionary who worked in East Tibet). At last, by cheating a customer, he makes enough money to follow his dream, and prepares to abandon his wife and his business. As he departs, however, he suffers a second and fatal stroke. The narrator assures the reader that Pilgram has achieved a state of happiness in which he is visiting all the places he ever dreamt of and seeing “all the glorious bugs he had longed to see”.

== Comments ==
While many of Nabokov’s writings refer to butterflies, they achieve their strongest literary treatment in this short story, and in Speak, Memory, The Gift, and Ada. In this case, Pilgram is a dreamer and lives in his inner world, and is eventually overwhelmed by his obsession. Pilgram’s journey takes him from his pupa-like condition to a golden, "aurelian" threshold before he enters into a different state as he undergoes his metamorphosis. His death represents an example of Nabokov's theme of potustoronnost (transcendence, or reaching toward another world).
