= Nine Stories =

Nine Stories may refer to:

- Nine Stories (Nabokov), a collection of stories by Russian writer Vladimir Nabokov, released in 1947
- Nine Stories (Salinger), a collection of short stories by American writer J. D. Salinger, released in 1953
- Nine Stories, an American band formed by singer-songwriter Lisa Loeb
