= Nabokov's Dozen =

1958 collection of short stories by Vladimir Nabokov

- First edition (publ. Doubleday)
- Author: Vladimir Nabokov
- Language: English
- Publisher: Doubleday
- Publication date: 1958
- LC Class: PZ3.N121 Nab

Nabokov's Dozen is a 1958 collection of 13 short stories by Vladimir Nabokov previously published in American magazines. Nine of them also previously appeared in Nine Stories.

All were later reprinted within The Stories of Vladimir Nabokov.

Two stories, First Love (as Colette) and Mademoiselle O are also included in Nabokov's Speak, Memory.

== Contents ==
- "Spring in Fialta"
- "A Forgotten Poet"
- "First Love"
- "Signs and Symbols"
- "The Assistant Producer"
- "The Aurelian"
- "Cloud, Castle, Lake"
- "Conversation Piece, 1945"
- "That in Aleppo Once..."
- "Time and Ebb"
- "Scenes from the Life of a Double Monster"
- "Mademoiselle O"
- "Lance"
