= A Guide to Berlin =

A Guide to Berlin may refer to:

- "A Guide to Berlin" (short story), a 1925 short story by Vladimir Nabokov
- A Guide to Berlin (novel), a 2015 novel by Gail Jones
