= Nine Stories (Nabokov) =

1947 short story collection by Vladimir Nabokov

- First edition
- Author: Vladimir Nabokov
- Language: English
- Publisher: New Directions
- Publication date: 1947

Nine Stories is an English-language collection of short stories written in Russian, French, and English by Vladimir Nabokov. It was published in December 1947 by New Directions in New York City, as the second issue of a serial, Direction.

The nine stories are:

- "The Aurelian" (a translation by Nabokov and Peter Pertzov of "Pil'gram")
- "Cloud, Castle, Lake" (a translation by Nabokov and Peter Pertzov of "Oblako, ozero, bashnia")
- "Spring in Fialta" (a translation by Nabokov and Peter Pertzov of "Vesna v Fialte")
- "Mademoiselle O" (a translation by VN with Hilda Ward from the French)
- "A Forgotten Poet"
- "The Assistant Producer"
- "That in Aleppo Once..."
- "Time and Ebb"
- "Double Talk" (retitled "Conversation Piece 1945" in Nabokov's Dozen and later)

No further edition of the book was ever published; all nine stories subsequently reappeared in Nabokov's Dozen, and much later in The Stories of Vladimir Nabokov.
