= Terra Incognita (short story) =

1931 short story by Vladimir Nabokov

"Terra Incognita" is a short story written in Russian by Vladimir Nabokov that was first published in the émigré journal Posledniya Novosti in Paris in 1931. Translated by the author and his son, the story was published in English in The New Yorker in May 1963 and later added to A Russian Beauty and Other Stories.

== Plot summary ==
Vallière (who is also the narrator), his friend Gregson, and Cook - "reminiscent of a Shakespearean clown" - are escaping from Zonraki, trying to cross the yet unknown country to reach the Gurano Hills. The mission is ill-fated. Vallière is sick and febrile. Cook takes off with the Badonian porters, the supplies, and the collections. Gregson and Vallière decide to move on, but are soon joined again by the contrite Cook who apparently was left behind by the Badonians. The narrator is experiencing hallucinations as the journey winds down to its end. He sees at times in "ambiguous transparency" a wardrobe, a ceiling, wallpaper, an armchair, a tumbler with a teaspoon, a pillow, but these images on closer inspection dissolve into the surroundings of the expedition. Gregson and Cook start to quarrel, and end up killing each other. The narrator is alone, his reality is the tropical world with the two corpses; he is getting weaker, fading away. "As a last motion" he tries to write something down, but the notebook has slipped. Groping along the blanket, he cannot find it.

== Analysis ==
Nabokov who would later build more elaborate fantasy worlds with Zembla and Zoolandia takes the reader into the tropical hell of Badonia located between the mysterious land of Zonraki and the elusive Gurano Hills, where the fragrance of Vallieria mirifica meets the smell of ipecacduanha (the active ingredient in ipecac, an emetic). Valliere seems to die at the end of the doomed journey, but remains present as an albeit unreliable narrator. The accoutrements of a room of a sick person break from time to time into the story, and may at the very end - in the form of the blanket - take over suggesting the tropical episode to be the hallucination of a febrile mind. Alternatively the tropical experience may be the real one, and the sickbed interjections just the imaginations of a fading mind. The two worlds are juxtaposed and the reader is challenged on how to perceive reality.

"Terra Incognita", as well as the novels The Eye and Despair, are part of a series that explore subjective reality, leading to one of Nabokov's most successful novels, Invitation to a Beheading.

It imitates H. G. Wells' story The Remarkable Case of Davidson's Eyes (a.k.a. The Story of Davidson's Eyes) (1895).
