= Bachmann (short story) =

"Bachmann" is a short story written in Russian by Vladimir Nabokov under his pen name, Vladimir Sirin, in Berlin in 1924. The story details a three-year love affair between the titular Bachmann, a celebrated pianist, and Mme. Perov, a married woman.

== Background ==
"Bachmann" was published in Rul, a Russian émigré paper founded by his father, Vladimir Dmitrievich Nabokov. It also appeared in the German newspaper, Vossische Zeitung.

The story was later included in a number of short story collections including, Vozvrashchenie Chorba, Tyrants Destroyed and Other Stories (1975), and The Stories of Vladimir Nabokov (1995). An English adaptation of the book was later produced by Nabokov and his son Dmitri Nabokov.

== Plot summary ==
The story has an outer narrator who receives the story by Sack, the inner narrator. Sack is the impresario of Bachmann, but he is callous, and does not care for him. The core story deals with the love relationship between Mme. Perov and Bachmann. Bachmann is an awkward and eccentric pianist and composer to whom she is introduced at a party where she (like the reader) first mistakes Sack for Bachmann. Sack speaks disparagingly of B, who has "no brains". Sack has to track him down frequently as he being an alcoholic tends to disappear before his performances. Mme. Perov becomes a necessary and enhancing facilitator for the musical genius; he always made sure that she was sitting in the first row when he was performing. One night, when she was sick and absent, Bachmann refused to play and insulted the audience (Sack complained that he was showing them "the fig - instead of the fugue"). Sack dragged her out of her bed to the theatre, but Bachmann had left already. Sack made her look for Bachmann in a cold and rainy night, and when she finally returned to the hotel, she found Bachmann in the room. The outer narrator describes their togetherness: "I think that these two, the deranged musician and the dying woman, that night found words the greatest poets never dreamed of". She died the next day. Bachmann disappeared after the funeral and became insane. Sack saw him later in a deplorable state and avoided him.

== Comments ==
The complex construction of the story shows a tension between the unfeeling and callous inner narrator who may well carry some responsibility for Mme Perov's death and Bachmann's madness, and the more sympathetic outer narrator who shows two unique individuals who find inner fulfillment in their relationship and transform themselves. The outer narrator has no direct involvement in the events but knows more than what Sack tells him. The portrait of the artist as a unique and vulnerable person who does not fit in and is eccentric and close to madness is later picked up in the figure of Luzhin in his novel The Defense. A reference to the famous contemporary pianist Pachmann is present in the name, but also in the early recording ("in wax") of the performances, and the use of gestures towards the audience. The description of the female character as a stabilizing and uplifting factor for the genius was written shortly after Nabokov met his future wife who in a way had a similar enhancing effect upon Nabokov's life. Véra, too, was always sitting in the front row when he was lecturing.
