= Mademoiselle O =

Short story by Vladimir Nabokov

"Mademoiselle O" is a memoir by Vladimir Nabokov about his eccentric Swiss-French governess.

== Publication history ==
It was first written and published in French in Mesures (vol. 2, no. 2, 1936) and subsequently in English (translated by Nabokov and Hilda Ward) in The Atlantic Monthly (January 1943).

It was first anthologized in Nine Stories (1947) and was later reproduced in Nabokov's Dozen (1958) and The Stories of Vladimir Nabokov.

It became a chapter of Conclusive Evidence (1951, also titled Speak, Memory) and subsequently of Drugie Berega (1954, translated into Russian by the author) and Speak, Memory: An Autobiography Revisited (1966).
