= Despair (novel) =

1934 novel by Vladimir Nabokov

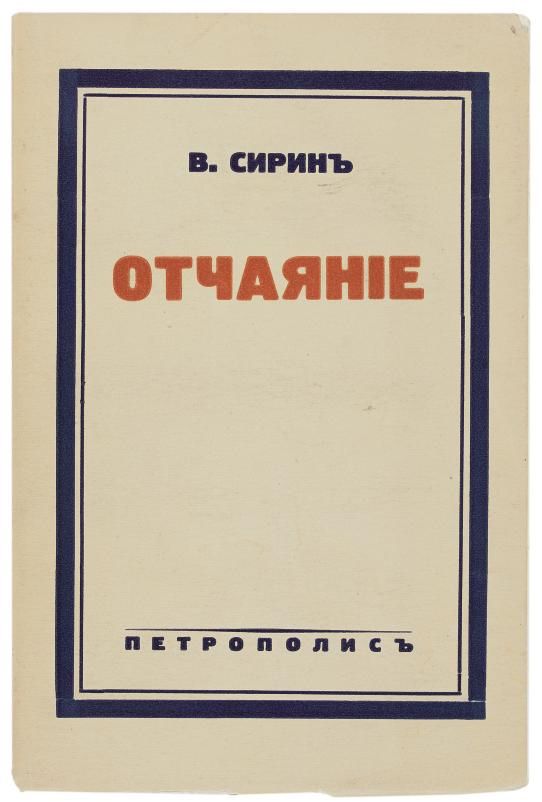
- First edition
- Author: Vladimir Nabokov
- Original title: Отчаяние
- Translator: Vladimir Nabokov
- Language: Russian
- Publisher: Sovremennye Zapiski Publishing House; John Long Ltd. (London )(first English-language edition); Putnam (2nd English version)
- Publication date: 1934
- Publication place: Germany
- English publication date: 1937 (revised by the author in 1965)
- Media type: Print

Despair (Russian: Отчаяние, or Otchayanie) is the seventh novel by Vladimir Nabokov, originally published in Russian, serially in the politicized literary journal Sovremennye zapiski during 1934. It was then published as a book in 1936, and translated to English by the author in 1937. Most copies of the 1937 English edition were destroyed by German bombs during World War II; only a few copies remain. Nabokov published a second English translation in 1965; this is now the only English translation in print.

== Plot summary ==
The narrator and protagonist of the story, Hermann Karlovich, a Russian of German descent and owner of a chocolate factory, meets a homeless man in the city of Prague, whom he believes to be his doppelgänger. Even though Felix, the supposed doppelgänger, is seemingly unaware of their resemblance, Hermann insists that their likeness is most striking. Hermann is married to Lydia, a sometimes silly and forgetful wife (according to Hermann) who has a cousin named Ardalion. It is heavily hinted that Lydia and Ardalion are, in fact, lovers, although Hermann continually stresses how much Lydia loves him. On one occasion Hermann actually walks in on the pair, naked, but Hermann appears to be completely oblivious of the situation, perhaps deliberately so. After some time, Hermann shares with Felix a plan for both of them to profit off their shared likeness by having Felix briefly pretend to be Hermann. But after Felix is disguised as Hermann, Hermann kills Felix in order to have Lydia collect his own life insurance. He then intends to re-marry her under his new identity as Felix. Hermann considers the presumably perfect murder plot to be a work of art rather than a scheme to gain money. But as it turns out, there is no resemblance whatsoever between the two men, the murder is not 'perfect', and the murderer is about to be captured by the police in a small hotel in France, where he is hiding. Hermann, the narrator, switches to a diary mode at the very end just before his capture; the last entry is on April 1.

== Background ==
=== Publication history ===
Nabokov began to compose Despair while he was living in Berlin beginning in July 1932 and managed to complete the first draft on September 10 of the same year. The year in which Nabokov was writing Despair was a turbulent one for Germany. In June 1932, the Reichstag had collapsed. Incumbent President Paul von Hindenburg called for elections, leading to violence between the Nazis and Communists. The Nazi party was becoming more prominent; Hitler would be appointed chancellor in 1933. This would only fuel Nabokov's hatred for totalitarian governments, and this disdain was incorporated somewhat into Despair (Hermann is pro-Communist) and more prominently later on in Invitation to a Beheading (1936), Nabokov's next novel.

By 1935, Nabokov had become increasingly intrigued with the English language, and he elected to translate his two most recently written novels at the time, Laughter in the Dark (1932) (first translated as Camera Obscura) and Despair. Nabokov remarked that translating Despair was his "first serious attempt ... to use English for what may loosely termed an artistic purpose". The translation was finished on December 29 of that year. Nabokov sent the manuscript to Hutchinson & Co. in April 1936; the company had initial reservations, but eventually agreed to publish the book. The translation was checked by a Molly Carpenter-Lee, a student of Nabokov's friend Gleb Struve. The book was a complete flop commercially and Nabokov only earned €40, a minuscule amount even in the 1930s. The issue was that Hutchinson's only published cheap, "popular" novels, which Despair was not, and thus it was distributed to the wrong audience. Nabokov would later lament that Despair was "a rhinoceros in a world of hummingbirds".

=== Influences ===
Nabokov intended Hermann, and the novel in general, to be kind of a Dostoevskian (who is referred to as "Dusky and Dusty" in the novel) parody; this is even more evident as the original working title for the novel was to be Zapiski mistifikatora (Notes of a Hoaxer), akin to Dostoevsky's Notes from Underground. At one point, Hermann even contemplates titling his narrative The Double, before he realizes it has been used, and opts for Despair instead. Nabokov infamously despised Dostoevsky's writing, with its excessive soul-searching and glorification of criminals and prostitutes, and this is reflected in Despair and Hermann, who carries certain similarities to Raskolnikov, who had also planned a perfect murder in Crime and Punishment. Additionally, the book is rich in intertextual connections to other authors such as Pushkin, Gogol, Turgenev, Oscar Wilde, and Conan Doyle.

== Reception ==
Despair is generally acclaimed as one of Nabokov's better Russian novels, along with Invitation to a Beheading and The Gift (1938), and has a reasonable volume of literary criticism. British author Martin Amis ranked it second on his list of best Nabokov novels, with it trailing only Lolita (1955). However, Nabokov's biographer Brian Boyd seemed to have ambivalent feelings toward Despair, noting that although "Nabokov's sheer intelligence crackles in every line ... the book's style ... seems sadly lacking in its structure ... It never quite convinces, and page after page that would make one tingle with excitement in another context can here only intermittently overcome one's remoteness from a story whose central premise fails to merit the suspension of disbelief".

=== Analysis ===
Despair is the second Nabokov novel to feature unreliable narration from a first-person point of view, the first being The Eye with the character Smurov. However, The Eye was more of an experiment condensed in a hundred-page novella, whereas Despair takes the unreliable first-person narrator to its fully fledged form, rivaling Humbert Humbert from Lolita, and Hermann is in a sense Humbert's Russian cousin. Nabokov comments on this in the foreword to the later edition of Despair, where he remarks that "Hermann and Humbert are alike only in the sense that two dragons painted by the same artist at different periods of his life resemble each other. Both are neurotic scoundrels, yet there is a green lane in Paradise where Humbert is permitted to wander at dusk once a year; but Hell shall never parole Hermann". To put it simply, the reader can never be positive if Hermann is accurately narrating the events because he tends to overestimate his own skills and talents while ignoring reality around him.

Additionally, Despair is also a tale of false doubles, one of Nabokov's favorite themes. In it, doubling seems to be only an obsession with physical resemblances. Almost all of Nabokov's fictions make ample use of doubling, duplication, and mirroring, such as in Pale Fire and Lolita.

Vladislav Khodasevich pointed out that Nabokov is obsessed with a single theme: "the nature of the creative process and the solitary, freak-life role into which a man with such imagination is inevitably cast." Hermann, who sees himself as an artist composing the 'perfect murder', fits this description. In a similar fashion, Julian Connolly calls Despair "a cautionary tale of creative solipsism".

== Film adaptation ==
In 1978, the novel was adapted into the film Despair, directed by the German filmmaker Rainer Werner Fassbinder and starring Dirk Bogarde. The film's screenplay was adapted by Tom Stoppard.

== Sources ==
- Boyd, Brian (1991). Vladimir Nabokov : the Russian years. Princeton, N.J.: Princeton University Press. ISBN 9780691024707.
- Nabokov, Vladimir Vladimirovich (1989). Despair. New York: Vintage International. ISBN 9780679723431.
- Vernon, David (2022). Ada to Zembla: The Novels of Vladimir Nabokov. Edinburgh: Endellion Press. ISBN 978-1739136109.
