= The Potato Elf =

Short story by Vladimir Nabokov

"The Potato Elf" is a short story written in Russian by Vladimir Nabokov in Berlin where it was first published in the émigré daily Rul in 1929 and then included in the 1929 collection Vozvrashchenie Chorba ("The Return of Chorb"). It was initially translated into English by Serge Bertensen and Irene Kosinska for publication in Esquire in 1939, and reprinted in A Single Voice (Collier, London, 1969). Nabokov then retranslated the story and included it in A Russian Beauty and Other Stories in 1973.

== Plot summary ==
The Potato Elf, whose real name is Fred Dobson, is a dwarf who works in the circus where people laugh at him. After a tour through the continent, he returned to England. He gets beaten up when he tries to kiss a ballerina. Shock, the conjuror, takes him home so that he and his wife, Nora, can nurture him back to health. Nora and Fred have a one-night affair – Nora to get back at her husband who always does tricks, but Fred is in love. He quits the circus, plans to go to the north of England, and expects Nora to follow him. He tries to tell this to the conjuror who does not seem to listen. But in the evening, Shock pretends to have poisoned himself because of his wife's unfaithfulness, and Nora, in despair, realizes that she loves him. Fred moves to Drowse and receives Nora's letter: she will not come and will be going with her husband to America.

Fred retreats from life and lives like a recluse. Eight years later Nora visits him and announces that she has a son from him. Fred wants to see him but Nora leaves abruptly. He runs after her, excited to have a son, happy, and collapses at her feet. As people realize he is dead, Nora denies him: "I don't know anything. My son died a few days ago."

== Comments ==
The story evolved out of Nabokov's film script The Love of a Dwarf and he later commented on the "cinematic slant" of the narrative. Nabokov indicated that he wrote the story in 1929, although some argue that it was written in 1924. It is one of the earlier short stories written by Nabokov and takes place in England, in contrast to his usual Berlin settings of stories at that time. He was unhappy about the initial English translation and found it "full of mistakes and omissions". It was, nevertheless, the first appearance of one of his works in English. He considered his retranslation a "personal victory that seldom falls to a betrayed author's lot".
