= A Nursery Tale =

- Short story by Vladimir Nabokov
- Original title: Сказка
- Translator: Vladimir Nabokov, Dmitri Nabokov
- Language: Russian

Publication
- Published in: Rul'
- Publication type: Newspaper
- Publication date: 27 and 29 June 1926
- Published in English: 1975

"A Nursery Tale" (Russian: Сказка, Skazka) is a short story by Vladimir Nabokov first published in the expatriate Russian newspaper Rul' on 27 and 29 June 1926 and in the book form in The Return of Chorb in 1930. The English translation by the author and his son, Dmitri Nabokov has appeared in 1975 in collection Tyrants Destroyed and Other Stories.

== Plot summary ==
Erwin, the protagonist, is shy and “collects” an imaginary harem of women by tagging them mentally when looking from the streetcar. One day, he encounters the Devil in the shape of a German middle-aged women, Frau Monde, who tells him he can have all the women he can “collect” before midnight provided their number is uneven. Erwin tries to do so but ultimately fails.

== Comments ==
The story makes reference to a teenage girl as one of the women Erwin tries to make part of his collection, an early reference to the theme of hebephilia that is later spun out in Lolita. This may be the earliest reference in Nabokov's work to the attraction of pubescent girls.
