= Nabokov's Butterflies =

2000 book by Brian Boyd and Robert Michael Pyle

- First edition (publ. Allen Lane, UK)
- Editor: Brian Boyd, Michael Pyle
- Publication date: May 2000
- ISBN: 9780807085424

Nabokov’s Butterflies is a book edited and annotated by Brian Boyd and Robert Michael Pyle that examines and presents Vladimir Nabokov’s passion for butterflies and lepidopterology in his literary presentation.

The book contains a chapter by Boyd discussing the literary treatment of butterflies in VN’s work labeled "Nabokov, Literature, Lepidoptera", a chapter by Pyle to assess Nabokov’s standing as a lepidopterist ("Between Cloud and Climb") and writings of Nabokov concerning butterflies. The latter section includes previously unpublished writings by Nabokov, namely "Father’s Butterflies: Second Addendum to The Gift" (translated by Dmitri Nabokov) and "The Butterflies of Europe", notes concerning an unfinished book about the lepidoptera of Europe. The book also contains an addendum compiled by Pyle that lists butterflies described by Nabokov and butterflies named after him.

== Note ==
The above book is not to be confused with Nabokov’s Butterfly (ISBN 0-7867-1452-2), a book by Rick Gekosi, a bibliophile, who recounts his experiences in the collection and sale of rare books.
