= Orache (short story) =

"Orache" is a short story by Russian American author Vladimir Nabokov originally published in Russian in 1932.

== Summary ==
The story uses third-person narration and concerns itself with a child named Peter. The syntax and diction is, in some ways, childish, making the story stylistically comparable to the early portion of Joyce's A Portrait of the Artist as a Young Man. At school, another child (Dmitri Korff) shows Peter a magazine with a comic illustration announcing a duel between Peter's father and another member of the parliament whereat he works, asking "is it true?" As Peter did not know about the duel, he becomes upset, dreading his father's potential death. It's unknown to Peter in what medium the duel will progress, but his father's daily fencing lessons in the library suggest (to the reader) that it will be by sword (a clever red herring planted by Nabokov).

The boy's dread is captured symbolically (although Nabokov hated talk of symbols) by his mis-remembering a poem in front of his class; he recalls the dramatic 'ache' instead of the innocuous 'orache', a weed After much dread over his father's duel, which includes calling to mind Lenski falling like a "black sack" in Pushkin's Eugene Onegin (one of Nabokov's Russian favorites), the same student reveals to Peter that the events of the duel are recounted in that day's paper. Peter rushes to the school's porter, Andrey, to look into his paper, where it's written that the duel was bloodless, the opponent firing first, and missing, to which Peter's father fired into the air. In the end, Peter weeps with relief.
