= The Return of Chorb =

1929 short story by Vladimir Nabokov

"The Return of Chorb" is a short story by Vladimir Nabokov written in Russian under his pen name Vladimir Sirin in Berlin in 1925. In 1929 it became part of a collection of fifteen short stories and twenty-four poems also called The Return of Chorb (Russian: Vozvrashchenie Chorba) in Russian by "V. Sirin".

== English translation ==
After its publication in the Russian emigre press the story was translated into English by Gleb Struve as The Return of Tchorb and published in the Paris magazine This Quarter in 1932. More than four decades later Nabokov retranslated the story, as he found Struve's translation "not accurate enough and far removed from my present use of English", and incorporated the story in the collection Details of a Sunset and Other Stories in 1976. The two English translations are very different and represent an interesting study on Nabokov's theory of translation.

== Plot summary ==
The Kellers are a bourgeois couple living in a smaller German town whose daughter has married the Russian emigre writer Chorb. The distrust between Chorb and his father-in-law is deepened when Chorb and his bride escape from the formality of their wedding to spend their first night at a local seedy hotel. On the honeymoon, the bride accidentally touches a live electric wire near Nice and dies. Chorb now returns to recreate her image by visiting the sites they had been to together and to tell her parents. Arriving in the evening he only finds the maid at the Kellers' home as they have gone to the opera to see Parsifal. Chorb does not want to break the news to her and tells her that his bride is ill and he will be back in the morning. He returns to the hotel to spend the night in the same room he had been with his wife. Unable to stay in the room alone, he pays a prostitute to stay with him. When the Kellers get home, they are too alarmed to wait for the morning and leave for the hotel. There, during the night, Chorb sees his wife in the prostitute, screams, and the terrified woman is about to leave: at this moment the Kellers arrive.

== Comments ==
The Return of Chorb, one of the earliest short stories of Nabokov, contains a complicated structure due to the non-linear narrative and the buildup to a confrontation between Chorb and Keller that is ultimately withheld from the reader. The unnamed bride of Chorb has a supernatural, quasi spectral presence in the story underlined by the matter of her death through electricity and the ghost-like appearance of the prostitute when Chorb sees his wife in her.
