= Notes on Prosody =

First edition (publ. Routledge & Kegan Paul Ltd, 1964)

The book Notes on Prosody by author Vladimir Nabokov compares differences in iambic verse in the English and Russian languages, and highlights the effect of relative word length in the two languages on rhythm. Nabokov also proposes an approach for scanning patterns of accent which interact with syllabic stress in iambic verse. Originally Appendix 2 to his Commentary accompanying his translation of Aleksandr Pushkin's Eugene Onegin, Notes on Prosody was released separately in book form.

Notes on Prosody and Nabokov's translation of Eugene Onegin sparked considerable academic debate.

== Bely's influence ==
Nabokov in large part follows the system described by Andrei Bely in his paper "Description of the Russian iambic tetrameter" ("Опыт характеристики русского четырехстопного ямба") published in the collection of essays Symbolism (Символизм) (Moscow, 1910).

== Terminology ==
The word stress is reserved for the underlying unvarying pattern of the iambic rhythm, and the word accent is used to describe where the accent falls in speaking a line.

He introduces the notion of a scud, which he defines to be an unaccented stress (page 9). He uses U-shaped symbol and / to illustrate.

He describes a number of types of scuds (page 18):

- tilted scud — an inversion, where the accent falls on the first syllable of an iambic foot, of which there are various types:
  - split tilt — an accented monosyllable followed by an unaccented one
  - short tilt — an accented monosyllable followed by an unaccented first syllable of a polysyllabic word
  - duplex tilt — a disyllabic word where the accent falls on the first syllable in ordinary speech
  - long tilt — the first two syllables of a trisyllabic word, where the first syllable is accented in ordinary speech
- reverse tilt — an unaccented stress followed by an accented depression (non-stress) (thereby falling across two iambic feet) the main variety of which is the:
  - split reverse tilt — two monosyllables the first not accented and the second accented (i.e. the fairly common xx// ending to line)
  - duplex reverse tilt — a disyllabic word accented on the second syllable 'against the grain' of stress-unstress; Nabokov somewhat misinterprets Robert Bridges discussion of "Recession of accent" in his book Milton's Prosody, claiming that Bridges 'designates' the duplex reverse tilt as 'recession of accent', whereas Bridges starts from the phenomenon of 'recession of accent' as analysed by Alexander Schmidt and proceeds to analyse possible occurrences of it in Milton's verse.

== Differences between Russian and English verse ==
The primary source of the differences between Russian and English verse is that English has many one syllable nouns, verbs, and adjectives, where Russian words typically have many syllables, and carry only a single invariable stress. The iambic rhythm of alternating accented and unaccented syllables is relatively natural in English, whereas in Russian speech many unaccented syllables may quite naturally occur in sequence.

=== English iambic tetrameters ===
1. Scudless lines are more common than scudded lines.
2. Sequences of scudded lines are short.
3. Scuds are frequently associated with weak monosyllables, duplex tilts, and scudded rhymes (in the final foot)
4. Scuds in feet 1 and 2 occur about as frequently as in foot 3; scuds in foot 4 are rare. The line is weighted accentually towards its end.
5. Feminine rhymes are "scarce, insipid, or burlesque"
6. Elisions are relatively common.

=== Russian iambic tetrameters ===
1. Scudded lines are much more common than scudless lines.
2. Scuds often form linked patterns from line to line, often in sequences of twenty or more lines. Sequences of scudless lines rarely occur in sequences longer than two or three lines.
3. Scuds are frequently associated with the unaccented syllables of long words; there are almost no duplex tilts. Rhymes are not scudded (that is, there is no scud in the final foot).
4. Scuds in foot 3 are by far the most common. The line is weighted accentually towards its beginning.
5. Feminine rhymes are as frequent as masculine ones.
6. There are strictly speaking no elisions of any kind.

== See also ==
- Alexandrine
