= Sovremennye zapiski =

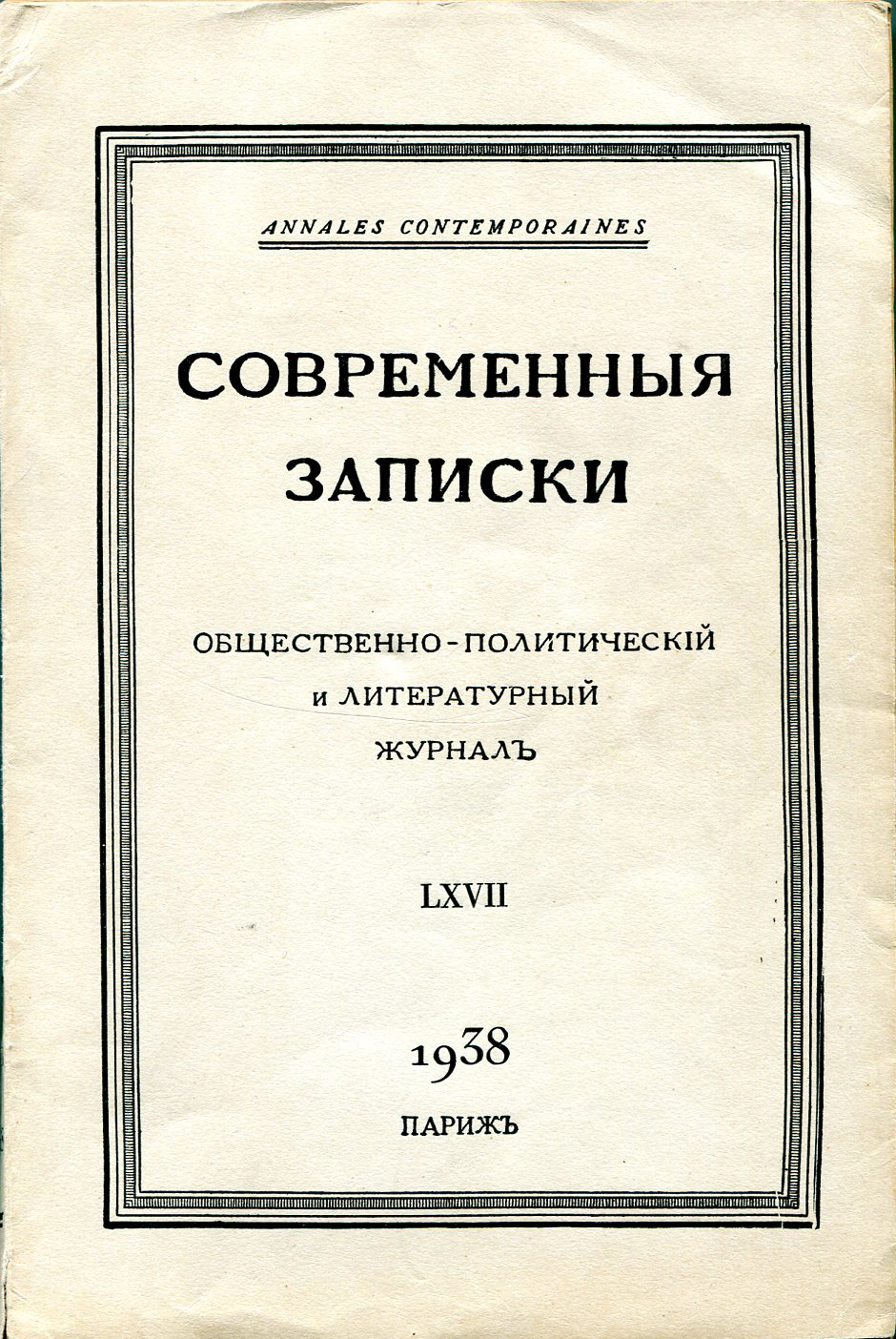
- Publisher: Sovremennye Zapiski Publishing House
- Country: France
- Language: Russian

Sovremennye zapiski (Russian: Современные записки, "Contemporary Papers") was a politicized literary journal published from 1920 to 1940. A group of adherents of the Russian Socialist-Revolutionary Party launched the journal during the Russian Civil War.

Headquartered in Paris, Sovremennye zapiski published the poetry, fiction, and articles of Russian emigrants, many of them highly respected writers and philosophers.

It is one of several Russian journals that published the early fiction of Vladimir Nabokov; Nabokov's novel Despair was first serialized in Sovremennye zapiski.

== Featured titles ==
- Vladimir Nabokov
  - Despair
  - Laughter in the Dark
  - The Gift
- Ivan Bunin
  - Mitya's Love
  - The Life of Arseniev
- Andrei Bely
  - The Baptized Chinaman
- Aleksey Nikolayevich Tolstoy
  - Sisters (first part of The Road to Calvary)

== See also ==
- February Revolution
- October Revolution
- Russian diaspora
