= The Man from the USSR and Other Plays =

- First edition
- Author: Vladimir Nabokov
- Translator: Dmitri Nabokov
- Publisher: Harcourt Brace
- Publication date: 1984
- Media type: Print
- Pages: 342
- ISBN: 978-0-15-156882-6

The Man from the USSR and Other Plays is a collection of four dramas by the Russian writer Vladimir Nabokov, first published in 1984. The plays were collected and translated from the original Russian by Nabokov's son, Dmitri Nabokov after his father's death. The volume consists of the plays 'The Pole' ('Polyus', written 1923), 'The Man from the USSR' ('Chelovek iz SSSR', written 1926), 'The Event' ('Sobytie', written 1938) and 'The Granddad' ('Dedushka').

== The Plays ==
=== 'The Pole' ===
'The Pole' is a one-act play in blank verse. It was written in 1923, when Nabokov was working as a farm labourer in France, and was first published on August 14 and 16 in Rul' (The Rudder), a Russian newspaper of which Nabokov's father had become editor in 1920. It was a response to Scott's diaries, which Nabokov had seen in the British Museum some years earlier. It depicts the deaths of last four members of Scott's crew, on their 1911/1912 expedition to the South Pole. Dmitri Nabokov described them, in the collection, as a 'deliberately free synthesis [...] not a journalistic reproduction'.

The first production of 'The Pole' was probably in 1996, directed by Klaus Michael Grüber. It opened on September 28, 1996, at the Berlin Schaubühne, and was followed by 20 performances in October. It was performed in German, translated by German playwright Botho Strauß.

=== 'The Man from the USSR' ===
'The Man from the USSR' was first produced in Berlin in 1926, and the first act was published in Rul' on January 1 the following year.

=== 'The Event' ===
'The Event' was written in Paris in 1938, and was published in Russkie zapiskie (Russian Annuls). The plot follows a painter in tsarist Russia and his wife as they await a convict who has threatened them with violence.

=== 'The Granddad' ===
'The Granddad' is a one-act verse play, which was first published in Rul' in October 1924. According to Kanfer's review in Time magazine, 'Because of the melodramatic structure and blank-verse dialogue, the play is the least successful.'

== Reception ==
The response to this collection has been small compared to the general response to Nabokov's work, due in part to the small proportion of his canon that drama represents.
