= Andrew Field =

American historian

Andrew David Field

Academic background
- Education: Dartmouth College (BA); Columbia University (PhD)
- Website: shanghaisojourns.net

Andrew Field is an American historian, documentary film producer, and professor at Duke Kunshan University. Based in Shanghai, Field is a scholar of musical history and creative culture in contemporary China, including the role jazz music played in 20th century Shanghai.

== Books ==
- Shanghai’s Dancing World: Cabaret Culture and Urban Politics (2010)
- Mu Shiying: China’s Lost Modernist (2014)
- Shanghai Nightscapes: A Nocturnal Biography of a Global City (2015)
- Rocking China: Music scenes in Beijing and beyond (2023)

== Filmography ==
- Down: Indie Rock in the PRC (2012) (Co-producer)
