= The Vane Sisters =

1951 short story by Vladimir Nabokov

"The Vane Sisters" is a short story by Vladimir Nabokov, written in March 1951. It is famous for providing one of the most extreme examples of an unreliable narrator. It was first published in the Winter 1958 issue of The Hudson Review and then reprinted in Encounter during 1959. The story was included in Nabokov's Quartet (1966), Nabokov's Congeries (1968; reprinted as The Portable Nabokov, 1971), Tyrants Destroyed and Other Stories (1975), and The Stories of Vladimir Nabokov (1995).

The narrator, a professor, recounts his experiences with the two sisters, and meditates upon the possibility of intervention by ghosts into his reality.

== Plot summary ==
On his usual Sunday afternoon stroll, the narrator, a French literature professor at a women's college, watches icicles dripping from a nearby eave with intense meditation. He walks on, and is distracted by the reddish shadows cast by a parking meter and restaurant sign. He runs into D., a former colleague who casually informs him that Cynthia Vane, with whom the narrator had formerly had a short relationship, has died.

The narrator recounts his memories of Cynthia and her younger sister Sybil. The married D. had an affair with the narrator's student Sybil. Cynthia first approaches the narrator in hopes of recruiting him to end the affair, instructing the narrator to tell D. that he should either divorce his wife or resign. He confronts D., who tells the narrator that he and his wife are moving to Albany, ending the affair.

The following day, the narrator gives his French literature class, which includes Sybil, an examination. When marking Sybil's exam that night, he finds a suicide note. He calls Cynthia only to find that Sybil has committed suicide.

After Sybil's death, the narrator begins seeing Cynthia and immerses himself in her philosophies of spiritualism and the occult. He attends parties along with Cynthia's circle of believers, and listens keenly to her theory that the dead control events great and small. Unconvinced, the narrator ridicules Cynthia's searches for acrostics, and playfully criticizes her party guests, to which Cynthia fiercely reacts by calling him a "prig" and "snob." This ends their relationship.

The story returns to the narrator's encounter with D. Having learnt of Cynthia's death, he is suddenly frantic, fearful, and incapable of sleep, preoccupied with the idea of Cynthia's ghost returning to haunt him as her philosophies suggested. He tries to fight her spirit by searching for acrostics in Shakespeare. His search fruitless, he falls asleep and awakens to find everything seemingly in order. He scoffs at the "disappointing" show, and the final paragraph reads:

I could isolate, consciously, little. Everything seemed blurred, yellow-clouded, yielding nothing tangible. Her inept acrostics, maudlin evasions, theopathies - every recollection formed ripples of mysterious meaning. Everything seemed yellowly blurred, illusive, lost.

== Acrostic ==
At one point, the narrator alludes to a "novel or short story (by some contemporary writer, I believe) in which, unknown to the author, the first letters of the words in its last paragraph formed, as 'Deciphered by Cynthia, a message from his dead mother'."

When the final paragraph of the story is subjected to this technique, the result is as follows: Icicles by Cynthia. Meter from me Sybil. The icicles and meter are references to the story's beginning where the narrator, who prides himself on his careful attention to detail, is transfixed by the minute effects of dripping icicles and shadows cast by a parking meter. Thus, this is the Nabokovian twist: at the end of the short story, the reader learns that the narrator is being unconsciously and mockingly influenced in both his writing and the events surrounding him by the dead sisters.

The very name of Sybil hints at the trick of the final paragraph, as the word acrostic was first applied to the prophecies of the Erythraean Sibyl, which were written on leaves and arranged so that the initial letters of the leaves always formed a word. Sybil Vane is also a character in Oscar Wilde's only novel The Picture of Dorian Gray (1890). She is an actress who commits suicide when Dorian rejects her, first causing the portrait to change and Dorian to notice the connection between him and the portrait.

== Literary significance ==
The apparent uniqueness of this narrative approach has created fame for this story, and Nabokov himself described this device as something that 'can only be tried once in a thousand years of fiction'. The trick ending of "The Vane Sisters" originally went unnoticed when the New Yorker rejected the story, and it was only revealed when Nabokov wrote a letter to the fiction editor, Katharine A. White, explaining the foundation of the story.
