= The Wood-Sprite =

"The Wood-Sprite" is a short story by Vladimir Nabokov, originally published in Russian in 1921. It was his first published story.

== Summary ==
The story is told in first-person narration and recounts the narrator's experience when he was visited, at his desk, by a "hunched, gray" wood-sprite, "powdered with the pollen of the frosty, starry night." The creature tells of his own exile from Russia and the hardships he has endured as a result. After a candle blows out, the narrator turns on the light only to be left alone with a "subtle scent in the room, of birch, of humid moss..."
