= Invitation to a Beheading =

1936 novel by Vladimir Nabokov

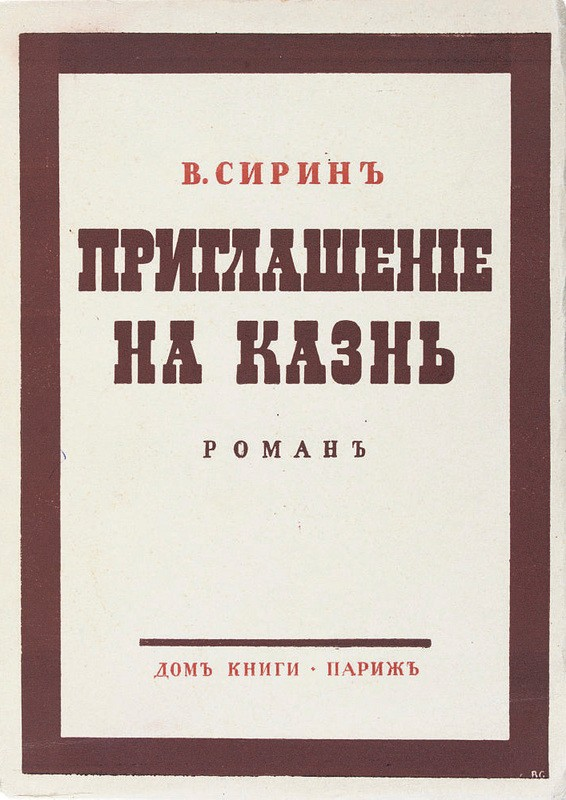
- First edition, under pen name V. Sirin
- Author: Vladimir Nabokov
- Original title: Приглашение на казнь
- Translator: Dmitri Nabokov in collaboration with the author
- Language: Russian
- Publisher: Sovremennye zapiski
- Publication date: 1935–1936

Invitation to a Beheading (Russian: Приглашение на казнь, lit. 'Invitation to an execution') is a novel by Russian American author Vladimir Nabokov. It was originally published in Russian from 1935 to 1936 as a serial in Sovremennye zapiski, a Russian émigré magazine. In 1938, the work was published in Paris, with an English translation following in 1959. The novel was translated into English by Nabokov's son, Dmitri Nabokov, under the author's supervision.

The novel is often described as Kafkaesque, but Nabokov claimed that at the time he wrote the book, he was unfamiliar with German and "completely ignorant" of Franz Kafka's work. Nabokov interrupted his work on The Gift in order to write Invitation to a Beheading, describing the creation of the first draft as "one fortnight of wonderful excitement and sustained inspiration." Some scholars have argued that the central plot of Invitation to a Beheading has its roots in Chernyshevski, a character from The Gift. Another view is that the novel functions as a roman à clef with the Platonic Socrates as its target.

Nabokov stated in an interview that, although, of all his novels, he had the greatest affection for Lolita, it was for Invitation to a Beheading that he had the greatest "esteem".

== Plot introduction ==
The novel takes place in a prison and relates the final nineteen days of Cincinnatus C., a citizen of a fictitious country, who is imprisoned and sentenced to death for "gnostical turpitude." Unable to blend in and become part of the world around him, Cincinnatus is described as having a "certain peculiarity" that makes him "impervious to the rays of others, and therefore produces when off his guard a bizarre impression, as of a lone dark obstacle in this world of souls transparent to one another." Although he tries to hide his condition and "feign translucence," people are uncomfortable with his existence, and feel there is something wrong with him. In this way, Cincinnatus fails to become part of his society.

While confined, Cincinnatus is not told when his execution will occur. This troubles him, as he wants to express himself through writing "in defiance of all the world's muteness," but feels unable to do so without knowledge of how long he has to complete this task. Indifferent to the absurdity and vulgarity around him, Cincinnatus strives to find his true self in his writing, where he creates an ideal world. Taken to be executed, he refuses to believe in either death or his executioners, and as the axe falls the false existence dissolves around him as he joins the spirits of his fellow visionaries in "reality."

== Plot summary ==
Narrated omnisciently, the novel opens with Cincinnatus C., a thirty-year-old teacher and the protagonist, being sentenced to death by beheading for the crime "gnostical turpitude" in twenty days' time (though this timescale is undisclosed to Cincinnatus). After being taken back to a "fortress" by the cheerful jailer Rodion, Cincinnatus talks to his lawyer and dances with Rodion, before inscribing his thoughts on paper, as a spider dangles from the ceiling. Throughout the plot, Cincinnatus repeatedly inquires of various characters about the date of his execution, but to no avail. Cincinnatus is displeased to learn from the prison director, Rodrig, that he will be getting a cellmate. Cincinnatus soon meets Emmie, Rodrig's young daughter, and then reads the foolish prisoner's rules etched into the wall, flips through a book catalogue, and is brought by Rodrig down the hall to observe his incoming cellmate through a peephole.

Almost a week after the trial, Cincinnatus excitedly expects his unfaithful wife (and unrequited love), Marthe, but she postpones her visit. There is some confusion surrounding the director's transformation into Rodion, the jailer, who expels Cincinnatus from the cell so he can clean it, allowing Cincinnatus to wander, dreaming of freedom and running away. Cincinnatus sees Emmie again, bouncing a ball in front of a picture of a garden he mistakes for a window. The next morning, Cincinnatus meets his new prisonmate, the charismatic Monsieur Pierre, over whom the director fawns adoringly, but Cincinnatus shows his disapproval.

On the eighth day of his imprisonment alone, Cincinnatus resumes his writing, fearfully confessing his painful emotions. He longs for a world, away from superficiality, for people like him, who have a deeper understanding of their existence. In the morning, Marthe arrives with her whole family, including another lover, but Cincinnatus cannot cross the cell, cluttered with temporary furniture for the guests, in time to speak with his wife before everyone is ushered out. Next, Pierre revisits and chides Cincinnatus, as the director once did, for his lack of gratitude for everyone's pleasantness in the prison. A few days later, Cecilia C., Cincinnatus's estranged mother, enters the cell against Cincinnatus's wishes, and she explains the strange circumstances surrounding his birth and his father especially. That night Cincinnatus hears odd noises, and the wall caves in, revealing that Pierre has been digging a tunnel between their cells. Pierre invites him to see his cell, but Cincinnatus emerges from another hole, where Emmie guides him into a dining room in which Rodrig and his wife are eating dinner with Pierre. Cincinnatus is invited to eat too, and Rodrig hands him a photohoroscope album chronicling Emmie's future life.

Later, back in Cincinnatus's cell, Pierre is revealed to be the executioner and the date of Cincinnatus' execution is finally disclosed: the day after tomorrow. The city officials soon convene at the deputy city manager's house to meet with Pierre and Cincinnatus. Afterwards, Cincinnatus, again racked with fear, writes about it, wishing he could not feel it. Rodion enters the cell with a moth as a meal for the spider, but it escapes. Marthe next visits alone, and they converse about Cincinnatus's letter. She begs him to repent of his "wrongdoings", to which Cincinnatus dismisses her for the final time.

The day of Cincinnatus' execution finally arrives. As Rodrig and Roman clean and dismantle the cell, the spider is revealed to be a toy. Terrified, Cincinnatus is taken by carriage to the square, where townspeople have already congregated. He musters enough strength to climb the scaffold on his own. In the ensuing moments, M'sieur Pierre dons his apron and demonstrates to Cincinnatus how to lie on the block. Cincinnatus begins counting backwards from ten in preparation for the apparent beheading. Suddenly, he gets up and walks down the scaffolding, presumably free from his physical body and existence.

== Characters ==
Cincinnatus C.
The main character, a thirty-year-old teacher awaiting his death sentence for committing "gnostical turpitude". He is described as a disheartened erudite.
M'sieur Pierre
The executioner. During the events of the novel, he is disguised as a fellow prisoner, and pushes his friendship onto Cincinnatus as an elaborate prank. He is described as fat, well-dressed, and thirty years old.
Rodion
The jailer. He is astounded by Cincinnatus' mentality, and rebukes him to change his perspective. He is described as fat and jovial.
Rodrig Ivanovich
The prison director. A conceited figure, he continuously boasts about the reputation of his institution, and chides Cincinnatus for his ill-mannered experience in the prison. He is described as donning a toupee and frock coat.
Emmie
The endearing, twelve-year-old daughter of the prison director. She frequents Cincinnatus' prison cell, and farcically promises to help him escape.
Marthe
The wife of Cincinnatus. Unfaithful to her husband, she takes up sexual relations with Rodion and Rodrig, as well as several other lovers. She is described as possessing youthful beauty.
Cecilia C.
The speculative mother of Cincinnatus (he was raised in an orphanage). She is a midwife, and described as being overtly bereaved by her son's situation, yet strangely apathetic.
Roman Vissarionovich
Cincinnatus' attorney. He visits Cincinnatus frequently, but to no avail of his client. He is described as being tall and dismal.

== Symbols and motifs ==
Nabokov employs a wide range of symbols and motifs within Invitation to a Beheading, many of which are still debated among literary scholars today. Perhaps the two, largest spheres of symbolism Nabokov employs are in terms of political and religious connotations. Politically, scholars have drawn parallels in Nabokov's work to other authors (George Orwell and Franz Kafka in particular) who have comprised characters often grappling with "individual will and totalitarian collectivity". However, it is worth noting that Nabokov apparently did not intend this work to be a political novel. In fact, he dismissed the comparison to Orwell. Still, scholars and readers alike have been hard-pressed to gloss over the uncanny political connotations to Nabokov's plight in escaping the Bolshevist regime just fifteen years prior.

In spite of his propensity to highlight anti-religious sentiments in many of his works, scholars have cited Invitation of a Beheading as the legitimate product of Nabokov's concern with the metaphysical, or "the beyond". This is evident in several respects, including the novel's epigraph, Nabokov's treatment of Gnostic ideology through his main character, Cincinnatus, and the overall construction of the setting in which such events take place.

The very first metaphysical overtone readers are confronted with encompasses the epigraph. Here, Nabokov ascribes the following French proverb to the fictitious Pierre Delalande: "Comme un fou se croit Dieu, nous nous croyons mortels (As a fool believes himself to be God, we believe ourselves to be mortal"). The quote can be said to directly foreshadow Cincinnatus' world and its inept inhabitants, whom the third-person narrator constantly labels as "transparent". This is in stark contrast to the narrator's description of Cincinnatus, who is considered "opaque" and "impervious to the rays of others".

Nabokov's epigraph becomes even clearer as Cincinnatus' circumstances and crime are revealed. Cincinnatus is being sentenced for "gnostical turpitude". The construction of this offense is grounded in Nabokov's knowledge of Gnosticism, a religion prevalent at the crux of the Late Hellenistic and early Christianity periods. At the heart of this religious doctrine is the notion of gnosis, or knowledge that brings salvation. Many scholars believe Cincinnatus models these ideologies, especially in relation to the Gnostic polarity of spirit and flesh (pneuma v. hyle), where Cincinnatus' true existence (as spirit) is thought to be barred within his physical body (the flesh). Thus, the release of this inner man is commonly thought to be accomplished through death, which acts as a passageway between flesh and spirit and explains the confusion of events at the conclusion of Nabokov's novel. Cincinnatus accomplishes just this transformation: "He stood up and...took off his head like a toupee, took off his collarbones like shoulder straps, took off his rib cage like a hauberk...what was left of him gradually dissolved, hardly coloring the air", and again, "Through the headsman's still swinging hips the railing showed. On the steps the pale librarian sat doubled up, vomiting...Cincinnatus slowly descended from the platform and walked off through the shifting debris".

Other religious symbols include:

- The moon, which hangs outside of Cincinnatus' cell window, and is a common Gnostic metaphor for "one of the seven Archons [demons] who keep watch over the gates to the planetary spheres",
- Cincinnatus' enigmatic father, who models Gnostic belief in the "unknowable God...the unknown Father",
- And Cincinnatus' mother, Cecilia C. who models the Gnostic notion of a Messenger, or Mediator, as she discloses the events surrounding her son's birth.

== Publication and reception ==
Second only to Lolita in terms of critical receptions, Invitation to a Beheading has received positive reviews since its initial publication in Berlin, 1934. It has also been considered "one of the most successful works of young émigré literature". Many scholars believed Cincinnatus C. to be a rendition of Franz Kafka's main character, Joseph K. in his novel, The Trial, although Nabokov denied this. Scholars have also noted the novel's embellished style which straddles the "illusory and the 'real'", drawing parallels to Carroll's Alice in Wonderland; Nabokov had served as that novel's Russian translator in 1923. In addition, Nabokov's execution scene has been compared to Kiernan's chapter of Ulysses.

== Stage adaptation ==
The adaptation for theatrical performance at Joseph Papp's Public Theater received bad reviews from several critics when it opened in March, 1969.

== Film adaptation ==
In September 2021, Uri Singer acquired the rights to adapt the novel.

== See also ==
- Dymer

== Bibliography ==
- Dragunoiu, Dana (2001). "Vladimir Nabokov's 'Invitation to a Beheading' and the Russian Radical Tradition". Journal of Modern Literature. Vol. 25, no. 1. pp. 53–69.
- Peterson, Dale (1981). "Nabokov's Invitation: Literature as Execution". PMLA. 96 (5). Modern Language Association: 824–836. doi:10.2307/462126. JSTOR 462126. S2CID 163376594.
- Schumacher, Meinolf (2002). "Gefangensein - 'waz wirret daz?' Ein Theodizee-Argument des 'Welschen Gastes' im Horizont europäischer Gefängnis-Literatur von Boethius bis Vladimir Nabokov". Beweglichkeit der Bilder. Text und Imagination in den Illustrierten Handschriften des 'Welschen Gastes' von Thomasin von Zerclaere. pp. 238–255 PDF.
- Nabokov, Vladimir (1959). Invitation to a Beheading. pp. 11, 24, 95, 133, 221.
- Vernon, David (Edinburgh, 2022). Ada to Zembla: The Novels of Vladimir Nabokov. Ch.8, 'Invitation to a Beheading: Negating Negation', pp. 113–122.
