= Spring in Fialta =

1936 short story by Vladimir Nabokov

"Spring in Fialta" is a short story written by Vladimir Nabokov in 1936, originally as Весна в Фиальте (Vesna v Fial'te) in Russian, during his exile in Berlin. The English translation was performed by Nabokov and Peter Pertzov. Spring in Fialta is included in Nine Stories and Nabokov's Dozen.

== Synopsis ==
Victor, the narrator, serendipitously encounters Nina, a fellow exile, at Fialta, a fictional Mediterranean town. Both are married and have met and flirted on several occasions over the years since their first kiss in Russia, “at the margins of [his] life”.

Nina is attractive, seemingly aloof, and ephemeral. Victor, on the other hand, though still feeling deep affection for her, lacks the conviction of true love. He has remained faithful in his own marriage, while she has had multiple affairs that have gone ignored by her husband, Ferdinand, beyond his using them for business connections.

The story drifts between past and present, as Victor recalls past encounters. He also expresses deprecatory and possibly jealous views of Ferdinand, with whom he is nominally friends but secretly views as an “arrogant” Franco-Hungarian writer and a “weaver of words”.

At the end of their meeting, Victor declines to join Nina and her husband on a car ride. His last words to her are a suggestion that he may love her, immediately after which he says he is "only joking". Later, he learns they have been involved in a car crash in which Ferdinand, the "invulnerable rogue", escapes with minor injury, but in which Nina perishes.

== Comments ==
The story incorporates many of Nabokov’s themes and techniques that are present in later novels: recreating events by memory, the issue of reality, relationship to women, the sense of loss, recalling Russia, the relationship to the double, the unreliable narrator, and a non-chronological narrative.

It has been argued that both the narrator and Nina’s husband, Ferdinand, bear some resemblance to Nabokov. While the plot was invented, the story may be a "tangential record" of an extramarital affair that Nabokov may have engaged in.

Nabokov's attempts to publish the manuscript in English in the United States met with initial disappointment, and he referred to it as a "boomerang variety of manuscript".

== Critical reception ==
The story was ranked by Publishers Weekly as the second greatest short story by Nabokov, after “Signs and Symbols”.
