= A Matter of Chance =

1924 short story by Vladimir Nabokov

"A Matter of Chance" is a short story by Vladimir Nabokov written in Russian under his pen name Vladimir Sirin in Berlin in 1924. It was rejected by the newspaper Rul and first published by the émigré magazine Segodnya in Riga. In 1974 it became part of a collection of thirteen stories called Tyrants Destroyed and Other Stories published by McGraw-Hill. In 1995, it was included in The Stories of Vladimir Nabokov, edited by his son Dmitri Nabokov.

== Plot summary ==
A Russian émigré, Aleksey Luzhin is working as a dining car attendant on the Berlin-Paris express. In a state of terminal despair, he dreams of a lost St. Petersburg and a lost wife Lena. He has become a cocaine addict, and he plans to commit suicide by putting his head between the buffers of two coupling carriages.

Unknown to him, his wife gets on the train to join him in Paris and meets an elderly princess who is a family friend of her husband. Luzhin just fails to put out the dining car reservation slips (and thus recognise his wife's name), and he cannot remember who the princess is when he sees her. His wife just fails to enter the dining car and loses her wedding ring instead. When the dining car is disconnected for cleaning Luzhin just fails to discover the ring, descends from the carriage to commit his fatal act, and is run down instead by a passing express.
