= A Guide to Berlin (short story) =

1925 short story by Vladimir Nabokov

"A Guide to Berlin" (original Russian title "Путеводитель по Берлину") is a 1925 short text by Vladimir Nabokov. Rather than a guide to the city, it is a partly fictional, partly autobiographical text documenting a series of anecdotal images that serve as metaphors. It was later translated by the author and his son, Dmitri Nabokov, into English and included in the collection Details of a Sunset and Other Stories (1976).

A central premise of "A Guide to Berlin" is that “the sense of literary creation” is “to portray ordinary objects as they will be reflected in the kindly mirrors of future times", indicative of the theme of intentionality in writing fiction.

== Background ==
Nabokov and his family were forced to leave Russia after the October Revolution. In 1922, he moved to Berlin after completing his studies at University of Cambridge in England. His father had been assassinated by a Russian monarchist in Berlin. Nabokov supported himself in part by writing short pieces in Russian for the Russian émigré community in the city.

== Summary ==
In the story the narrator recounts to a friend his visit to the Berlin zoo. In the short sections--"The Pipes," "The Streetcar," "Work," "Eden," and "The Pub"—he describes everyday aspects of life in the city in vivid, typically Nabokovian, detail. In "The Streetcar," he adumbrates his vision of the purpose of "literary creation":

To portray ordinary objects as they will be reflected in the kindly mirrors of future times; to find in the objects around us the fragrant tenderness that only posterity will discern and appreciate in the far-off times when every trifle of our plain everyday life will become exquisite and festive in its own right: the times when a man who might put on the most ordinary jacket of today will be dressed up for an elegant masquerade.

His "pot companion" (drinking buddy) in the pub pronounces the guide to be a poor one of a "boring, expensive city," and does not understand the narrator’s preoccupation with streetcars, tortoises, or the publican's young son’s view from the rear annex. The last aspect is the salient one; the narrator believes that the child will always have some manner of dim recollection of this childhood view and time, impregnated by details that will seem to him unique or special. This is exactly how the narrator feels about his own experiences around Berlin that day. He derives great pleasure from the aesthetics and social mechanisms, though others may not. It is the possibility of having experienced objects which might interest, entertain or mould others that so fascinates him.
