= The Eye (novel) =

1930 novel by Vladimir Nabokov

- First English edition
- Author: Vladimir Nabokov
- Original title: Соглядатай (Sogliadatai)
- Translator: Dmitri Nabokov
- Language: Russian
- Publisher: Phaedra
- Publication date: 1930
- English publication date: 1965

The Eye (Russian: Соглядатай, Sogliadatai, literally 'voyeur' or 'peeper'), written in 1930, is Vladimir Nabokov's fourth novel. It was translated into English by the author's son Dmitri Nabokov in 1965.

At approximately 80 pages, The Eye is considered Nabokov's shortest novel. Nabokov himself referred to it as a 'little novel' and it is a work that sits somewhere around the boundary between extended short story and novella. It was produced during a hiatus in Nabokov's creation of short stories between 1927 and 1930 as a result of his growing success as a novelist.

As in many of Nabokov's early works, the characters are largely Russian émigrés relocated to Europe, specifically Berlin. In this case, the novel is set in two houses where a young Russian tutor, Smurov, rents a room and receives board.

== Plot summary ==
The action of the novel largely begins after the (perhaps fatal) suicide attempt of the protagonist. This occurs after he suffers a beating at the hands of a cuckolded husband (the protagonist has been having an affair with a woman called Matilda with whom he has also, apparently, been rather bored). After his supposed death, and assuming everything in the world around him to be a manifestation of his 'leftover' imagination, his "eye" observes a group of Russian émigrés as he tries to ascertain their opinions of the character Smurov, around whom much uncertainty and suspicion exists.

== Themes ==
The novel deals largely with indeterminate locus of identity and the social construction of identity in the reactions and opinions of others. Smurov exists as a fraud, nobleman, scoundrel, "sexual adventurer", thief, and spy in the eyes of the various characters. In some senses, Smurov is akin to the narrator of Dostoevsky's Notes from Underground. As the protagonist carefully collects these observations, he attempts to build a stable perspective on Smurov — whom we only belatedly discover is the narrator himself. The result is a meditation on the relationship between subjectivity and objectivity.

The work is the first one in Nabokov's oeuvre involving a first-person narrator and, specifically, one who imposes his fantasy world upon the real world. This was to be a structure that was developed further in later works such as Despair (1934), Pale Fire (1962) and his final novel, Look at the Harlequins! (1974). In a 1967 interview with Alfred Appel Jr., Nabokov retrospectively suggested that the work might have represented a turning-point in his career in this respect.
