= The Leonardo =

1933 short story by Vladimir Nabokov

"The Leonardo" is a short story written in Russian by Vladimir Nabokov in Berlin in the summer of 1933. It was first published as Korolyyok in Posledniye Novosti in Paris the same year, and in 1956 as part of the collection Vesna v Fialte. After its translation into English by the author and his son Dmitri Nabokov it was incorporated into the collection A Russian Beauty and Other Stories and published in 1971.

== Plot summary ==
The narrator assembles the props for the story, and the actors appear: Gustav and his brother Anton are two beer-drinking German thugs, and the new lodger, Romantovski, who moves in with a heap of books. Romantovski appears different from the brothers; they try to investigate him further, visit him and sell him a pipe. They monitor him closely, try to get him drunk, and start to accost him. Finally Gustav uses his fiance, Anna, to stir him up. Out of fear Romantovski agrees to take her out to a movie. After the movie, Gustav and Anton intercept them, and Gustav goes about to "teach him a lesson" for going out with his girl. Romantovski gets assassinated. The police investigation of his apartment reveals him to be a counterfeiter, - "a leonardo (from the name of the painter)". The narrator is shocked to learn this, thinking that he was a poet, and disappointed he sees the objects he had assembled for the story disappear.

== Comments ==
The story was written in 1933 at a time when Hitler had just taken power, and Nabokov's description of the brothers reflects the mentality and methods of Nazi thugs. The figure of Romastoski is peculiar as he initially appears to be a literary man, but as the story evolves he is a criminal according to the police report. The story gives no clue to indicate that the police report was manipulated, however there is no evidence that the police searches for the murderer. The murderer feels cheated by the victim when he had sold him the pipe and was paid in counterfeit money. The narrator is unreliable, he assembles the set, set things into motion, becomes personally disgusted by the brothers ("fecal matter replacing the human brain"), yet, although the narrator/creator displays omniscience, at the end he indicates being surprised about the activities of "the leonardo".
