= A Russian Beauty and Other Stories =

Short story collection by Vladimir Nabokov

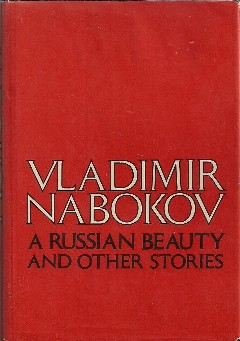
- First edition
- Author: Vladimir Nabokov
- Translator: Dmitri Nabokov, Vladimir Nabokov; Simon Karlinsky
- Language: English
- Publisher: McGraw-Hill
- Publication date: 1973
- Pages: 268
- ISBN: 0-07-045735-2
- OCLC: 447413
- Dewey Decimal: 891.7/3/42
- LC Class: PZ3.N121 Ru PG3476.N3

A Russian Beauty and Other Stories is a collection of thirteen short stories by Russian author Vladimir Nabokov. The short stories in this collection were originally written in Russian between 1927 and 1940 under the pseudonym Vladimir Sirin. Before being collated into short story collections, some were published by various European Russian émigré newspapers and magazines.

This collection was published in English in 1973 by McGraw-Hill in New York, it was translated by Nabokov himself and his son Dmitri Nabokov as well as Simon Karlinsky who collaborated with the author to translate the first short story "A Russian Beauty".

== Stories included ==
- "A Russian Beauty" written in 1934
- "The Leonardo" written in 1933
- "Torpid Smoke" written in 1935
- "Breaking the News" written in 1935
- "Lips to Lips" written in 1932
- "A Visit to the Museum" written in 1931
- "An Affair of Honor" written in 1927
- "Terra Incognita" written in 1931
- "A Dashing Fellow" written in 1930
- "Ultima Thule" written in 1940
- "Solus Rex" written in 1940
- "The Potato Elf" written in 1929
- "The Circle" written in 1934
