= Details of a Sunset and Other Stories =

1976 collection of thirteen short stories by Vladimir Nabokov

- First edition
- Author: Vladimir Nabokov
- Translator: Dmitri Nabokov, Vladimir Nabokov
- Language: English
- Publisher: McGraw-Hill
- Publication date: 1976
- Pages: 179
- ISBN: 0-07-045709-3
- OCLC: 1818528
- Dewey Decimal: 891.7/3/42
- LC Class: PZ3.N121 Dg PG3476.N3

Details of a Sunset and Other Stories is a collection of thirteen short stories by Vladimir Nabokov. All were written in Russian by Nabokov between 1924 and 1935 as an expatriate in Berlin, Paris, and Riga and published individually in the émigré press at that time later to be translated into English by him and his son, Dmitri Nabokov. The collection was published with a foreword by the author in 1976.

== Stories included ==
- "Details of a Sunset"
- "A Bad Day"
- "Orache"
- "The Return of Chorb"
- "The Passenger"
- "A Letter that Never Reached Russia"
- "A Guide to Berlin"
- "The Doorbell"
- "The Thunderstorm"
- "The Reunion"
- "A Slice of Life"
- "Christmas"
- "A Busy Man"

== Reception ==
Kirkus Reviews characterized some of the stories as "forgettable", but praised Christmas and A Busy Man as "singularly beautiful" and the best stories of the collection. Marina T. Naumann, writing for the Slavic Review, praised Christmas, The Return of Chorb, The Passenger, and The Doorbell as the best short stories of the collection.
