= Tyrants Destroyed and Other Stories =

1975 short story collection by Vladimir Nabokov

- First edition
- Author: Vladimir Nabokov
- Translator: Dmitri Nabokov, Vladimir Nabokov
- Language: English
- Publisher: McGraw-Hill
- Publication date: 1975
- English publication date: 1975
- Pages: 238
- ISBN: 0-07-045739-5
- OCLC: 15542348

Tyrants Destroyed and Other Stories is a collection of thirteen short stories by Vladimir Nabokov. All but the last one were written in Russian by Nabokov between 1924 and 1939 as an expatriate in Berlin, Paris, and Menton, and later translated into English by him and his son, Dmitri Nabokov. These stories appeared first individually in the Russian émigré press. The last story was written in English in Ithaca, New York in 1951. The collection was published in 1974.

== Stories included ==
- "Tyrants Destroyed"
- "A Nursery Tale"
- "Music"
- "Lik"
- "Recruiting"
- "Terror"
- "The Admiralty Spire"
- "A Matter of Chance"
- "In Memory of L. I. Shigaev"
- "Bachmann"
- "Perfection"
- "Vasiliy Shishkov"
- "The Vane Sisters"

== Reception ==
Kirkus Reviews gave a positive review of the collection, writing that "the voice and manner are cultivated, elegant and composed in that unique Nabokovian mix of hauteur and human understanding." Temira Pachmuss, writing for the Slavic Review, praised the poetic language and called the collection "a welcome addition to Nabokov's oeuvre in English".
