= Music (short story) =

"Music" is a short story by Russian American author Vladimir Nabokov originally published in Russian in 1932.

== Summary ==
The story uses third-person narration and tells the story of Victor, a self-conscious man for whom "music he did not know... could be likened to the patter of a conversation in a strange tongue." When Victor arrives at a party, he finds the other guests listening with varying degrees of engagement to a man named Wolfe play the piano. As Victor does not know the song being played, he loses interest. He catches a glimpse of his ex-wife at the party, but cannot look at her. He laments the fact that now he must "start all over" the long task of forgetting her (in a flashback, it's revealed that she left him for another, who may or may not be at the party). Throughout the entire story, Victor views the music as a structure that has him encaged in an awkward situation with his ex-wife; it had seemed to him "a narrow dungeon" until it ends, thus giving his ex-wife the opportunity to leave, which she does. Victor then realizes that the music was not a dungeon, but actually "incredible bliss, a magic glass dome that had embraced and imprisoned him and her," and which allowed him to "breathe the same air as she." After she leaves, another party-goer comments to Victor that he looked immune to the music and that he didn't think such a thing possible. His own inanity is revealed when Victor asks him what was played and he cannot tell whether it was Beethoven's Kreutzer Sonata or Tekla Bądarzewska-Baranowska's rather easy piece, Maiden's Prayer.

== Comments ==
The story features a few examples of Nabokov's fascination with reflections and doubles, even though they don't have any thematic importance. He gives us Victor's reflection in a mirror straightening a reflected tie, as well as Wolfe's hands reflected "in the lacquered depths of the open keyboard lid... engaged in a ghostly, intricate, even somewhat clownish mimicry."
