= Lips to Lips =

"Lips to Lips" is a short story written in Russian by Vladimir Nabokov in Berlin in or about 1931. It was first published in 1956 as part of the collection Vesna v Fialte. After its translation into English by the author and his son it was first published in Esquire in 1971 and then in the collection A Russian Beauty and Other Stories in 1971.

== Plot summary ==
The Russian émigré writer Ilya Borisovich Tal is struggling with his love story Lips to Lips about an elderly man and a young woman. He gets advice from his friend Euphratski who suggests to send "your thing" as a serial to Arion, an émigré magazine. The editor lavishes Tal with praise and indicates they "would have been" happy to publish it. Euphratski explains that some money needs to be supplied to support further publications of the magazine, and Tal obliges. The first chapter gets published as a "prologue to a novel" under the pen name "A. Ilyin" although Tal had requested the pen name "I(lya) Annenski" (not being aware that Annensky was a famous Russian writer). Nevertheless, he is extremely proud and happy about his success, although behind his back, people snicker. When he has a chance to meet the editor, he overhears a conversation where the editor defends accepting the article; it is of "hopeless mediocrity" and was only accepted because of the money. Tal is shattered at first, but recovers in the hope that he might publish more, and will be "fully recognized after his death".

== Comments ==
"Lips to Lips" was written in 1931 and accepted for publication in Posledniye Novosti but its scheduled publication in 1932 was cancelled when the editors realized the story was based on the real literary scandal of the writer Aleksandr Burov and the journal Chisla, which regularly had disparaged Nabokov and boycotted the writer Vladislav Khodasevich. Like Arion, the strategy of Chisla to stay financially solvent was to entice a would-be writer to support the journal in exchange for publishing his novel in installments. Thus, it had to wait a quarter century for its appearance. Nabokov remarked that by then everybody who might have resembled anybody in the story was "safely and heirlessly dead".
