= Laughter in the Dark (novel) =

1932 novel by Vladimir Nabokov

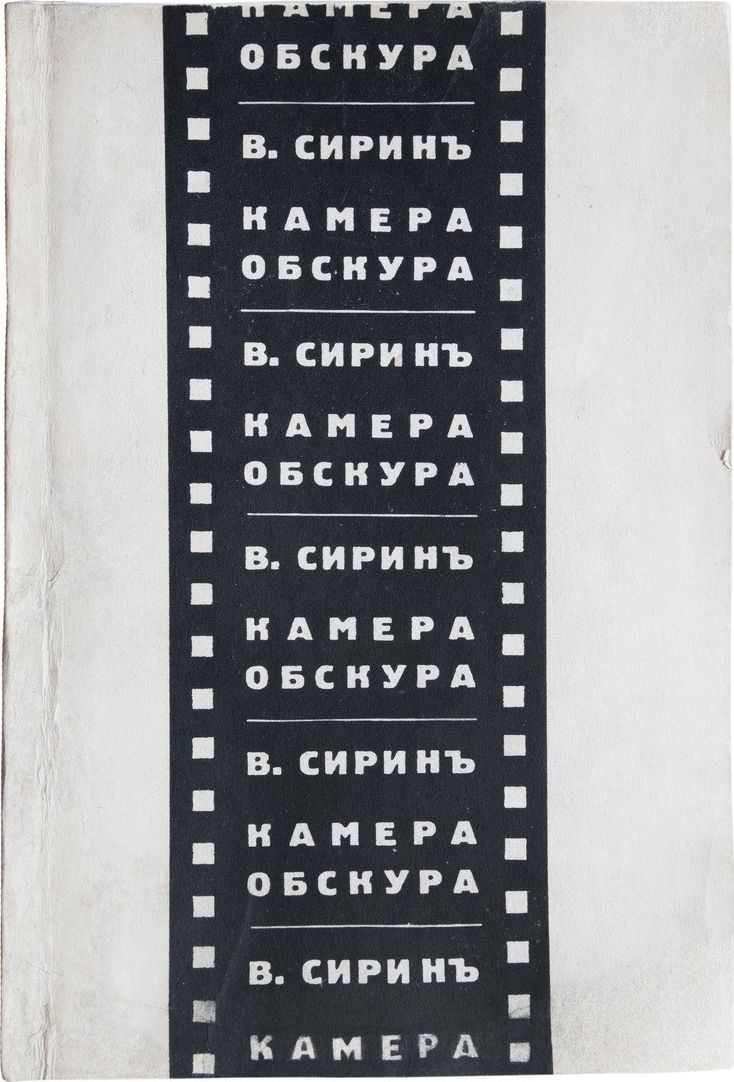
- First Russian edition (1932)
- Author: Vladimir Nabokov
- Original title: Камера обскура
- Language: Russian
- Genre: Novel
- Publisher: Sovremennye zapiski, Parabola
- Publication date: 1932
- Publication place: Germany, France

Laughter in the Dark (Original Russian title: Ка́мера обску́ра, Camera obscura) is a novel written by Vladimir Nabokov and serialised in Sovremennye zapiski in 1932.

The first English translation, Camera Obscura, was made by Winifred Ray and produced in London in 1935 by John Long, the paperback imprint of Hutchinson Publishing, with the author credited as Vladimir Nabokoff-Sirin. Nabokov was so displeased by the translation's quality that he undertook his own, which was published in 1938 under the now common name, Laughter in the Dark. It is sometimes mistakenly assumed that he was not fond of the book, yet in fact it was based on very personal breakthroughs in his life.

The book deals with a middle-aged man who leaves his wife for a younger woman, who doesn't love him but enjoys the lifestyle he can give her, with terrible consequences for the man.

== Characters ==
The characters were given different names in the English translation. In the following list the names of the characters of the English translation are given first with the original names in parentheses.

- Albert Albinus (Bruno Kretschmar) - a wealthy middle-aged art-critic
- Margot Peters (Magda Peters) - a 17-year-old aspiring actress, common worker, model, seductress
- Axel Rex (Robert Gorn, probably Robert Horn) - A painter from New York and Margot's first lover, also Margot's first broken relationship when he abandoned her

Some minor characters include:

- Elisabeth Albinus (Anneliese Kretschmar) - Albert Albinus's wife
- Paul (Max) Hochenwart - Elisabeth's brother
- Otto Peters - Margot's brother
- Frieda - The Albinus' housekeeper
- Irma Albinus - Elisabeth and Albert's daughter
- Kaspar - A friend of Otto
- Udo Conrad (Dietrich von Siegelkranz) - An author and acquaintance of Albert's

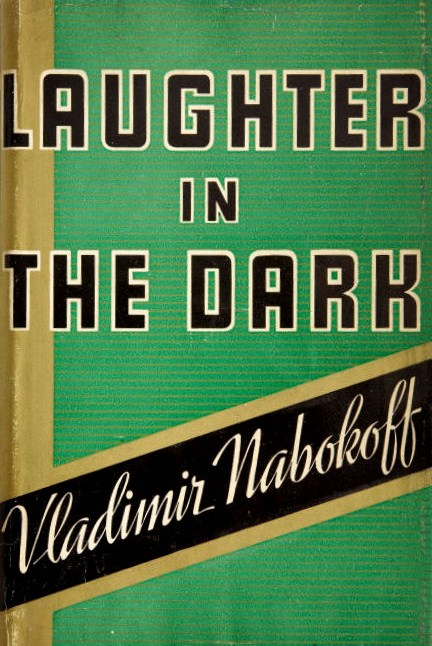
First US edition (1938)

== Plot ==
Albinus is a respected, reasonably happy married art critic who lives in Berlin. He lusts after the 17-year-old Margot whom he meets at a cinema, where she works, and woos her over the course of many encounters, primarily with money. His prolonged affair with Margot is eventually revealed to Albinus's wife Elisabeth when Margot deliberately sends a letter to the Albinuses' residence and Albinus is unable to intercept it before it is discovered. Elisabeth leaves with the assistance of her brother, Paul, and takes their daughter, Irma, with her. Rather than disown the young troublemaker, Albinus is even more attracted to Margot. She eventually manipulates him into allowing her to move in to his flat where he resided with his wife, and she sets to working on him getting a divorce so that she might marry him and secure access to his significant wealth. Even when Albinus' daughter, Irma, takes ill and eventually dies of pneumonia, Margot insistently drives a wedge between his old life and his new, in order to totalize her capture of him.

Albinus introduces Margot to Axel Rex at a dinner party, but he does not know the two have previously been lovers. Margot and Rex resume their relationship, and start plotting to get Albinus out of the way and rob him of his money.

Albinus gets Margot her first role as an actress, using his role as financial backer of the film to make up for her lack of talent. At the premiere of the movie, Margot realises how inept she was and is petulant about her public exposure as a mediocre actress. Attempting to appease her wounded ego, Albinus persuades her to take a holiday with the new car he has bought for her. Rex accompanies them as their chauffeur, given that Albinus can barely drive. By this point Rex has wangled his way into Albinus' confidence as a fellow artist, convincing Albinus that he could not possibly be interested in Margot by posing as a homosexual. Rex and Margot's trysts have become increasingly brazen, and the holiday seems an opportunity to further deepen their affair on Albinus' money.

The holiday doesn't go quite as Margot and Rex planned, since rendezvouses are next to impossible without arousing suspicion. On arriving in a small town and finding most lodgings unavailable, they finally get their chance at the only remaining hotel room the three can find, with a shared bathroom which makes clandestine access possible. After a chance encounter with an old friend in the town, Albinus realises that Margot and Rex are engaged in an affair. Enraged, Albinus returns to the hotel and threatens Margot, who insists that there is nothing between her and the allegedly homosexual Rex. Still distraught, Albinus demands they leave at once, and they abandon Rex at the hotel. On their journey out of town, Albinus crashes the car and is blinded, leaving him in need of care and oblivious to the world around him.

Rex and Margot take advantage of his handicap. After sending a letter falsely stating that Rex has gone to America, they rent a chalet in Switzerland where Rex poses as Albinus's doctor, although Albinus is unaware of Rex's presence. Rex mocks and tortures Albinus during his recovery. Albinus becomes increasingly suspicious as his ears become more attuned and he perceives someone's presence, although Margot continuously denies his concerns.

Paul, Albinus's brother-in-law, suspects foul play when he encounters multiple high value cheques on Albinus' account at their shared bank, with the signature scrawled and the amounts in a different handwriting. Rex and Margot have been draining Albinus's accounts and selling his property. Elisabeth, Albinus' estranged wife, asks her brother to drive to the Swiss residence. There, Paul discovers Rex toying with Albinus in his blinded state while Margot is out. Paul hurriedly bundles Albinus into a vehicle before Margot can return and convince the wretched Albinus otherwise, and escorts Albinus back to the Elisabeth's home, where he is given proper care.

After a short time, Albinus receives a call from the porter at his old original Berlin flat informing him that Margot has returned to his flat to collect some things. Finally knowing where she is, he decides to kill her. Without hesitation, he makes his way to the familiar flat and traps her inside by barricading the door, intending to shoot her with his pistol. He seeks her out by her scent and faint sounds, but when he tries to shoot her she overpowers him, grabs the pistol, and kills him.

== Film adaptations ==
In 1969, Laughter in the Dark was adapted for film directed by Tony Richardson, which was originally intended to star Richard Burton as Albinus. When he was fired for drunkenness, he was replaced by Nicol Williamson. Anna Karina played Margot and Jean-Claude Drouot played Axel Rex.

In December 2020, writer/director Scott Frank stated that he was developing a new adaptation of the novel, to star Anya Taylor-Joy as Margot.

== Literary reviews ==
- Camera Obscura and Laughter in the Dark, or The Confusion of Texts, by Christine Raguet-Bouvard (translated by Jeff Edwards)
- Nabokov's Poetics of Vision, or, What Anna Karenina is Doing in Kamera obskura by Thomas Seifrid.
