= Cloud, Castle, Lake =

Short story anthology by Vladimir Nabokov

- Author: Vladimir Nabokov
- Language: English
- Media type: Print
- ISBN: 0-14-102235-3

Cloud, Castle, Lake is a short story anthology by Vladimir Nabokov. It contains five stories: "The Admiralty Spire," "Razor," "A Russian Beauty," "Cloud, Castle, Lake," and "Signs and Symbols."
