= An Affair of Honor (short story) =

Short story

"An Affair of Honor" (originally titled "Podlets") is a short story by the novelist Vladimir Nabokov, first published in 1927.

== Plot ==
In the 1920s, Anton Petrovich, a Russian expatriate residing in Berlin, returns from a business trip to a distressing discovery: his wife has been unfaithful with a friend named Berg. Overwhelmed by anger, Anton confronts Berg, demanding he leave. He leaves a note for his unfaithful wife, instructing her to depart as well. Seeking solace, Anton confides in his friend Mityushin and another acquaintance, Gnuschke, revealing that he has challenged Berg to a duel. They agree to be his seconds, and arrangements for the duel, to be fought with pistols, are set in motion.

As the duel day approaches, Anton's fear intensifies; he realizes he lacks the skill to shoot. The night before the duel is sleepless for him. When his seconds arrive the next day, they take a train to the countryside, the chosen dueling ground. Along the way, they pause at a tavern for a glass of beer. Overwhelmed by anxiety, Anton unexpectedly flees and returns to Berlin.

In the aftermath, Anton, grappling with the consequences of his cowardice, seeks refuge in a seedy hotel. He perceives his world crumbling due to his own actions and imagines an alternate, happier ending to the episode. Yet, the reality of the situation weighs heavily on him, and he contemplates spending his days in the dismal confines of the hotel room, haunted by the repercussions of his choices.

== Analysis ==
"An Affair of Honour" unfolds in Nabokov's signature style, weaving a complex tapestry of irony and subversion around the traditional theme of duels prevalent in Russian literature. Originally titled "Podlets" ("The Cur" or "The Scoundrel"), the story centers on Anton Petrovich, an expatriate Russian in 1920s Berlin, who, upon discovering his wife's infidelity with Berg, challenges him to a duel. However, the narrative takes a sharply ironic turn as Anton, portrayed as clumsy, cowardly, and morally conventional, becomes the initiator of the duel—a grotesque inversion of the expected narrative.

Nabokov masterfully manipulates traditional tropes, infusing the story with dark humor and subverting conventional resolutions. Anton's choice of incompetent seconds, Mityushin and Gnushke, adds to the farcical elements, echoing Nabokov's penchant for grotesque duos. The story defies expectations as Anton, overwhelmed by fear and superstition, flees the impending duel, seeking refuge in a hotel room. The narrative's open-ended conclusion reflects Nabokov's departure from traditional plot resolutions, focusing instead on character revelation. Anton's descent into moral abyss becomes the true denouement, emphasizing Nabokov's ability to creatively reimagine and deconstruct familiar themes from Russian cultural history.
