= Speak, Memory =

Book by Vladimir Nabokov

- First UK edition
- Author: Vladimir Nabokov
- Language: English
- Publisher: Victor Gollancz (1951 UK)

Speak, Memory is a memoir by writer Vladimir Nabokov. The book includes individual essays published between 1936 and 1951 to create the first edition in 1951. Nabokov's revised and extended edition appeared in 1966.

Nabokov writes in the text that he was dissuaded from titling the book Speak, Mnemosyne by his publisher, who feared that readers would not buy a "book whose title they could not pronounce". It was first published in a single volume in 1951 as Speak, Memory in the United Kingdom and as Conclusive Evidence in the United States. The Russian version was published in 1954 and called Drugie berega (Other Shores). An extended edition including several photographs was published in 1966 as Speak, Memory: An Autobiography Revisited. In 1999 Alfred A. Knopf issued a new edition with the addition of a previously unpublished section titled "Chapter 16".

== Scope ==
The book is dedicated to his wife, Véra, and covers his life from 1903 until his emigration to America in 1940. The first twelve chapters describe Nabokov's remembrance of his youth in an aristocratic family living in pre-revolutionary Saint Petersburg and at their country estate Vyra, near Siverskaya. The three remaining chapters recall his years at Cambridge and as part of the Russian émigré community in Berlin and Paris. Through memory Nabokov is able to possess the past.

The cradle rocks above an abyss, and common sense tells us that our existence is but a brief crack of light between two eternities of darkness.

— Speak, Memory, the opening line

Nabokov published "Mademoiselle O", which became Chapter Five of the book, in French in 1936, and in English in The Atlantic Monthly in 1943, without indicating that it was non-fiction. Subsequent pieces of the autobiography were published as individual or collected stories, with each chapter able to stand on its own. Andrew Field observed that while Nabokov evoked the past through "puppets of memory" (in the characterizations of his educators, Colette, or Tamara, for example), his intimate family life with Véra and Dmitri remained "untouched". Field indicated that the chapter on butterflies is an interesting example of how the author deploys the fictional with the factual. It recounts, for example, how his first butterfly escapes at Vyra, in Russia, and is "overtaken and captured" forty years later on a butterfly hunt in Colorado.

The book's opening line, "The cradle rocks above an abyss, and common sense tells us that our existence is but a brief crack of light between two eternities of darkness," is arguably a paraphrase of Thomas Carlyle's "One Life; a little gleam of Time between two Eternities," found in Carlyle's 1840 lecture "The Hero as Man of Letters", published in On Heroes, Hero-Worship, and The Heroic in History in 1841. There is also a similar concept expressed in On the nature of things by the Roman Poet Lucretius. The line is parodied at the start of Little Wilson and Big God, the autobiography of the English writer Anthony Burgess. "If you require a sententious opening, here it is. Wedged as we are between two eternities of idleness, there is no excuse for being idle now."

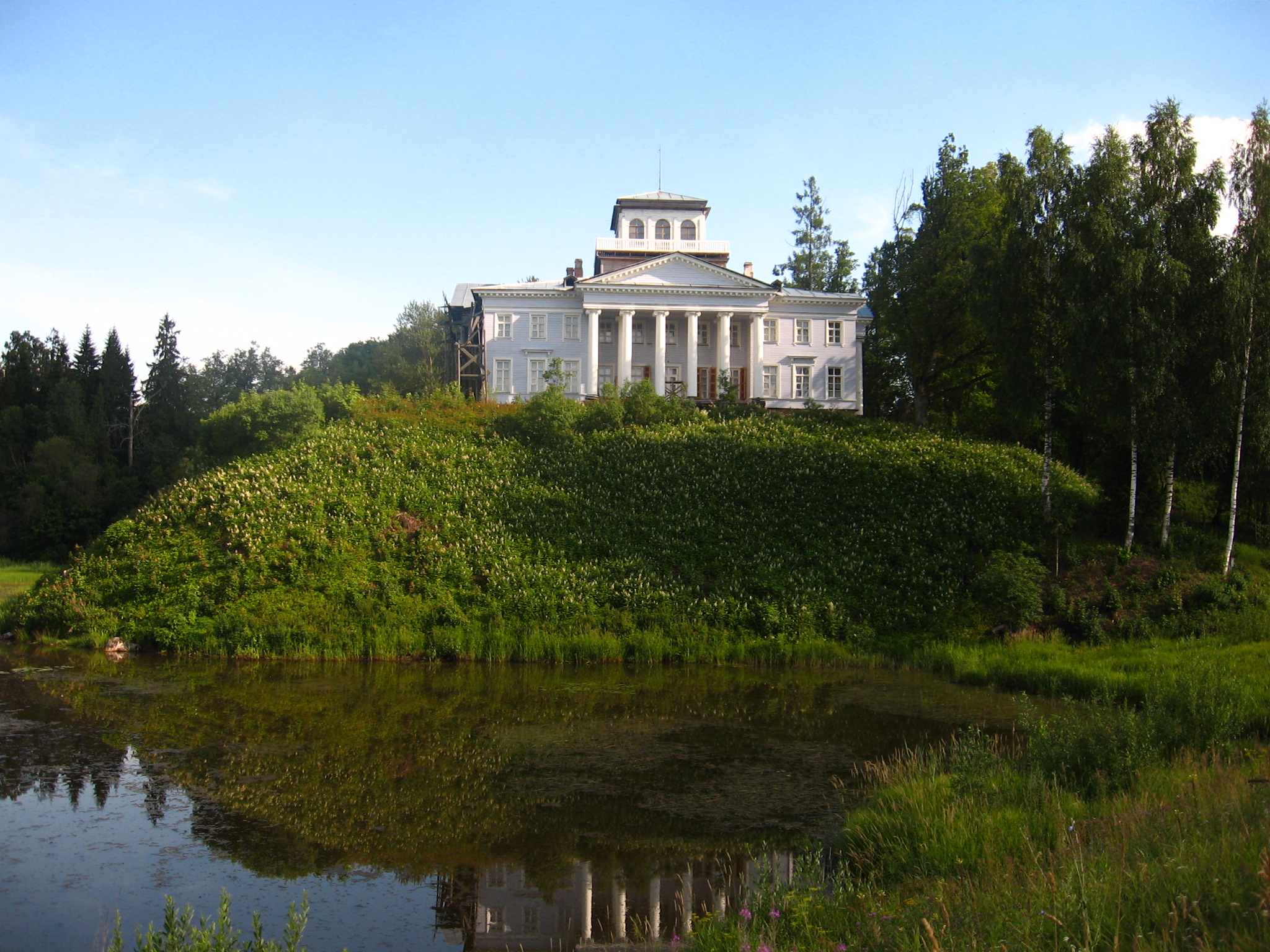
Nabokov inherited the Rozhdestveno mansion from his uncle in 1916

There are variations between the individually published chapters, the two English versions, and the Russian version. Nabokov, having lost his belongings in 1917, wrote from memory, and explains that certain reported details needed corrections; thus the individual chapters as published in magazines and the book versions differ. Also, the memoirs were adjusted to either the English- or Russian-speaking audience. It has been proposed that the ever-shifting text of his autobiography suggests that "reality" cannot be "possessed" by the reader, the "esteemed visitor", but only by Nabokov himself.

Nabokov had planned a sequel under the title Speak on, Memory or Speak, America. He wrote, however, a fictional autobiographic memoir of a double persona, Look at the Harlequins!, apparently being upset by a real biography published by Andrew Field.

== Chapters ==
The chapters were individually published as follows—in the New Yorker, unless otherwise indicated:

- "Perfect Past" (Chapter One), 1950, contains early childhood memories including the Russo-Japanese War.
- "Portrait of My Mother" (Chapter Two), 1949, also discusses his synesthesia.
- "Portrait of My Uncle" (Chapter Three), 1948, gives an account of his ancestors as well as his uncle "Ruka". Nabokov describes that in 1916 he inherited "what would amount nowadays to a couple of million dollars" and the estate Rozhdestveno, next to Vyra, from his uncle, but lost it all in the revolution.
- "My English Education" (Chapter Four), 1948, presents the houses at Vyra and St. Petersburg and some of his educators.
- "Mademoiselle O" (Chapter Five), published first in French in Mesures in 1936, portrays his French-speaking Swiss governess, Mademoiselle Cécile Miauton, who arrived in the winter of 1906. In English, it was first published in The Atlantic Monthly in 1943, and included in the Nine Stories collection (1947) as well as in Nabokov's Dozen (1958) and the posthumous The Stories of Vladimir Nabokov.
- "Butterflies" (Chapter Six), 1948, introduces a lifelong passion of Nabokov; first published in The New Yorker in 1948.
- "Colette" (Chapter Seven), 1948, remembers a 1909 family vacation at Biarritz where he met a nine-year-old girl whose real name was Claude Deprès. As "First Love" the story is also included in Nabokov's Dozen.
- "Lantern Slides" (Chapter Eight), 1950, recalls various educators and their methods.
- "My Russian Education" (Chapter Nine), 1948, depicts his father.
- "Curtain-Raiser" (Chapter Ten), 1949, describes the end of boyhood.
- "First Poem" (Chapter Eleven), 1949, published in Partisan Review, analyzes Nabokov's first attempt at poetry.
- "Tamara" (Chapter Twelve), 1949, describes a love affair that took place when he was sixteen, she fifteen. Her real name was Valentina Shulgina.
- "Lodgings in Trinity Lane" (Chapter Thirteen), 1951, published in Harper's Magazine, describes his time at Cambridge and talks about his brothers.
- "Exile" (Chapter Fourteen), 1951, published in Partisan Review, relates his life as an émigré and includes a chess problem.
- "Gardens and Parks" (Chapter Fifteen), 1950, is a recollection of their journey directed more personally to Véra.

== Reception ==
The book was instantly called a masterpiece by the literary world. In 2011, Time Magazine listed the book among the 100 All-TIME non-fiction books indicating that its "impressionist approach deepens the sense of memories relived through prose that is gorgeous, rich and full". Joseph Epstein lists Nabokov's book among the few truly great autobiographies. While he opines that it is odd that so great a writer as Nabokov has not been able to generate passion in his readers for his own greatest passion, chess and butterflies, he finds that the autobiography succeeds "at making a reasonable pass at understanding that greatest of all conundrums, its author's own life". Jonathan Yardley writes that the book is witty, funny and wise, "at heart it is … deeply humane and even old-fashioned", with an "astonishing prose". He indicates that while any autobiography is "inherently an act of immodesty", the real subject is the development of the inner and outer self, an act that can plunge the subject into "the abyss of self".

== See also ==
- Nabokov House
