= Signs and Symbols =

Short story by Vladimir Nabokov

"Signs and Symbols" is a short story by Vladimir Nabokov, written in English and first published, May 15, 1948 in The New Yorker and then in the collection Nabokov's Dozen (1958).

In The New Yorker, the story was published under the title "Symbols and Signs", a decision by the editor Katharine White. Nabokov returned the title to his original "Signs and Symbols" when republishing the story.

== Plot summary ==
An elderly couple tries to visit their mentally ill son in a sanatorium on his birthday. They are informed that he attempted to take his life and they cannot see him now. After their return home, the husband announces his decision to take him out of the sanatorium. The story concludes with mysterious telephone calls. The first two apparently misdialed calls are from a girl asking for "Charlie"; the story ends when the phone rings for the third time.

In the course of the story the reader learns many details of the unnamed couple's life: they are Russian Jews who went into exile after the revolution; depend financially upon the husband's brother, Isaac; had a German maid when they lived in Germany; had an aunt, Rosa, and many other relatives who were murdered in the Holocaust; and have a nephew who is a famous chess player. The elderly man is in bad health.

The son suffers from "referential mania", where "the patient imagines that everything happening around him is a veiled reference to his personality and existence". "Everything is a cipher and of everything he is the theme". Real people are excluded from this paranoia, and the condition is worse the further he is away from familiar surroundings. The son's condition is based on a real condition—compare ideas of reference.

== Textual changes ==
The New Yorker wanted to make many changes. Nabokov objected strongly, supported by his friend Edmund Wilson, and the story was printed mostly as he wrote it.

However, the New Yorker version still contained four editorial changes that Nabokov eliminated in later publications. One was that the title was reversed as mentioned above. The second was that instead of numbers for the three sections, the sections were separated by ellipses. The third was that two paragraphs were joined into one. The fourth was that "beech plum" for a kind of jelly was changed to the correct "beach plum". Alexander Drescher has argued that Nabokov intended the latter two points to be among the story's "signs and symbols". With his paragraphing, the story's sections have 7, 4, and 19 paragraphs, indicating the year it takes place, 1947. (Drescher credits this connection to Anthony Stadlen.) In the New Yorker version, the last section had 18 paragraphs. To support his claim that the connection to 1947 is intentional, Drescher notes that in Nabokov's novel Pnin (1957), Pnin complains that a librarian has changed volume 19 to volume 18 and gotten the wrong year in his request for a book from 1947, saying, "They can't read, these women! The year was plainly inscribed." Regarding "beech", Drescher argues that it is the husband's misreading of the label, "an example of typographical free indirect discourse," and is one of the story's many references to the Holocaust, specifically the Buchenwald concentration camp. Buchenwald means "beech woods", and Pnin thinks of "Buchenwald" and "beechwood" (for cremation) together.

== Interpretations ==
In a letter to Katharine White, Nabokov said that "Signs and Symbols", like "The Vane Sisters", was a story "wherein a second (main) story is woven into, or placed behind, the superficial semitransparent one." He did not say what the main story was.

Some critics have argued that the story's many details can be deciphered into a message—for instance that the son has committed suicide, or that he is in an afterlife and free from his torments, or that the third phone call is from him, saying that he has escaped from the asylum. However, the predominant interpretation is that the story inveigles the reader into an attempt at deciphering the details and thus "over-reading", which is "another, milder form of referential mania".

== See also ==
- Apophenia
