= That in Aleppo Once... =

- Short story by Vladimir Nabokov
- Genre: fiction

Publication
- Published in: Atlantic Monthly
- Publication date: 1943

"That in Aleppo Once..." is a short story written by Russian-born author Vladimir Nabokov (1899–1977). First published in Atlantic Monthly in 1943, the story takes epistolary form, with an unnamed narrator describing his recollections of himself and his wife's deteriorating relationship while fleeing German occupation during Case Anton. The narrator reveals to his correspondent the likelihood his wife was not real, examining this premise during the account of events.

== Background and publication ==
By 1940 Vladimir Nabokov had immigrated to the United States and began to formulate work within the native language. "That in Aleppo Once..." was the second of ten short stories the author would construct in English during this writing decade.

Some critics have pointed to Nabokov's own nomadic lifestyle and impetus for organization of his story ideas as self-determinative. Denoting such events within the confines of this story as "the gentle Germans roared into Paris" Nabokov foregrounds the conflict between the unnamed narrator against the heightened backdrop of the contemporary warfare of World War II during the time.

== Title ==
The title of Nabokov's short story is borrowed from Shakespeare's Othello in which the titular character is driven out of misguided jealousy and despair to murder his wife and lover with his own hands. Othello's decision to do so proves to be his undoing of his own sense of self and legacy. With a self-awareness of his ill-fate Othello closes out the play with the following lines before he commits suicide,

"...Set you down this,

And say besides that in Aleppo once,

Where a malignant and a turbaned Turk

Beat a Venetian and traduced the state,

I took by th' throat the circumcised dog

And smote him thus." (V.ii.349–354)

The narrator of Nabokov's short story has a similar revelation and seeks reprieval from his correspondent "V" of whom he asks to not dare title the rewriting of his own tragic story with the finality "That in Aleppo Once..." suggests. "V" appears to ignore this request as the reader is presented with the same letter "V" received with parallels to Shakespearean romance and tragedy.

== Plot summary ==
The story opens with an unknown narrator addressing a letter to someone referred to as "V". The narrator writes his letter from New York having obtained "V" 's address from a mutual acquaintance, Gleb Alexandrovich Gekko, who finds "V"'s writings to be anti-nationalist. Both "V" and the narrator are revealed to be Russian born immigrants who spent time together in France and the narrator recalls his literary excursions with "V" but admits he is no longer a poet. The narrator explains that after "V"'s departure from France he married a much younger woman. Although the narrator states he has papers to prove matrimony he is certain his wife was not a real entity and he is therefore "...able to speak of her with as much detachment as I would of a character in a story..." Due to the narrator's published criticism of Germany he admits attempting to expatriate from occupied France using his wife's relatives in New York but they never responded. Through other contacts, the narrator reveals he was able secure passage towards Paris to await the necessary papers for full departure to the United States. The narrator and his wife depart and travel by train across the country, spending their honeymoon witnessing refugees and destitution. During this period the narrator's wife laments what conditions their dog would have to endure should they have bought a dog and left that dog behind to face its own death. Traveling to Nice by railway the narrator is separated from his wife when he briefly departs at a stop for food, having both tickets with him. Unable to locate his wife the narrator decides to travel to the following stop in Montpellier sending telegrams for her hoping he will find her having traveled ahead to their destination. After arriving in Nice the narrator receives little help from police as he reflects on his misfortune in comparison to the stories he hears concerning people of Jewish descent from his fellow Russian immigrants. A week passes and the narrator discovers his wife by chance at a nearby market. His wife explains she sought help from the Commissariat and a few elderly women refugees who provided the means to reach her and her husband's destination. Soon after the wife changes her story during an intimate moment to reveal she spent her time with another man in Montpellier with whom she had relations with. The narrator demands to be given every detail of her memories during the days that follow while awaiting paperwork that will allow for escape from the country. His wife states while upset that it is possible she did not do it, it is possible that she did it to test him, and it is possible there is a multiplicity in her experience.

The narrator forces himself to accept the first explanation for her time spent apart. The narrator and his wife's relationship remains strained after this. The day he manages to secure passage for a boat out of France from Marseilles his wife goes missing. To discover where his wife went the narrator meets with the Russian immigrant families he and his wife associated with. Out of these, an elderly woman named Anna Vladimirovna confronts the narrator with the accusations circulated by his wife. The narrator's wife told others her husband would not allow divorce despite having met a French man whom she loved passionately and who could provide better means for her. The narrator also is accused by his wife of hanging the dog they never owned with his own hands. Faced with abandonment, the narrator decides to board the ship departing Marseilles. On the fourth day at sea the narrator meets an elderly doctor who asks him about his wife. The narrator denies having traveled with anyone yet the doctor explains he saw her walking the shore of the port in Marseilles waiting for her husband to collect her. The narrator states this is when a certainty arrived that she did not exist. The narrator arrives in New York and determines the address of his wife's relatives is an empty lot between buildings. The narrator closes his letter by appealing to "V" to rewrite and elevate these events into art. The narrator tries to suggest life will become real again for him one day but he remains haunted by her wandering that shore. The narrator asks "V" to not use his assertion that "It may all end in Aleppo" as a title for his sake.

== Allusions ==
A mixture of references have been observed within "That in Aleppo Once..." including Arthur Conan Doyle's Sherlock Holmes, Nabokov's narrator as perceiving themselves to be like the woman in Chekhov's short story "The Lady with the Dog," Shakespeare's Othello, and writer Alexander Pushkin's relationship with his wife Nathalia of whom Nabokov's narrator references as "Nalthalie" in certain situational likeness to his marriage with his young unnamed wife. Pushkin believed his wife to be in an affair with a Cassio-like man, Georges d' Anthes, by including these references Nabokov provides a sense of connection between reality and imagination. Professor Brian Quinn of Kyushu University connects Russian Literary Tradition being evoked by Nabokov as a part of subverting art's highest recognitions against the harsh realities of poverty, death, and exile that surreally form an 'other' or as recognized, 'virtual reality' departure understood of twentieth century experience.
