= The Gift (Nabokov novel) =

1938 novel by Vladimir Nabokov

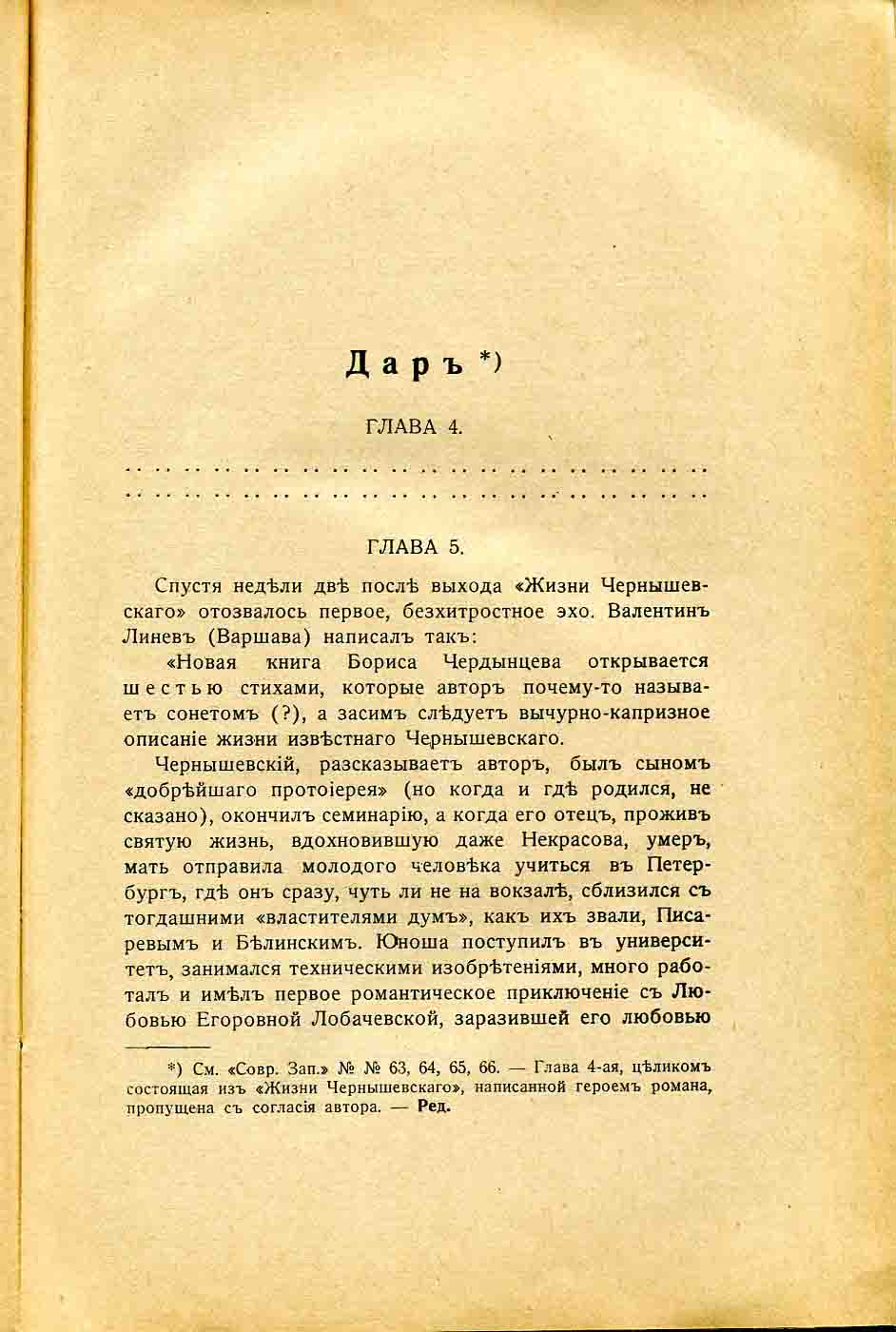
- First publication in Sovremennye zapiski with the fourth chapter cut out
- Author: Vladimir Nabokov
- Original title: Дар
- Translator: Dmitri Nabokov, Michael Scammell, Vladimir Nabokov
- Language: Russian
- Genre: Metafiction
- Publisher: Sovremennye zapiski (serial)
- Publication date: 1938
- Publication place: Germany / France
- English publication date: 1961

The Gift (Russian: Дар, romanized: Dar) is Vladimir Nabokov's final Russian novel, and is considered to be his farewell to the world he was leaving behind. Nabokov wrote it between 1935 and 1937 while living in Berlin, and it was published in serial form in 1938 under his pen name, Vladimir Sirin.

The Gift's fourth chapter, a pseudo-biography of the Russian writer Nikolay Chernyshevsky, was censored from publication in the Russian émigré journal Sovremennye zapiski that published the book's four other chapters.

The story's apparent protagonist is Fyodor Godunov-Cherdyntsev, a Russian writer living in Berlin after his family fled the Bolshevik Revolution. Fyodor's literary ambitions and his development as a writer shape the book. In the fifth and final chapter, Fyodor states his ambition to write a book that in description is very similar to The Gift. In an interview to BBC2, Nabokov cited Fyodor as an example that not all the lives of his characters are grotesque or tragic; he said that Fyodor "is blessed with a faithful love and an early recognition of his genius".

It is possible to interpret the book as metafiction and imagine that the book was actually written by Fyodor later in his life, though this is not the only possible interpretation.

Nabokov's son, Dmitri, translated the book's first chapter into English; Michael Scammell completed the rest. Nabokov then revised the translations of all five chapters in 1961.

== Plot ==
=== Chapter one ===
Fyodor Konstantinovitch Cherdyntsev (in the Russian version the main character is called Fyodor Konstantinovitch Godunov-Cherdyntsev; the first part of the name refers to Pushkin's play Boris Godunov) is a Russian émigré living in Berlin in the 1920s, and the chapter starts with him moving to a boarding-house on Seven Tannenberg Street. He has recently published a book of poems and receives a call from Alexander Yakovlevich Chernyshevski congratulating him on the poems and inviting him to come over to a party to read a favorable critique in a newspaper. The poems reach back to Fyodor's childhood, which he spent with his sister Tanya in pre-revolutionary St. Petersburg and the Leshino manor, the country estate of the Godunov-Cherdyntsevs. Fyodor arrives at the party only to learn that he has fallen victim to a crude April fool's joke; his book has not received any attention at all in the press. The Chernyshevskis had a son, Yasha, who looked like Fyodor and loved poetry. Yasha took his own life when he was caught in a tragic love triangle. Yasha's mother wants Fyodor to use Yasha's tragic end in his writings, but he declines. As a result of Yasha's death, his father suffers episodes of insanity. When Fyodor returns to his "new hole", he realises that he has brought the wrong keys with him, but after he waits a while, a visitor comes out, and Fyodor gets back in. Fyodor dawdles away the summer. In the fall he attends a literary meeting of Russian émigrés and meets Koncheyev, whom he considers a rival. A reading of a new play bores the audience. When Fyodor is about to leave, he and Koncheyev discuss Russian literature at length and with great animation, but their discussion turns out to have been largely fictitious.

=== Chapter two ===
Fyodor is dreaming about his native Russia as he rides in a tramcar to visit his language student, but he can no longer stand it and returns to his lodgings. When his mother, Elizaveta Pavlovna, comes from Paris to visit him, the shadow of his lost father hangs over their encounter, for his mother believes that her husband is still alive. Before her departure they attend a local Russian literary event, and Fyodor is the last poet there to recite one of his poems. Although almost unnoticed, he is inspired by his mother's visit and by his study of Pushkin, and he seeks her support for his new project, a book about his father, Konstantin Kirillovich. He collects material, stumbles upon Sushoshchokov's account of his grandfather, Kirill Ilyich, a gambler who made and lost a fortune in America before returning to Russia, and he starts to focus on his father's activities as an explorer, lepidopterist, and scientific writer, whose journeys between 1885 and 1918 led him to Siberia and Central Asia. Fyodor had only come along with his father on local trips, but he is imbued with the love of butterflies and imagines accompanying his father in his journeys to the East. In 1916 his father departed for his last journey and remains missing. Fyodor's difficulty with his project is complicated by his need to find a new lodging. With the help of Mrs. Chernyshevski he finds a place with the Shchyogolevs. He moves in with them because he sees a short, pale-blue dress in an adjacent room and assumes that it belongs to their daughter.

=== Chapter three ===
This chapter starts by describing a day in the life of the protagonist. In the morning Fyodor hears the Shchyogolevs get up and he begins the day by thinking about poetry. He reflects on his development as a poet. At mid-day he joins the family for lunch. Shchyogolev is talking about politics, his wife, Marianna Nikolavna, is cooking, and Marianna's daughter, Zina Mertz, is behaving in a distinctly hostile manner. In the afternoon Fyodor gives his tutorial lessons and visits a bookstore, where he comes across Koncheyev's book of poems Communication and some reviews that failed to understand it. He also reads an article about Chernyshevski and Chess in the Soviet chess magazine 8x8 and afterwards visits his editor, Vasiliev. After returning home and having supper in his room, Fyodor goes out to meet Zina in secret. While waiting for her he composes a poem embedded in the narrative. Zina Mertz has already appeared in the narrative – she bought one of the few copies of Fyodor's poems, and she is the daughter of Marianna Nikolavna and Shchyogolev's stepdaughter, occupying the room next to Fyodor's. The story of their encounters is recalled, and we learn that Zina knew of Fyodor when he lived at his previous lodgings. Their meetings are held in secret and hidden from her parents. Shchyogolev implies that he married her mother to gain access to Zina, and this may be the reason why she hates him. Zina works for a law firm, Traum, Baum & Kaesebier. Fyodor gets more involved with Chernyshevski's work and declares that he wants to write about him for "firing practice". He reads everything written by and about him, and he passes from "accumulation to creation". Zina is Fyodor's muse and reader. The first publisher to whom Fyodor submits his manuscript rejects it as a "reckless, antisocial, mischievous improvisation". But Fyodor has better luck with another publisher.

=== Chapter four ===
This chapter, a book within a book, titled "The Life of Chernyshevski", is Fyodor's critical biography of the 19th-century Russian writer Chernyshevski. Fyodor ridicules Chernyshevski's aesthetics and his understanding of literature.

=== Chapter five ===
The book about Chernyshevski finds itself in a "good, thundery atmosphere of scandal which helped sales". Most reviews in the literary world of the émigrés are critical, as the book debunks its subject as a writer and thinker; Koncheyev's review, however, is quite positive. Fyodor is unable to show the book to Alexander Yakovlevich Chernyshevski, who recently died. His death and funeral are described. On his way home, Fyodor walks with the writer Shirin, "a deaf and blind man with blocked nostrils". Shirin tries to engage Fyodor in the activities of the Committee of the Society of Russian Writers in Germany. Fyodor declines but attends some meetings observing the infighting for control of the society. Shchyogolev is offered a job in Copenhagen and plans to leave Zina in the Berlin apartment. Fyodor is elated and takes a walk in the Grunewald forest, where he imagines to have a talk with Koncheyev. His clothes, including the key to the apartment, are stolen, and he has to return in his bathing trunks. At night he dreams that his father has come back. Next morning the Shchyogolevs leave for Copenhagen, and Zina stays behind. Fyodor, who is planning to write a "classical novel" (The Gift), and Zina can now live together. They are without money, both at the moment have lost the key to their apartment, but they are happy, they feel that fate brought them together, and Zina declares that he will be “a writer as has never been before“.

== Background ==
First complete edition (1952)

The Gift is the last novel written by Nabokov in his native language. In the 1962 foreword, he indicates that it was written between 1935 and 1937 in Berlin, with the last chapter completed on the French Riviera in 1937. The novel was first published serially in the Parisian émigré magazine Sovremennye zapiski; however, chapter four was rejected: ”a pretty example of life finding itself obliged to imitate the very art it condemns”. The complete novel was not published until 1952.

== Author's comments ==
=== 1962 foreword ===
Despite the many parallels, Nabokov tells the reader not to confuse "the designer with the design", insisting that he is not Fyodor, his father not an explorer of Asia, and he "never wooed Zina Mertz". Fyodor's disdain for Germany may have been influenced by the "nauseous dictatorship" Nabokov experienced when writing. The novel evokes the close-knit and short-lived world of Russian émigré writers in post-World War I Europe, notably Berlin, a "phantasm" when Nabokov wrote his foreword where he indicates:

[The Gift's] heroine is not Zina, but Russian literature. The plot of Chapter One centres in Fyodor's poems. Chapter Two is a surge toward Pushkin in Fyodor's literary progress and contains his attempt to describe his father's zoological explorations. Chapter Three shifts to Gogol, but its real hub is the love poem dedicated to Zina. Fyodor's book on Chernyshevski, a spiral within a sonnet, takes care of Chapter Four. The last chapter combines all the preceding themes and adumbrates the book Fyodor dreams of writing someday: The Gift.

— Vladimir Nabokov, from the Foreword

=== Father's Butterflies ===
Nabokov's "Father's Butterflies" is viewed as a later written afterword to The Gift. It was translated by his son and published posthumously, incorporated as a chapter into Nabokov's Butterflies.

== Reception ==
The Gift is considered by some "the most original, unusual and interesting piece of prose writing" of Russian emigre writing (Simon Karlinsky) and the most "difficult" of Nabokov's Russian novels. Initially the complex novel was not successfully received; it was either ignored or criticized as an incendiary attack on Russian literature. Earlier critics viewed it as a novel describing the development of an artist. Dolinin, instead, sees it as "a kind of declaration of love" – love of the creator for his creature, and of the creature for its creator, love of a son for his father, love of an exile for his native land, love for language and those who love it, love for the beauty of the world, and, last but not least, love for its readers". Johnson maintains that the theme of The Gift is the gift of art that is played out, like a chess game, along two plot lines – Fyodor's artistic development and his relationship to Zina. The role of keys in the novel acts as a leitmotif. Many other motifs are present, including time, reality, nature, love, parents, Russia, literature, art, death, light, colors, dreams, travel, and exile. The novel contains embedded literature such as poems and the paradox of a "real" biography by an "unreal" writer. The narration weaves between first and third person, time between now and past, and dreams have the quality of reality. The novel is written in a circular fashion, like a Möbius strip (Dolinin), at its end the narrator/protagonist decides to write the novel the reader is reading. Ben-Amos analyzed the role of literature in the novel, stating that it is "a central component, rather than a reflection, of reality", consistent with Fyodor being both narrator and protagonist, also the love of Zina and Fyodor is inter-related to literature and unthinkable without it. Similarly, Paperno indicates that literature and reality interact on equal footing and are interchangeable. Another angle is provided by Boyd, who suggests that The Gift depicts Fyodor's father's life as a thesis "not quite yet earned", the life of Chernishevsky – a life of frustration – its Hegelian antithesis, and Fyodor's life as it plays out the synthesis: Fyodor realizes that his past frustrations are part of a larger design to link him to Zina and to develop his art.

Each chapter follows the style of a figure of Russian literature. There is a chapter written in Pushkin's style, one in Gogol's style, and the fourth chapter is in the style of Russian satirist Mikhail Saltykov-Shchedrin.

== General and cited references ==
- Stephen H. Blackwell Boundaries of Art in Nabokov's The Gift: Reading as Transcendence Slavic Review, Vol. 58, No. 3 (Autumn, 1999), pp. 600–625.
- Салиева Л. К. Риторика "Дара" Набокова. Реконструкция изобретения. М.: Флинта:Наука, 2005. – 136 с. (Salieva, L. K. "Rhetoric of Nabokov's 'The Gift'").
- Салиева Л. К. Риторика романа Владимира Набокова "Дар". Фигура мысли. М., МГУ, 2012.
- David Vernon, Ada to Zembla: The Novels of Vladimir Nabokov (Edinburgh: Endellion Press, 2022).
