= Carousel (disambiguation) =

A carousel is an amusement ride.

Carousel or carrousel may also refer to:

== Arts, entertainment, and media ==
=== Stage productions ===
- Carousel (ballet) or Carousel (A Dance), a ballet by Christopher Wheeldon
- Carousel (musical), a 1945 Rodgers and Hammerstein musical
- Carousel (comics), a multimedia comics slide show by Robert Sikoryak

=== Films ===
- Carousel (1923 film), a Swedish film by Dimitri Buchowetzki
- Carousel (1937 film), a German film starring Marika Röck
- Carousel (1956 film), a 1956 film by Henry King adapted from the 1945 Rodgers and Hammerstein stage musical
- Carousel (1967 film), a made-for-television film adapted from the 1945 Rodgers and Hammerstein stage musical
- Carousel (2023 film), a Swedish horror film
- Carousel (2026 film), an American romantic drama starring Chris Pine and Jenny Slate

=== Music ===
==== Groups ====
- Carousel (band), represented Latvia at Eurovision 2019
- Carrousel (band), a French-Swiss band that tried to represent Switzerland at Eurovision 2013

==== Albums ====
- Carousel (original Broadway cast recording), 1945
- Carousel (Leila K album), 1993
- Carousel (Marcia Griffiths album), 1990
- Carousel (Will Hoge album), 2001
- Carousel (Wizex album), 1978
- Carousel, by Subcircus, 1996
- Carrousel (album), by Enanitos Verdes, 1988

==== Songs ====
- "Carousel" (Blink-182 song), 1994
- "Carousel" (Melanie Martinez song), 2014
- "Carousel" (Travis Scott song), 2018
- "Carousel", by 5 Seconds Of Summer from 5SOS5, 2022
- "Carousel", by Flobots from Noenemies, 2017
- "Carousel", by Haken from Virus, 2020
- "Carousel", by Iron & Wine from The Shepherd's Dog, 2007
- "Carousel", by Laufey from A Matter of Time, 2025
- "Carousel", by Linkin Park from Hybrid Theory, 1999
- "Carousel", by Michael Jackson from the 2001 special edition reissue of Thriller, 2001
- "Carousel", by Vanessa Carlton from Rabbits on the Run, 2011
- "Carousel", by Vibe Tribe from Wise Cracks, 2006
- "Carousel", by Jean-Michel Blais from Aubades, 2022
- "Carousel", by Hatchie from Liquorice, 2025

=== Television ===
- Carousel (TV channel), a Russian television channel

==== Episodes ====
- "Carousel", Dallas (1978) season 12, episode 1 (1988)
- "Carousel", Dynasty (1981) season 4, episode 11 (1983)
- "Carousel", Law & Order: Special Victims Unit season 25, episode 6 (2024)
- "Carousel", Logan's Run episode 11 (1978)
- "Carousel", Teletubbies series 3, episode 23 (1999)
- "Carousel", Uki series 1, episode 30 (2010)
- "The Carousel", The Deep End (2022) episode 3 (2022)
- "The Carousel", The Waltons season 9, episode 11 (1981)

=== Other arts, entertainment, and media ===
- Carousel (advertisement), a 2009 advertisement for Philips LCD televisions
- Carrousel (booklet), three short texts written by Vladimir Nabokov
- Carrousel, a fictional ritual in Logan's Run
- Carousel (Sea World), a ride at Nickelodeon Land, Gold Coast, Australia
- Le Carrousel, a Parisian cabaret

== Technology ==
- Baggage carousel, a device for delivering passengers' luggage
- Carousel slide projector, a slideshow projector with a rotary tray
- Data and object carousel, a round-robin broadcast transmission scheme

== Other uses ==
- Caracciola Karussell or The Carousel, a banked corner section of the Nürburgring race track
- Carousel Buses, a bus company in High Wycombe, England
- Carousel Mall, a shopping mall in San Bernardino, California
- Carousel Shopping Center, a shopping mall in Istanbul, Turkey
- Maki Carrousel (born 1942), Japanese actor
- Carousel fraud, a type of missing trader fraud
- Carousel voting, a method of vote rigging
- Ice carousel, a human-made rotating circular piece of ice cut from floating ice sheets within larger bodies of water
- Rambler Carrousel, a show car by American Motors Corporation
- Roundabout (play), a type of playground equipment
- Swing carousel, an amusement ride in which seats are suspended from a rotating top
- Westfield Carousel, a shopping centre in Cannington, Western Australia

== See also ==
- Carousel Theater (disambiguation)
- Carousell (disambiguation)
- Carrusel, a Mexican telenovela
  - Carrossel, the Brazilian remake
- Carrossel (album), by Skank (2006)
- Merry-Go-Round (disambiguation)
