= Ojo =

Ojo may refer to:

- Ōjō, a Japanese Buddhist term referring to rebirth in the Pure Land of Amitabha Buddha
- Ojo (newspaper), a Peruvian newspaper
- Ojo (comic), a comic book series by Sam Kieth
- Ojo, Lagos State, a local government area in Nigeria
- Ojo, a Yoruba preordained name
- Ojo (surname)
- Ojo the Lucky, an Oz book series character
- Ojo, a bear cub in Bear in the Big Blue House
- El Ojo, a floating island in Argentina
