= Flat coast =

Shoreline where the land descends gradually into the sea

Schematic diagram of a flat coast.

At a flat coast or flat shoreline, the land descends gradually into the sea. Flat coasts can be formed either as a result of the sea advancing into gently sloping terrain or through the abrasion of loose rock. They may be basically divided into two parallel strips: the shoreface and the beach.

Flat coasts consist of loose material such as sand and gravel. Wind transports finer grains of sand inland over the dunes. The sea washes pebbles and sand away from the coast and dumps it at other locations.

== Flat coast littoral series ==
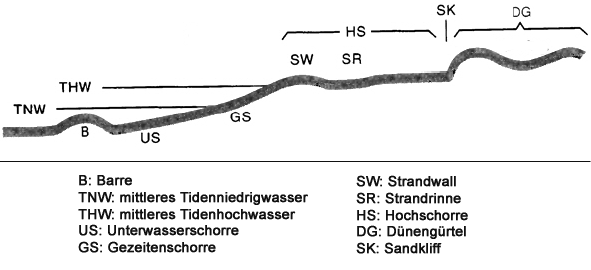
Diagram of a flat coast littoral series. Key: B: bar, TNW: average low tide, THW: average high tide, US: shoreface; GS: foreshore, SW: berm, SR: runnel, HS: backshore, DG: dune belt, SK: dune cliff

The typical sequence of landforms created by the sea is described as a "littoral series".

=== Sandbars, runnels and creeks ===
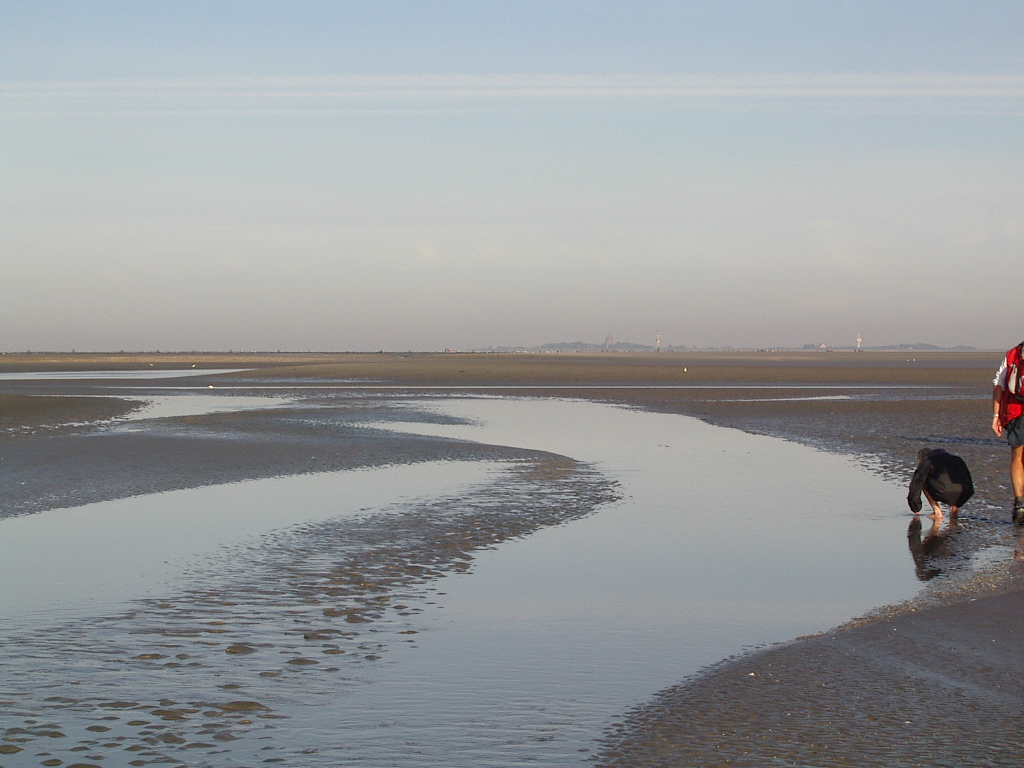
Wadden creek with exposed sandbar during an ebb tide

The littoral series of a flat coast starts in the permanently flooded shallow water region, or shoreface, with a sand or gravel reef (also called a bar). The longshore bar is an elongated ridge of sand found parallel to the shore in the surf zone on many flat coasts. It consists mainly of sand or gravel, depending on the material available along the coast. The sides of the sandbar fall gently away. The basin between a sandbar and the shore zone is called the runnel or swale. The presence of a bar clearly indicates that the movement of waves is transporting and depositing material on the seabed. There may be several bars whose longitudinal axes all run parallel to the beach and which are separated by equally parallel runnels or creeks. The drainage troughs in areas of tidal flats also run parallel to the coast.

=== Shoreface and beach ===
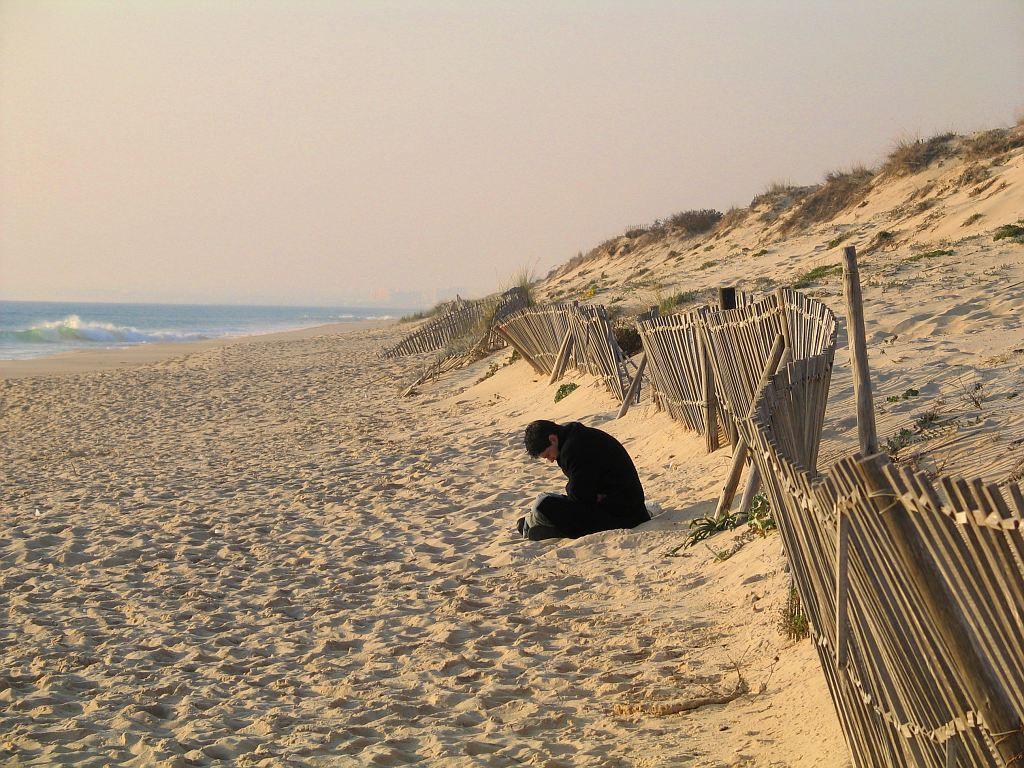
Start of the dune belt by the sand cliff

The shoreface (or underwater platform) on flat coasts encompasses in its narrow sense that area which is subject to the constant action of moving water. This means that the landward boundary between shoreface and beach is the line of the average low-water mark. However this definition is not universal and frequently varies from author to author in the literature. Whilst some define the beach as the landward transition to the shoreface that extends from the low-water mark to the highest high-water mark, i.e. the zone that is only periodically or episodically (after a storm surge) flooded by water; other authors do not use the term "beach" for the landward element of a flat coast at all. They describe the region between the mean low-water mark and the mean high-water mark of the tides as the intertidal zone or foreshore and that area above the average high-water mark as the supratidal zone or backshore that is only directly attacked by water during storms. Because the backshore is often considerably flatter in appearance than the foreshore, which slopes clearly down towards the sea, it is also often referred to as a beach platform, which is why this part of the shore can be considered in practice to be the actual beach. The farthest point inland that is reached by storm surges is bounded by a belt of dunes, where floods can form a dune cliff.

=== Berm ===
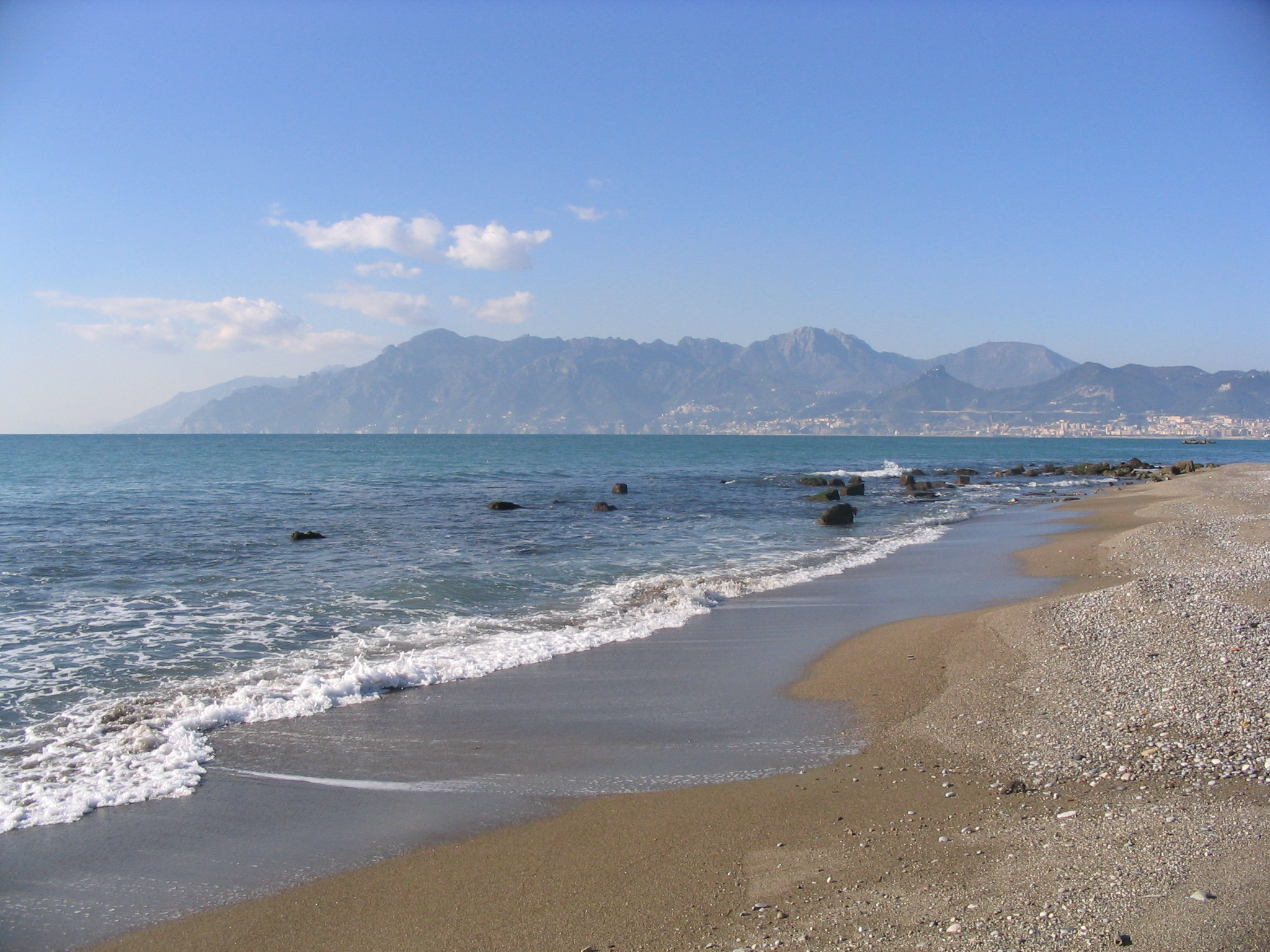
The berm: where the gravel is no longer washed back into the sea by the backwash

On the beach (the beach platform) there is very often a bank of sand or a gravel ridge parallel to the shoreline and a few tens of centimetres high, known as the berm. On its landward side there is often a shallow runnel. The berm is formed by material transported by the breaking waves that is thrown beyond the average level of the sea. The coarse-grained material that can no longer be washed away by the backwash remains behind. The location and size of the berm is subject to seasonal changes. For example, a winter berm that has been thrown up by storm surges in winter is usually much more prominent and higher up the beach than berms formed by summer high tides.

A similar landform is a beach ridge.

== Beach losses and gains ==
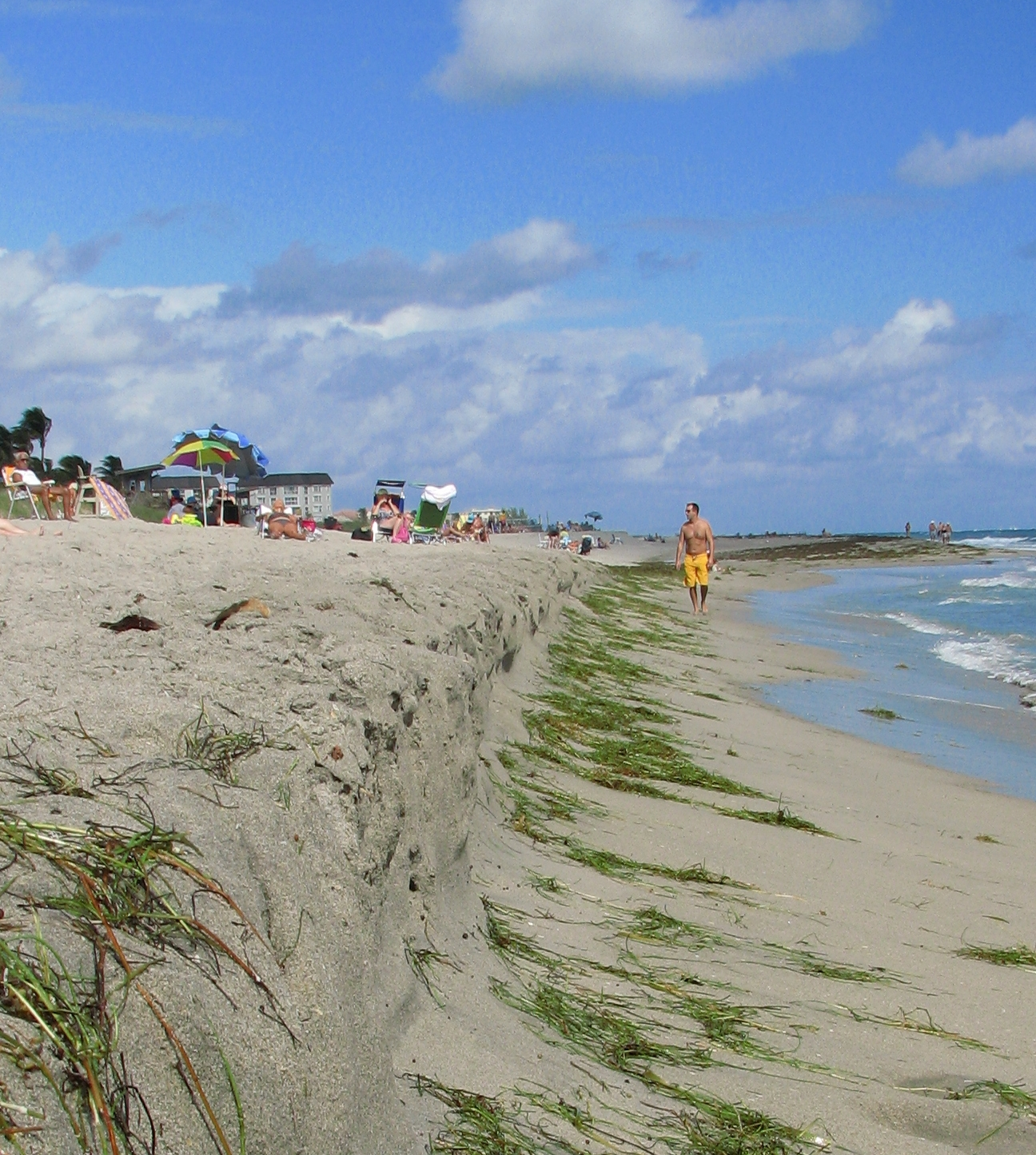
Beach losses after a hurricane

Beaches are usually heavily eroded during storm surges and the beach profile steepened, whereas normal wave action on flat coasts tends to raise the beach. Not infrequently a whole series of parallel berms is formed, one behind the other. There is a consequent gradual increase in height with the result that, over time, the shoreline advances seawards. A striking example of land-forming system of berms is Skagen Odde on the northern tip of Vendsyssel in the extreme north of Denmark. This headland is still growing today as more berms are added.

Coastal defences against erosion are groynes, stone walls, or tetrapods of concrete, which act as breakwaters. The first plants to colonise the dunes include sea buckthorn or beach grass which prevent wind erosion.

== Literature ==
- Klaus Duphorn et al.: Die deutsche Ostseeküste. Sammlung geologischer Führer, Vol. 88, 281 p., numerous diagrams and maps, Bornträger, Berlin, 1995
- Heinz Klug, Horst Sterr, Dieter Boedecker: Die deutsche Ostseeküste zwischen Kiel und Flensburg. Morphologischer Charakter und rezente Entwicklung. Geographische Rundschau 5, p. 6–14. Brunswick, 1988
- Harald Zepp: Grundriss Allgemeine Geographie – Geomorphologie. UTB 2008, ISBN 3-8252-2164-4
- Frank Ahnert: Einführung in die Geomorphologie. UTB 2003, ISBN 3-8252-8103-5
