= Parc de l'Étang =

Private park with botanical garden and arboretum in Franche-Comté, France

Coordinates: 47.4294°N 5.6378°E

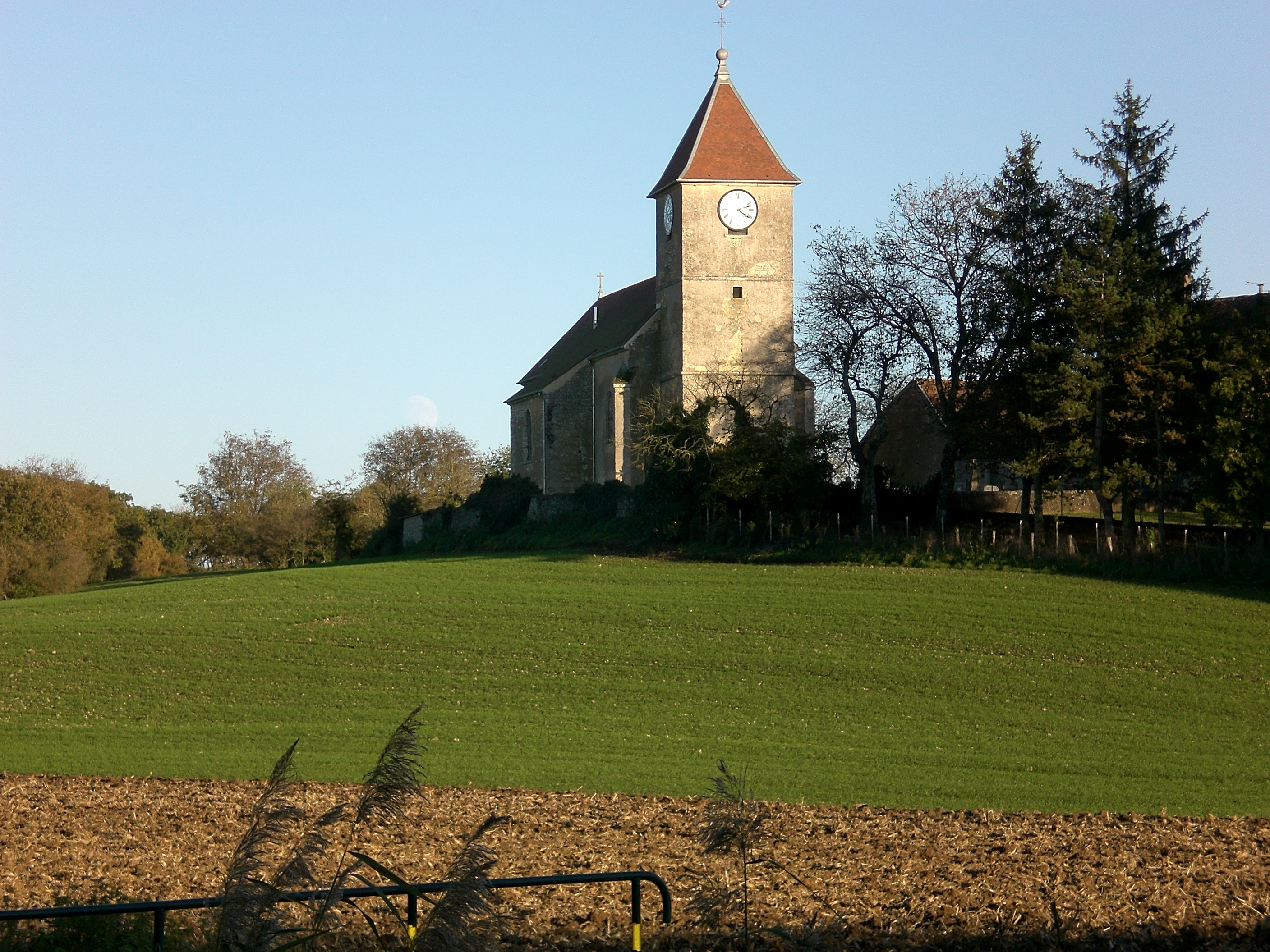
Church of Battrans

The Parc de l'Étang (3 hectares) is a private park with botanical garden and arboretum located on rue des Longeots, Battrans, Haute-Saône, Franche-Comté, France. It is open by appointment daily except Sunday in the warmer months; an admission fee is charged.

The park was begun in 1971 with creation of a pond; the excavated soil was fashioned into surrounding berms, hills, and terraces. Most plantings were completed 1972–1973, although subsequent plantings have been required to repair windstorm and disease damage. In 2005 it was designated a Jardin Remarquable by the French Ministry of Culture. Today the park contains a landscaped arboretum containing nearly 350 varieties of trees and shrubs, set with gravel paths and walkways.

== See also ==
- List of botanical gardens in France
- Remarkable Gardens of France (Jardin Remarquables)
