= Ice circle =

Rotating slab of ice on slow-moving water

Ice disk on Vigala river (Estonia) filmed by a drone, January 2019.

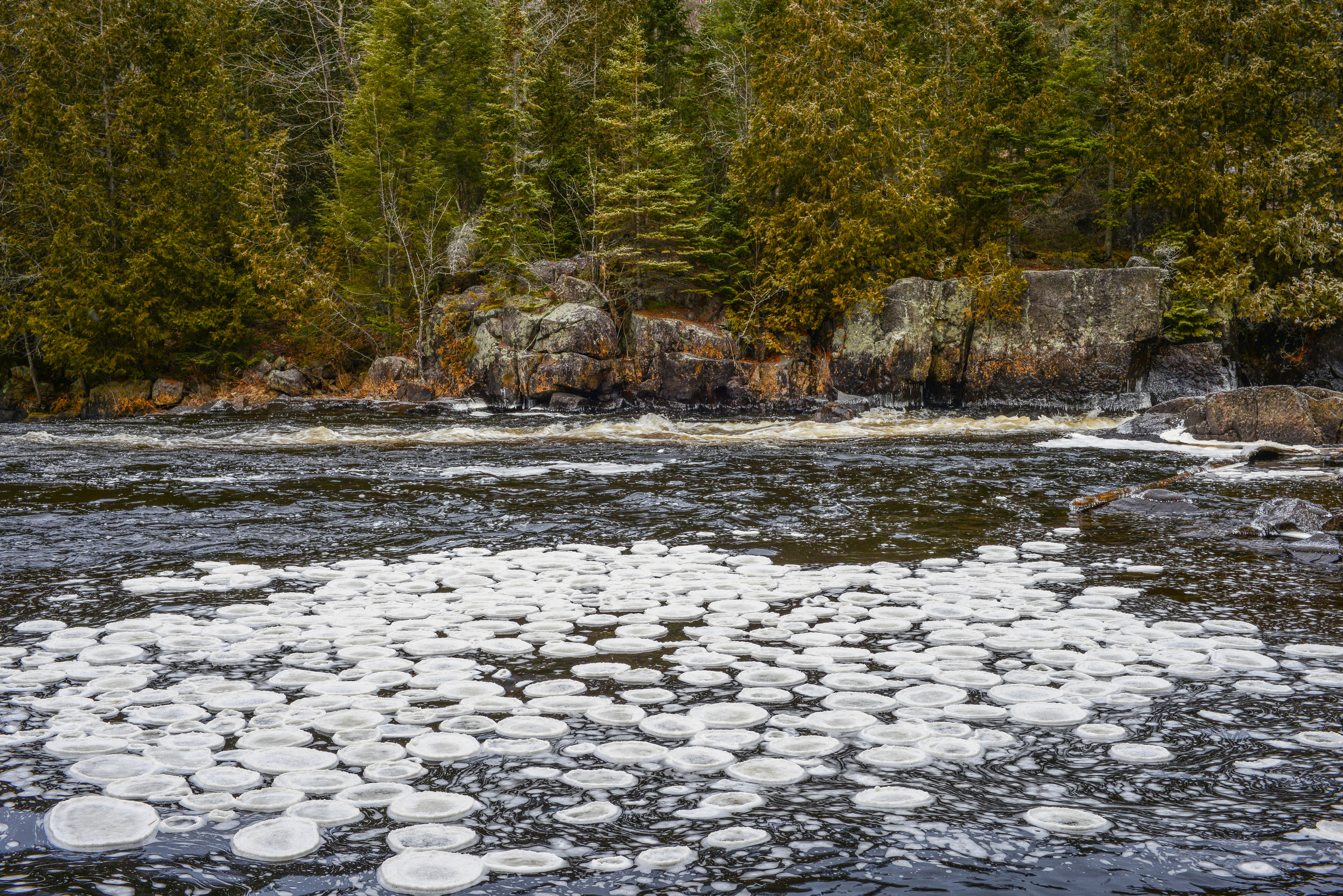
Ice circles on the Doncaster River, Quebec

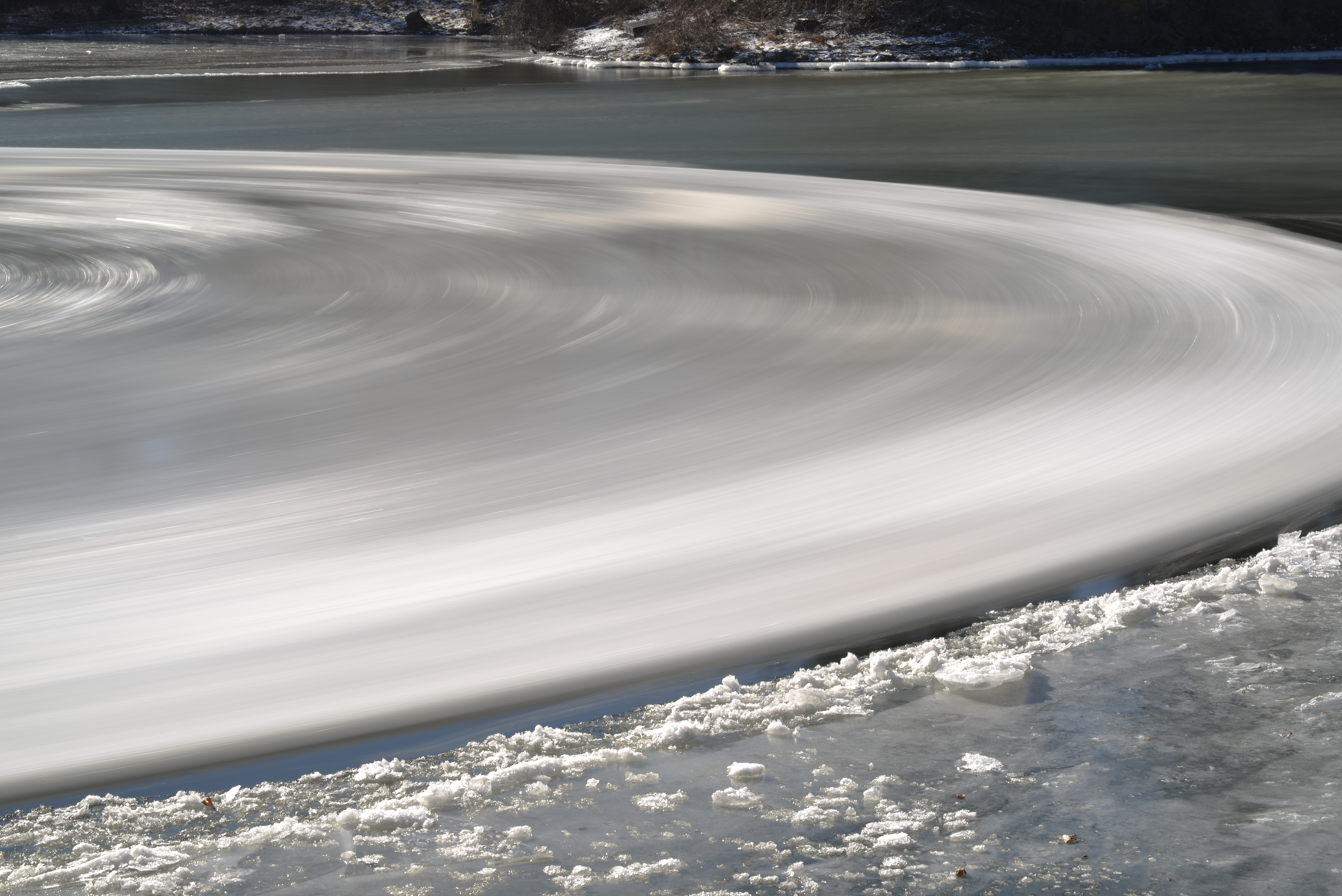
A long exposure image showing the rotation of the large ice circle on the Esopus Creek in New York

Ice discs, ice circles, ice pans, ice pancakes or ice crepes are a very rare natural phenomenon that occurs in slow moving water in cold climates. They are thin circular slabs of ice that rotate slowly on a body of water's surface.

== Types ==
=== Ice discs ===
Ice discs form on the outer bends in a river where the accelerating water creates a force called 'rotational shear', which breaks off a chunk of ice and twists it around. As the disc rotates, it grinds against surrounding ice — smoothing into a circle. A relatively uncommon phenomenon, one of the earliest recordings is of a slowly revolving disc spotted on the Mianus River and reported in an 1895 edition of Scientific American.

=== Ice pans ===
River specialist and geography professor Joe Desloges states that ice pans are "surface slabs of ice that form in the center of a lake or creek, instead of along the water’s edge". As water cools, ice crystals form into 'frazil ice' and can cluster together into a pan-shaped formation. If an ice pan accumulates enough frazil ice and the current remains slow, the pan may transform into a 'hanging dam', a heavy block of ice with high ridges and a low centre.

== Formation ==
=== Conditions ===
It is believed that ice circles form in eddy currents. It has been shown that existing ice discs can maintain their rotation due to melting.

=== Physics ===
Ice circles tend to rotate even when they form in water that is not moving. The ice circle lowers the temperature of the water around it, which causes the water to become denser than the slightly warmer water around it. The dense water then sinks and creates its own circular motion, causing the ice circle to rotate.

=== Size ===
An unusual natural phenomenon, ice disks occur in slowly moving water in cold climates and can vary in size, with circles more than 15 metres (49 feet) in diameter observed. Ice Circle of Vana-Vigala in Estonia is reported to have had a diameter of over 20 meters, whilst one approximately 298 feet (91 meters) in diameter appeared in Westbrook, Maine in January 2019.

== Notable examples ==
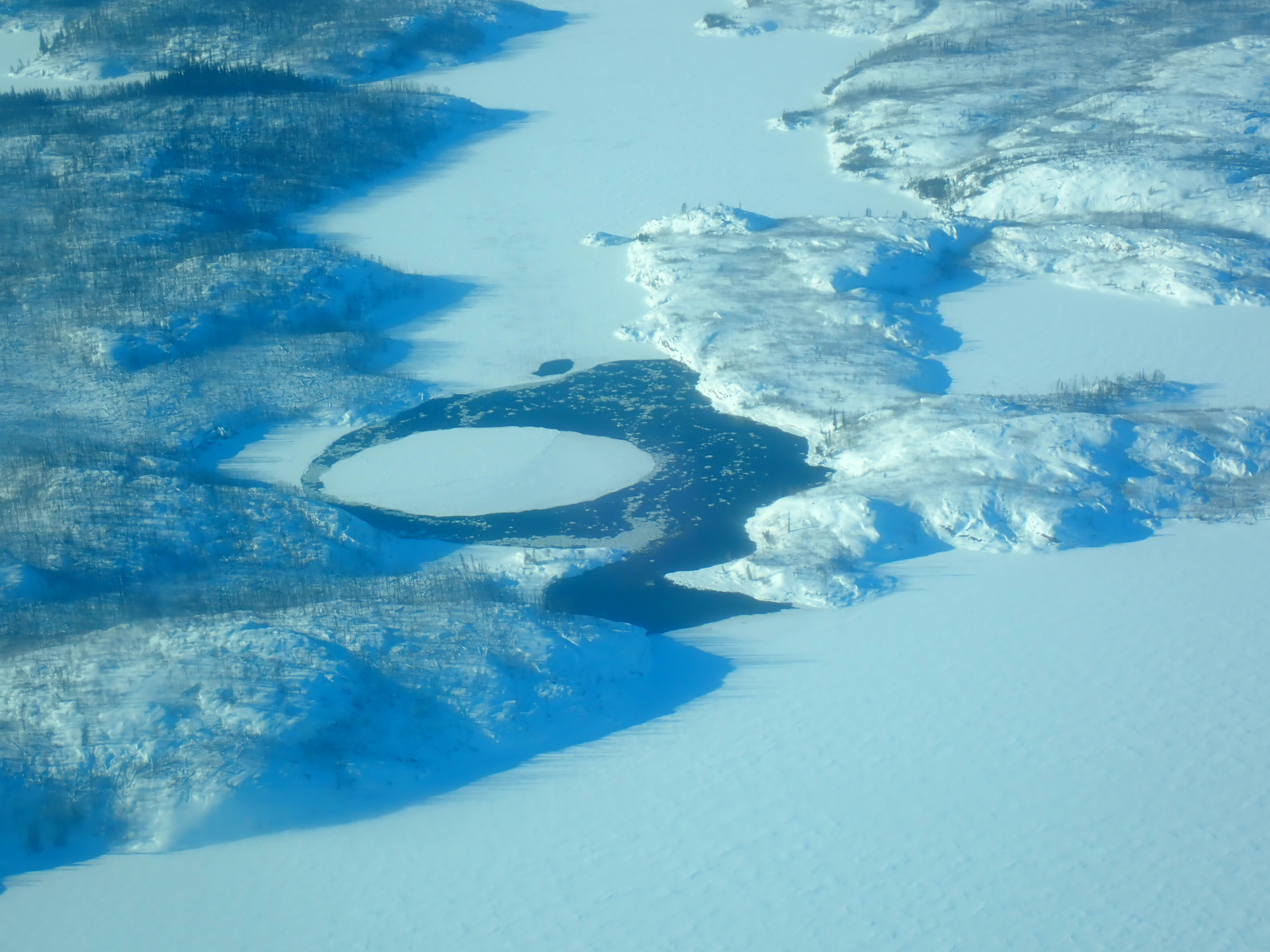
Tsu Lake ice circle. Taltson River, Northwest Territories. 23 February 2021.

Ice discs have most frequently been observed in Scandinavia and North America. An ice disc was observed in Wales in December 2008 and another one in England in January 2009. An ice disc was observed on the Sheyenne River in North Dakota in December 2013. An ice circle of approximately 15 m (50 ft) in diameter was observed and photographed in Lake Katrine, New York on the Esopus Creek around 23 January 2014. In Idaho, extreme weather led to a rare sighting of an ice disc on the Snake River on 22 January 2014.

On 14 January 2019, an ice disc approximately 298 feet (91 metres) wide on the Presumpscot River in Westbrook, Maine, United States drew wide media attention. A smaller disc was reported by park rangers in Baxter State Park, in northern Maine, the same month. In January 2020, an ice disc appeared on the Kennebec River in Skowhegan, Maine, United States

In January 2021 a large ice circle was discovered via satellite imagery and on 23 February 2021, an ice disc estimated to be 196–202 metres (643–663 ft) wide was confirmed on the Taltson River, Northwest Territories (just below Tsu Lake). It was estimated to be rotating at approximately 20–25 minutes per rotation.

== Artificial ice circles ==
Artificial ice circles have also been created by cutting a large circle in a sheet of ice. These artificial creations are called "ice carousels". Record setting ice carousels are recorded by the World Ice Carousel Association.

== See also ==
- Foam line – Accumulations of foam on the surface of freshwater water courses or bodies
- El Ojo - Rotating floating circular island in Argentina's Paraná Delta, consisting of vegetation and soil
