= Merry-Go-Round (disambiguation) =

A merry-go-round or carousel is a popular amusement ride.

Merry-Go-Round or Merry Go Round may also refer to:

- Roundabout (play), a popular park and playground ride

== Films ==
- The Merry-Go-Round (film), a 1920 German silent film
- Merry-Go-Round (1923 film), a film by Erich von Stroheim
- Merry-Go-Round of 1938, a 1937 comedy film by Irving Cummings
- Merry-Go-Round (1956 film), a Hungarian drama
- Merry-Go-Round (1981 film), a film by Jacques Rivette
- Merry-Go-Round (2001 film), a Hong Kong film starring Lawrence Chou and Rainie Yang
- Merry-Go-Round (2010 film), a Turkish drama film
- Merry-Go-Round (2010 Hong Kong film), a Hong Kong film of 2010
- Merry-Go-Round (2017 film), a Ukrainian-Polish short film

== Music ==
- The Merry-Go-Round, a Los Angeles-based pop band

=== Albums ===
- Merry Go Round (Delinquent Habits album) (2000)
- Merry-Go-Round (Elvin Jones album) (1972)
- Merry-Go-Round, a 2000 album by Freddy Cole

=== Songs ===
- "Merry Go Round" (The Replacements song), from All Shook Down (1990)
- "Merry-Go-Round" (Moya Brennan song), from Heart Strings (2006)
- "Merry Go Round" (Royce da 5'9" song) from Success Is Certain (2011)
- "Merry Go 'Round" (Kacey Musgraves song), from Same Trailer Different Park (2012)
- "Merry-Go-Round" (Ayumi Hamasaki song), from Colours (2014)
- "Merry Go Round", English language title of "En karusell", a 1972 song by ABBA
- "Merry Go Round", a 2005 song by Babyshambles from Down in Albion
- "Merry Go Round", a 2020 song by Bladee from Exeter
- "Merry Go Round", a 2026 song by BTS from Arirang (album)
- "Merry-Go-Round", a 1991 song by Deborah Blando from A Different Story
- "Merry Go Round", a 1968 song by Fleetwood Mac from Fleetwood Mac
- "Merry Go Round", a 2025 song by Fromis 9 from From Our 20's
- "Merry Go Round", a 2011 song by the JaneDear Girls from the JaneDear girls
- "Merry Go Round", a 1990 song by Keith Sweat from I'll Give All My Love to You
- "Merry-Go-Round", a 1976 song by Montrose from Jump On It
- "Merry-Go-Round", a 1981 song by Mötley Crüe from Too Fast for Love
- "Merry Go Round", a 1968 song by Wild Man Fischer from An Evening with Wild Man Fischer
- "Merry-Go-Round", a 2004 song by Joe Hisaishi from Howl's Moving Castle (film)
- "MerryGoRound", a 2013 song by Fitz and the Tantrums from More Than Just a Dream
- "MerryGoRound", a 2008 song by The Vines from Melodia (album)

== Other uses ==
- Merry-Go-Round (Gertler painting)
- Merry-Go-Round (radio programme), a World War II BBC programme
- Merry-Go-Round (TV series), a 1961 Australian television show
- Merry-Go-Round (retailer), a defunct American clothing retailer
- Merry-Go Round, an educational BBC TV series aimed at primary school children (1963-1983)

== See also ==
- Carousel (disambiguation)
- Emery Go-Round, a free public transit system in Emeryville, California
- "Marry-Go-Round", a season 4 episode of TV show Charmed
- Merry-go-round train
- The Merry-Go-Round Broke Down, the intro theme for Warner Bros' Looney Tunes
