= Vana-Vigala =

Village in Estonia

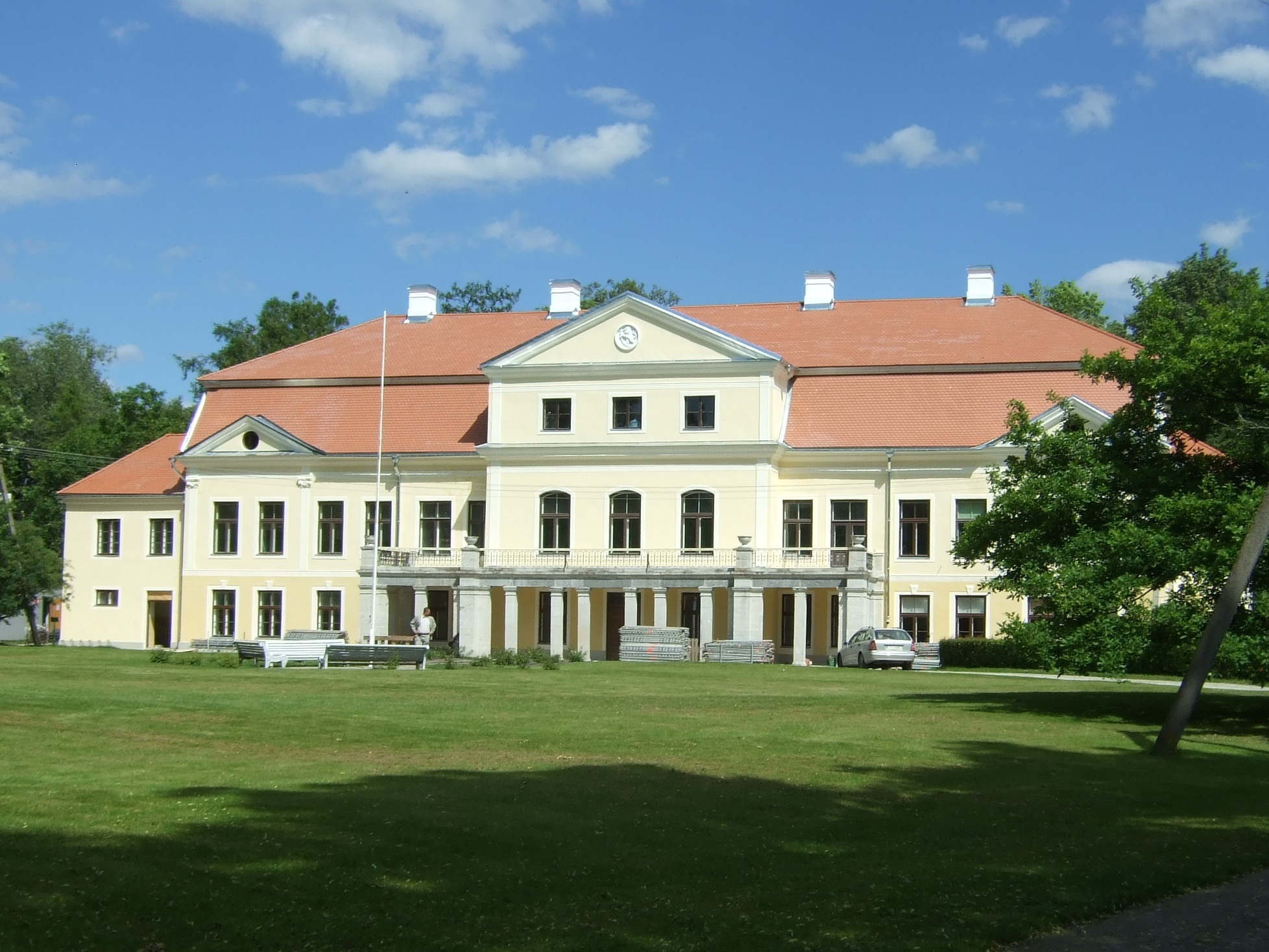
- Vana-Vigala Manor

- Location within Estonia
- Coordinates: 58°46′11″N 24°16′25″E
- Country: Estonia
- County: Rapla County

Area (2020)
  - Total: 15.9 km^{2} (6.1 sq mi)

Population (January 2020)
  - Total: 270
- Time zone: UTC+2 (EET)

Vana-Vigala is a village in Märjamaa Parish, Rapla County in western Estonia.

Since 2002, the metal festival Hard Rock Laager has been held in Vana-Vigala every summer.

The Vigala River flows through Vana-Vigala. The natural phenomenon known as the Ice Circle of Vana-Vigala appears on the river.

== Vana-Vigala Manor ==
Vana-Vigala Manor (German: Fickel) dates from 1420, when the first fortified manor house was built near the present building. The current building was built from 1772 to 1775. It stands on soft ground and has had to be strengthened on several occasions. In 1858 and 1864, restoration was carried out and the façade was changed. During the Russian Revolution of 1905, rioters set fire to the house, with heavy damage ensuing, including the loss of the 20,000-volume library. The house was later restored, and by 1914 it had regained most of its earlier look. In the 18th century, a romantic park and a deer park were laid out around the manor.

During almost its entire history, the estate belonged to the Uexküll family, who owned the estate from 1420 until 1919, when it was expropriated following Estonia's declaration of independence. The building has subsequently served as various educational institutions.

== Images ==
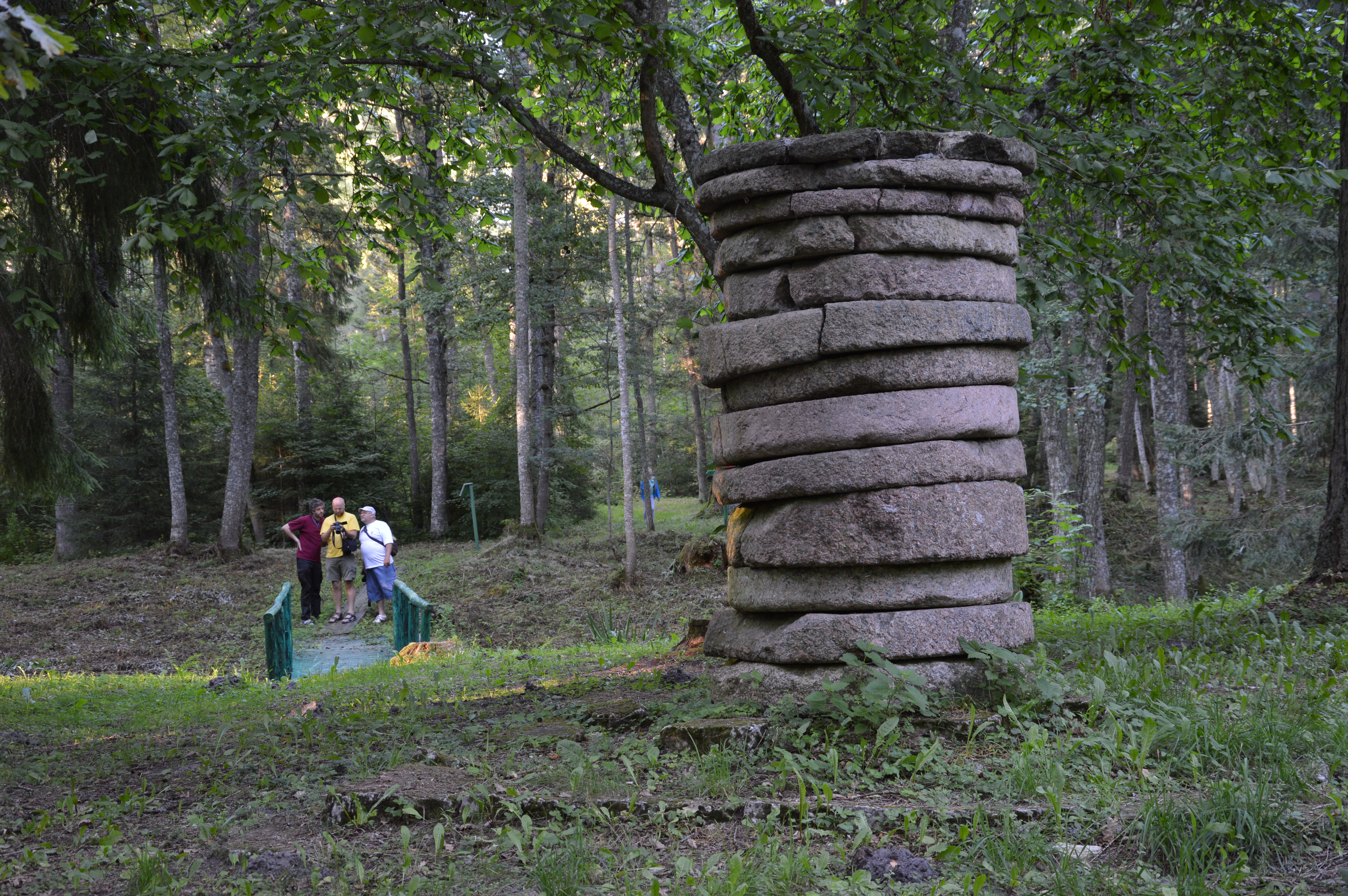
Deer park

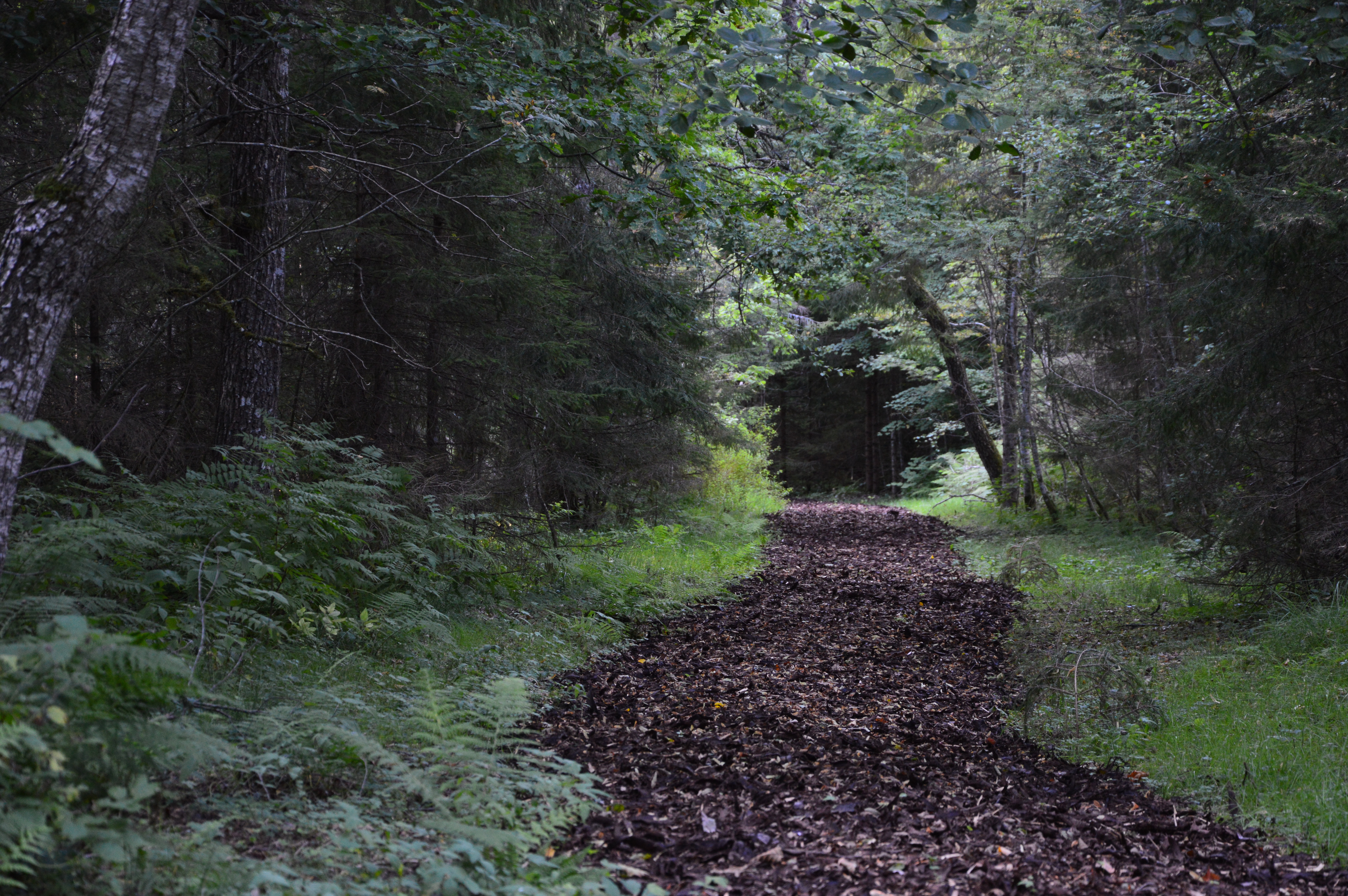
Deer park

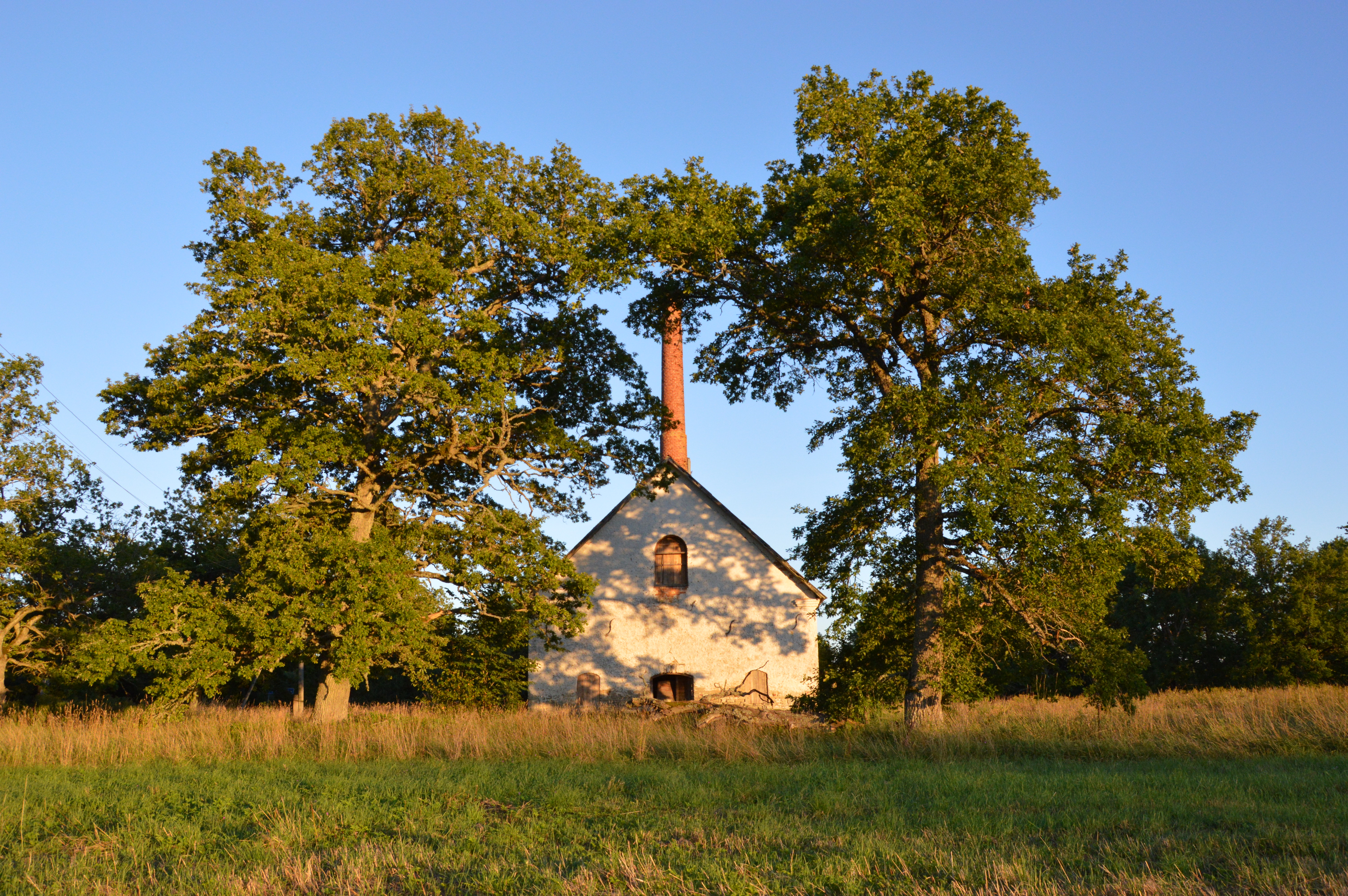
Manor distillery

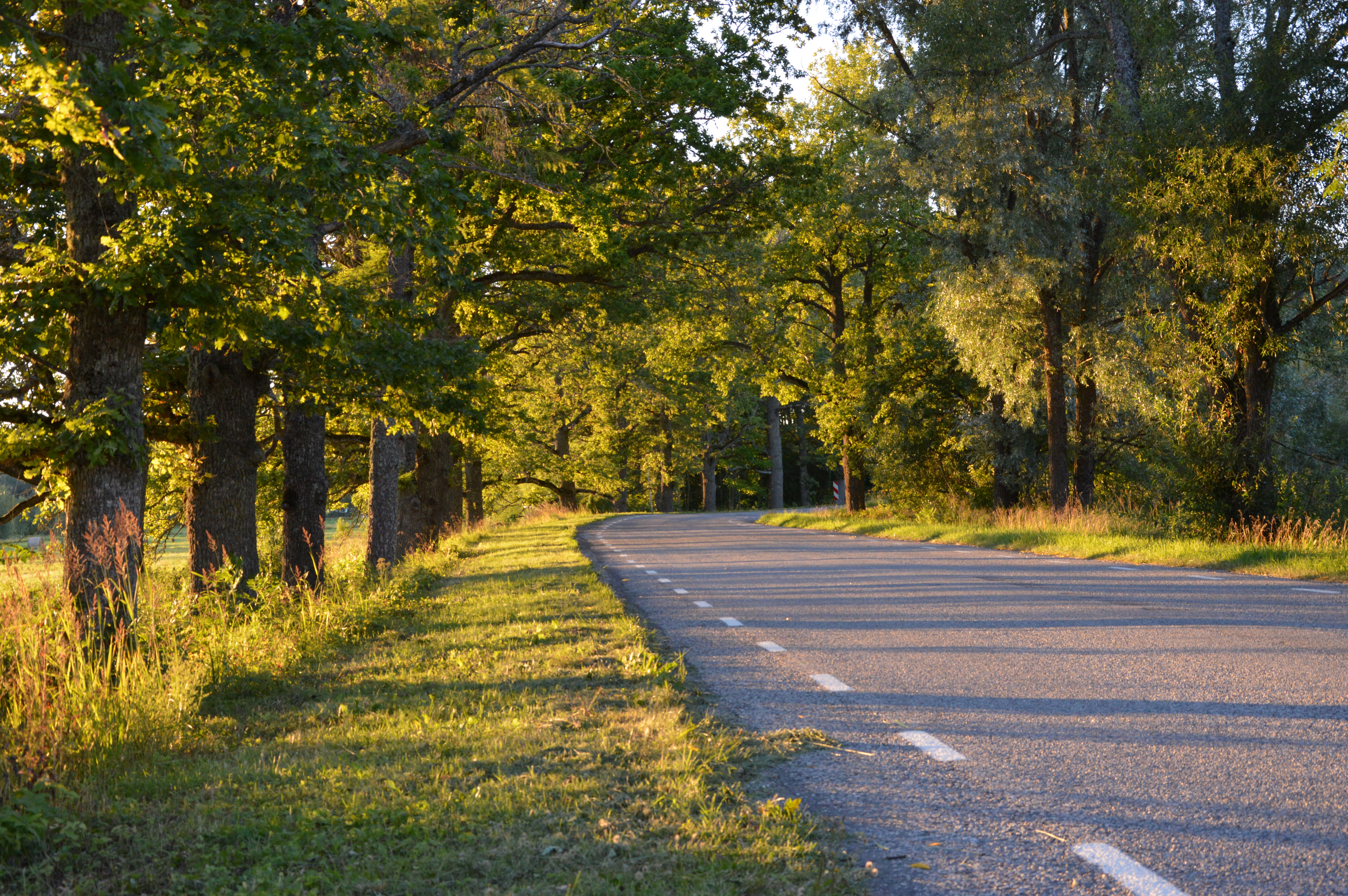

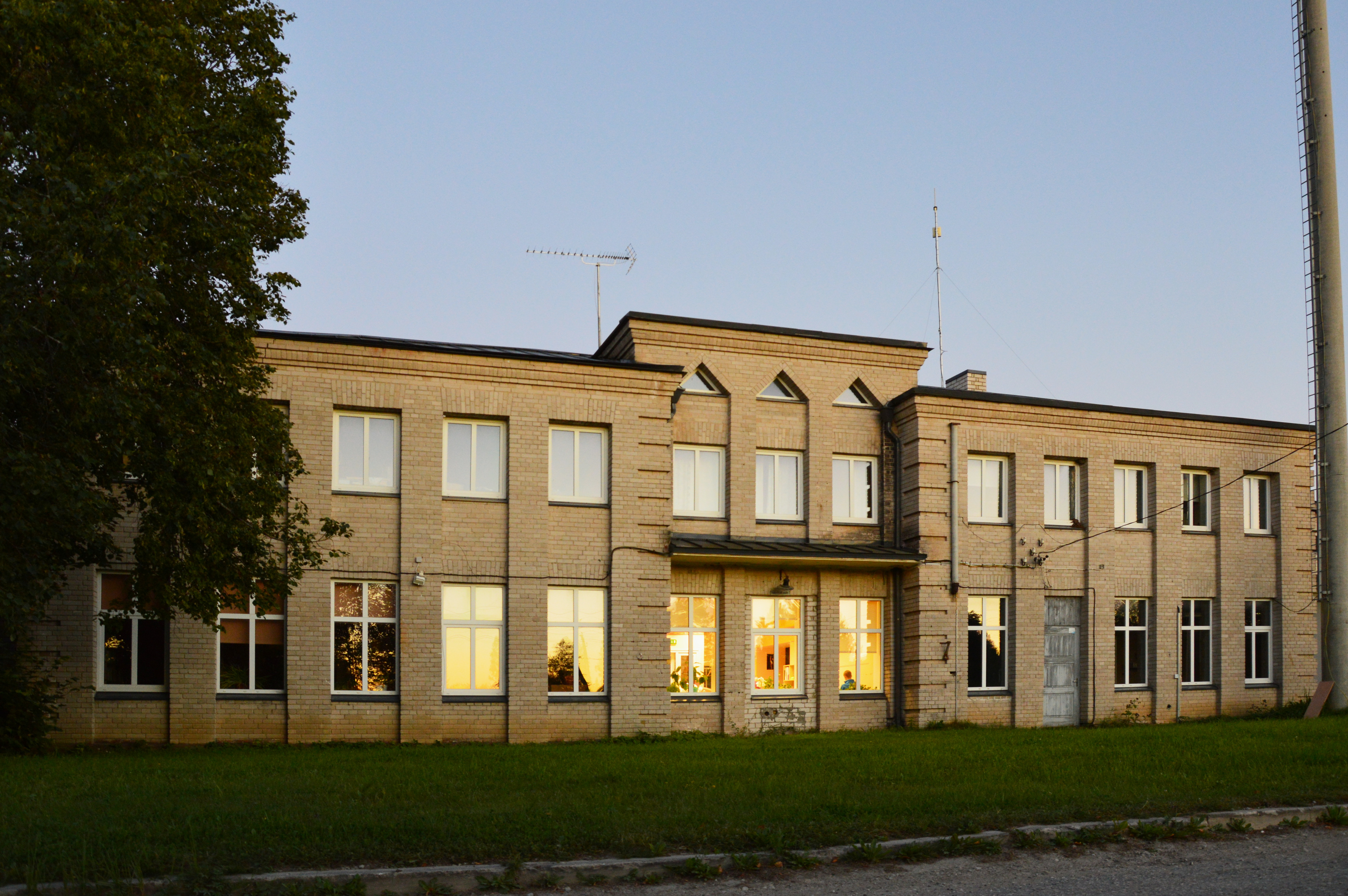
Old railway station

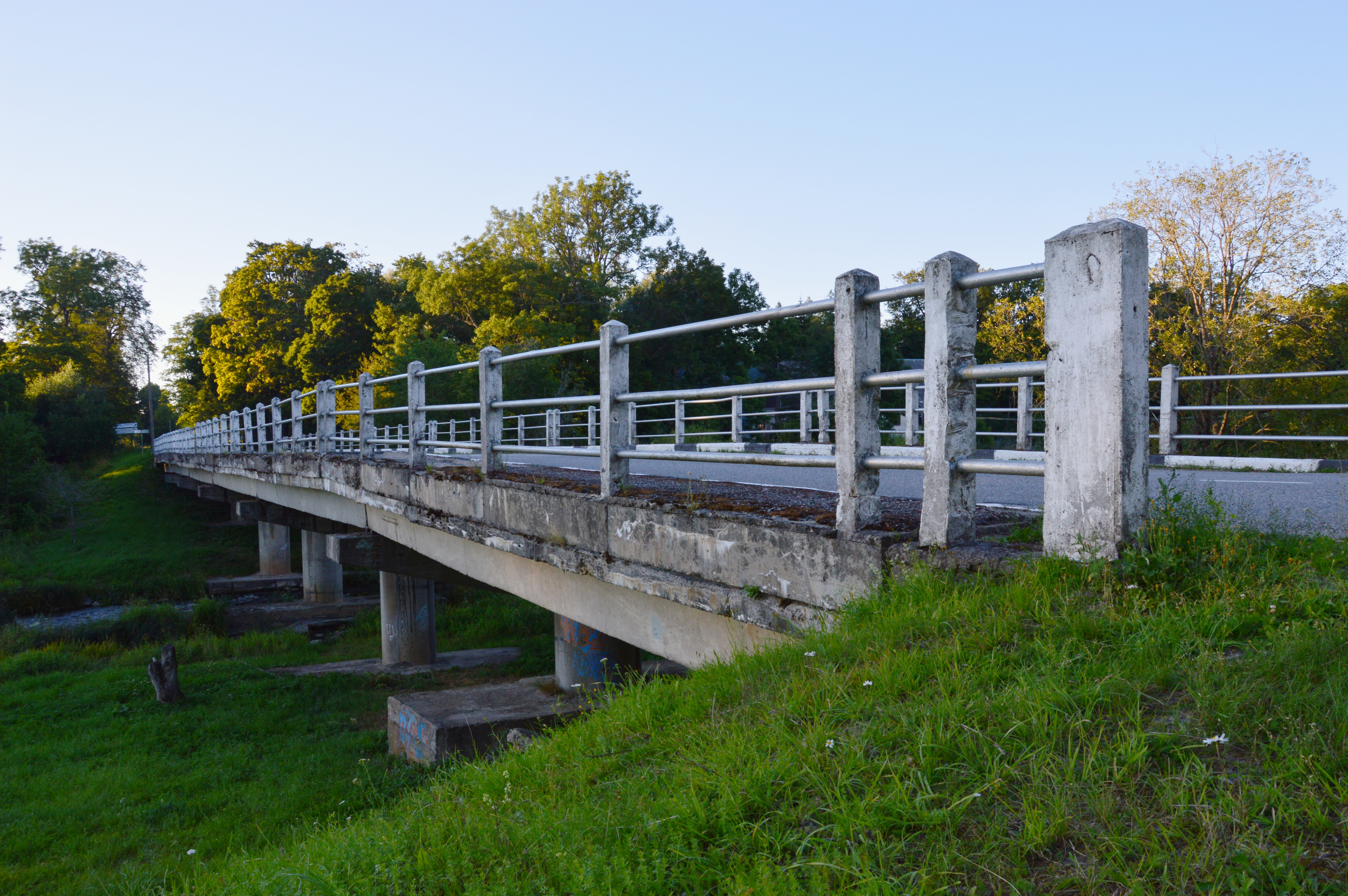
Bridge over the Vigala River

== Notable people ==
- Tarvi Thomberg (born 1982), Estonian wrestler

== See also ==
- List of palaces and manor houses in Estonia
