= Ice circle of Vana-Vigala =

Freezing-related natural phenomenon in Estonia

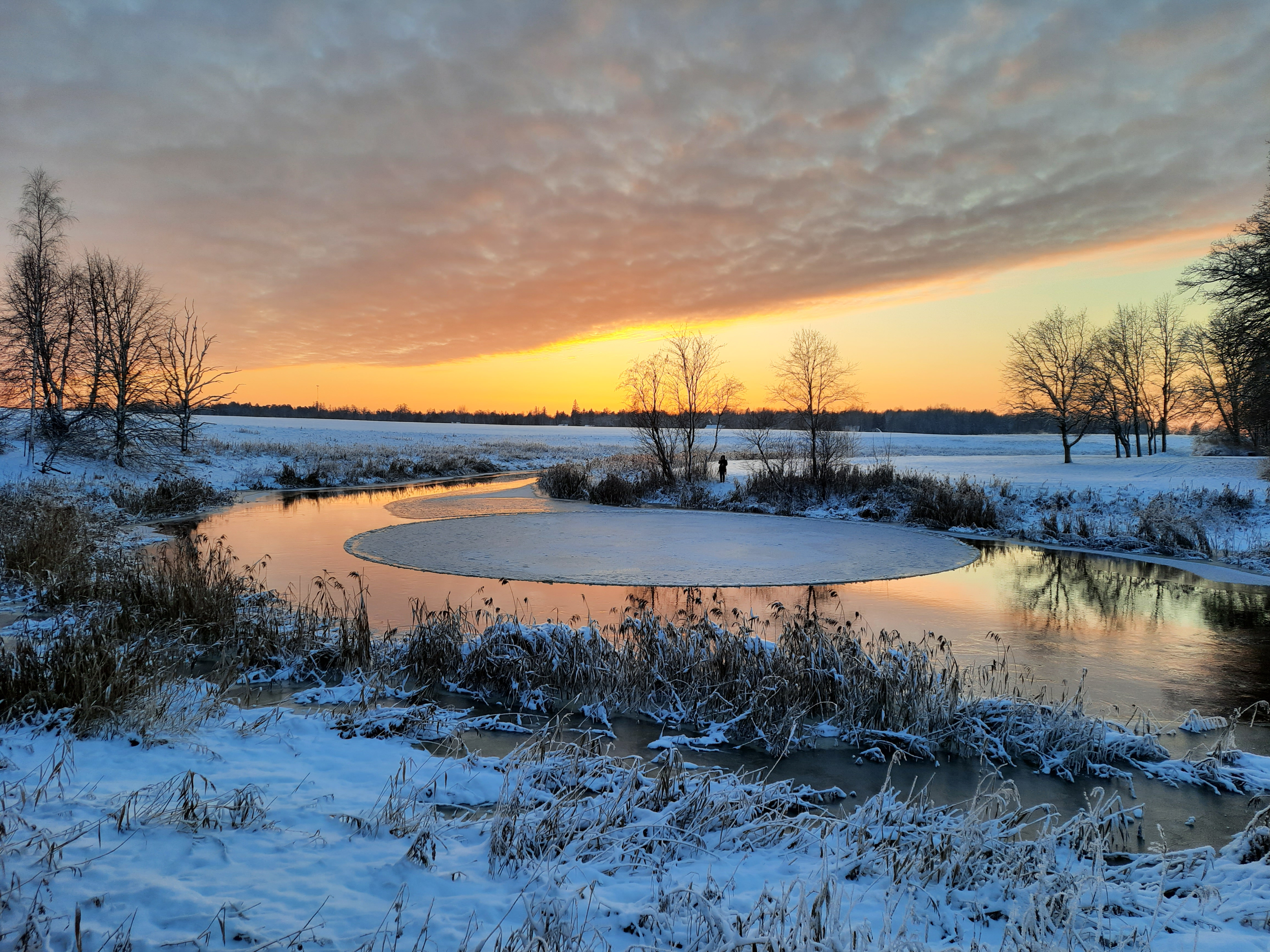
The ice disk of Vana-Vigala in November 2023

The ice circle of Vana-Vigala is a natural phenomenon appearing on the Vigala River in Estonia while the river freezes.

It can be seen in Vana-Vigala village near the old manor park.

The diameter of the disk is approximately 23–24 m. The first documented mention of this phenomenon is in 2004.

== Gallery ==
Bird's eye view of the disk, filmed in January 2019

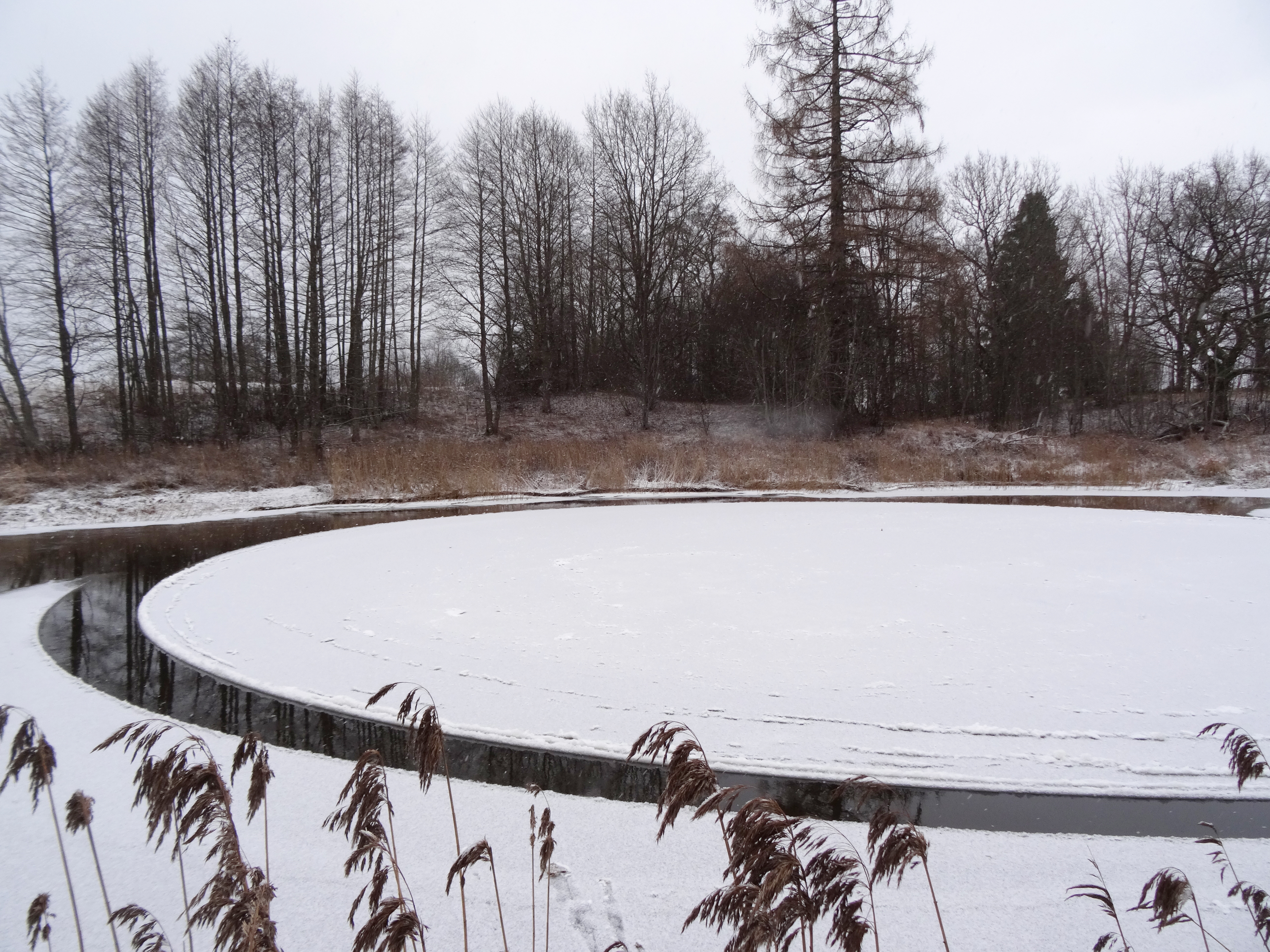
Ice disk of Vana-Vigala in January 2016

Ice disk of Vana-Vigala in January 2016 (background music by local musicians playing the garmon)

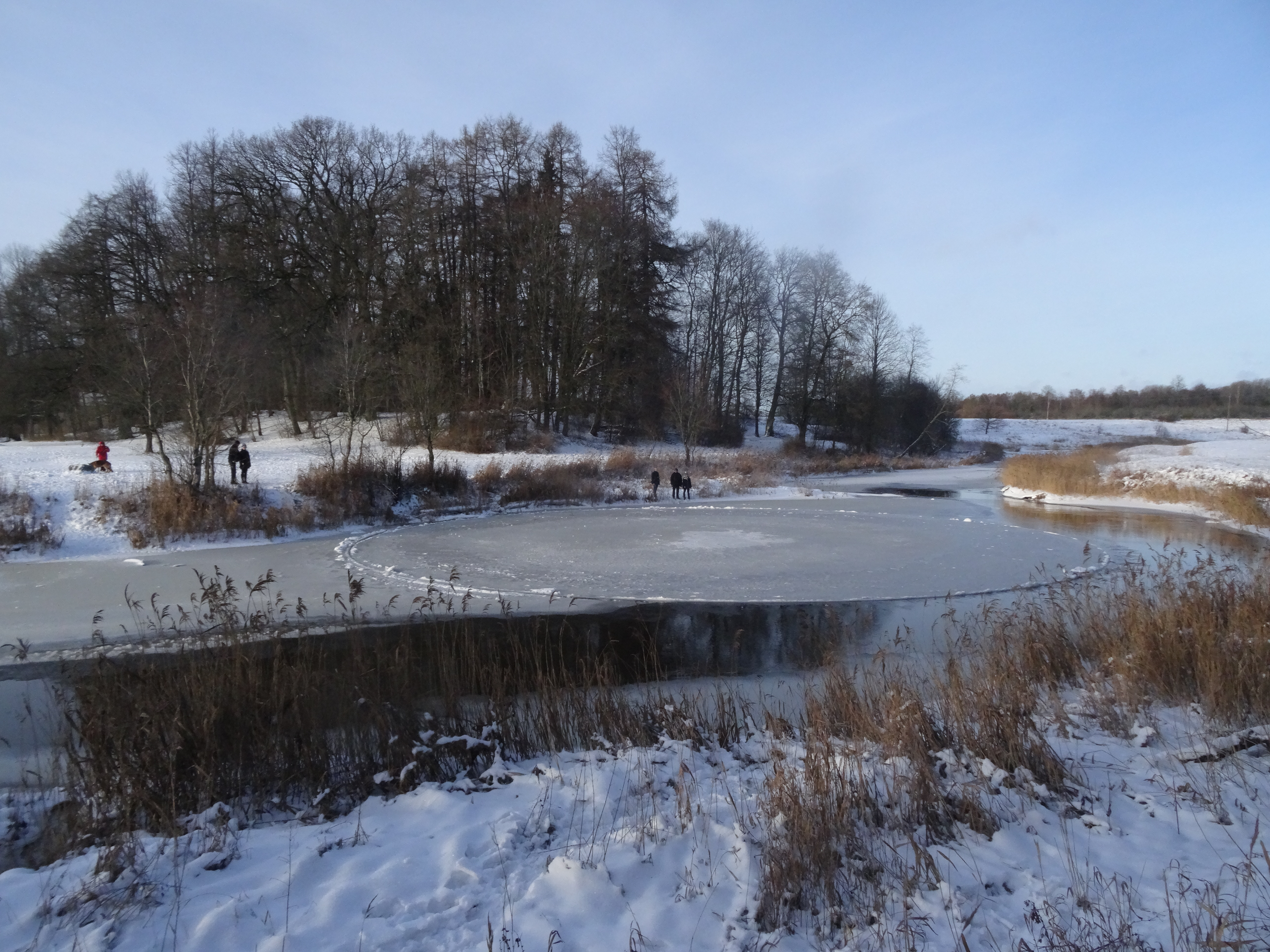
January 2019
