= Battrans =

- Commune
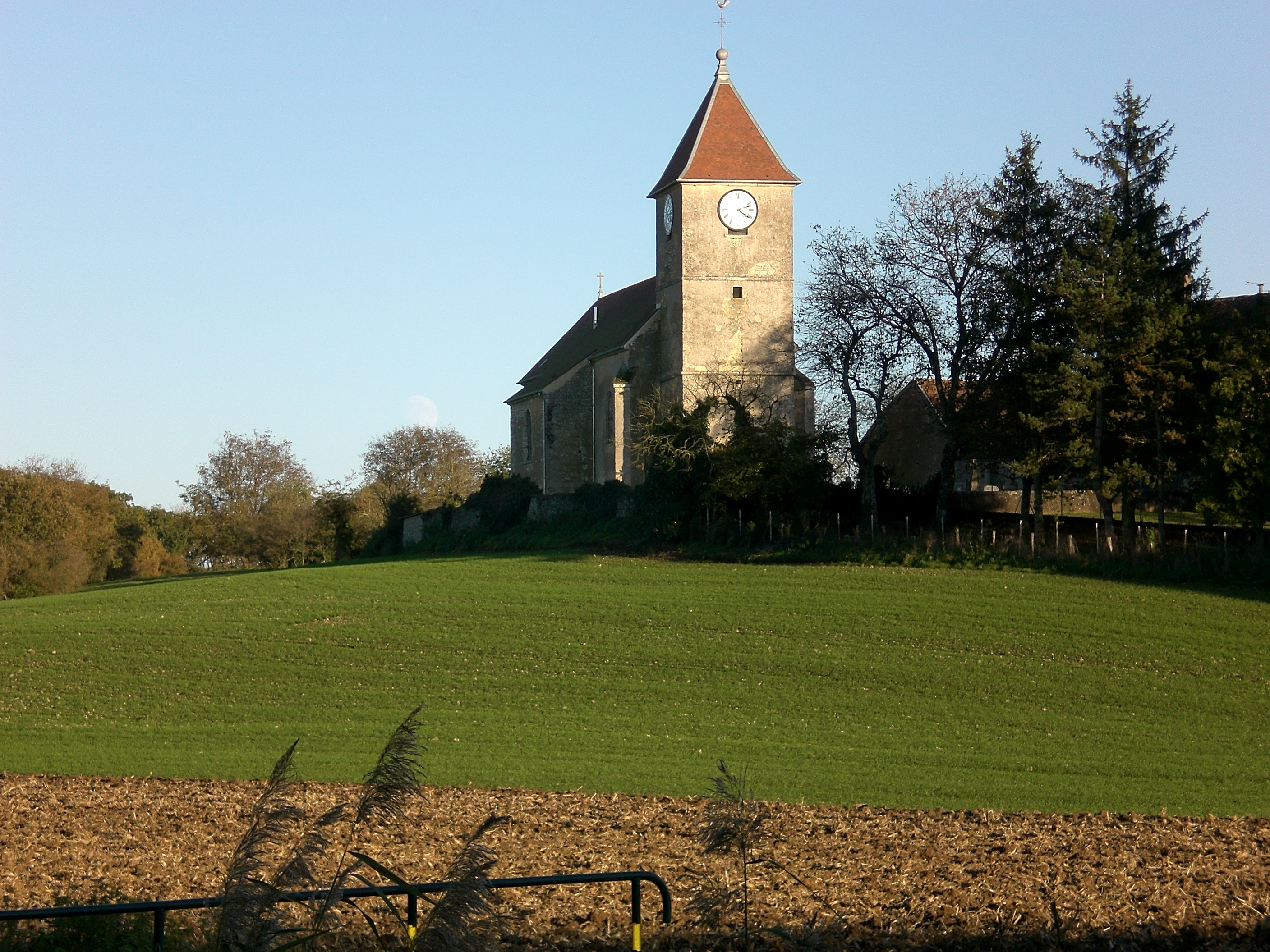
- The church in Battrans

- Coat of arms
- Location of Battrans
- Location within France Location within Bourgogne-Franche-Comté
- Coordinates: 47°25′46″N 5°38′16″E
- Country: France
- Region: Bourgogne-Franche-Comté
- Department: Haute-Saône
- Arrondissement: Vesoul
- Canton: Gray

Government
  - Mayor (2020–2026): Jérôme Pruneau
- Area^{1}: 5.32 km^{2} (2.05 sq mi)
- Highest elevation: 239 m (784 ft)
- Lowest elevation: 194 m (636 ft)
- Population (2023): 196
  - Density: 36.8/km^{2} (95.4/sq mi)
- Time zone: UTC+01:00 (CET)
  - Summer (DST): UTC+02:00 (CEST)
- INSEE/Postal code: 70054 /70100
- ^{1} French Land Register data, which excludes lakes, ponds, glaciers > 1 km^{2} (0.386 sq mi or 247 acres) and river estuaries.

Battrans (French pronunciation: [batʁɑ̃]) is a commune in the Haute-Saône department in the region of Bourgogne-Franche-Comté in eastern France.

== Points of interest ==
- Parc de l'Étang

== See also ==
- Communes of the Haute-Saône department
