= Carousell =

Carousell may refer to:

- Carousell, a pseudonym of British musician Richard Skelton
- Carousell (company), a Singaporean e-commerce company
- B&B Carousell, a historic carousel located in Coney Island, Brooklyn

== See also ==
- Carousel (disambiguation)
