= Backshore =

Part of a beach inland of the high water foam lines

The backshore area of a beach extends from the limit of high water foam lines to dunes or extreme inland limit of the beach. It is only affected by waves during exceptional high tides or severe storms.

Sediments in this area are well-sorted and well-rounded. Its grain sizes are mainly coarse sand and medium sand, which are larger than that in littoral barrier dune. The sedimentary structures include parallel bedding and low-angle cross-bedding.
