= Carousel Theater (disambiguation) =

Carousel Theater may refer to:

- Carousel Theater, a theatre in the round located in Framingham, Massachusetts, USA.
- A show building located in California's Disneyland that has housed the following attractions:
  - Carousel of Progress (1967–73)
  - America Sings (1974–88)
  - Innoventions (1998–present)
- The show building located in Florida's Walt Disney World that has housed the Carousel of Progress since 1975.
