= Ojo (surname) =

Ojo is a Nigerian surname of Yoruba origin. Notable people with the name include:

- Amos Ojo (1962–2025), Nigerian wrestler
- Daniel Ojo (born 2001), Italian footballer
- Funso Ojo (born 1991), Belgian football player
- Iyabo Ojo (born 1977), Nigerian film actress and director (marital name)
- Kim Ojo (born 1988), Nigerian football midfielder
- Micah Ojo (born 2009), American basketball player
- Michael Ojo (born 1989), Nigerian-American basketball player
- Michael Ojo (1993–2020), Nigerian-American basketball player
- Oluwakemi Adejoro Ojo, Nigerian actress
- Onome Ojo (born 1977), Nigerian-American football player
- Ronke Ojo (born 1974), Nigerian movie actress
- Sheyi Ojo (born 1997), English football player
- Tessy Ojo (born 1971), Nigerian-British charity executive
- Topsy Ojo (born 1985), English rugby union player
- Wale Ojo (born 1964), British-Nigerian actor
