= Vigala (river) =

River in Estonia

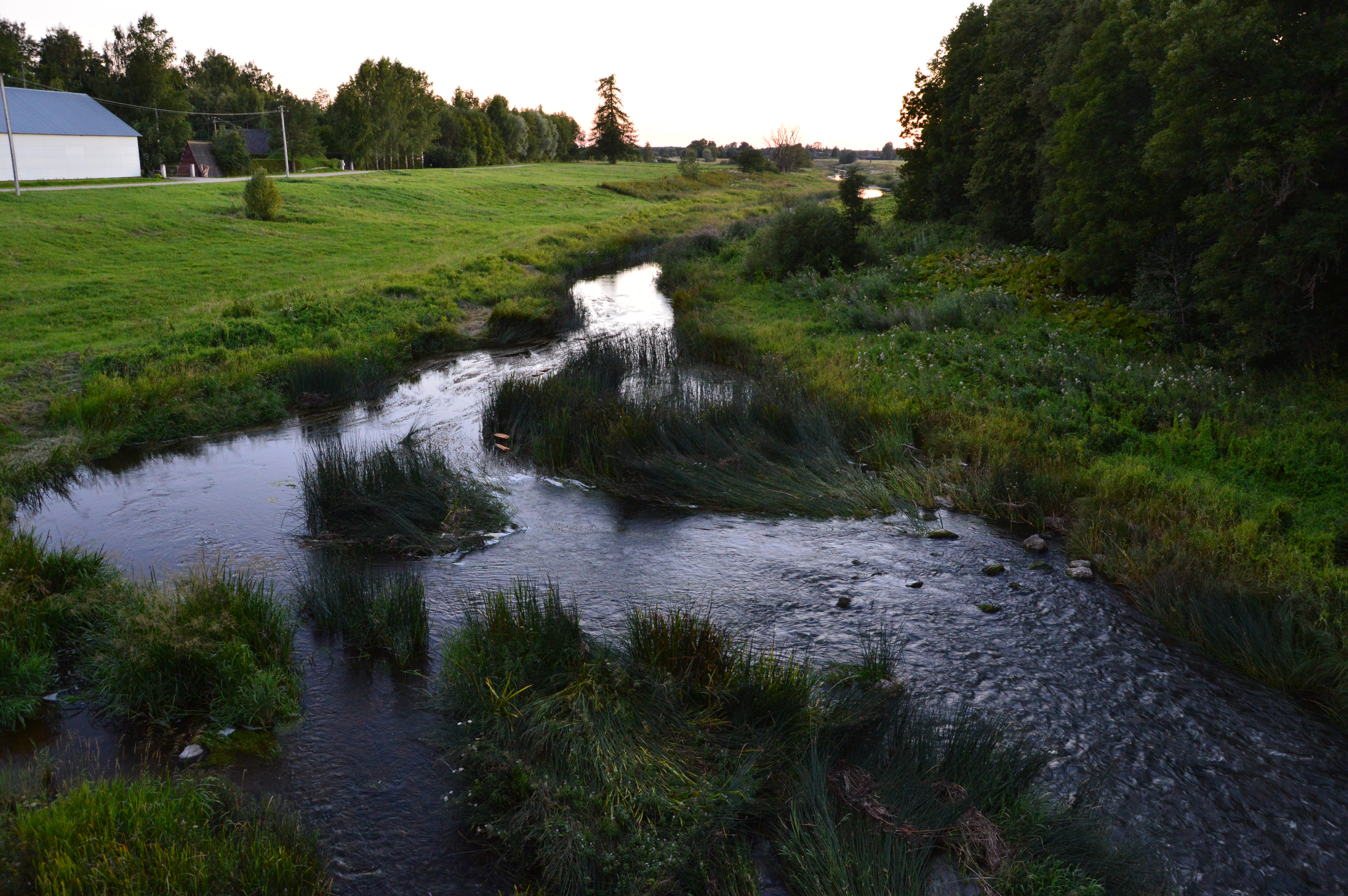
- The Vigala during summer in Vana-Vigala

Location
- Country: Estonia

Physical characteristics
- Source
  - location: Keava Bog
- Mouth: Kasari River
  - coordinates: 58°44′25″N 24°04′29″E
- Length: 97 km (60 mi)
- Basin size: 1,577 km^{2} (609 sq mi)

The Vigala is a 96.7 km (60.1 mi)-long river in Rapla County, Estonia. It is a tributary of the Kasari River. Its source is in the Keava Bog. The basin area of the Vigala is 1,577 km^{2} (609 sq mi).

The largest tributaries of the Vigala are the Velise and Rõue (left tributaries) and the Kodila (a right tributary).

The stone Konuvere Bridge over the Vigala River was the longest stone bridge in Estonia (110 m or 360 ft) when it was opened in 1861.

A rare natural phenomena, the Ice Circle of Vana-Vigala, occurs in the Vigala River.

== Gallery ==
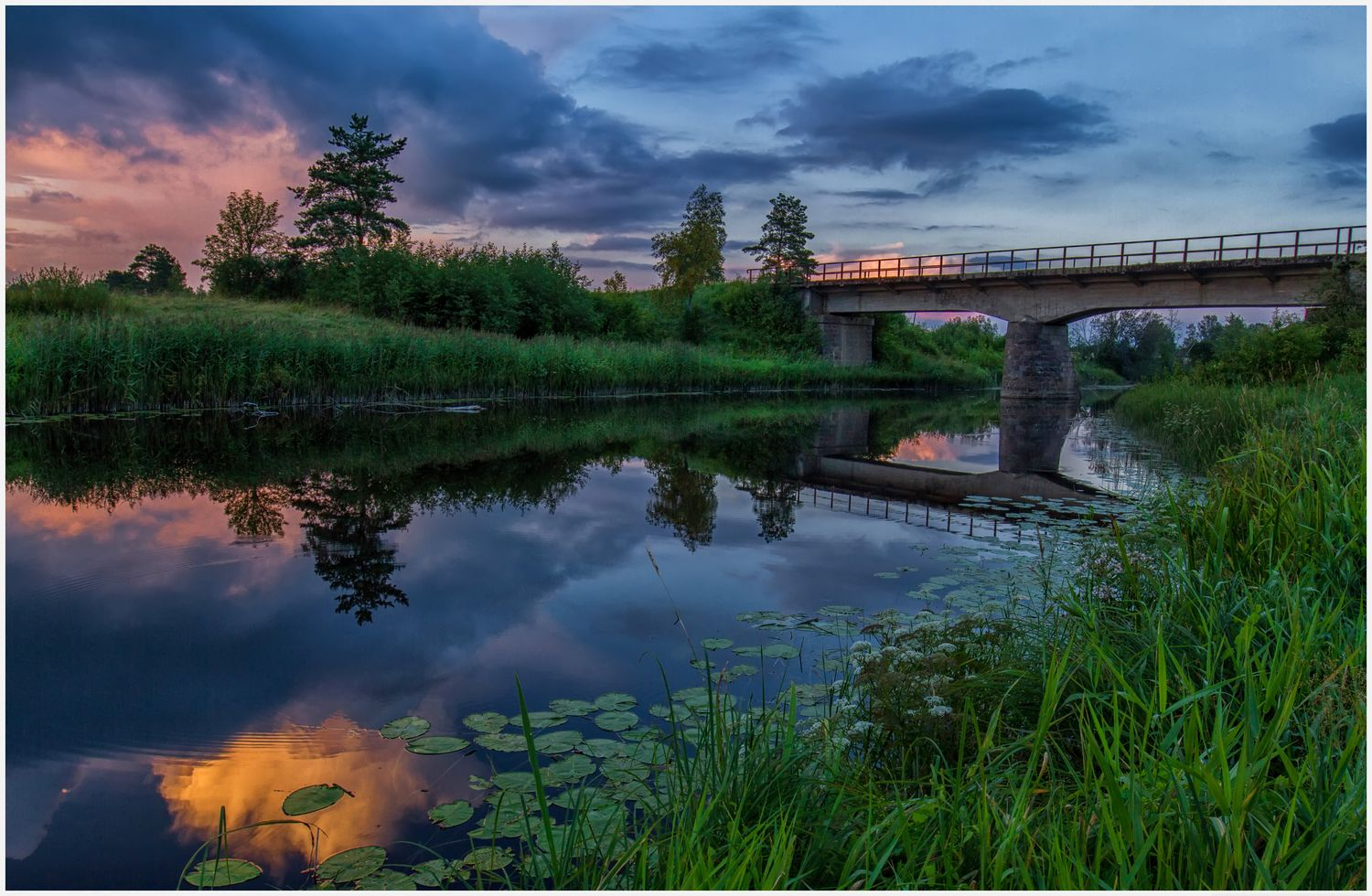
Konuvere railway bridge

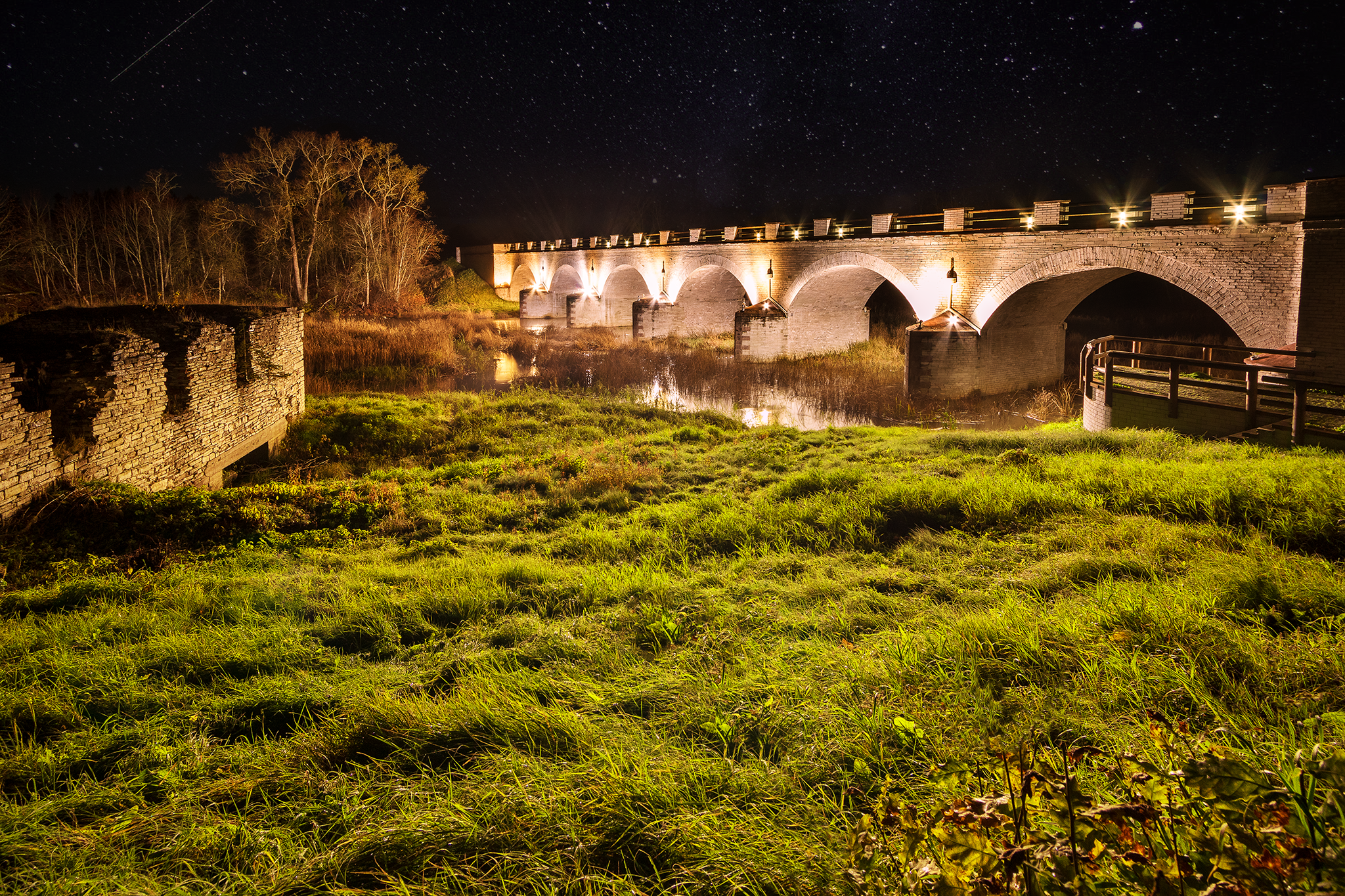
Konuvere stone bridge

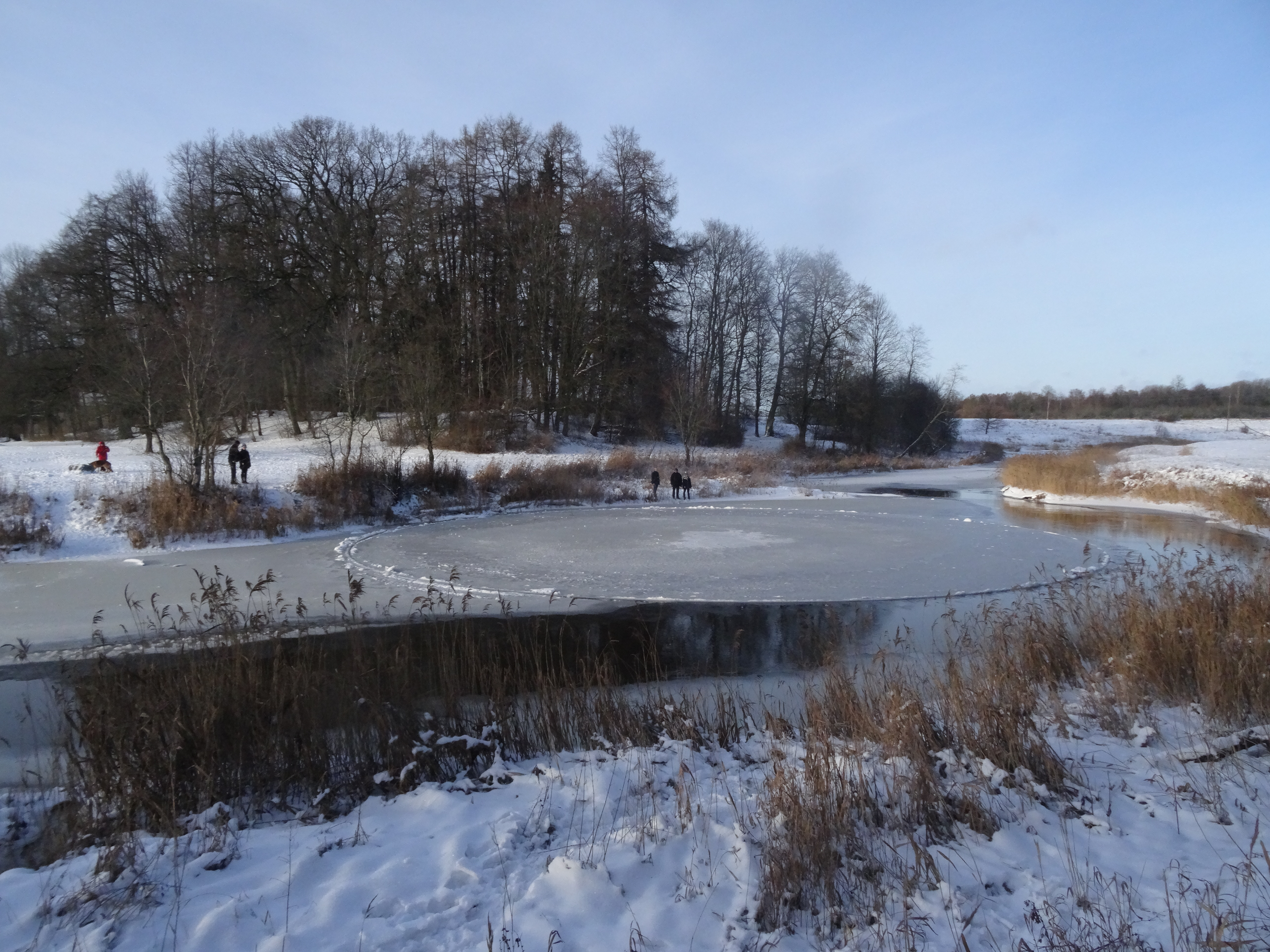
Ice Circle in Vana-Vigala

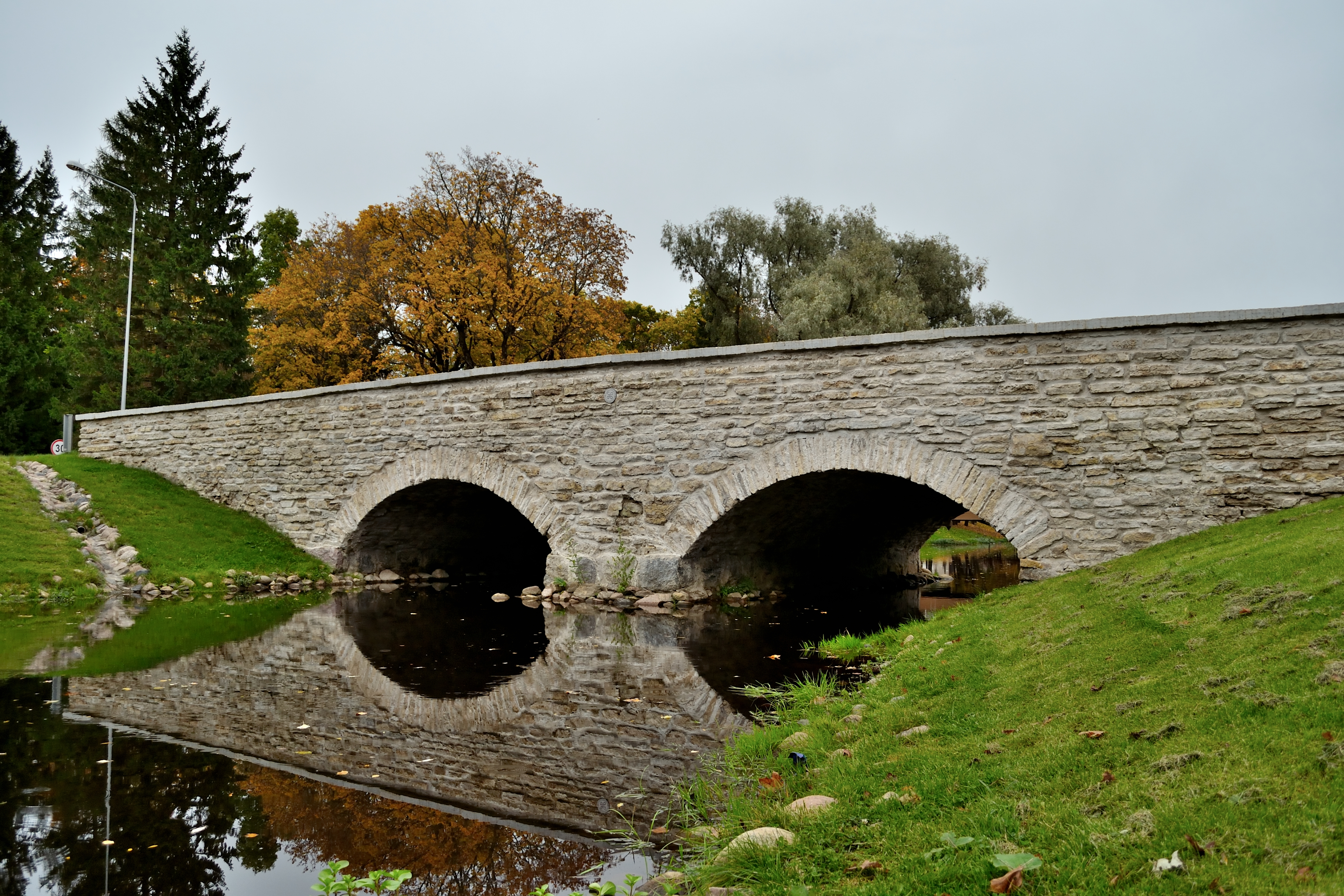
Rapla stone bridge
