= El Ojo =

Circular floating island in Argentina

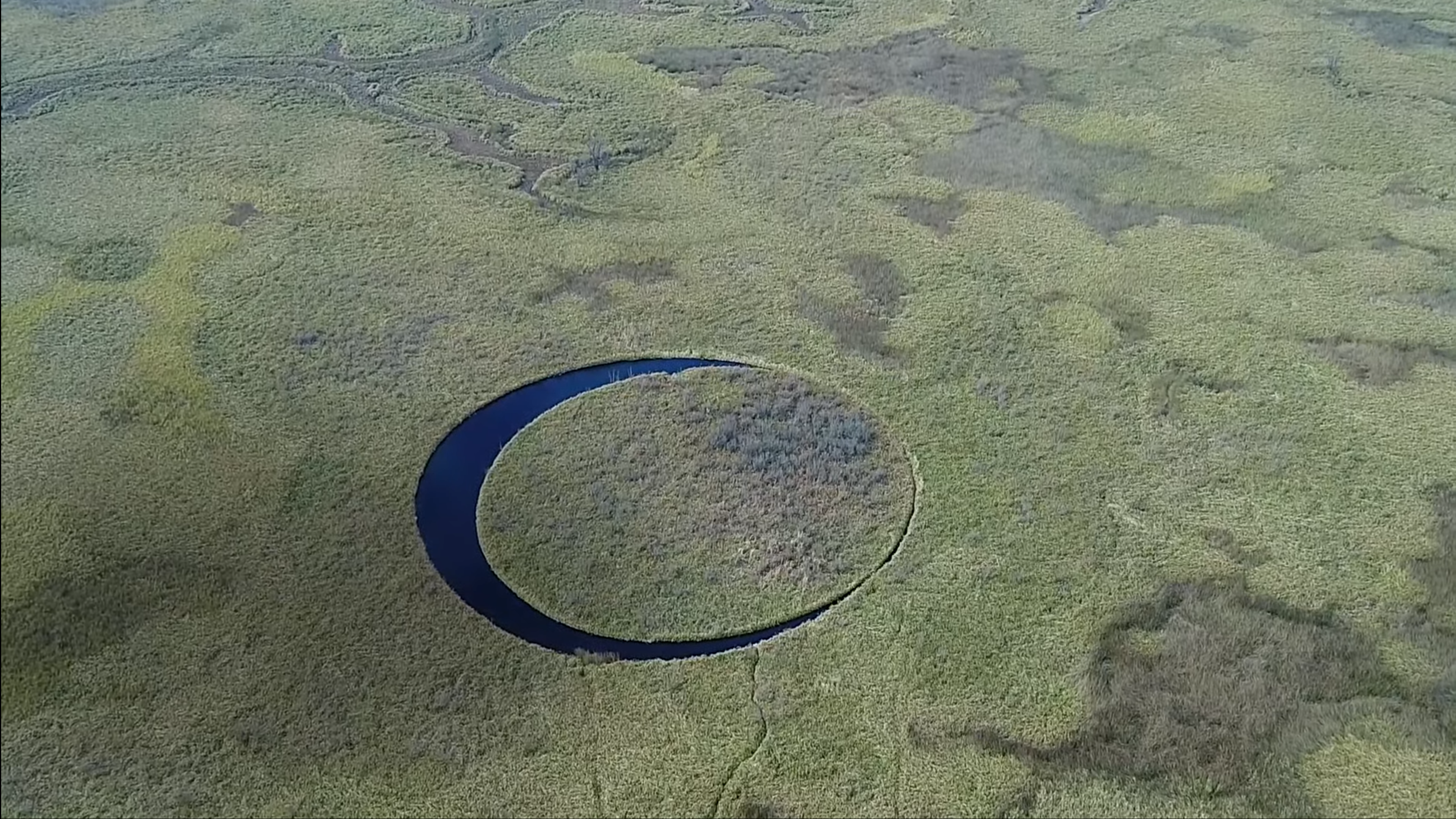
- Aerial view of El Ojo island

- Location in Buenos Aires Province

Geography
- Location: Paraná Delta
- Coordinates: 34°15′08″S 58°49′48″W
- Area: 13,924 m^{2} (149,880 sq ft)

El Ojo (lit. 'The Eye') is an uninhabited circular rotating floating island located within a slightly larger circular lake in the Paraná Delta in the Buenos Aires Province, Argentina.

== Description ==
The island is unusual among floating islands as its shape is almost perfectly circular. As the island is constantly rotating on its own axis due to the flow of the river beneath it, shearing occurs around its outer edge, eroding the island into its circular shape, similar to ice disks.

The island is currently approximately 118 m (387 ft) in diameter, but it is expected to get smaller over time with erosion. It is not yet known how or when the island was formed, with the first known Google Earth imagery being dated 2003.

The island was named because of its resemblance to an eye when viewed from above: as the island rotates within its surrounding circular lake, the eye appears to move. The island has been compared to a similarly shaped and rotating floating ice disk phenomenon observed in the Presumpscot River near Westbrook, Maine.

Whilst already known to locals, wider awareness of El Ojo was brought after the island was seen in 2016 by Argentinian filmmaker Sergio Neuspiller and crew. Research has shown that the island has existed at least since 2003. In 2016, Neuspiller and hydraulic engineer Ricardo Petroni started crowdfunding an expedition to the island, hoping to perform scuba diving, drone data collection, and soil and plant analysis; however, their fundraising attempts failed, reaching only US$9,898 of their US$50,000 goal. On 10 October 2016, Kickstarter declared the fundraising campaign unsuccessful.
