= Ice carousel =

Piece of ice made to spin like a carousel

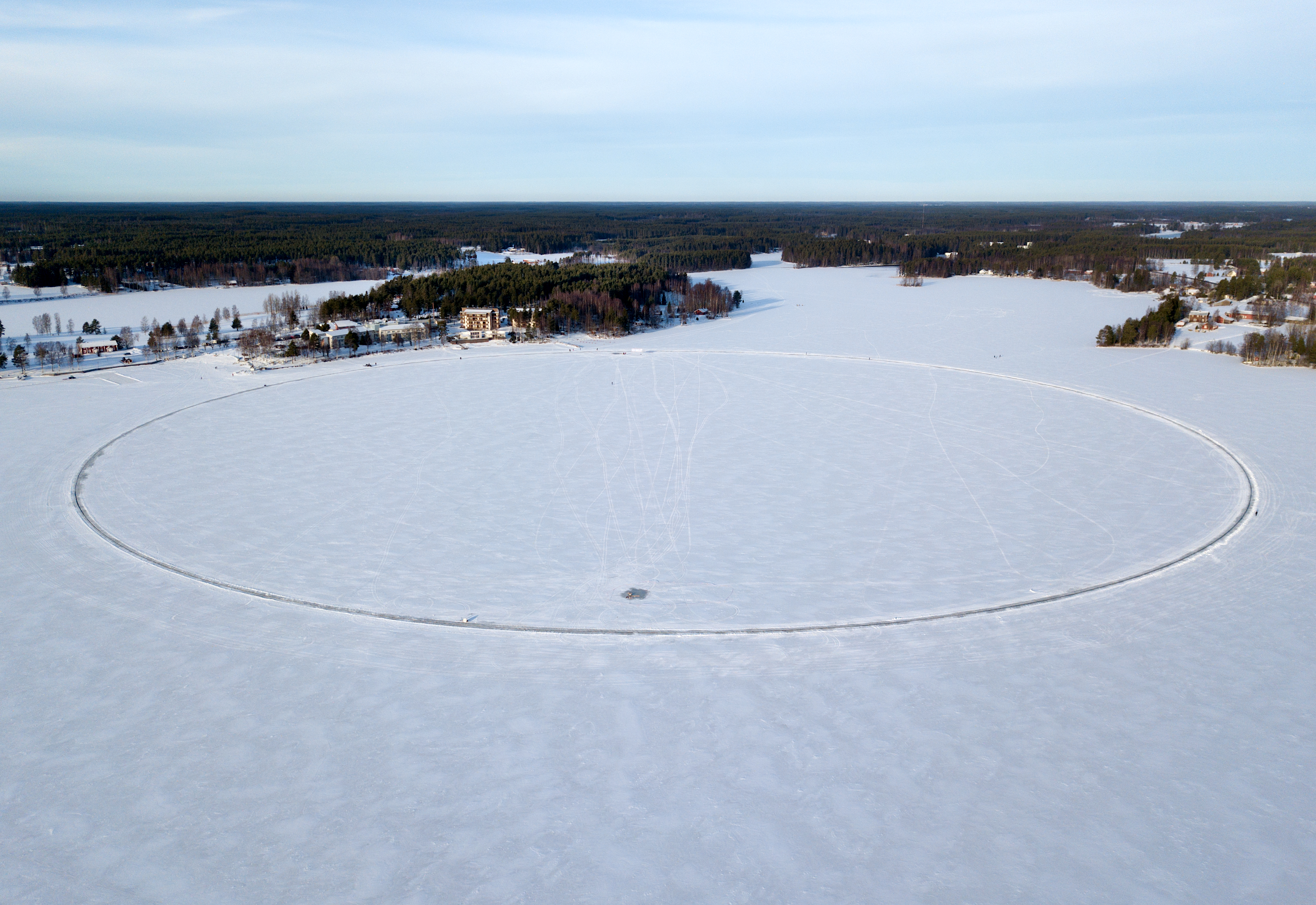
Ice carousel in Lappajärvi, Finland.

An ice carousel is a circular piece of ice made to spin like a carousel within a larger body of water, often a frozen lake. It is a man-made phenomenon, made by cutting the floating ice sheet, unlike the natural rotating ice circles.

== History ==
In 2017, Janne Käpylehto carved one in Lohja, in Finland.

Two men created one in Burntside Lake, near Ely, Minnesota, in 2018.

An ice carousel created in Little Falls, Minnesota, in early 2019 was dubbed the largest in the world.

In December 2019, on a lake in Clerval, Abitibi, Québec, Canada, a team constructed an ice carousel with a diameter of 209.7 m (688 ft 0 in) and an area of 34,307 m^{2} (369,280 sq ft), surpassing the prior record of 155 ft (47 m) set in the United States. The feat was recognized by the World Ice Carousel Association, which keeps track of records.

An even larger ice carousel was cut into Lake Lappajärvi in Finland by Janne Käpylehto's team in February 2023. The carousel has a diameter of 516 m (1,692 ft 11 in).

In April 2023, Volunteers in Madawaska, Maine, United States of America created an even larger ice carousel totaling 1,776 feet in diameter.
