= Berm =

Raised bank of land or barrier

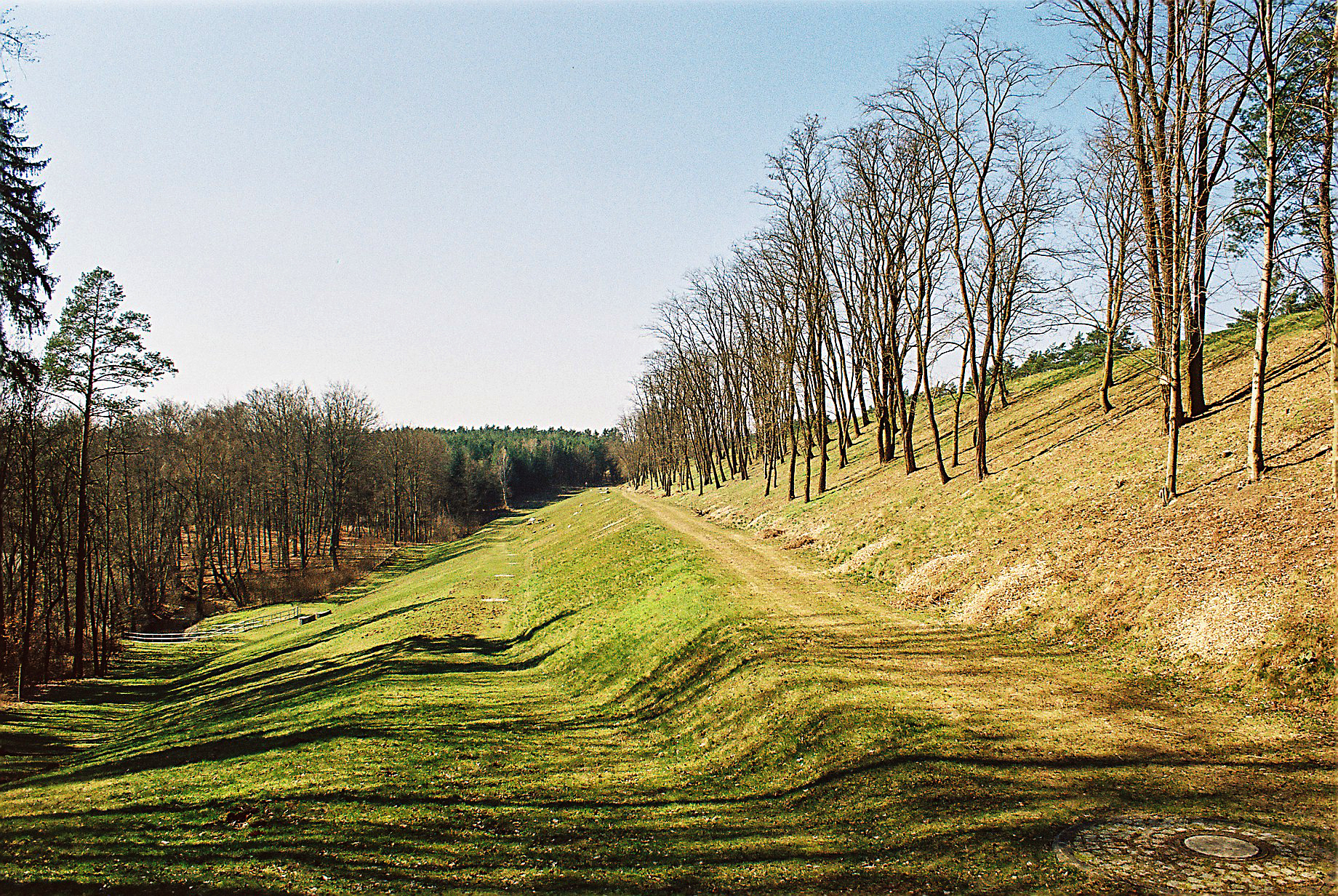
Embankment dam with two berms

A berm is a level space, shelf, or raised barrier (usually made of compacted soil) separating areas in a vertical way, especially partway up a long slope. It can serve as a terrace road, track, path, a fortification line, a border/separation barrier for navigation, good drainage, industry, or other purposes. It can also be used on hunting property. For general applications, a berm is a physical, stationary barrier of some kind.

The word is from Middle Dutch and came into usage in English via French. In coastal geography, a berm is a bank of sand or gravel ridge parallel to the shoreline and a few tens of centimetres high, created by wave action throwing material beyond the average level of the sea. Berms are also used as a method of environmental spill containment and liquid spill control.

== Military use ==
=== History ===
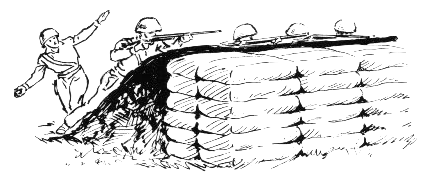
Provisional breastwork (bulwark) with berm and sandbags

In medieval military engineering, a berm (or berme) was a level space between a parapet or defensive wall and an adjacent steep-walled ditch or moat. It was intended to reduce soil pressure on the walls of the excavated part to prevent its collapse. It also meant that debris dislodged from fortifications would not fall into (and fill) a ditch or moat.

In the trench warfare of World War I, the name was applied to a similar feature at the lip of a trench, which served mainly as an elbow-rest for riflemen.

=== Modern usage ===
In modern military engineering, a berm is the earthen or sod wall or parapet, especially a low earthen wall adjacent to a ditch. The digging of the ditch (often by a bulldozer or military engineering vehicle) can provide the soil from which the berm is constructed. Walls constructed in this manner are an obstacle to vehicles, including most armoured fighting vehicles but are easily crossed by infantry. Because of the ease of construction, such walls can be made hundreds or thousands of kilometres long. A prominent example of such a berm is the 2,700 km (1,700 mi) Moroccan Western Sahara Wall.

== Erosion control ==
Berms are also used to control soil erosion and sedimentation by reducing the rate of surface runoff. The berms either reduce the velocity of the water, or direct water to areas that are not susceptible to erosion, thereby reducing the adverse effects of running water on exposed topsoil. Following the 2010 Deepwater Horizon oil spill in the Gulf of Mexico, the construction of berms designed to prevent oil from reaching the fragile Louisiana wetlands (which would result in massive erosion) was proposed early on, and was officially approved by the federal government in mid-June, 2010, after numerous failures to stop and contain the oil leak with more advanced technologies.

== House construction ==
Earth is piled up against exterior walls and packed, sloping down away from the house. The roof may or may not be fully earth covered, and windows/openings may occur on one or more sides of the shelter. Due to the building being above ground, fewer moisture problems are associated with earth berming in comparison to underground/fully recessed construction.

== Other applications ==
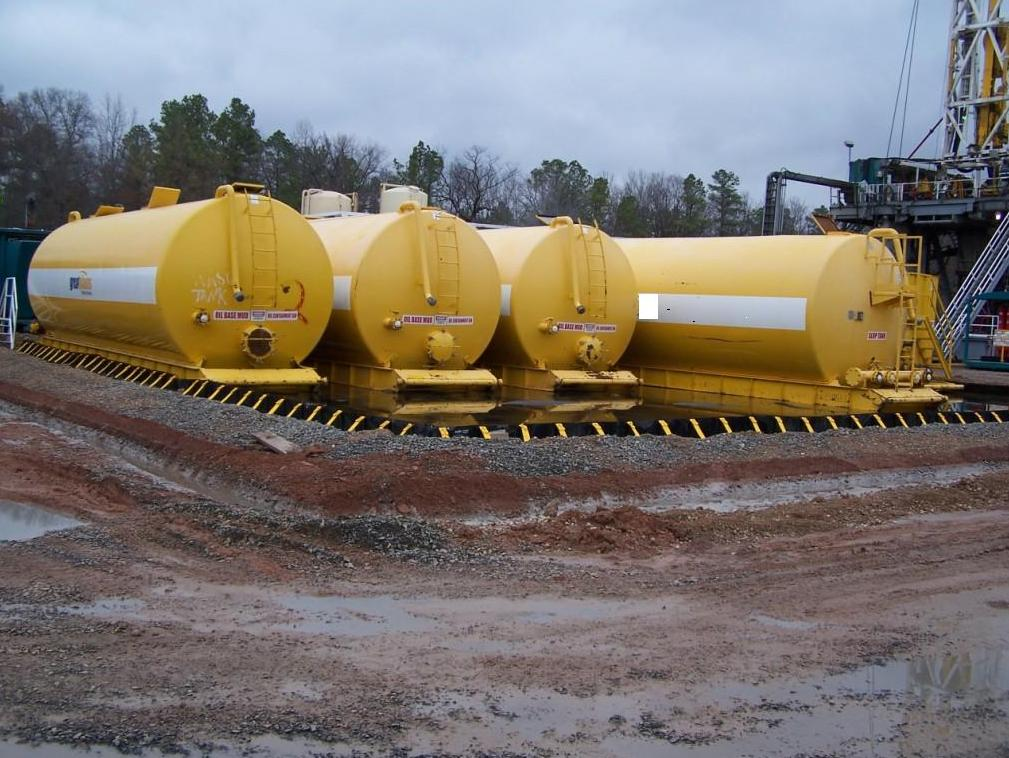
A typical berm application

In highway construction, a berm is a noise barrier constructed of earth, often landscaped, running along a highway to protect adjacent land users from noise pollution. The shoulder of a road is also called a berm and in New Zealand the word describes a publicly owned grassed nature strip sometimes planted with trees alongside urban roads (usually called a verge). In snowboard cross, a berm is a wall of snow built up in a corner. In mountain biking, a berm is a banked turn formed by soil, commonly dug from the track, being deposited on the outer rim of the turn. In coastal systems, a berm is a raised ridge of pebbles or sand found at high tide or storm tide marks on a beach. In snow removal, a berm or windrow refers to the linear accumulation of snow cast aside by a plow. Earth berms are used above particle accelerator tunnels to provide shielding from radiation. In open-pit mining, a berm refers to dirt and rock piled alongside a haulage road or along the edge of a dump point. Intended as a safety measure, they are commonly required by government organizations to be at least half as tall as the wheels of the largest mining machine on-site.

Physical security systems employ berms to exclude hostile vehicles and slow attackers on foot (similar to the military application without the trench). Security berms are common around military and nuclear facilities. An example is the berm proposed for Vermont Yankee nuclear power plant in Vermont. At Baylor Ballpark, a baseball stadium on the campus of Baylor University, a berm is constructed down the right field line. The berm replaces bleachers, and general admission tickets are sold for fans who wish to sit on the grass or watch the game from the top of the hill.

Bunding is the construction of a secondary impermeable barrier around and beneath storage or processing plant, sufficient to contain the plant's volume after a spill. This is often achieved on large sites by surrounding the plant with a berm. The US Environmental Protection Agency (EPA) requires that oils and fuels stored over certain volume levels be placed in secondary spill containment. Berms for spill containment are typically manufactured from polyvinyl chloride (PVC) or geomembrane fabric that provide a barrier to keep spills from reaching the ground or navigable waterways. Most berms have sidewalls to keep liquids contained for future capture and safe disposal.

== See also ==
- Bund
- Earthworks (engineering)
- Flood-meadow
- Floodplain
- Limes (Roman Empire)
- Long acre
- Marches
- Moroccan Wall
- Road verge
