= Carrousel (booklet) =

Booklet of short texts written by Vladimir Nabokov

First edition

Carrousel is a booklet published in 1987 containing three short texts written by Vladimir Nabokov in 1923 for "Karussel", a Russian cabaret.

== Content ==
The three texts are:

- "Laughter and Dreams" (by Vladimir V. Nabokoff), a short and impressionistic essay on the arts, toys, and the cabaret.
- "Painted Wood" (by V. Cantaboff), an essay in the same vein on wooden toys and the cabaret.
- "The Russian Song" (by Vladimir Sirine), a short and nostalgic poem.

"Cantaboff" of course refers to "Cantab." and the author's recent graduation from Trinity College, Cambridge; "Sirine" was Nabokov's occasional French spelling for "Sirin", his early Russian pseudonym.

Brian Boyd regards the poem as "banal", the prose as "masterly".

== Publication ==
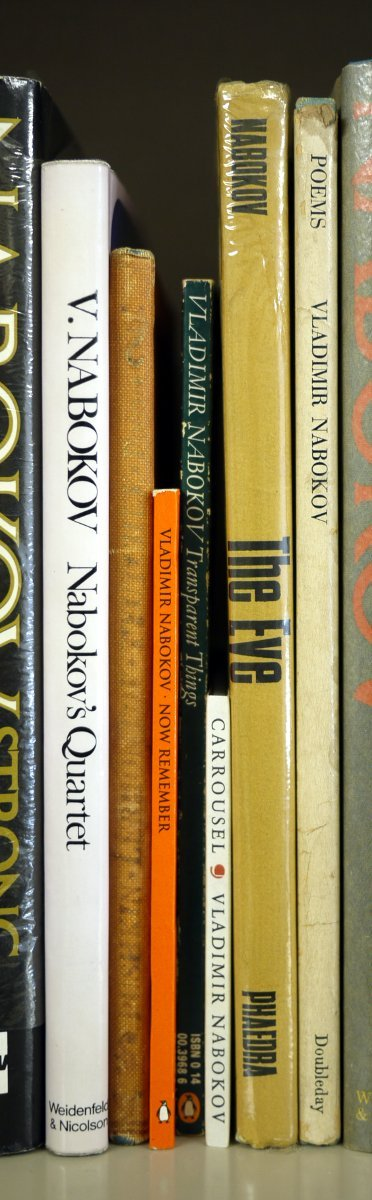
Some books by Nabokov, including the first edition of Carrousel (the one nominally limited to 100 copies)

The only known previous appearance of these three texts had been within the second issue of a trilingual (German, French, English) brochure, Karussel – Carousal – Carrousel, published in Berlin in 1923 as the prospectus for "Karussel", a Russian theatre travelling to Berlin.

Stella de Does-Kohnhorst discovered a copy of this rare prospectus, gave it to the Nabokov family, and asked for and obtained their permission to publish the contributions by Nabokov.

There have been two editions, both designed by Bram de Does and published in 1987 by Spectatorpers in Aartswoud (the Netherlands). Both claim to be "limited" (to 100 copies of the first, and 150 of the second), but copies of both with "HC" in place of the number are known, suggesting larger numbers. The publisher's note to the first edition explains the reason for the two editions: a detailed "Introductory Note" by Dmitri Nabokov, the author's son, had arrived too late for inclusion in the first. Thus the first edition lacks this note; the second, which is in a larger format, includes it. The first edition – of which Michael Juliar has stated (without explanation) that "Thirty or so copies survive" – is a paperback that was not offered for sale; the revised edition was made available in hardbound and paperback versions.
