= Foam line =

Accumulations of foam on the surface of freshwater water courses or bodies

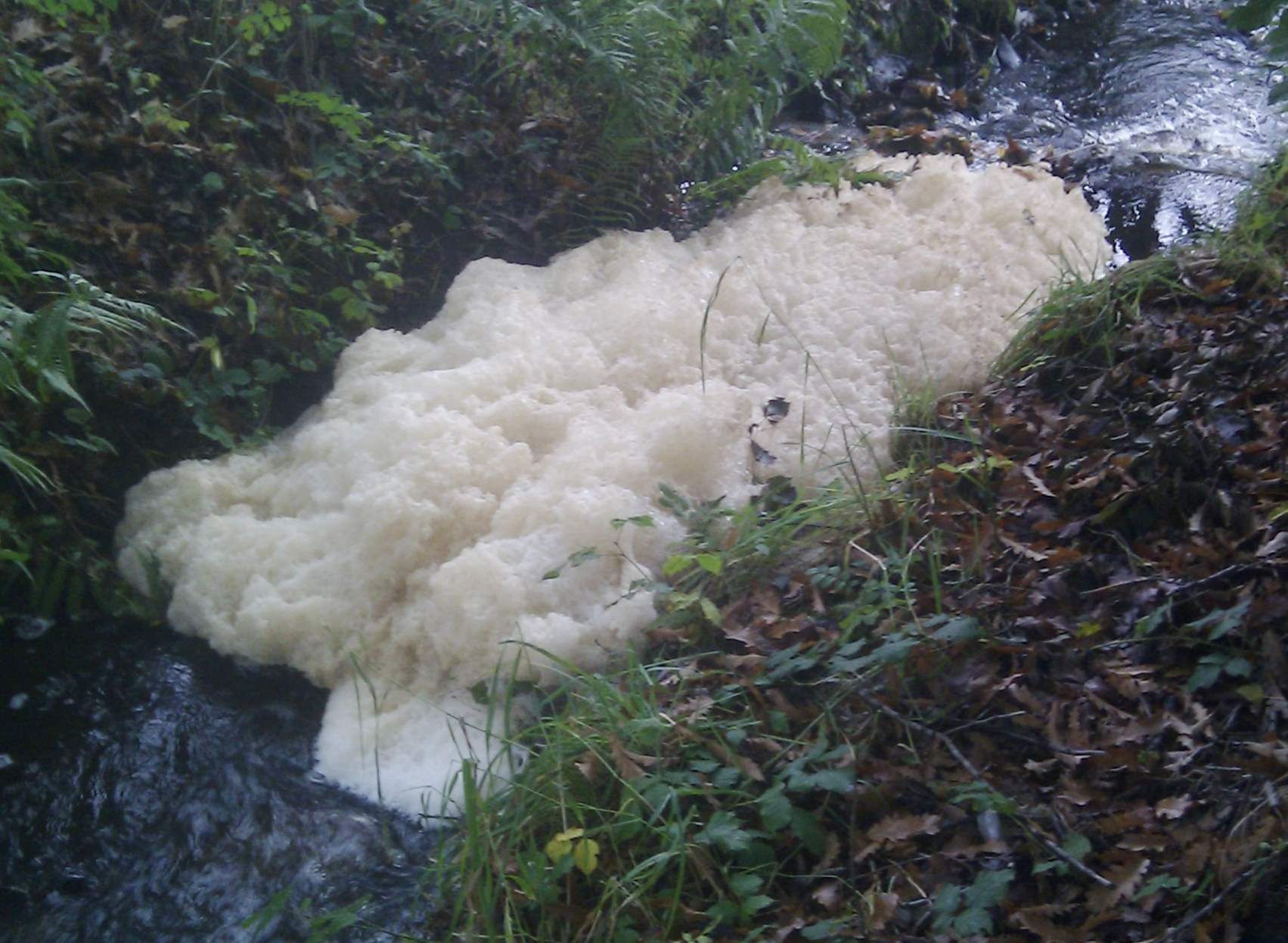
Foam lines on the Vale Burn, Barrmill, North Ayrshire.

Foam lines are accumulations of foam, with trapped insects, exuvia, etc. found on the surface of freshwater water courses or bodies. Lines appear as individual islands of foam that accumulate against obstructions, shorelines, etc. Foam lines have some characteristics in common with sea foam from the marine environment which may form lines of spume as the tides rise and fall.

== Characteristics ==
=== Foam lines ===
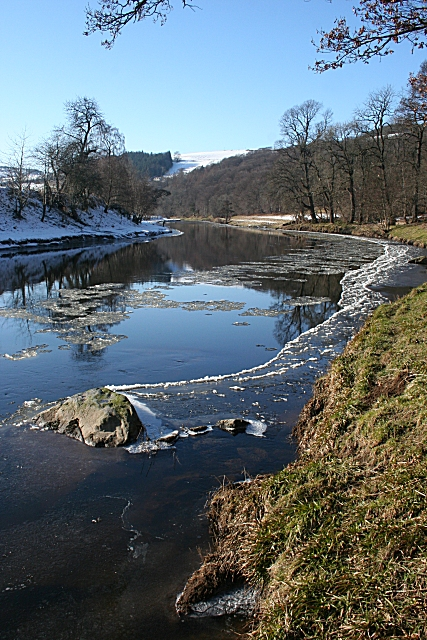
Ice sheet and 'ice pancakes' on the River Deveron.

Most foam is very light, white to start with, often turning brown after a period of time if sediment builds up and forms discernible lines as individual mats accumulate. Foam lines are usually non-toxic. Natural foam may have an earthy or fishy smell and is white, off-white, becoming brownish; characteristically it breaks apart with comparative ease when disturbed.

=== Ice pancakes ===
Dinner plate sized 'ice pancake' discs are sometimes seen in the winter and can reportedly have a thickness of up to 3.9 inches with a diameter of 12 inches to 9ft. It is thought that the foam lines on the water freeze at night with the current causing repeated collisions against each other to eventually become circular with a distinct rim. When the temperatures fall again fresh foam is added so that existing 'pancakes' enlarge and new ones form.

== Formation ==
Dissolved organic carbon (DOC) compounds include natural organic surfactants which reduce the surface tension of water and permit the formation of foam bubbles. DOCs derived from decomposing algae and other plants in water courses are one important source, however DOCs derived from bogs and wetlands are very important. Brown-water streams with brown water contain high levels of DOC and much of the foam forms after snowmelt, after prolonged heavy rains and in autumn. The foam decreases quickly when water flow reduces.

=== Natural pollution ===
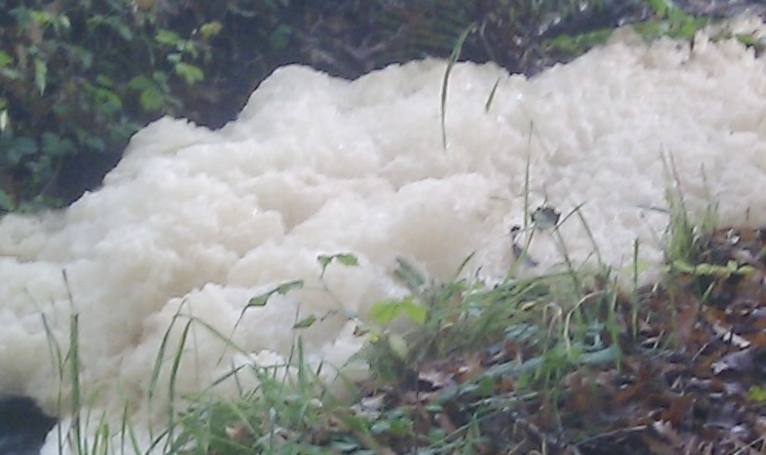
Detail of the foam

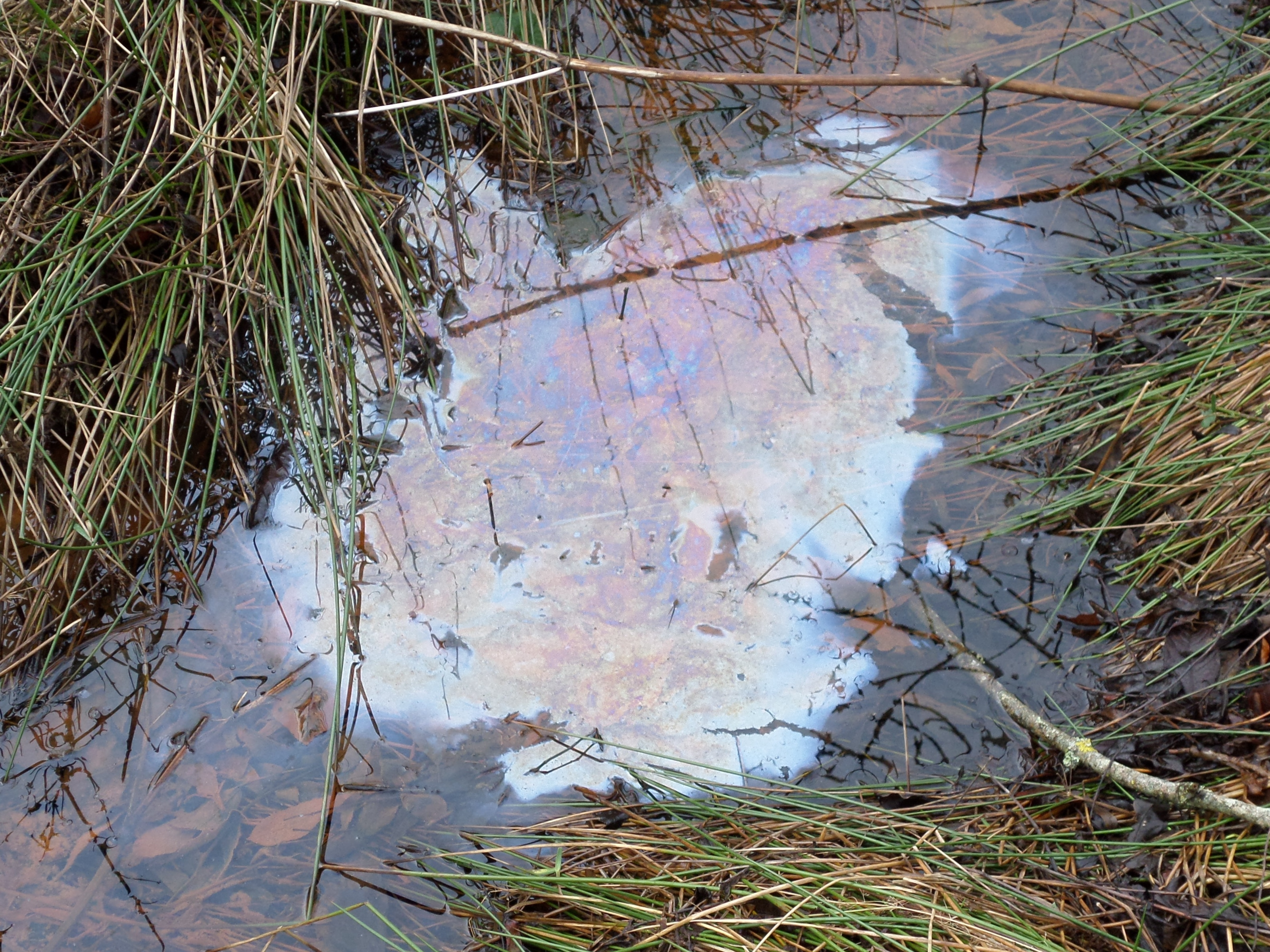
An oily sheen of 'iron bacteria' that contribute to the formation of foam lines

Foam lines are found on stream and river surfaces and banks when water is strongly mixed with air at waterfalls and where rocky substrates have fast currents of water passing over them. Loch or lake shores accumulate foam lines due to waves breaking against rocky substrates and outcrops. As stated, decaying plants and animals release dissolved organic compounds and these compounds lessen the surface tension of water to create the bubbles that adhere together to form the foam. Unlike with man-made pollution, the foam lines are found along long stretches as no one source exists.

=== Man-made pollution ===
The reduction of effluents from wastewater treatment plants and the introduction of biodegradable detergents have greatly reduced the incidence of pollution-related foam, the presence of which can be ascertained by a fragrant or perfume-like smell. The foam lines are restricted to the part of the water course in the vicinity of the source of the pollution.

== Biotic and abiotic effects ==
Stillborn, emerging and drowned terrestrial insects progressively accumulate within foam lines in summer, trapped and held in place by the surface tension of the bubbles within. These dense foam lines restrict the penetration of sunlight.

The foam lines vary in thickness and this creates an overhead shelter that protects fish and insects from birds and other 'above surface' predators.

== See also ==
- Ice circle – Rotating slab of ice on slow-moving water
