= Walter K. Lew =

Korean-American poet and scholar

Walter K. Lew is a poet, editor, and scholar. He has taught creative writing, East Asian literatures, and Asian American literature at Brown University, Cornell University, Mills College, the University of Miami, and UCLA. Aside from the award-winning Treadwinds: Poems and Intermedia Texts, Lew is the author, co-author, or editor of seven books and several special journal issues and artist's books. Lew's translations and scholarship on Korean literature and Asian American literature have been widely anthologized and he was the first U.S. artist to revive the art of movietelling (live narration of silent films), beginning in 1982.

Lew was the founding editor of the literary and scholarly press, Kaya Production (1993–96), where he solicited, developed, and published such books as R. Zamora Linmark's Rolling the R's, Kimiko Hahn's Unbearable Heart, Sesshu Foster's City Terrace Field Manual, and a new edition of Younghill Kang's East Goes West: The Making of an Oriental Yankee.

Lew's documentaries and news stories have been broadcast on CBS News, PBS, British ITV, and NHK-Japan. He has often collaborated with visual artists, such as O Woomi Chung, Ashley Ford, and, most continually, the filmmaker Lewis Klahr.

Lew presently resides in Brooklyn, New York and Bethlehem, Pennsylvania after several years in Seoul and Tokyo.

== Works ==
- SCROTA, with O Woomi Chung, limited edition chapbook, 2014
- WITH EYES CLOSED, with O Woomi Chung, site-specific video installations, 2014
- IMPERATIVES OF CULTURE: Selected Essays on Korean History, Literature, and Society from the Japanese Colonial Era (Ed. with Christopher P. Hanscom and Youngju Ryu), University of Hawai'i Press, 2013
- EST-CE QUE LA LIGNE A ASSASSINE LE CIRCLE?, with Ashley Ford, limited edition artist's book, 2011
- YI WON, a selection of Yi Won's poetry translated by Walter K. Lew and published as a chapbook for the 35th Poetry International Festival, Poetry International, Rotterdam, 2004.
- TREADWINDS: Poems and Intermedia Texts, Wesleyan University Press, 2002
- EXCERPTS FROM: ∆IKTH DIKTE 딕테/딕티 for DICTEE (1982), Yeuleum Sa (Seoul), 1991
- "Pack Observing Art Basel >< Miami Beach 2008," (Ed., with Alan R. Clinton), "Avant-garde as Critical Practice" issue of RECONSTRUCTION 9.2 (2009)
- KÔRI: The Beacon Anthology of Korean American Fiction (Ed., Comment., with Heinz Insu Fenkl), Beacon Press, 2001
- CRAZY MELON and CHINESE APPLE: The Poems of Frances Chung (Ed., Comment.), Wesleyan University Press, 2000
- PREMONITIONS: The Kaya Anthology of New Asian North American Poetry (Ed.), Kaya Production, 1995
- MUAE: A Journal of Transcultural Production (Ed., Trans.), Kaya Production, 1995–1996
- "The Fight for Democracy" (Associate producer), part 8 (Dir. Carl Byker), of the Emmy Award-winning 10-part documentary series The Pacific Century, Prod. Peter Bull and Alex Gibney, 1992. Also awarded an Alfred I. duPont–Columbia University Award.

== Awards ==
- Asian American Literary Award, poetry category, The Asian American Writers' Workshop, 2003
- PEN Center USA Literary Award, finalist, poetry, PEN Center USA, 2002
- Inter-Arts Fellowship, with Lewis Klahr, National Endowment for the Arts, 1990

== See also ==
- 1995 in poetry
