= The Reverend =

Christian religious honorific style

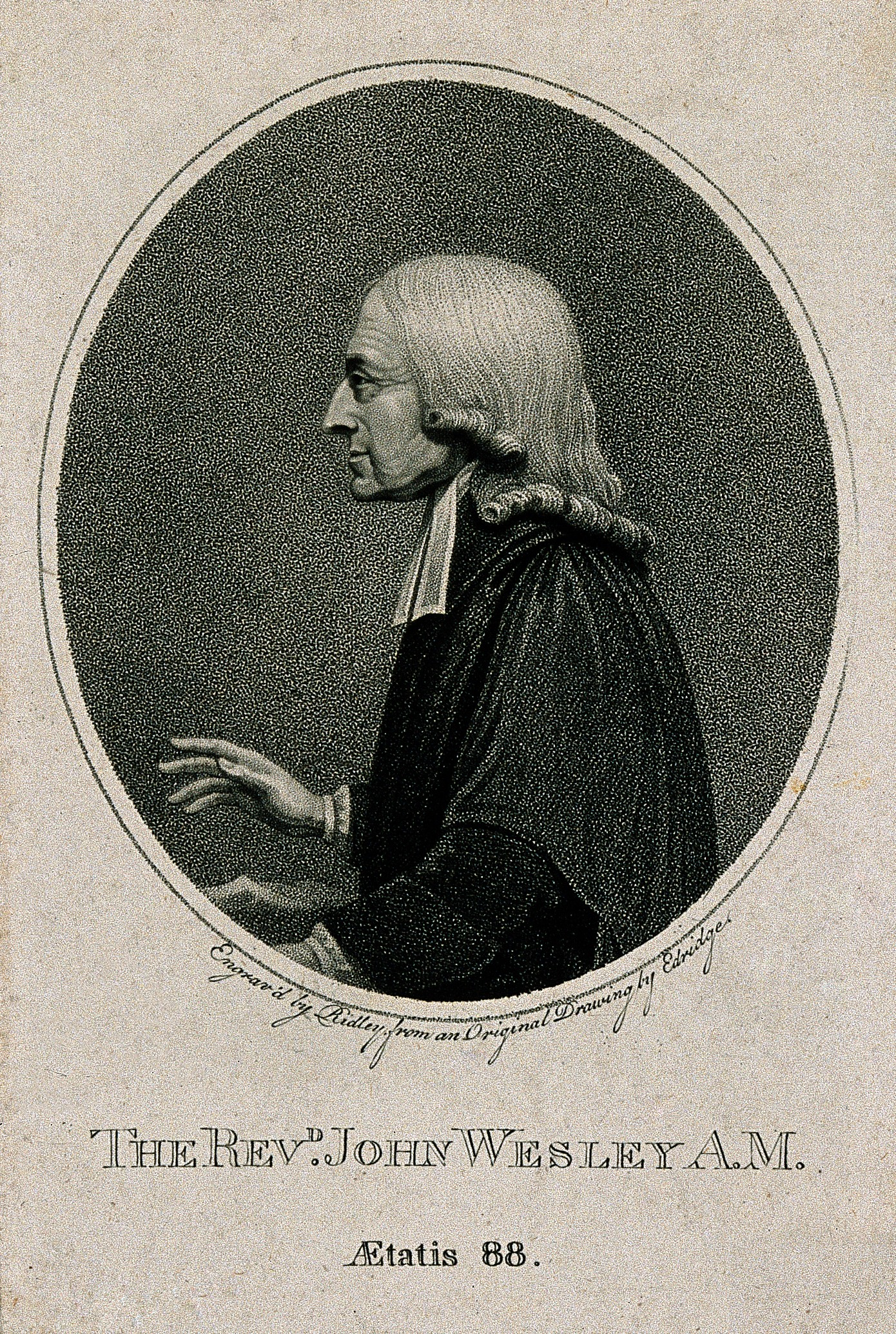
Profile of John Wesley, a major religious leader of the 18th century. He is styled The Rev^{d}., an abbreviation of "The Reverend".

The Reverend (abbreviated as The Revd, The Rev'd or The Rev) is an honorific style given to certain (primarily Western) Christian clergy and ministers. There are sometimes differences in the way the style is used in different countries and church traditions. The Reverend is correctly called a style, but is sometimes referred to as a title, form of address, or title of respect.

== Etymology ==
The term is an anglicisation of the Latin reverendus, the style originally used in Latin documents in medieval Europe. It is the gerundive or future passive participle of the verb revereri ("to respect; to revere"), meaning "[one who is] to be revered/must be respected". The Reverend is therefore equivalent to the Honourable or the Venerable.

Originating as a general term of respectful address in the 15th century, it became particularly associated with clergy by the 17th century, with variations associated with certain ranks in the church. It is paired with a modifier or noun for some offices in some traditions: Lutheran archbishops, Anglican archbishops, and most Catholic bishops are usually styled The Most Reverend (reverendissimus); other Lutheran bishops, Anglican bishops, and Catholic bishops are styled The Right Reverend.

The forms His Reverence and Her Reverence are also sometimes used, along with their parallel in direct address, Your Reverence.

== Usage ==
In traditional and formal English usage it is still considered incorrect to drop the definite article, the, before Reverend. In practice, however, the the is often not used in both written and spoken English. When the style is used within a sentence, the is correctly in lower-case. Abbreviations for Reverend include Rev., Revd (or Rev^{d}), and Rev'd.

The Reverend is traditionally used as an adjectival form with first names (or initials) and surname, e.g. "the Reverend John Smith" or "the Reverend J. F. Smith"; if the first names (or initials) are unknown, the correct form is "The Reverend Mr./Mrs./Miss/Ms. Smith". Use of the prefix with the surname alone, e.g. "The Reverend Smith", is incorrect (a solecism) in formal usage. The style normally precedes titles such as Canon or Doctor.

In the 20th and 21st centuries, it has been increasingly common for the term to be used as a noun and for clergy to be referred to as being either a reverend or the reverend, or to be addressed as simply reverend. This has traditionally been considered incorrect on the basis that it is equivalent to referring to a judge as being an honourable or an adult man as a mister, both of which are also grammatically improper. It is likewise incorrect to form the plural reverends. Some dictionaries, however, do place the noun rather than the adjective as the word's principal form, owing to an increasing use of the word as a noun among people with no religious background or knowledge of traditional styles of ecclesiastical address. When several clergy are referred to, they are often styled individually (e.g. "The Reverend John Smith and the Reverend Henry Brown"); in a list of clergy, the Revv is sometimes put before the list of names, especially in the Catholic Church in Britain and Ireland.

In a unique case, the Reverend was used to refer to a church consistory, a local administrative body. "The Reverend Coetus" and "the Reverend Assembly" were used to refer to the collective body of local officials during the transformation of the Dutch Reformed Church in the mid-18th century.

=== Other religions ===
The use of the Christian term "Reverend" for the rabbi of a congregation was common in Reform Judaism in the 19th and early 20th centuries; however, the Central Conference of American Rabbis deprecated this usage in 1897.

The style is also sometimes used by leaders in other religions such as Buddhism.

== See also ==
- Ecclesiastical titles and styles
- Grace (style)
- His Holiness
- The Venerable
- The Very Reverend
