= Solecism =

Phrase that transgresses the rules of grammar

A solecism is a phrase that transgresses the rules of grammar. The term is often used in the context of linguistic prescription; it also occurs descriptively in the context of a lack of idiomaticness.

== Etymology ==
The word originally was used by the Greeks for what they perceived as grammatical mistakes in their language. Ancient Athenians considered the dialect of the inhabitants of Soli, Cilicia to be a corrupted form of their pure Attic dialect and labelled the errors in the form as "solecisms" (Greek: σολοικισμοί, soloikismoí; sing.: σολοικισμός, soloikismós). Therefore, when referring to similar grammatical mistakes heard in the speech of Athenians, they described them as "solecisms" and that term has been adopted as a label for grammatical mistakes in any language; in Greek there is often a distinction in the relevant terms in that a mistake in semantics (i.e., a use of words with other-than-appropriate meaning or a neologism constructed through application of generative rules by an outsider) is called a barbarism (βαρβαρισμός barbarismos), whereas solecism refers to mistakes in syntax, in the construction of sentences.

== Examples ==
| Name | Type of grammatical breach | Example |
|---|---|---|
| Catachresis | Wrong grammatical case | "This is just between you and I" for "This is just between you and me" (hypercorrection to avoid the correct "you and me" form in the predicate of copulative sentences, even though "me" is the standard pronoun for the object of a preposition or the object of a verb). "Whom shall I say is calling?" for "Who shall I say is calling?" (hypercorrection resulting from the perception that "whom" is a formal version of "who" or that the pronoun is functioning as an object when, in fact, it is the subject [one would say, "Shall I say who is calling?]. The leading pronoun could be an object only if "say" were used transitively and the sentence were structured thus: "Whom shall I say to be calling?") |
| Catachresis | Double negative | "She can't hardly sleep" for "She can hardly sleep" (a double negative, as both "can't" and "hardly" have a negative meaning) |

== See also ==
- English as She Is Spoke
- Fowler's Modern English Usage
- Catachresis
- Disputed English grammar
- Error (linguistics)
- Malapropism
- Prescription and description
- Zeugma, a rhetorical use of solecism for effect
- See Wiktionary: solecism, Noun 2. for secondary use.
- Barbarism (linguistics)
