= DNW =

DNW may refer to:

- Diocese of New Westminster (Anglican), one of six dioceses of the Ecclesiastical Province of British Columbia and the Yukon
- Do not want, an internet meme
- Noonans Mayfair, formerly Dix Noonan Webb

== See also ==
- dnw, ISO 639-3 code of the Western Dani language
