= Dominik Kuhn =

German producer, comedian, director and musician (born 1969)

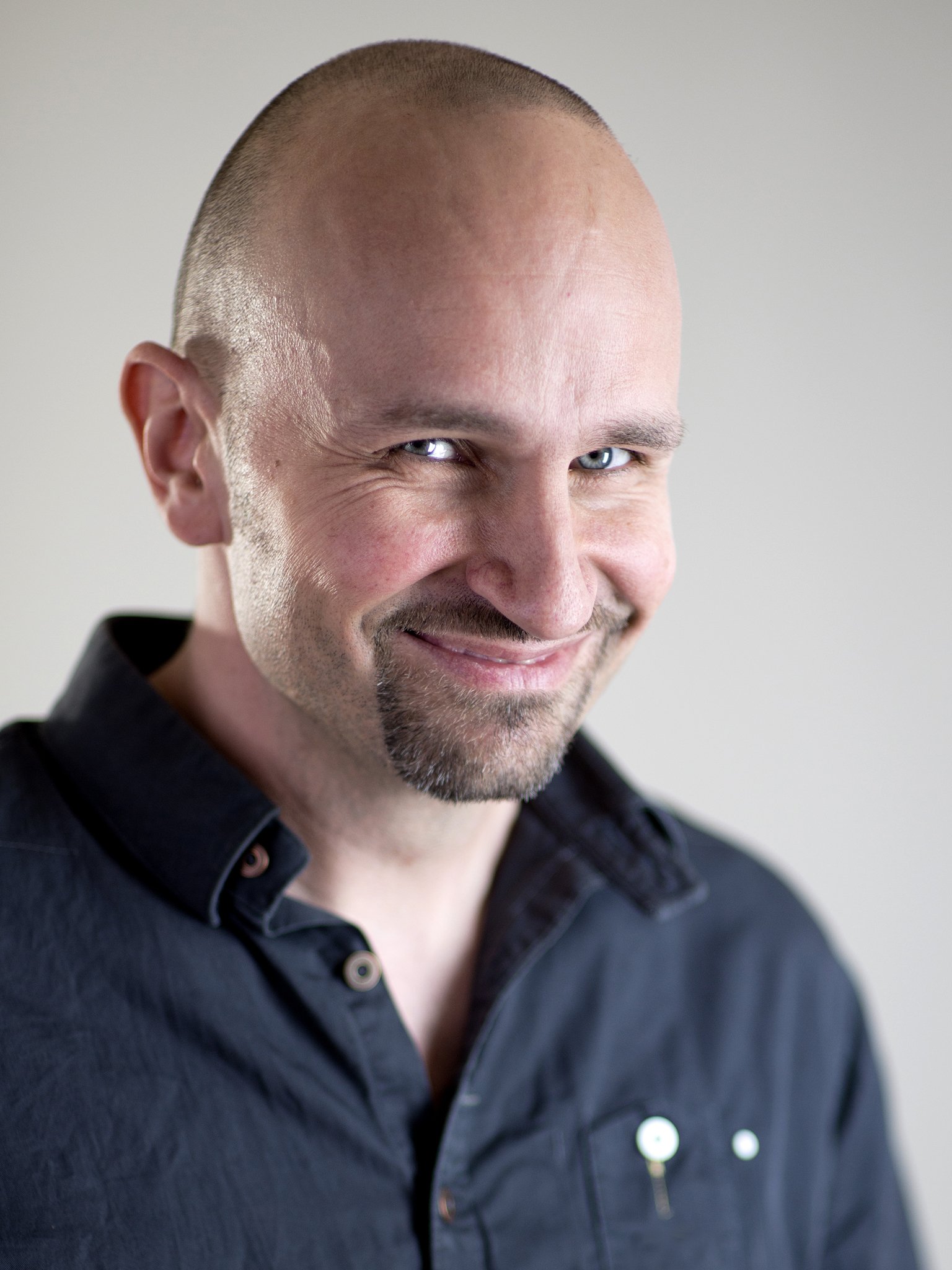
- Born: Dominik Kuhn; 16 September 1969 (age 56); Reutlingen
- Occupations: Producer, language artist, comedian, director, musician
- Known for: Swabian fandub videos

Dominik Kuhn (pseudonym: Dodokay; born September 16, 1969) is a German producer, language artist, comedian, director and musician. He is the owner of the production company STARPATROL Entertainment.

He got famous in Germany with Swabian fandub videos, synchronising, among others, the Dalai Lama or Barack Obama in Swabian German dialect.

== Biography ==
Dominik Kuhn was raised in Reutlingen. He did his Abitur in 1989. While in school, he started a rental company for event technology and worked simultaneously at a local radio station as music editor, DJ and sound technician. Later, he also worked as an independent audio engineer and started producing radio commercials and music, before he began to producing films. He produced some commercials and low-budget films and worked as an actor, especially in regional productions.

He translated a couple of science fiction novels for Dino Verlag in Stuttgart, among others for the Star Wars series and the German version of Magic: The Gathering. Dominik Kuhn speaks Dutch and English.

Using a pseudonym, Dodokay, Kuhn got famous with Swabian fandub videos, which have been published on various video sites such as YouTube, Clipfish and MyVideo. In 2007, a Star Wars parody about viral marketing in Stuttgart found hundreds of thousands of fans. Despite some copyright conflicts, he gained fame in the mainstream media and quickly received offers to do such spots professionally. In the case of the Star Wars video, Kuhn also made a version in "Swabian English".

In 2008 he started to produce a fandub news parody, called Die Welt auf Schwäbisch (The World in Swabian), for one of Germany's public broadcaster SWR's TV channel SWR Fernsehen. The original text is not translated but completely changed. Among the news report clips featured were Windows 'Swabian edition' with former French president Nicolas Sarkozy explaining software features and Hillary Clinton doing the weather report. Kuhn found new tasks coaching various celebrities and actors in Swabian and was asked to work and lecture on viral marketing campaigns. A B2B video for IBM, about the "LAN-Ball", an allegedly remote-controlled football, is among his professional campaigns. Dodokay also created fandubs of Barack Obama's 2009 and 2013 Berlin speeches; in both version he placed Obama in front of an assembly of home owners in a Stuttgart mansion.

Similarly, rather Swabian problems with neighbors cleaning the car at 5:30 in the morning were used for a fandub of the Dalai Lama. German public broadcaster ZDF used Kuhn's fandub of a Romney-Obama TV discussion to start reporting about the outcome of the 2012 US presidential election. Another German public broadcaster ARD had a Silvio Berlusconi phone call leading to embarrassment during a NATO summit 2009 fandubbed by dodokay.

Kuhn is a jury member for the Kurd-Laßwitz-Preis for German science fiction.

== Awards ==
He received the Friedrich-E. Vogt Medal for his work promoting the Swabian dialect.
