= Profanity in American Sign Language =

American Sign Language (ASL), the sign language used by the deaf community throughout most of North America, has a rich vocabulary of terms, which include profanity. Within deaf culture, there is a distinction drawn between signs used to curse versus signs that are used to describe sexual acts. In usage, signs to describe detailed sexual behavior are highly taboo due to their graphic nature. As for the signs themselves, some signs do overlap, but they may also vary according to usage. For example, the sign for "shit" when used to curse is different from the sign for "shit" when used to describe the bodily function or the fecal matter.

== Examples ==
- The back of dominant open b-handshape flipped out under chin literally means "so what?" Using a middle finger as the 'classic' flipping of the bird has a different meaning. In the 1980s, the myth was made that the b-handshape flipped under the chin was a sign of saying "Fuck you". Some linguists contend that when the middle finger is used directionally, and pointed at someone or something, it becomes a sign. Another common sign for "fuck" uses an "FK" abbreviation, signed with an f-handshape changing to a k-handshape, which is referred to as a "loan sign". A "loan sign" is when a fingerspelled word is modified to leave out letters, form a specific shape, or move in a specific direction to become an actual sign(1).
- "Whore," "slut," or "prostitute" is signed by waving an open hand on the side of the chin front to back (fingers cupped in a c form, but thumb out). The hand passes below and to the side of the chin twice. More commonly, the back of the "B" hand brushes the cheek, twice.
- "Dick" is a "d" handshape tapping the nose.
- The thumb/index finger side of a b-handshape struck against the chin means "bitch" (contact point is the side of the index finger). "Bastard" can be produced by doing the same sign but locating it on the forehead. The sign for "bitch" is often confused for the English sign "be" or the sign "breakfast".
- Touching the p-handshape middle finger to the nose tip then bringing it out to "F" (done with one hand) means "piss off". This sign creates the meaning of "piss off" by combining the sign for "penis/piss" and abbreviating "O-F-F" by using simply one "F".
- "Fuck" as a sexual connotation is signed by taking two v-shaped hands and tapping them twice (dominant hand on top) to emulate two people's legs. This sign also means "sex". The diction is determined by nonmanual markers. This sign is often confused for "gender".
- The word "fuck" as in "fuck you" is signed by holding the middle finger towards someone and then pointing it at them.
- Holding a d-handshape in front of the body with the index finger pointing somewhat forward and to the left and the palm pointing somewhat down, then shoving the hand quickly down and to the right in an arc as if condemning someone to hell signifies "damn" The sign properly ends pointing mostly down and off to the right a bit. Doing this sign with an "H" means "hell".
- A common misconception is the sign for "bullshit". Signed with both arms held out, elbows bent, and folded in front of the signer with the dominant forearm on top, the dominant hand mimics a pair of horns with the index and pinkie finger. The non-dominant hand mimics the "business end" with flapping fingers. This sign is not considered part of ASL. It is, however, part of New Zealand Sign Language. The correct sign in ASL is performed with both the pointer and pinkie finger being extended and thrusting the hand forward to signify "bullshit". An alternative is to make a "C" around the nose, rotate the "C", and then close the hand in a fist and face the palm to the nose. These signs are, however, not used as jokes. To sign the equivalent of a joking "that's BS," you simply sign the letters B-S.
- The well-known OK gesture, when held with the thumb on top at the level of the chest means "asshole", as seen in the film Mr. Holland's Opus. Asshole can also be signed by tapping an A on the side of the head twice. Also, by rocking "F" sign downward from the wrist, twice.
- The common sign for the noun "shit" is the thumbs-up signal with one hand, the other hand grasping the thumb and pulling upwards. The exclamation "shit" is signed by jamming the thumb of the dominant hand, on top, into a fist on the other hand.

== See also ==
American Sign Language/Profanity at Wikibooks

- Idioms in American Sign Language
- The finger – Obscene raising of the middle finger
