= Charles Kinbote =

Fictional character in the novel Pale Fire

Charles Kinbote is a fictional character who acts as the unreliable narrator in Vladimir Nabokov's novel Pale Fire.

== Academic work ==
Kinbote appears to be the scholarly author of the foreword, commentary and index surrounding the text of the late John Shade's poem "Pale Fire," which together form the text of Nabokov's novel. In the course of initially academic but increasingly deranged annotations to Shade's text, Kinbote's writing reveals a comic melange of narcissism and megalomania: he believes himself to be a royal figure, the exiled king of Zembla and the real target of the gunman who has in fact murdered Shade. Using the scholarly apparatus of reference and commentary, Kinbote first intertwines his own story with the commentary on Shade's poem, then allows the poem to slide into the background and his perhaps delusional world to move into the spotlight; as Kinbote had hoped John Shade would produce a poem about Zembla's exiled king, this shift provides some satisfaction for Kinbote.

== Zembla ==
Kinbote's "distant northern land" may or may not exist in the world of the novel. In one interpretation, Kinbote is in fact a failed Eastern European academic probably named Vseslav Botkin, teaching at the same university as Shade. Botkin is desperate for recognition, ridiculed by most of the staff. Shade alone feels pity for him and occasionally indulges Kinbote in long walks around New Wye, the college town where they live.

The concept of a land called Zembla originates in Epistle II of Alexander Pope's An Essay On Man, which includes the cryptic lines:

Ask where's the North! at York, 'tis on the Tweed;

In Scotland at the Orcades; and there

At Greenland, Zembla, or the Lord knows where:

== Structure and Pale Fire's author ==
The novel's reflexive structure, where neither Kinbote nor Shade truly holds the final word, coupled with apparent allusions to Kinbote's story in the poem, enables critics to debate multiple authorship theories for Pale Fire. These theories include the idea that Shade created Kinbote and penned the commentary himself, as well as the opposing view that Kinbote created Shade. Brian Boyd's book Pale Fire: The Magic of Artistic Discovery thoroughly explores the authorship and interpretive options, eventually settling on a thesis involving intervention in the text by both Shade and his daughter Hazel after their respective deaths. Mary McCarthy, in her 1962 New Republic essay "A Bolt from the Blue" (in which she classed Pale Fire "one of the great works of art of the century"), identified the book's author as Professor V. Botkin. Nabokov himself endorsed this reading, including in a list of possible interview answers at the end of his 1962 diary, "I wonder if any reader will notice the following details: 1) that the nasty commentator is not an ex-king and not even Dr. Kinbote, but Prof. Vseslav Botkin, a Russian and a madman ..."

== Cultural influences ==
- A character was named after Kinbote in The X-Files episode "Jose Chung's From Outer Space".
