= Backstroke of the West =

2005 bootleg of Revenge of the Sith

Star War: The Third Gathers – The Backstroke of the West
- Screenshot from the bootleg showing the machine-translated subtitle "Do not want", a rendering of Darth Vader's "Nooooooo!" line
- Simplified Chinese: 星球大战：第三集 - 西斯的反击
- Hanyu Pinyin: xīngqiú dàzhàn: dì sān jí - xīsī de fǎnjī
- Directed by: George Lucas (original)
- Written by: George Lucas (original)
- Based on: Star Wars: Episode III – Revenge of the Sith by George Lucas
- Music by: John Williams (original)
- Release date: 2005
- Running time: 140 minutes
- Countries: China (bootleg); United States (fandub)
- Languages: Chinglish (machine-translated subtitles from Chinese); English (fandub)

Star War: The Third Gathers – The Backstroke of the West, (Note: The full title as it appears in the bootleg's machine-translated subtitles) more commonly known as Backstroke of the West, is a 2005 Chinese bootleg DVD of the film Star Wars: Episode III – Revenge of the Sith that became an internet meme for its poor machine-translated English subtitles. The bootleg first gained attention in June 2005 shortly after its release, when American blogger Jeremy Winterson purchased a copy at a Shanghai market and shared screenshots on his personal blog.

The literal machine translation from Chinese to English resulted in bizarre mistranslations, most notably renaming Anakin Skywalker to "Allah Gold", Obi-Wan Kenobi to "Ratio Tile", and the Jedi to "Hopeless Situation Warriors". Additionally, the resulting subtitles introduce random profanity and instances of Chinglish. A full-length English fandub of the film was produced for YouTube.

The bootleg is most famous for its translation of Darth Vader's climactic scream of "Nooooooo!", which was rendered in the subtitles as "Do not want". Following the fandub's wider circulation in early 2017, the bootleg received renewed attention from entertainment journalists, several of whom praised the quality of the voice acting and its unintentional comedic reworking of the film.

== History ==
=== Origin ===
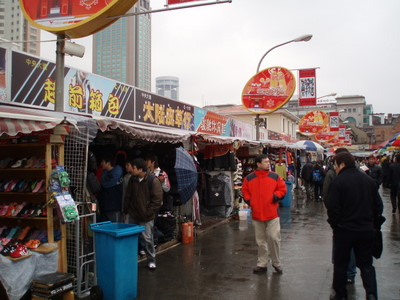
Xiangyang Market, pictured in 2006, and shut down that year

On June 7, 2005, Jeremy Winterson wrote about his experience seeing Star Wars: Episode III – Revenge of the Sith at a local theater with a friend who was visiting for business the past weekend. Winterson considered the film as superior to the first two films in the Star Wars prequel trilogy and a fitting conclusion to the saga, while noting it was in the middle position in the chronology of the series.

The following day, Winterson encountered a DVD seller and decided to purchase a bootleg DVD of Revenge of the Sith as part of a batch from a local street vendor along his commute. He wrote that the seller had assured him of the DVD's quality, which was priced at 7 RMB. (Note: 7 RMB was roughly equivalent to US$0.85 in June 2005.)

At the time, Winterson lived in Shanghai, China, as an expat for work in 2005. Having shelved the DVD shortly after purchase, he later credited his sister with rediscovering it and sparking his interest. Winterson stated he purchased the DVD at Xiangyang Market, an open-air market in Shanghai known as a major hub for pirated and counterfeit goods. The following year, in 2006, the market was permanently closed as part of a crackdown to improve the city's image.

Following positive feedback from friends and family on Winterson's blog post about the bootleg, one of his friends shared it through a work mailing list, after which it became popular enough that Winterson's domain provider temporarily suspended his blog for exceeding its bandwidth limits. Winterson's blog post was briefly mentioned in an official starwars.com blog post on June 17, 2005.

=== Translation errors ===
In a poorly machine-translated exchange, Anakin Skywalker (left) informs Obi-Wan Kenobi (right) that he was "made by the Presbyterian Church" (mistranslation of the Jedi Council).

Winterson theorized the film's subtitles were first transcribed by hand into Chinese and then machine-translated back into English. The machine translation often ignored structural differences between English and Chinese and produced literal translations of Chinese characters.

Notable character and faction name changes include:

- Anakin Skywalker was translated to "Allah Gold".
- Obi-Wan Kenobi was translated to "Ratio Tile".
- Chancellor Palpatine was translated to "Speaker D".
- The Jedi were translated to "Hopeless Situation Warriors".
- The Jedi Council was translated to the "Presbyterian Church" or "Hopeless Situation Presbyterians".

== Reception and legacy ==
A full-length fandub of the film was produced by the YouTube channel TheThirdGathers; the dub was later reposted, in full, by YouTube channel GratefulDeadpool on February 14, 2016. (Note: Gizmodo states the following: "Clarification: The video was reportedly first made in 2006, but was most recently put on YouTube in 2016." The reason and source for the dating are unattributed.) The English fandub received wider attention from entertainment journalists in January 2017, with some viewing it as an unintentional and comedic improvement over the original film. The Hollywood Reporter called the redub a "fan-made masterpiece" that did "the unthinkable" by making the film "cool", while Uproxx declared it a "vastly superior movie". The A.V. Club described the "legendarily bad Chinese dub" as the "best version of the Star Wars prequels," writing that it made the film "watchable by making [it] even less sensible".

The machine translation inadvertently introduces "fuck" and other profane words into the subtitles.

SlashFilm described the machine-translated script as a "beautiful monstrosity" and "kind of magical", declaring it "the only version of this movie I ever want to watch". Noting its unintentional comedy and the mixed reception of the prequel trilogy films, Nerdist stated it allowed fans to enjoy the film as a "bizarre, sometimes incoherent comedy," and Gizmodo declared it "gloriousness defined" and "basically the greatest thing on Earth." Several journalists further noted the quality of the fandub cast's voice acting.

Journalists highlighted specific bizarre mistranslations, such as General Grievous commanding troops to "batter to death them", and random use of the word "fuck" and other profanity, which Inverse stated made the otherwise "squeaky-clean" film "weird and enjoyable". The bootleg is best known for the mistranslation of Darth Vader's climactic scream of "Nooooooo!", into "Do not want", upon learning about the death of his wife, Padmé Amidala. Inverse attributed this to the lack of "an equivalent word for 'no'" in Chinese, with the machine translation instead using the "negative tense of a verb" based on the scene's context.

== See also ==
- Engrish
- Humour in translation
- Dünyayı Kurtaran Adam
- English as She Is Spoke
