= Striking and Picturesque Delineations of the Grand, Beautiful, Wonderful, and Interesting Scenery Around Loch-Earn =

1815 short book by Angus McDiarmid

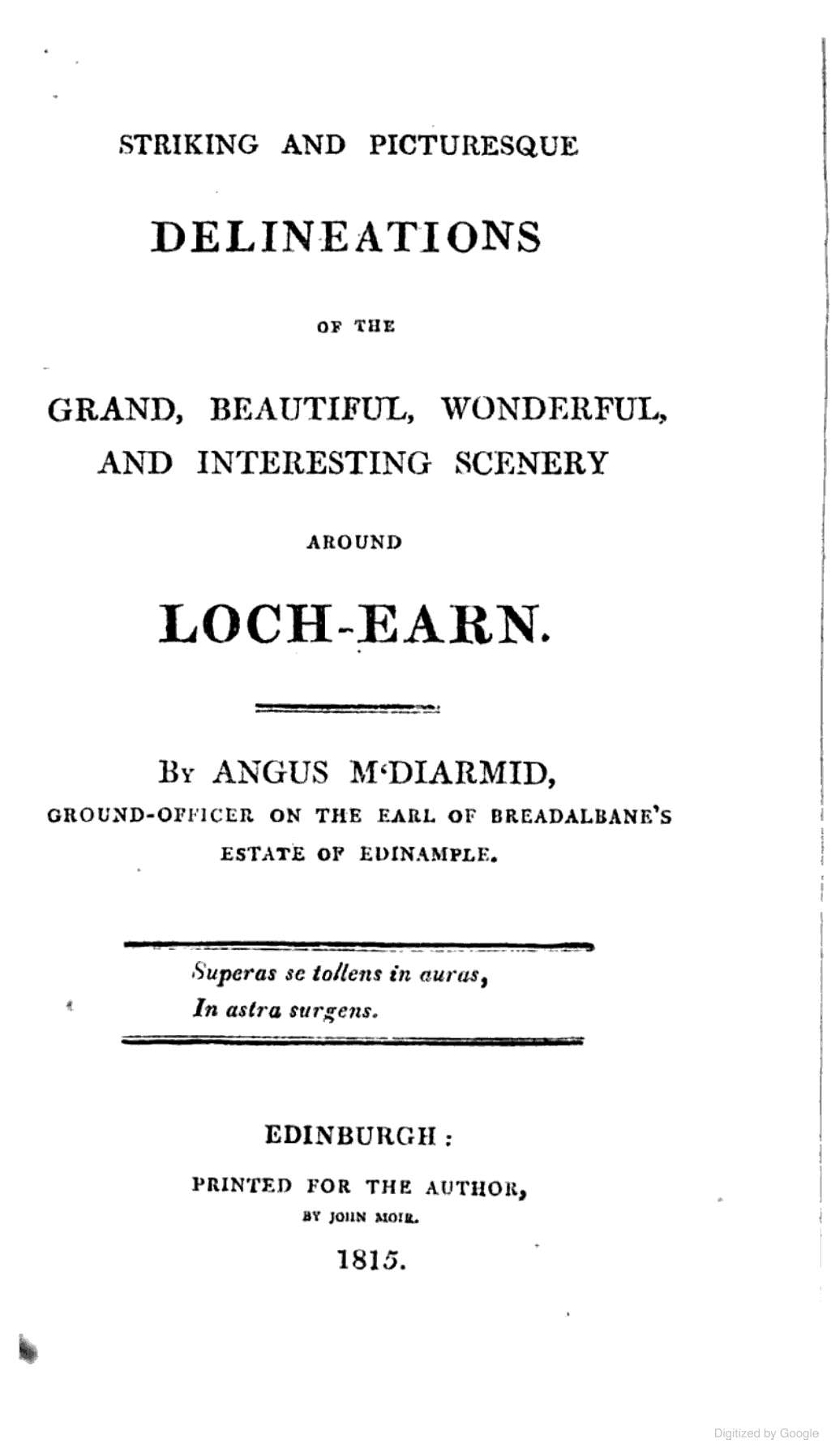
- Author: Angus McDiarmid
- Language: English
- Subject: Southern Scottish Highlands
- Genre: Description and travel
- Publisher: John Moir
- Publication date: 1815
- Publication place: Scotland
- Media type: Print (hardcover)
- Pages: 28 (main text)
- OCLC: 29627181

Striking and Picturesque Delineations of the Grand, Beautiful, Wonderful, and Interesting Scenery Around Loch-Earn, also published as A Description of the Beauties of Edinample and Lochearnhead, is a short book by the Scottish writer Angus McDiarmid (fl. early 19th century) that led the local history populariser Archie McKerracher to call him "the world's worst author".

The book is poorly written and has been humorously criticized by readers. The main text describes the scenery near Lochearnhead, including landmarks and local history. McDiarmid's writing style is characterized by obscure and misused words, leading to its classification as a literary curiosity. The book gained some attention for the phrase "incoherent transactions" referring to thievery and has been referenced by other authors. McDiarmid's background and existence are unclear, leading to speculation about his existence. The book was first published in 1815, with subsequent editions released in 1816, 1841, 1875 (including a Gaelic edition), and 1876.

== Synopsis ==
The book begins with a dedication to the Earl of Breadalbane (presumably John Campbell, the fourth Earl, as the book was first published in 1815). Its "grovelling and abject" tone was already by that time considered unusual. An anonymous preface then recounts how an unnamed "Gentleman", on a grouse-shooting visit to the earl's estate in the Lochearnhead region, met Angus McDiarmid, a ground officer (or gillie, a gamekeeper and guide for field sports) employed by the earl. Struck by McDiarmid's eloquent descriptions of the scenery and associated legends, the gentleman learned that McDiarmid had written a manuscript, which McDiarmid entrusted to him to be published. The preface praises the "unparalleled sublimity" of the book's style, which it connects with the rugged Highland landscape and offers as the reason that McDiarmid's sentences "overleap the mounds and impediments of grammar".

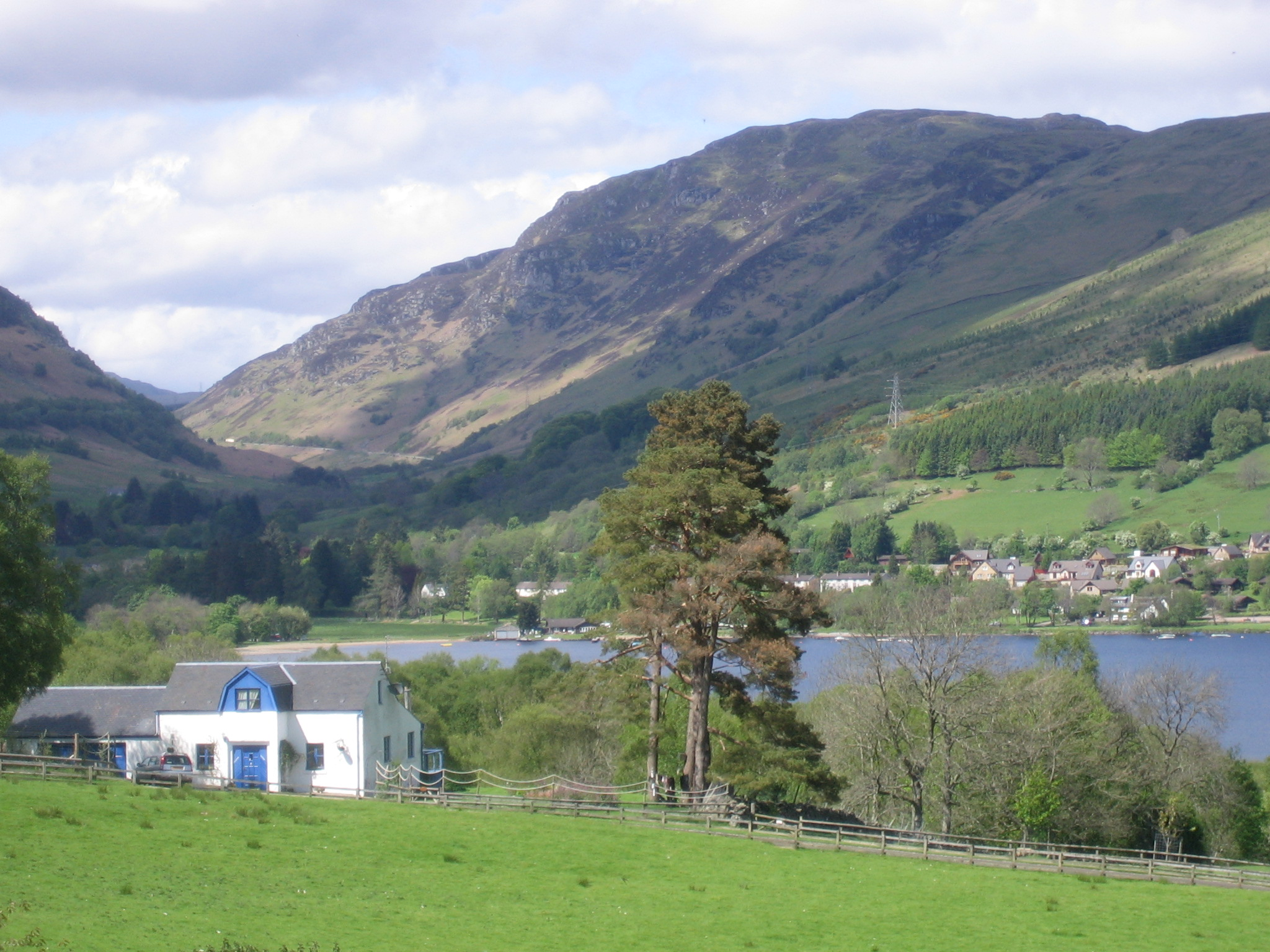
Lochearnhead and Glen Ogle (the valley at left) in May 2007.

The main text is 28 pages about the region near Lochearnhead. There are three sections:

- "Sketch of the Scenery at Loch-Earn" is described by its title. Features mentioned include Edinample Castle, Glen Ogle, and Loch Earn.
- "Sketch of the Following Descriptions" covers scenery including the nearby mountains of Ben Vorlich and Stùc a' Chroin, wild and domestic animals, and local history and legend.
- "Sketch of an Ancient History Deserves to Be Inserted" adds fairly recent local history and animal stories.

McDiarmid's dedication is in grammatical English, but the main text is not, and is full of obscure and misused words. The paragraph about an earthquake in the Grampian Mountains is emblematic of McDiarmid's style.

It merits the trouble to exhibit a description of a part of Glenogle's Grampian mountains, disjointed in the time of the generations past ; which event happen about the twilight, that the dread of the horrible sight seized the beholders with fear, ultera the comprehension of the individual, discernible to their sight. The pillars of fire rising from the parting of the rock, where there was a cement, the stones forcibly dashing one against another, that the melancholy sight was similar to a corner of mountain set wholly on fire, also overhearing such a loud noise of the stones break at juncture ; which vociferous might reach the ears of the people living at great distant. This place perceptible to view of the beholders that passes by.

== Reaction ==
As early as its own preface, the book has been classified as a "literary curiosity". As the publisher intended, it seems to have succeeded as unintentional humour. One "J. Ss.", answering a question in Notes and Queries, describes buying a copy of the book from McDiarmid two or three years after its publication and having McDiarmid read it to him and his companions, amusing not only J. Ss. but also McDiarmid's fellow gillies. A later bookseller called it "a most amusing specimen of Gaelic-English." In an unusually favourable opinion, "R. S. A.", another commentator in Notes and Queries, refers to McDiarmid's "rough eloquence", and despite "[w]hatever may be thought of M'Diarmid's style as a writer of English", praises his perception of natural beauty and his "generous ardour" in narrating feats of heroism. J. Ss. said that McDiarmid's native language was Scottish Gaelic and that the latter used a dictionary extensively in translating his writings into English, choosing the most impressive words without regard to their parts of speech. McKerracher says that McDiarmid's minister read in church some Gaelic translations from Samuel Johnson, and McDiarmid tried to emulate or surpass Johnson's orotund expression.

Probably the best-known phrase in the book is "incoherent transactions", apparently referring to theft, which occurs three times. Robert Southey used it twice (with credit to McDiarmid) in his Life of Cowper to describe William Hayley's eccentricities and used it in at least three letters. Dr. John Brown cited it as well and took it to apply to Rob Roy MacGregor (possibly identifying a robber McDiarmid described as "a barbarous man ... who was notoriously for savageness of manner" as MacGregor). A more recent mention of the phrase occurs in Vladimir Nabokov's novel Pale Fire; the narrator sees McDiarmid's prose as a precursor to Finnegans Wake, a comparison Nabokov also made in a draft note.

A folklorist quoted McDiarmid's story of a kelpie and called the book "one of the most astonishing books ever written in 'English'".

== The author ==
Little is known about Angus McDiarmid, and his existence is disputed. "R. S. A." says that he was introduced to McDiarmid in 1815, "a fine athletic young man" who was enthusiastic but modest. McKerracher suggests a birth year around 1770, which does not agree well with R. S. A.'s description of McDiarmid as "young" in 1815. "J. Ss." mentions meeting McDiarmid a few years later and describes him as dressing more poorly than the other gillies, in a black coat and a hat instead of "in the highland fashion" (presumably the Scottish kilt and associated clothing) like the others.

The preface assures the reader that visitors to Lochearnhead could confirm McDiarmid's existence and his sole authorship of the book. However, an antiquarian notes that although most accept the book as authentic, doubt whether McDiarmid existed is possible. If he did not, "J. Ss." and "R. S. A." would have been either been originators of the hoax or joined in it.

== Publication history ==
"J. Ss." recalled that the man who first had the manuscript published was a Colonel O'Reilly, and that O'Reilly gave the print run to McDiarmid to sell for his own benefit.

- McDiarmid, Angus, ground-officer on the Earl of Breadalbane's estate of Edinample (1815). Striking and Picturesque Delineations of the Grand, Beautiful, Wonderful, and Interesting Scenery Around Loch-Earn. Edinburgh: John Moir. Bound in morocco, with the top edge gilt.
- 1816. Second edition, with "Important additions". Edinburgh: John Moir.
- 1841. As A Description of the Beauties of Edinample and Lochearnhead. Aberfeldy: D. Cameron. Bound in half-calf, with the top edge gilt.
- MacDiarmid, Angus (1875). Cunntas ar Boidhecheadan Ceann-Lochearn agus Edinapolis le Aonghas Mac Dhiarmid. An treas clo-bhualadh le mineachadh agus Soilleireachd. Or a Description of the Beauties of Edinample and Lochearnhead. Third Edition, with Notes and Illustrations. Edited by Fear Gall. Edinburgh. Includes eight plates. Only the title is in Gaelic.
- McDiarmid, Angus (1876). A Description of the Beauties of Edinample and Lochearnhead. Aberfeldy: D. Cameron. Retrieved 30 September 2008.

In 1888, an uncut first edition sold at auction for £5 10 shillings, equivalent to £439 in 2007 currency by the retail-price index.

== See also ==
- Purple prose, overly ornate prose text that disrupts a narrative flow by drawing undesirable attention to its own extravagant style of writing
- English as She Is Spoke, a 19th-century English–Portuguese dictionary whose wild inaccuracy made it another example of unintentional humour.
- The Eye of Argon, a 1970 fantasy novella of similar reputation.
- Bulwer-Lytton Fiction Contest for worst opening line of a novel; inspired by the "purple prose" of a 19th-century English writer and politician
