= Humour in translation =

Translation mistakes amusing to native speakers

Humour in translation can be caused by translation errors, because of irregularities and discrepancies between certain items that translators attempt to translate. This could be due to the ignorance of the translator, as well as the untranslatability of the text as a result of linguistic or cultural differences. In addition, translation errors can be caused by the language incompetence of the translator in the target language, resulting in unintended ambiguity in the message conveyed. Translation errors can distort the intended meaning of the author or speaker, to the point of absurdity and ludicrousness, giving a humorous and comedic effect.

Translation errors can cause accidental humour, which is similar in effect to intentional humour. Like intentional humour, accidental humour is also a combination of linguistics and culture-specific features, with humour generating devices (like words and phrases) embedded in it, and is just as competent in conveying humour.

Most translation errors are due to the untranslatability of the language and the failure of linguistic domestication and foreignisation processes. For instance, idiomatic expressions of Chinese like 多多少少 ( [ˈduɔ duɔ ʃaʊ ʃaʊˈ] ) means ‘to an extent’ in English. However, if literally translated, the same phrase can mean ‘many many few few’, losing its original meaning and creating a ludicrous expression of meaning.

A case of untranslatability was evident when Coca-Cola first entered the Chinese market in 1928. Initially, Chinese transliterations of "Coca-Cola" used Chinese characters that, when they were combined as a written phrase, resulted in ridiculous readings such as "female horse fastened with wax", or "bite the wax tadpole". There was hence a need to find four Chinese characters with pronunciations that approximated the sound of "Coca-Cola", without producing a nonsensical or adverse meaning. This brand blunder was eventually solved with the characters 可口可乐, which could be translated as "to allow the mouth to be able to rejoice".

Hence the combination and translation of words expressed must conform to the target culture and literal language interpretation or it would result in hilarious misunderstandings. Prime examples of such errors come in the form of poorly translated sign posts, notices and menus that fail to cater the intended meaning to both foreign and local speakers. A famous early example was the nineteenth century Portuguese-English phrase book, English as She Is Spoke.

== Translation difficulties ==
Colloquial expressions and conventions in the source language can cause humour or result in a strange interpretation from the listener or reader in instances when they are not translated into equivalent expressions or conventions in the target language, and instead are translated mechanically or word-for-word.

Difficulties with translation can arise from differences in word order, or from culture-bound expressions, and often also because of the inflexibility of machine translation. Also, it is due partly to the existence of multiple cultural, linguistic and semantic factors which requires machine translation to be supplemented by a human translator to convey the intended message of the source text.

Translation difficulties can therefore cause translation errors, which can result in humour. A more specific elaboration of various causes of translation errors is discussed below.

== Translation error types and resultant humour ==
Below are some components of linguistic stimulus theories that attempts to explain the way humour might be derived from translations, as adapted from "Accidental Humor in International Public Notices Displayed in English" by M. Farghal in 2006.

External factors like cultural awareness, time considerations, social class and educational considerations, along with internal factors like situation and narrative strategy also play a big part in the effect of translation on humour.

=== Ambiguity ===
Words that are homonymic, paronymic, alliterative or rhyming, or metalinguistic devices of language can be used to produce humour. Also, wordplay which includes the use of puns, one liners, limericks, witticisms, among various others, can be another way to produce humour.

For example, these are some humorous translations done by machine translators:

- In the office of a doctor in Rome: Specialist in women and other diseases.
- In a Japanese hotel: You are invited to take advantage of the chambermaid.
- In a Norwegian cocktail lounge: Ladies are requested not to have children in the bar.

=== Semantic overlap ===
Humour can result from the interlocutor's inability to understand homonyms, homographs or semantically related synonym words. Similarly, words with superordinate and subordinate relationships are confused.

Overlapping semantics are difficult to distinguish, especially in translation. Words with multiple meanings (polysemous words) are mostly untranslatable, especially if they contain many connotations. Confusion of sense relations can also result because of semantic overlap. Confusion of sense relations in the set includes the improper use of superonym for hyponym, hyponym for superonym, a whole word for a partial word, a partial word for a whole word, antonym, confusion of co-hyponyms, and misuse of near-synonyms.

An example of semantic overlap found in a golf course:

ANY PERSONS (EXCEPT PLAYERS) CAUGHT COLLECTING GOLF BALLS ON THIS COURSE WILL BE PROSECUTED AND HAVE THEIR BALLS REMOVED

The interlocutor's erroneous choice of word removed instead of confiscated results in accidental humour in the context as shown in the example above. Semantically, removed is a commonly used word to express the action ‘take away’ and both are related in terms of sense. Removed thus may be used as a superordinate form that includes the action of taking away. The humorous aspect of this situation is intensified by the strong use of word removed in the phrase have their balls removed, which suggests an orchidectomy (removal of the testicles) instead of the much less extreme action of confiscation. With the overlapping of semantics, the intended message is thus misinterpreted and accidental humour results.

Lexico-semantic clusterings can result in paradigmatic errors. It reflects the relations between related words and expressions, which is mainly of paradigmatic relations. The humour above is triggered by the translated text consisting of a script-switch trigger, which then results in the double reading. The irony is not lost in the contexts provided.

=== Lexical gaps (Pragmatics) ===
Lexical gaps concerns words or phrases having no direct translation in any given language (Untranslatability). Humor, then, results from the interlocutor's inability to grasp the lexical gaps in the target language and linguistic representations may either be over generalised or under-generalised to the point of absurdity.

From a Czech tourist agency:

Take one of our horse-driven city tours. We guarantee no miscarriages.

The humour comes from the translator filling in an English lexical gap based on the lexical noun, "miss" by adding a prefix mis-. English employs the two verbs miss the carriage and miscarriages to mean vastly different actions. There is a lexical gap in English because the action of missing a carriage cannot be expressed with the same import and the same economy of verbalisation. The misuse of this lexical gap and overgeneralisation conflates the ludicrous idea of the horse-driven tours with no miscarriages.

In an advertisement for a Hong Kong dentist:

Teeth are extracted by the latest Methodists.

From this example, the interlocutor did not understand English derivations of ‘doer’ nouns such as specialist, or suppletion such as experts and mistakenly uses the derivational pattern to coin a lexeme from method. Accidental humour ensues as a result of the same word coinciding with the unlikely homophone Methodist, which refers to the Christian religious denomination, creating a ridiculous situation in the context of dentistry.

An American slogan for Salem cigarettes was, "Salem - Feeling Free". When translated for marketing in the Japanese market, it means, "When smoking Salem, you feel so refreshed that your mind seems to be free and empty". This is an example of the translator trying to fill in the connotations of the lexical unit "free", perhaps because of limited vocabulary competency; this thus resulted in an intralingual error. In this case there are actually Japanese terms equivalent to the adjective, "free" (e.g., 自由な).

All being said, languages do have a productivity and recursion property that can also allow words and phrases to combine creatively to fill in the lexical gaps.

The following Telugu idiom refers to situations whereby people spend extravagantly, beyond their means:

Minga methuku ledu kaani meesalaki sampenga nooni anta

Translation:

(He has) no food to eat, but has perfumed oil for his moustache

And this to a situation of idleness, boredom, or conducting frivolous tasks to fill up time

Thochi thoyyanamma thotikodalu putti intiki vellinattu

Translation:

The lady with nothing to do goes to visit her husband's brother's wife's parents' house.

These Telugu expressions above can seem nearly impossible to translate. But with the usage of English to translate and establish the context, the meanings of the expression can be derived to be understandable.

=== Morpho-phonological similarity ===
In some cases, incidental humour is produced when interlocutors erroneously use lexemes based on vague morpho-phonological similarity to the target word.

Japan's second-largest tourist agency was bewildered when it initially entered English markets and began receiving overwhelming requests for sexual tours. When they finally understood the problem with their name, Kinki Nippon Tourist Company decided to change it.

An interesting and amusing example would be the pronunciation of English words with Chinese translatability by actor Xiao Xiao Bin in the 2010 comedy-martial arts film Just Call Me Nobody:

- [Yes] → 爷死 /ji̯ɛ sɨ/ ‘Grandpa dies’
- [Nice] → 奶死 /naɪ̯ sɨ/ ‘Grandma dies’
- [Bus] → 爸死 /bɑ sɨ/ ‘Dad dies’
- [Knees] → 你死 /ni sɨ/ ‘You die’
- [Was] → 我死 /wu̯ɔ sɨ/‘I die’
- [Does] → 都死 /tɤʊ̯ sɨ/ ‘All die’
- [One dollar] → 完蛋了 /wu̯an tan lɯ̯ʌ/ ‘It’s over’

These examples illustrate the complete loss of the original meaning of the English words. Though the Chinese-to-English words sound almost phonetically correct, the pronunciation is easily translatable to a Chinese lexeme of a depressing meaning (e.g. : ‘All die’). With the juxtaposition of the intended and accidental meaning with the cheerful pragmatics of the film, the translation becomes a hilariously erroneous one.

=== Misspelling ===
Misspelled words can be portrayed as the most basic level of inducing unintentional humour that occurs in all translations, especially in signs or restaurants' menus. The ability to create humour out of misspelled words in translations happens in particular when the lexical items in a phrase or sentence are well-known and common to English speakers but in a particular context; the lexical items appears to possess a totally different meaning that could be inappropriate at times.

=== Dialectal differences ===
Language varieties include regional, social, and temporal dialects. For example, there are noticeable dialectal differences in the Chinese language used in China, Taiwan, Hong Kong, and other parts of Asia. The Spanish usage in Spain, Latin America, the Caribbean, Africa, and the US have many variants as well. Unintended humour can happen when the translation criterion is merely a linguistic one without taking into account the users of the translation, e.g. the English word unit (apartment) mean very different things in Chinese regional dialects.

=== References ===
Using the wrong reference may change the translator's intended meaning and lead to multiple comical interpretations for the readers, thus producing various humorous scripts. For example, a sign in a Chinese Safari Park states:

大象在此 请留在车上 Elephants Here Please Stay In Your Car

The translator intended to refer the general public that are visiting the park as the implicit reference marker of the sign by using the co-referential anaphor 'your', but failed to do so and instead, the explicit anaphor 'Your' unintentionally picks up 'elephants' as the textual referent. Thus, this give rise to a humorous script that looks as though that the sign is meant for the elephants and not the people. This example also highlights the importance of having punctuation to serve as a cohesion device because if the translator were to put a full stop or exclamation point after the word 'Elephants Here', the anaphor 'your' would have been interpreted literally by readers. It would have also eliminated a humorous reading.

An article in Soviet Weekly reports

There will be a Moscow Exhibition of Arts by 15,000 Soviet Republic painters and sculptors. These were executed over the past two years.

Similarly, there is a mishap of the anaphoric reference marker 'these', which to the interpretation of readers, refers to 'Soviet Republic painters and sculptors'. Thus, it conveys the idea that thousands of painters and sculptors were executed over the past two years. In terms of the translator's intentions, the reference marker 'these' actually refers textually to the referent 'Arts' or, perhaps, 'the painters and sculptors' works' and not the 'Soviet Republic painters and sculptors' themselves. Hence, this script lacks an eligible textual referent to accurately bring across the intended message. Although this script is easily decipherable based upon one's basic knowledge, it still causes laughter.

=== Word order ===
Word order is the way in which syntactic constituents of a language arrange itself in a phrase or a sentence. Different languages employ different structures of word order. Direct translation of one language to another may result in wrong placement of a phrase in relation to the other constituents in the sentence. This may cause a change to the initial meaning of the translator and hence, may trigger a humorous script.

A sign in the lobby of a Moscow hotel across a Russian Orthodox monastery states

Вы можете посетить кладбище, где известные российские и советские композиторы, художники и писатели похоронены ежедневно, кроме четверга. You are welcome to visit the cemetery where famous Russian and Soviet composers, artists and writers are buried daily except Thursday.

Because of the incorrect placement of the adverbial phrase ‘daily except Thursday’ at the end of the sentence, this script generates unintentional humour in its translation. The adverbial phrase ‘daily except Thursday’ becomes a post-modifier which misguides the reader into thinking that the script is about the act of burying ‘famous Russian and Soviet composers, artists and writers’, instead of conveying the act of visiting the cemetery. Apparently, the translator wanted to avoid a possible awkwardness of phrasing the post-modifier after the appropriate act, but was unaware that the parentheses applied would also enclose another awkward and comical adverbial at the same time.

A menu in a Tokyo bar shows:

Special cocktails for the ladies with nuts.

Likewise, the humour in this case is also caused by the wrong placement of the prepositional phrase ‘with nuts’ as a post-modifier of ‘the ladies’ instead of its intended referent ‘cocktails’ as a post-modifier. Although the mishap is triggered by the mistaken word order, which can be changed to "Special cocktails with nuts for the ladies", it would still have remained as an awkward sentence because of the polysemous word ‘nuts’. Thus, if the word ‘nuts’ were to be replaced with ‘cashews’, a humorous translation error could have been avoided. Therefore, attachment sites of prepositional phrases are a notorious source of ambiguity in English.

=== False friends ===
False friends are terms from one language which are identical or very similar in form to a word in another, but differ in their meaning. As translators are repeatedly switching from one language to the other, they may occasionally use a false friend by accident, instead of an appropriate translation of the term they are seeking to render into the other language.

In other cases, they may choose to work with false friends in order to achieve specific effects. One notable example occurs in the German-language dubbing of "Remember Me", an episode of Star Trek: The Next Generation. In the English original, the character of Beverly Crusher remarks the following about a nebulous image on the Enterprise's viewscreen:

Computer, what is that mist I'm seeing?

In the German dub, this is rendered as:

Computer, was ist das für ein Mist, den ich da sehe?

Translated back into English, this means approximately: "Computer, what kind of rubbish am I seeing there?". This arises because the German word Mist has the figurative meaning of "rubbish" (and a literal meaning of "dung" or "crap"). The default German translation of the English noun "mist" would have been "Nebel". However, the German word Mist not only matches the lip movement, but also transports the frustration of the character even more clearly than the original expression.

== See also ==
- Humour
- Translation
- Machine translation
- Engrish, mistakes in the English produced by Japanese speakers can be humorous to native speakers.
- English as she is spoke, a phrase book full of mistakes.
- "Prawo Jazdy", an alleged criminal in Ireland whose name comes from the Polish phrase for "driver's licence" (as erroneously entered by the Irish police onto their records).
- Backstroke of the West, a badly translated Chinese bootleg dub of Star Wars Episode III: Revenge of the Sith
