= IAPM Mall =

- 环贸iapm商场
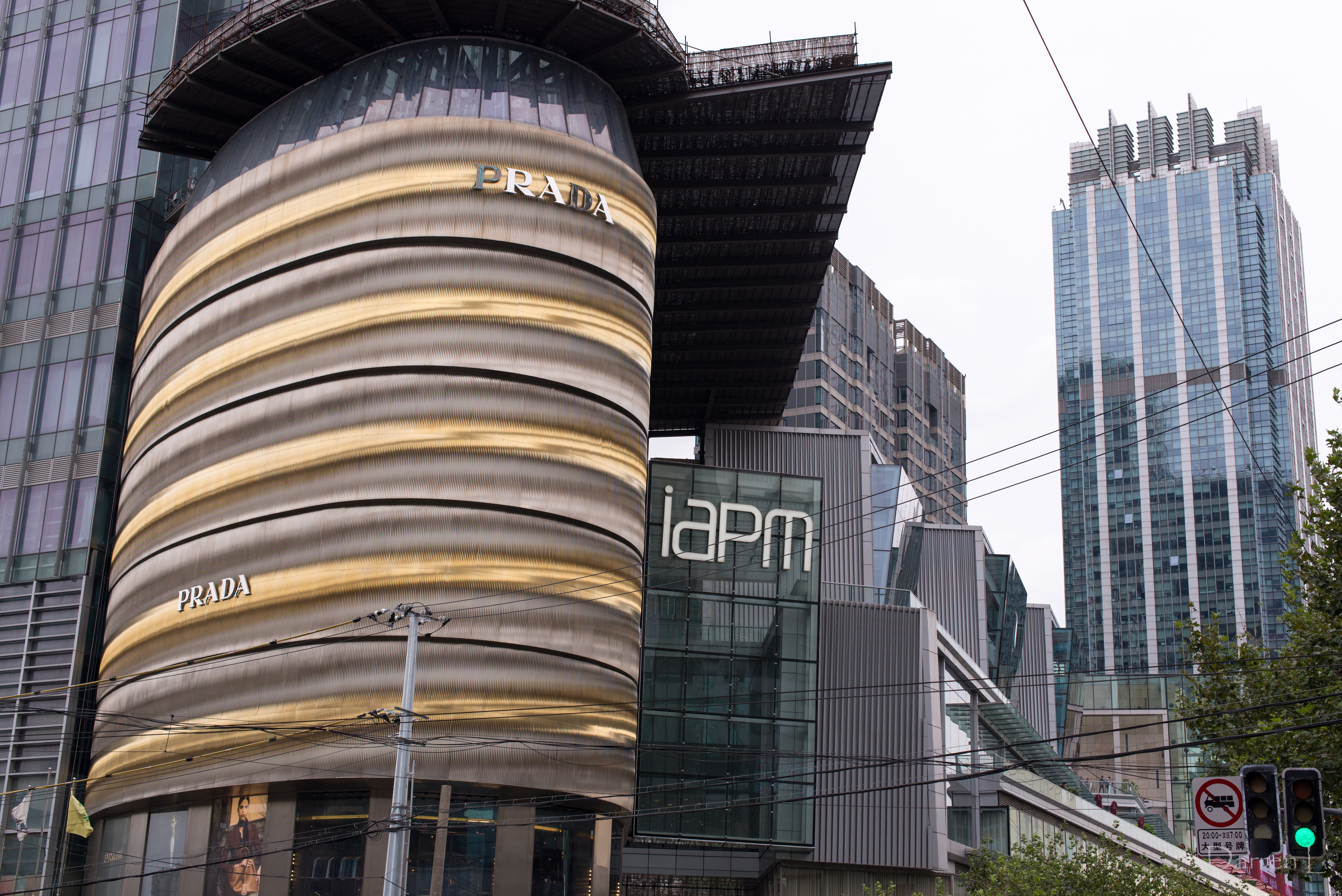
- Exterior Facade in 2014
- Location: Shanghai
- Coordinates: 31.2174°N 121.4537°E
- Address: 999 Huaihai Road
- Floors: 4
- Public transit: Shanghai Metro Line 1, 10, and 12

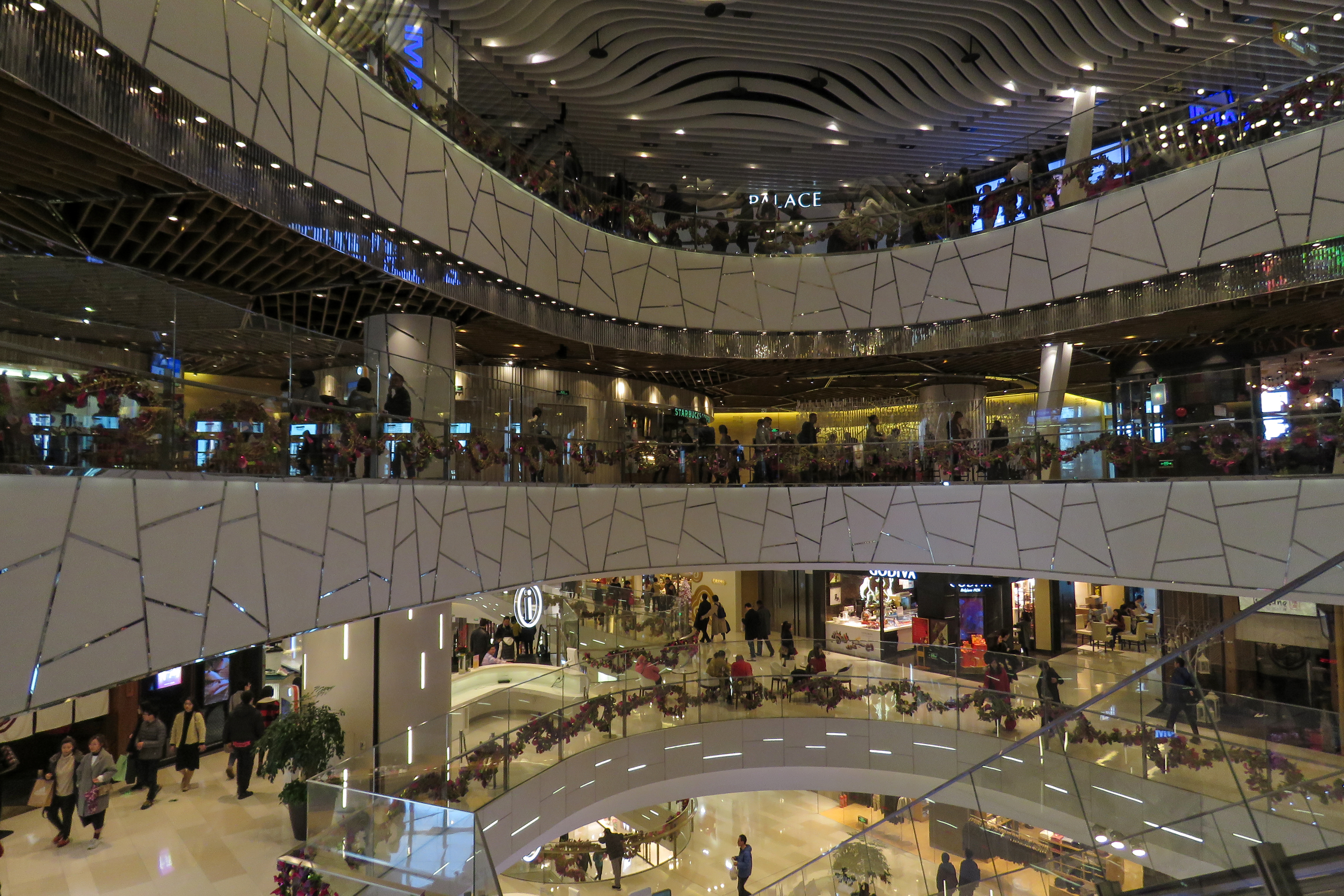
Interior of the mall, 2018

IAPM Mall, or iAPM Mall, (Chinese: 环贸iapm商场) is a shopping mall located at 999 Huaihai Road in Xuhui District, Shanghai, China.

This upscale mall houses big-name boutiques on the first two floors, including Prada, Gucci, Miu Miu and Dolce & Gabbana, Stella McCartney, Alexander McQueen, Alexander Wang, Chloé, Maje, Balmain and Michael Kors.

Younger brands like Zadig & Voltaire, Marimekko, Fedon and Muji occupy the third floor and the fourth floor is for sports brands like Nike, Aigle, and Onitsuka Tiger.

The mall is complete with restaurants, cafes and cinemas.

== History ==
The mall opened in 2013. It was built on the site of the former Xiangyang Market.

== Transportation ==
The mall is connected by Shanghai Metro Line 1, 10, and 12 (South Shaanxi Road Station).

== See also ==
- List of shopping malls in China
