= Fandub =

Fans audio recording a translation for media that has none

A fandub is a fan-made dub or redub of a live-action or animated production. Dubbing is the act of re-recording of a live-action or animated production, typically in a language other than the original. Most productions are translated from different languages, but some fandubs are for productions originally in the fandubber's native language. The dialogue can range from being a close translation to a completely-altered version of the original script's story and plots, as well as the personalities of protagonists.

The reasons behind fandubbing can range from the production not receiving an official dub to the official dub being poorly received. Fandubs are most commonly done with Japanese animation, but sometimes include live-action and animated series and movies in any language. Versions where the story line, character personalities, and content are dramatically altered, typically for humor, are called "Abridged Series" and "fundubs".

Fandubbing can also refer to a translated cover of a song in another language, frequently anime theme songs. Several English-language voice actors, such as Amanda Lee and Cristina Vee, have published fandub covers on YouTube.

== History ==
Amateur voice acting began simultaneously and independently from each other in a small number of developed countries. One of the first recorded projects, dating from 1989, was the anime fan-dub parody "Laputa II: The Sequel", an English redub of the first four episodes of Nadia: The Secret of Blue Water.

A Star Wars fandub of Dominik Kuhn (Dodokay), using a scene in the film for a viral marketing parody, gained fame with German mainstream media. Another Star Wars fandub of Revenge of the Sith, using mistranslated subtitles from a bootleg Chinese version, became popular on YouTube as Star War The Third Gathers: Backstroke of the West.

While fansubbing is a highly-popular means by which various Internet-downloaded visual media can be understood by other language markets, fandubbing as a practice has not gained similar momentum as a means of translation by lay Internet users. The majority of fandub projects are arranged for short-form video clips and are often posted to video hosting services such as YouTube.

Most series are produced online with voice actors often auditioning via forums, but live dubbing sessions at anime cons often take place, for example the "Anime Dub Live" panels held in the UK.

== Legality ==
Due to typically using copyrighted material, fandubs face the same copyright implications as fansubs, such as receiving copyright strike. To avoid such issues, fandubs are sometimes made using web-based dubbing tools like Dubroo, which does not alter the original videos but just plays the dubbed audio along with the original muted video.

Another risk for voice actor working on legitimate dub is getting involved with fandub may get them fired from their roles.

== See also ==
- Abridged series
- Dubbing
- Dub localization
- Fansub
- Fan translation
- Friendship Is Witchcraft
- Machinima
- Neo-Benshi
