= Pale Fire =

1962 novel by Vladimir Nabokov

- First US edition of Pale Fire
- Author: Vladimir Nabokov
- Language: English
- Genre: Metafiction
- Publisher: G. P. Putnam's Sons
- Publication date: 1962 (corrected edition first published by Vintage International, 1989)
- Publication place: United States
- Pages: 315
- OCLC: 289702

Pale Fire is a 1962 novel by Vladimir Nabokov. The novel is presented as a 999-line poem titled "Pale Fire", written by the fictional poet John Shade, with a foreword, lengthy commentary, and index written by Shade's neighbor and academic colleague, Charles Kinbote. Together these elements form a narrative in which both fictional authors are central characters. Nabokov wrote Pale Fire in 1960–61, after the success of Lolita had made him financially independent, allowing him to retire from teaching and return to Europe. Nabokov began writing the novel in Nice and completed it in Montreux, Switzerland.

While Lolita remains his most famous work, many critics and scholars cite Pale Fire as Vladimir Nabokov's magnum opus. The Nabokov authority Brian Boyd has called it "Nabokov's most perfect novel", and the critic Harold Bloom called it "the surest demonstration of his own genius ... that remarkable tour de force". The novel's unusual structure has attracted much attention, and it is often cited as an important example of metafiction, as well as an analog precursor to hypertext fiction, and a poioumenon. It has spawned a wide variety of interpretations and a large body of written criticism, which literary scholar Pekka Tammi estimated in 1995 as more than 80 studies.

== Novel structure ==
Starting with the epigraph and table of contents, Pale Fire is apparently the publication of a 999-line poem in four cantos ("Pale Fire") by the fictional John Shade with a foreword, extensive commentary, and index by his self-appointed editor, Charles Kinbote. Kinbote's commentary takes the form of notes to various numbered lines of the poem. Here, as in the rest of his critical apparatus, Kinbote explicates the poem very little. Focusing monomaniacally on his own concerns, he divulges what proves to be the plot piece by piece, some of which can be connected by following the many cross-references. Espen Aarseth noted that Pale Fire "can be read either unicursally, straight through, or multicursally, jumping between the comments and the poem." Thus, although the narration is non-linear and multidimensional, the reader can still choose to read the novel in a linear manner without risking misinterpretation.

The interaction between Kinbote and Shade takes place in the fictitious small college town and state of New Wye, Appalachia, where they live across a lane from each other from February to July 1959. Kinbote writes his commentary from then to October 1959 in a tourist cabin in the equally fictitious western town and state of Cedarn, Utana. Both authors recount many earlier events, Shade mostly in New Wye and Kinbote in New Wye and in Europe, especially the "distant northern land" of Zembla.

== Plot summary ==
Shade's poem digressively describes many aspects of his life. Canto 1 includes his early encounters with death and glimpses of what he takes to be the supernatural. Canto 2 is about his family and the apparent suicide of his daughter, Hazel Shade. Canto 3 focuses on Shade's search for knowledge about an afterlife, culminating in a "faint hope" in higher powers "playing a game of worlds" as indicated by apparent coincidences. Canto 4 offers details on Shade's daily life and creative process, as well as thoughts on his poetry, which he finds to be a means of somehow understanding the universe.

In Kinbote's editorial contributions he tells three interwoven stories. One is his own story, notably including what he thinks of as his friendship with Shade. After Shade was murdered, Kinbote acquired the manuscript, including some variants, and has taken it upon himself to oversee the poem's publication, telling readers that it lacks only line 1000. Kinbote's second story deals with King Charles II, "The Beloved", the deposed king of Zembla. King Charles escaped imprisonment by Soviet-backed revolutionaries, making use of a secret passage and brave adherents in disguise. Kinbote repeatedly claims that he inspired Shade to write the poem by recounting King Charles's escape to him and that possible allusions to the king, and to Zembla, appear in Shade's poem, especially in rejected drafts. However, no explicit reference to King Charles is to be found in the poem. Kinbote's third story is that of Gradus, an assassin dispatched by the new rulers of Zembla to kill the exiled King Charles. Gradus makes his way from Zembla through Europe and America to New Wye, suffering comic mishaps. In the last note, to the missing line 1000, Kinbote narrates how Gradus killed Shade by mistake.

Towards the end of the narrative, Kinbote all but states that he is in fact the exiled King Charles, living incognito; however, enough details throughout the story, as well as direct statements of ambiguous sincerity by Kinbote towards the novel's end, suggest that King Charles and Zembla are both fictitious. In the latter interpretation, Kinbote is delusional and has built an elaborate picture of Zembla complete with samples of a constructed language as a by-product of insanity; similarly, Gradus was simply an unhinged man trying to kill Shade, and his backstory as a revolutionary assassin is also made up.

In an interview, Nabokov later said that Kinbote killed himself after finishing the book. The critic Michael Wood has stated, "This is authorial trespassing, and we don't have to pay attention to it", but Brian Boyd has argued that internal evidence points to Kinbote's suicide. One of Kinbote's annotations to Shade's poem (corresponding to line 493) addresses the subject of suicide at some length.

== Explanation of the title ==
As Nabokov pointed out himself, the title of John Shade's poem is from Shakespeare's Timon of Athens: "The moon's an arrant thief, / And her pale fire she snatches from the sun" (Act IV, scene 3), a line often taken as a metaphor about creativity and inspiration. Kinbote quotes the passage but does not recognize it, as he says he has access only to an inaccurate Zemblan translation of the play "in his Timonian cave", and in a separate note he even rails against the common practice of using quotations as titles.

Some critics have noted a secondary reference in the book's title to Hamlet, where the Ghost remarks how the glow-worm "gins to pale his uneffectual fire" (Act I, scene 5).

The title is first mentioned in the foreword: "I recall seeing him from my porch, on a brilliant morning, burning a whole stack of [index cards of drafts of the poem] in the pale fire of the incinerator...".

== Interpretations ==
Some readers concentrate on the apparent story, focusing on traditional aspects of fiction such as the relationship among the characters. In 1997, Brian Boyd published a much-discussed study arguing that the ghost of John Shade influenced Kinbote's contributions. He expanded this essay into a book in which he also argues that, in order to trigger Shade's poem, Hazel Shade's ghost induced Kinbote to recount his Zemblan delusions to Shade.

Some readers, starting with Mary McCarthy and including Boyd, Nabokov's annotator Alfred Appel, and D. Barton Johnson, see Charles Kinbote as an alter-ego of the insane Professor V. Botkin, to whose delusions John Shade and the rest of the faculty of Wordsmith College generally condescend. Nabokov himself endorsed this reading, stating in an interview in 1962 (the novel's year of publication) that Pale Fire "is full of plums that I keep hoping somebody will find. For instance, the nasty commentator is not an ex-King of Zembla nor is he professor Kinbote. He is professor Botkin, or Botkine, a Russian and a madman." The novel's intricate structure of teasing cross-references leads readers to this "plum". The Index, supposedly created by Kinbote, features an entry for a "Botkin, V.," describing this Botkin as an "American scholar of Russian descent"—and referring to a note in the Commentary on line 894 of Shade's poem, in which no such person is directly mentioned but a character suggests that "Kinbote" is "a kind of anagram of Botkin or Botkine". In this interpretation, "Gradus" the murderer is an American named Jack Grey who wanted to kill Judge Goldsworth, whose house "Pale Fire's" commentator—whatever his "true" name is—is renting. Goldsworth had condemned Grey to an asylum from which he escaped shortly before mistakenly killing Shade, who resembled Goldsworth.

Other readers see a story quite different from the apparent narrative. "Shadeans" maintain that John Shade wrote not only the poem, but the commentary as well, having invented his own death and the character of Kinbote as a literary device. According to Boyd, Andrew Field invented the Shadean theory and Julia Bader expanded it; Boyd himself espoused the theory for a time. In an alternative version of the Shadean theory, Tiffany DeRewal and Matthew Roth argued that Kinbote is not a separate person but is a dissociated, alternative personality of John Shade. (An early reviewer had mentioned that "a case might be made" for such a reading.) "Kinboteans", a decidedly smaller group, believe that Kinbote invented the existence of John Shade. Boyd credits the Kinbotean theory to Page Stegner and adds that most of its adherents are newcomers to the book. Some readers see the book as oscillating undecidably between these alternatives, like the Rubin vase (a drawing that may be two profiles or a goblet).

Though a minority of commentators believe or at least accept the possibility that Zembla is as "real" as New Wye, most assume that Zembla, or at least the operetta-quaint and homosexually gratified palace life enjoyed by Charles Kinbote before he is overthrown, is imaginary in the context of the story. The name "Zembla" (taken from "Nova Zembla", a former latinization of Novaya Zemlya) may evoke popular fantasy literature about royalty such as The Prisoner of Zenda. As in other Nabokov books, however, the fiction is an exaggerated or comically distorted version of his own life as a son of privilege before the Russian Revolution and an exile afterwards, and the central murder has resemblances (emphasized by Priscilla Meyer) to Nabokov's father's murder by an assassin who was trying to kill someone else.

Still other readers de-emphasize any sort of "real story" and may doubt the existence of such a thing. In the interplay of allusions and thematic links, they find a multifaceted image of English literature, criticism, or glimpses of a higher world and an afterlife.

== Allusions and references ==
The first two lines of John Shade's 999-line poem, "Pale Fire", have become Nabokov's most quoted couplet:

I was the shadow of the waxwing slain
By the false azure in the windowpane

Like many of Nabokov's fictions, Pale Fire alludes to others of his. "Hurricane Lolita" is mentioned, and "Pnin" appears as a minor character. There are many resemblances to "Ultima Thule" and "Solus Rex", two short stories by Nabokov intended to be the first two chapters of a novel in Russian that he never continued. The placename Thule appears in Pale Fire, as does the phrase solus rex (a chess problem in which one player has no pieces but the king).

The book is also full of references to culture, nature, and literature. They include:

- Bobolink
- Maud Bodkin
- The Brothers Karamazov
- Robert Browning, including "My Last Duchess" and Pippa Passes (inspired in a wood near Dulwich)
- Cedar, including a colloquial American meaning, juniper
- Ben Chapman. Some have said the newspaper headline "Red Sox Beat Yanks 5–4 On Chapman's Homer" was genuine and "[u]nearthed by Nabokov in the stacks of the Cornell Library", but others have stated no such game occurred. However, a different player, Sam Chapman of the Philadelphia Athletics, did hit a home run in the 9th inning on September 29, 1938, to defeat the Yankees, 5–4.
- Charles II of England
- Charles VI of France, known as Charles the Well-Beloved and Charles the Mad
- Disa orchid and the butterflies Erebia disa and E. embla (which may lead to Disa and Embla)
- T. S. Eliot and Four Quartets
- "Der Erlkönig"
- Et in Arcadia ego
- Thomas Flatman
- Edsel Ford (poet) and the poem "The Image of Desire"
- Forever Amber
- Robert Frost and the poems "Stopping by Woods on a Snowy Evening" and possibly "Of a Winter's Evening"
- Oliver Goldsmith
- Gradus ad Parnassum
- Gutnish
- Thomas Hardy and the poem "Friends Beyond" (for the word "stillicide")
- Bret Harte and his character Colonel Starbottle
- Hebe and the poem "Vesennyaya Groza" ("Spring Thunderstorm") by Fyodor Tyutchev
- Sherlock Holmes and "The Adventure of the Empty House"
- A Hero of Our Time
- A. E. Housman, including "To an Athlete Dying Young"
- In Memoriam A.H.H.
- Strange Case of Dr Jekyll and Mr Hyde
- Samuel Johnson, James Boswell, Boswell's Life of Johnson and Hodge
- James Joyce
- Kalevala
- John Keats, including "La Belle Dame sans Merci"
- The Konungs skuggsjá or Royal Mirror
- Krummholz
- Jean de La Fontaine and "The Ant and the Grasshopper" (or cicada)
- Franklin Knight Lane
- Angus McDiarmid or MacDiarmid, author of Striking and Picturesque Delineations...
- The Magi, including Balthasar and Melchior
- Novaya Zemlya
- Papilio nitra (now P. zelicaon nitra) and P. indra
- Parthenocissus
- Edgar Allan Poe and the poem "To One in Paradise" (for the phrase "Dim gulf")
- Alexander Pope and Jonathan Swift
- Marcel Proust
- François Rabelais
- Red admiral butterfly, Vanessa atalanta
- Alberto Santos-Dumont
- Walter Scott, including "Glenfinlas, or Lord Ronald's Coronach", "The Lady of the Lake", and The Pirate
- Robert Southey, in particular, the Poet Laureate's rivalry to Lord Byron as alluded to in the latter's Don Juan dedication
- Speyeria diana and S. atlantis
- Thormodus Torfaeus
- Waxwing
- Pierinae
- Word golf
- William Wordsworth, including "The River Wye", and Samuel Taylor Coleridge, including "Kubla Khan"
- Lev Yashin, a "stupendous Dynamo goalkeeper"

See also The Ambidextrous Universe, a later book referencing Pale Fire which in turn triggered a reciprocal response in a subsequent Nabokov novel (Ada, 1969).

== Reception and legacy ==
According to Norman Page, Pale Fire excited as diverse criticism as any of Nabokov's novels. Mary McCarthy's review was extremely laudatory; the Vintage edition excerpts it on the front cover. She tried to explicate hidden references and connections. Dwight Macdonald responded by saying the book was "unreadable" and both it and McCarthy's review were as pedantic as Kinbote. Anthony Burgess, like McCarthy, extolled the book, while Alfred Chester condemned it as "a total wreck".

Some other early reviews were less decided, praising the book's satire and comedy but noting its difficulty and finding its subject slight or saying that its artistry offers "only a kibitzer's pleasure". Macdonald called the reviews he had seen, other than McCarthy's, "cautiously unfavorable". Time's 1962 review stated that "Pale Fire does not really cohere as a satire; good as it is, the novel in the end seems to be mostly an exercise in agility – or perhaps in bewilderment", though this did not prevent the publication from including the book in its 2005 list of the 100 best English-language novels published since 1923.

The connection between Pale Fire and hypertext was stated soon after its publication; in 1969, the information-technology researcher Ted Nelson obtained permission from the novel's publishers to use it for a hypertext demonstration at Brown University. A 2009 paper by Annalisa Volpone also compares Pale Fire to hypertext.

The first Russian translation of the novel, one created by Véra Nabokov, its dedicatee, was published in 1983 by Ardis in Ann Arbor, Michigan. (Alexei Tsvetkov initially played an important role in this translation.)

After Nabokov's reputation was rehabilitated in the Soviet Union (his novels started being published there in 1986 and the first book composed entirely of Nabokov's works was printed in 1988), Pale Fire was published in 1991 in Sverdlovsk (in Sergei Ilyin's Russian translation).

It was ranked 53rd on the list of the Modern Library 100 Best Novels and 1st on the American literary critic Larry McCaffery's 20th Century's Greatest Hits: 100 English-Language Books of Fiction.
