= Neo-Benshi =

Providing live alternate voice-overs for movies

Neo-Benshi is the practice of producing live alternate voice-overs for movies.

The art form’s acknowledged starting point is in Korea, Japan, Taiwan and other East Asian nations during the silent film era. Benshi is a Japanese word referring to the oral "interpreter" who performed a live narrative accompaniment to silent movies, in lieu of showing intertitles with dialogue, etc. In Korean the practice is known as pyônsa. Currently, it is finding a resurgence among experimental poets in the San Francisco Bay area and Los Angeles.

== Movietelling ==
Movietelling is a reinstatement, or retelling, of the film narrator practice(s). Long time practitioner and one of the foremost scholars on the subject of live film narration, Walter Lew, coined this phrase with the intention of reviving and revamping what he considers to have been an international practice, finding its roots throughout Europe, Asia, and the United States. In January 2008, Lew, along with several poets and video artists, began shadoWord productions, an organization dedicated to the practice, as well as the evolution, of Movietelling.

== See also ==
- Audience participation
- Dubbing
- Fandub
