= Xiangyang Market =

Former market in Shanghai, China

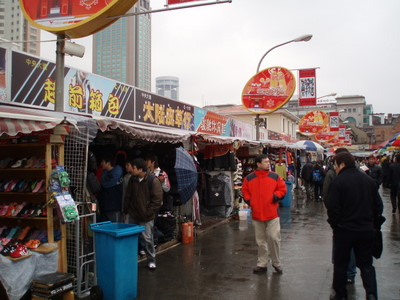
Xiangyang Market in 2006

Xiangyang Market (also known as Xiangyang Road Market or Xiangyang Road Clothing and Gift Market) was a bazaar located at 999 Huaihai Road in Xuhui, Shanghai, China. Best known for the sale of counterfeit goods and its bartering atmosphere, the market existed from November 2000 to June 2006 and contained nearly 900 shops.

== History ==
In 2000, Huating Road Clothing Market was closed and reformed as Xiangyang Market on Huaihai Road. Tenants would pay monthly rent to the market's management company, which leased the land from the city. At the time of Xiangyang's closure, it contained 874 shops, which mainly sold counterfeit items, such as DVDs, Rolex watches, and clothing brands like Chanel, Dior, Gucci, Hermès, and Louis Vuitton.

In July 2002, it was reported that Western tourists were attacked with needles at the market in separate incidents. In early 2006, Sun Hung Kai Properties acquired the land from Mando Group for HK$3.6 billion, as the latter could not afford to redevelop it. Sun Hung Kai stated that they intended to use the land for hotels, office buildings, and shopping malls. Li Zhongzheng, director of the Xuhui District Economic Commission, stated that it would be used to create subway lines. On 30 June, Xiangyang Market closed permanently. Over the next two weeks, the land was cleared, with the market and nearby homes being demolished. By 2013, IAPM Mall was built in its place.

== See also ==
- Backstroke of the West, a bootleg DVD that was purchased at Xiangyang Market
