= Rolling the R's =

1997 book by R. Zamora Linmark

- First edition
- Author: R. Zamora Linmark
- Language: English
- Genre: Novel
- Publisher: Kaya Press
- Publication place: United States
- Media type: Print (Paperback)
- Pages: 165 pp (first edition, hardback)
- ISBN: 978-1-885030-03-0 (first edition, paperback)

Rolling the R's is a coming of age novel written by Filipino-American author R. Zamora Linmark and published in 1997. Rolling the R's, set in the 1970s in Hawaii, follows several adolescent Filipino characters as they grapple with the difficulties of fitting in as immigrants, discovering their sexualities, and deal with the social structure of in their community. The novel is written from a variety of perspectives, switching between main characters' perspectives in order to develop individual narratives. Linmark draws partially on his own experience as a Filipino-American immigrant to guide the plot. Linmark frequently references pop culture (Charlie's Angels, Donna Summer, and countless other unmistakable cultural relics of the 1970s), demonstrating his characters' awareness of mainstream American culture. Narrated in Pidgin English, Linmark develops his characters across various settings including the home, school, and the streets of Hawaii. The story is told in non-linear progression, presenting the young, queer characters across settings to show how they all stray from typical depictions of pre-teen protagonists. Throughout the novel, Linmark shows how racism and ethnic prejudice, conflicts over language, social norms regarding sexuality outside of marriage, and prejudice against gay men and boys govern the lives of his young protagonists.

The novel was well received, prompting a 20th anniversary reprinting in 2015. Linmark also adapted his novel into a play by the same name set to be performed in Honolulu, Hawaii in late 2018.

== Author background ==
R. Zamora Linmark is a Filipino-American novelist, poet, and playwright who was born in 1968 in Manila, Philippines. Linmark moved to Hawaii in 1978 at the age of 10 and became an immigrant student in the Hawaiian school system. He often addresses Filipino/a stereotypes in his writing, drawing from his own experience. His other works include multiple collections of poetry and his 2011 novel Leche, which also tells the story of Filipino immigrants. He has received fellowships from the Japan-United States Friendship Commission, the National Endowment for the Arts and the Fulbright Foundation.

== Synopsis ==
R. Zamora Linmark presents the story of Rolling the R’s in a series of vignettes, offering readers glimpses into the lives of young people exploring their sexuality, education, assimilation into mainstream American society, and other aspects of their identity. The protagonists of the story are a group of fifth grade students living in Kalihi, Hawaii during the 1970s. There is no clear plot line, but there are specific character developments throughout the story. Edgar becomes more confident about his sexuality and gains more control over the ways he uses his body. With Edgar's help, Vicente also begins to accept his queer sexuality. The recent immigrants (Florante, Mai Lin, Vicente) become more comfortable with their language usage, consequentially also becoming more confident in their ethnic identities and racial histories. Examples of racial and ethnic prejudice between groups, and the stress caused by their teachers' demands that they speak standard English in the classroom rather than pidgin, become more pervasive throughout the novel. These experiences cause the characters to gain self-confidence and strengthen their friendships in order to maintain their sense of well-being in Kalihi.

== Characters ==
Edgar Ramirez: A young gay Filipino student in the Kalihi school system who often speaks in Pidgin English. His sexuality is often the target of ridicule, exhibited by the opening vignette "Blame It On Chachi" in which the homophobic epithet "faggot" is hurled at Edgar from an unspecified narrator. Edgar's flamboyant demeanor and love for pop culture helps guide the plot of the vignettes. His story most evidently reflects the rupture of childhood innocence as he explicitly describes his sexy escapades with Mr. Campos, the school janitor.

Florante Sanchez: A recent immigrant from the Philippines who attends school with Edgar, Katrina, Vicente and the other children. He comes from a family of writers and has a talent with the English language which sets him apart from the majority of his friends who communicate in creole languages, Tagalog, or Ilocano. Florante is praised by his teachers for his intelligence, but despite their discouragement, he remains a part of Edgar, Katrina, and Vicente's friend group.

Katherine "Katrina-Trina" Cruz: A Filipino-American student who attends school in Kalihi and is one of Edgar's best friends. Trina is sexually active, yet again breaking the expectations of childhood innocence. She and her mother are often the subjects of gossip around town as they are known to be promiscuous. They also receive criticism for their non-traditional family structure—Trina's parents were not married when she was born, and her mother is apparently a single parent—but Katrina seems unbothered by the criticisms she receives, demonstrating her perseverance.

Vicente De Los Reyes: a recent Filipino immigrant growing into his queer identity. Vicente is described as artistic, kind, and thoughtful, and is the most quiet of the friends in the main character group. He is respectful and understanding, which is presented as a reflection of his family's commitment to respectability.

Ms. Takara: teacher of immigrant students in the Kalihi school district. Ms. Takara is a Japanese-American who teaches corrective pronunciation to the recent immigrants in order to help the students learn how to speak standard English. The immigrant students are removed from class regularly and taken to a small room on the opposite side of the school for lessons in how to speak standard English.

Mrs. Takemoto: another Japanese-American teacher in the Kalihi area. Trina's mom sleeps with her husband, and Mrs. Takemoto is apparently aware of this, which creates an antagonistic relationship between Trina and Mrs. Takemoto in the classroom.

Da Manong Gang: a group of first and second generation Asian immigrants who have formed a violent and somewhat mythical gang within the school. This group symbolizes the physical embodiment of all of the negative stereotypes about Filipino immigrants. Their violence and vagrancy terrifies the teachers and students.

== Historical context ==
The Philippines have a long colonial history, dating back to 1521 when they were colonized by Spain. The Spanish remained in the Philippines until the Spanish–American War of 1898. In fact, the title Rolling the R's refers to the tendency of Filipino immigrants to roll their r's while speaking in English, a linguistic hold-over from Ilocano, a Filipino language which is rooted in Spanish influence. Spanish rule ended in 1898 but the Philippines experienced 48 more years of outside domination by the United States and Japan before they gained independence in 1946. Though this colonization and subjugation lies in the past, it continues to affect relations between countries and between peoples in the modern day. Colonial history has produced a “‘colonial mentality’, an aspiration to be like the colonizer or remain in a dependant, colonized state in order to inhibit development. Though Rolling the R's does not take place in the Philippines, the colonial history of the Philippines has traveled to the US with Filipino immigrants for over a century.

Filipino men were originally imported to Hawaii in the early 1900s to work on Hawaii's plantations following annexation of the Philippines by the US. Almost all were illiterate because the plantation owners assumed the illiterate farm workers from rural areas would not organize or challenge their working conditions. As the years went on, Filipinos retained this subjugated identity as manual laborers with Japanese-Americans, Chinese-Americans, Portuguese-Americans and Caucasian-Americans in positions of dominance over them (even through the 1980s). From 1893 to 1954, Hawaii was ruled by a white oligarchy that was almost completely separate socially and politically from the rest of the population, and native-Hawaiians and Asian immigrants were expected to accept white rule. Between 1911 and 1944, 80% of people hanged for murder in Hawaii were Filipino though they only made up 1/6 of the population, representing a wave of immense violence against Filipino-Americans. Japanese-Americans gained political power in 1954 and created a somewhat more democratic system of governance in Hawaii, but they also joined the existing Caucasian ruling class at the top of the power structure. Through 1980, this pattern of hierarchy remained, resulting in a preponderance of Filipino-Americans in Hawaii who had lower paying jobs, less education, and a lack of political power despite constituting a significant portion of the Hawaiian population. Since Rolling the R's takes place in the 1970s, these historical inequalities are essential to understanding the mindset of the characters and the motivation behind their actions.

== Themes ==
=== Education ===
The education system has played a role in determining the economic and social status of Filipino-Americans since they first arrived in Hawaii in the beginning of the 20th century. The first Filipino-American immigrants were illiterate adult men who were not expected to go to school and who did not need to speak English in order to work on the plantations. In the 1920s, authorities created a system of 'tracking' with 3 levels which were created to afford special attention to Caucasian children and any others who were fluent in English. Filipinos disproportionately filled in the lower levels of this tracking system and as grades ascend, the performance levels of Filipinos actually declined. Until the mid 1970s, students who did not speak English had no right or access to bilingual or native language instruction at school, propelling them into the lower strata of the education system. As of 1984, one quarter of Hawaiian schools remained racially segregated according to federal standards although this was due to geography rather than educational policies. The educational environment, especially that which surrounds linguistic education, in Rolling the R's reflects these historically ingrained educational hierarchies.

In Rolling the R's, Mrs. Takemoto's immense surprise upon discovering Florante's English language talent reflects the low expectations n Filipino-American students. Additionally, the linguistic discrimination present in the educational environment mirrors the racial hierarchy established in greater Hawaii. Though Filipino dialects hold power within the immigrant community, they often represent weakness in interactions outside of Filipino communities. The teachers and administrators at the protagonists’ schools recognize a distinct and immovable hierarchy of languages which places ‘proper’ English at the top, pidgin English below it, and non-English languages at the bottom. She and Ms. Takara repeatedly discourage the use of pidgin English in favor of the mainstream "standard English" spoken in the larger community; this discourages some Filipino-American students' effective learning and social growth. This lack of encouragement or pride in Filipino languages, culture, or history promotes educational complacency and disinterest among Filipino-American students, which can lead to poor performance and lack of engagement.

=== Gender and sexuality ===
The issues of gender and sexuality permeate the book. From Edgar's label as "faggot" to Katrina's descriptions of sex with her boyfriend, R. Zamora Linmark urges readers to recognize the depths of children's experiences with these subjects, whether they want to accept it or not. Homophobia and transphobia among Asian and Asian-American populations is actually a vestige of late 19th and early 20th century European colonialism in Asia, which brought the conservative Western opinions of sexuality and gender to the continent. As a result, most LGBT Asian Americans find it difficult to come out to their Asian and Asian-American peers due to the sentiment that LGBT people are largely ignored or repressed in the broader Asian and Asian-American cultures. These same LGBT Asian-Americans, however, also often report feeling excluded from the LGBT community as a result of their racial and ethnic identities. The shame and stigma surrounding issues of sexuality in Rolling the R's draws on the shame and stigma experienced by LGBT Asian-Americans in the real world. However, Asian-Americans also report higher rates of acceptance and openness about sexuality among friends, coworkers, and employers than their Asian counterparts.

For LGBT Filipino-Americans, there are specific controlling images which influence the way that they are viewed by the larger Filipino-American community. The term "bakla" is used throughout Rolling the R's to describe Edgar and other characters who perform gender outside of their assigned male role through homosexuality or gender exploration. Bakla has no specific meaning, but rather refers gays to gay men, cross-dressing men or transgender people assigned male at birth. The term tomboy serves a similar purpose for women, labeling those with non-traditional gender or sexual practices as lesbians or too masculine in manner or dress. LGBT Filipino-Americans often report feeling as if coming out, especially to family, would be unsafe, excessive, and shameful. This shame and fear is reflected in Vicente's hesitance to explore his LGBT identity or be flamboyant. His father abuses him physically when he acts outside of his assigned male role and he receives verbal reinforcement of stereotypes from the gossip on the island which follows Edgar and other openly LGBT characters. It is evident that stereotypes within the broader Asian-American community and the Filipino-American community in the novel effect the ways in which the protagonists understand gender and sexuality.

=== Immigration and racism ===
Because many of the main characters in Rolling the R's are first or second generation immigrants, R. Zamora Linmark addresses immigrant identities and issues often. For example, both Filipino men and women experience exoticization in the US as a result of their distinctive phenotypical traits. In a 2009 study of phenotypical traits and discrimination, researchers found that darker skin was associated with lower income and poorer physical health for both females and males. More ethnic features also seemed to heighten income disparity only for female participants, meaning that immigrants of any generation must navigate racial prejudice while also adjusting to life in the US. Strong ethnic phenotypical features and traditions often leads to tokenization of Filipino identities and customs, exhibited plainly in the vignette "They Like You Because You Eat Dog" which addresses the stereotypes and tokenism associated with features of Filipino culture. Ethnic identity, however, also serves as one of the strongest mediating factors to combat the effects of racial discrimination.

A great deal of the racial discrimination which Filipino immigrants must face stems from the historical colonial relationship between the US and the Philippines. Following annexation, Filipinos were framed as racially and intellectually inferior in order to justify continued US involvement in the region. Filipinos were described like children: emotional, maladjusted, and unable to make decisions or contribute meaningfully to society without significant guidance Additionally, most Filipinos in Hawaii prior to WWII were young men without wives in the state and who were unemployed due to the depression, leading to a high rate of crime among Filipinos often attributed to inferior culture rather than biased demographics. In 1965, just before the setting of Rolling the R's, Congress passed the US Immigration and Nationality Act which allowed for the reunification of families, meaning that Filipino wives and children who had been left behind could finally come join their male family members in the US. Following the passage of the act, the proportion of immigrants in the broader Filipino-American skyrocketed, making Filipinos far more prone to stereotyping as a result of nativism and backlash. Consequently, the same stereotypical qualities which were applied to the prototypical plantation workers adapted to fit both Filipino men, women, and children well beyond the plantation fields, as demonstrated by the racial tension threaded through much of Rolling the R's.

== Critical reception ==
The novel received praise for its imagination, creativity, authenticity, and commitment to storytelling from LGBT and Asian American authors and academics. The novel received a special 20th anniversary reprinting from the original publisher, Kaya Press, in 2015.

== Publication history ==
- 1995, USA, Kaya Press (ISBN 978-1-885030-02-3), hardcover
- 2016, USA, Kaya Press (ISBN 978-1-885030-51-1), paperback

== See also ==
- Literature in Hawaii
