= Idioms in American Sign Language =

American Sign Language (ASL) is the main language of members of the deaf community in the United States. One component of their language is the use of idioms. The validity of these idioms have often been questioned or confused with metaphorical language. The term idiom can be defined as, "A speech form or an expression of a given language that is peculiar to itself grammatically or cannot be understood from the individual meanings of its elements" (Idiom, 2007). The following examples are written in ASL glossing. These idioms further validate ASL as a language unique and independent of English. Idioms in ASL bond people in the Deaf community because they are expressions that only in-group members can understand.

== Examples ==
"Train go sorry" is one of the most widely used idioms and is similar to the English idiom You missed the boat. Another variation of this idiom is "Cigarette-gone".

"Finish-touch" translates to been there or been to in English.

"Bird-pickhead" means my thought just disappeared or I just forgot now.

"Fish-swallowed" means gullible.

"Cow-it" is roughly translated into I don't care for [something].

"I-I-I", the letter, not "me", signed repeatedly with alternating hands on the chest is an idiom that is translated into the English word egotistical.

However, even examples like "Cow-it" and "I-I-I" remain controversial. There is ambiguity in defining and identifying idioms in American Sign Language as little is known of ASL's use of idioms. Cokely & Baker-Shenk write, "ASL seems to have very few widely-used idioms, according to the standard definition of 'idiom.'"

In their examination of how interpreters approach ASL idioms Santiago and Barrick (2007) cite Rosenthal's (1978) definition of idiom to frame their research:

1. Idioms consist of at least two or more words, which may or may not be contiguous, inflected or in a specific order.
2. Idioms are recurrent constructs...(Some degree of recurrence is necessary to distinguish idioms from metaphors and other style figures).

This is important because some constructs like "Cow-it" and "Cigarette-gone" may not have the incidence of recurrence needed to be considered ASL idioms.

Some authors have noticed that many signs that people often think are idioms in ASL i.e., "Out of sight", "On the fence", "Funny None/Funny Zero", are either sign compounds with transparent meaning ("Funny none" means "not funny") or single-sense lexical items that either cannot be translated into English by using a single lexical item, or whose translation requires an English idiom. According to Battison in Valli and Lucas 1998, "We can show that things that are often called sign 'idioms': are often just ordinary signs that are difficult to translate into English." When compared to the sign "Succeed", which is made with two movements, the sign "At last" is one sharp movement and has historically been called an ASL idiom for the very reason of its non-translatability. But Battison purports that because the "two signs are made differently (they) have different meanings...they are two separate signs." By "misusing" the term idiom in application to American Sign Language, the result is an "obscure" understanding of how "the language really works and it make(s) it seem as if the language is unstructured and simple. Of course, nothing could be further from the truth."

== See also ==
- Profanity in ASL
