= Marta Dynel =

Polish linguist

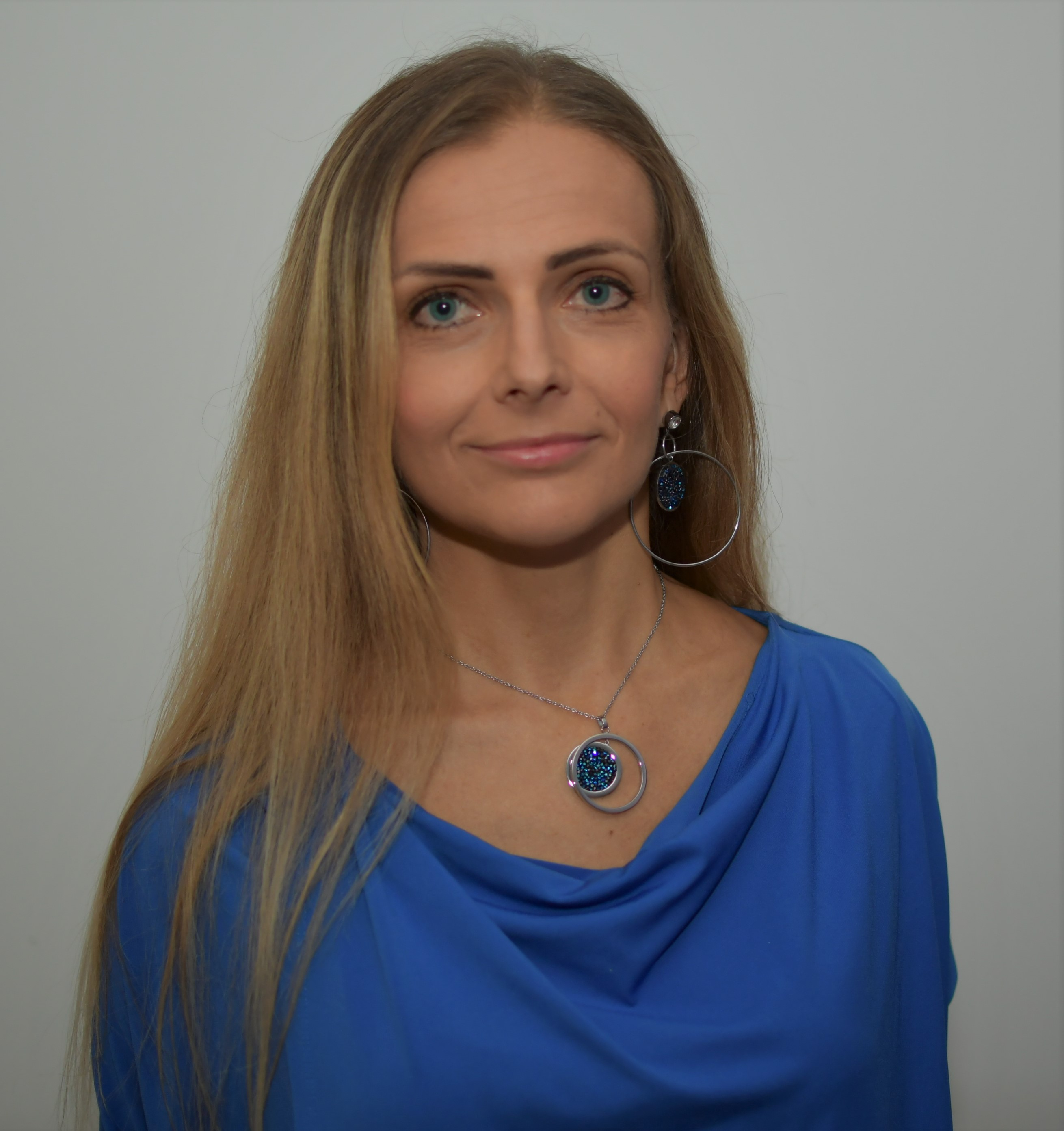

Academic background
- Education: University of Łódź (PhD)
- Thesis: Pragmalinguistic Analysis of Conversational Humour in English (2006)

Academic work
- Discipline: linguistics
- Sub-discipline: pragmatics, discourse analysis
- Institutions: University of Łódź, Vilnius Gediminas Technical University
- Website: http://martadynel.com/

Marta Dynel is a Polish linguist and professor at University of Łódź, Poland. She is known for her works on pragmatics and is the editor-in-chief of the journal Lingua.

== Career ==
Marta Dynel received her PhD (2006) from the University of Łódź, followed by habilitation (dr Litt.) in 2012 and a full professor degree in 2022. She is affiliated with the University of Łódź and Vilnius Gediminas Technical University, holding two research fellow positions. Since the beginning of her academic career, she has studied humour, irony, impoliteness and deception from both theoretical and empirical angles, based on film discourse and social media data.

== Books ==
- Irony, Deception and Humour: Seeking the Truth about Overt and Covert Untruthfulness. Mouton Series in Pragmatics. Mouton de Gruyter. 2018
- Humorous Garden-Paths: A Pragmatic-Cognitive Study. Newcastle: Cambridge Scholars Publishing. 2009
