= R. Zamora Linmark =

American poet

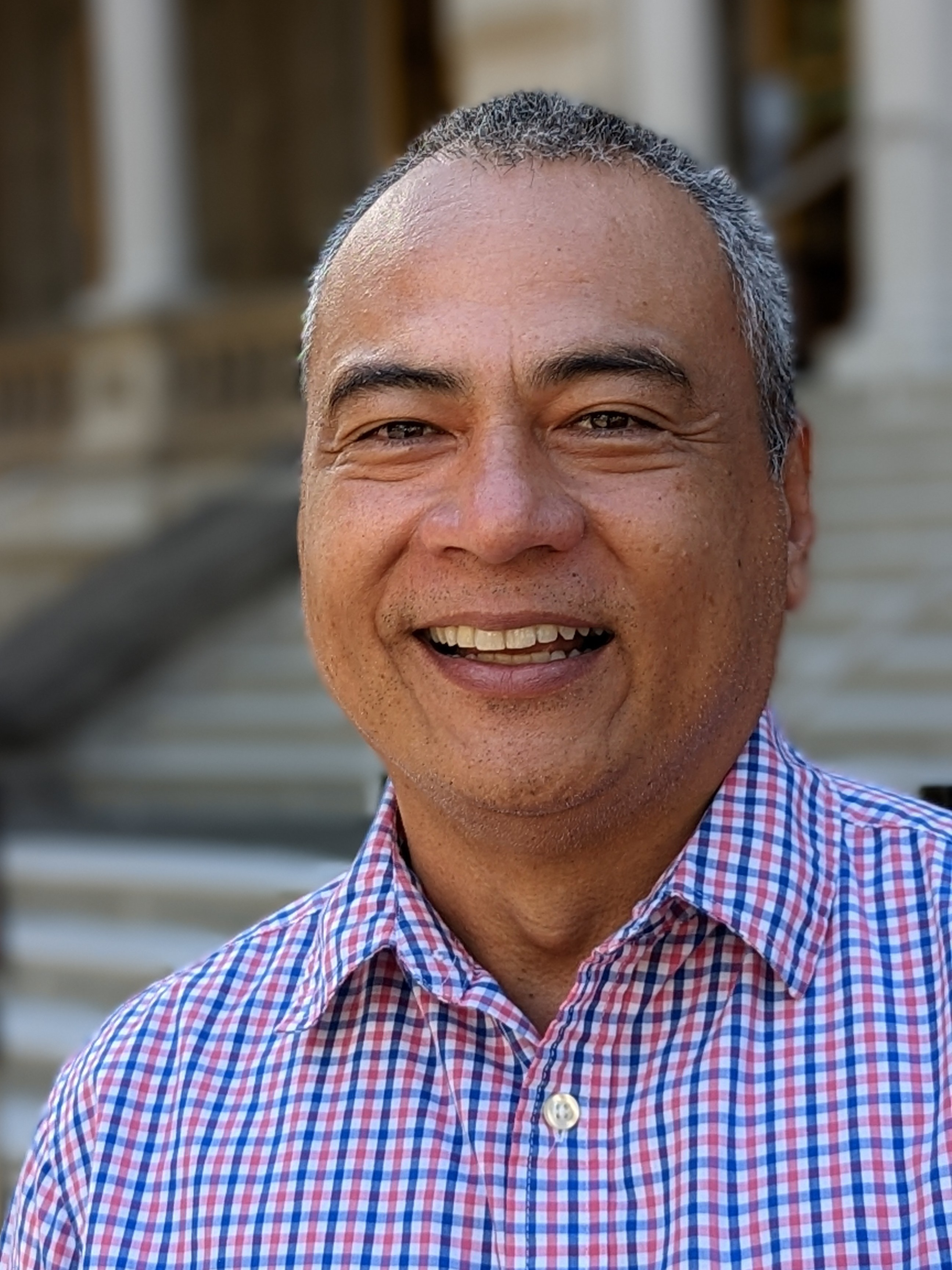
- Linmark in Honolulu, Hawaii, 2022
- Writing career
- Notable works: Rolling the R’s - Novel; Prime Time Apparitions - Poetry; The Evolution of a Sigh - Poetry

R. Zamora Linmark, born in Manila, is a Filipino American poet, novelist, and playwright. He earned a bachelor's degree from the University of Hawaii in Honolulu. He is the recipient of a Japan-United States Friendship Commission, a winner of a National Endowment for the Arts creative writing fellowship in poetry (2001), and was a Fulbright Foundation Senior Lecturer/Researcher in the Philippines (2005-2006). He was a Distinguished Visiting Professor in Creative Writing at the University of Hawaii and University of Miami. His works include Prime-Time Apparitions (2005), The Evolution of a Sigh (2008), Drive-By Vigils (2011), Rolling the R’s (1995), Leche (2011), and The Importance of Being Wilde at Heart (2019); themes involving ethnic and sexual identity are common throughout.

== Professional life ==
His first, a novel, Rolling the R's was released by Kaya Press in 1995. Linmark then went on to adapt it for the stage, receiving a world premiere production from Kumu Kahua in 2008.

Hanging Loose Press published two of Linmark's poetry collections: Prime Time Apparitions (2005) and The Evolution of a Sigh (2008). Of his first collection of poems, Prime Time Apparitions, poet Mark Doty wrote: "...witty and disenchanted, sexy and touched, jangled with longing and the crazed changes the wild new world works." Both of his collections of poetry are available from Hanging Loose Press.

== Personal life ==
In addition to having lived in Tokyo in the past, he currently divides his time between Manila and Honolulu.

== Bibliography ==
- Rolling the R's. Kaya Press (1995)
- Prime Time Apparitions. Hanging Loose Press (2005)
- The Evolution of a Sigh. Hanging Loose Press (2008)
- Leche. Coffee House Press (2011)
- The Importance of Being Wilde at Heart Delacorte Press (2019)
