= Idiom (language structure) =

Syntactical, grammatical, or structural form peculiar to a language

An idiom (the quality of it being known as idiomaticness or idiomaticity) is a syntactical, grammatical, or phonological structure peculiar to a language that is actually realized, as opposed to possible but unrealized structures that could have developed to serve the same semantic functions but did not.

The grammar of a language (its morphology, phonology, and syntax) is inherently arbitrary and peculiar to a specific language (or group of related languages). For example, although in English it is idiomatic (accepted as structurally correct) to say "cats are associated with agility", other forms could have developed, such as "cats associate toward agility" or "cats are associated of agility". Unidiomatic constructions sound wrong to fluent speakers, although they are often entirely comprehensible. For example, the title of the classic book English as She Is Spoke is easy to understand (its idiomatic counterpart is English as It Is Spoken), but it deviates from English idiom in the gender of the pronoun and the inflection of the verb. Lexical gaps are another key example of idiom.

== See also ==
- Bahuvrihi
- Collocation
- Cliché
- Phraseme
- Semantic equivalence (linguistics)
- Usage
- Programming idiom
- Principle of compositionality
