= English as She Is Spoke =

Book by Pedro Carolino

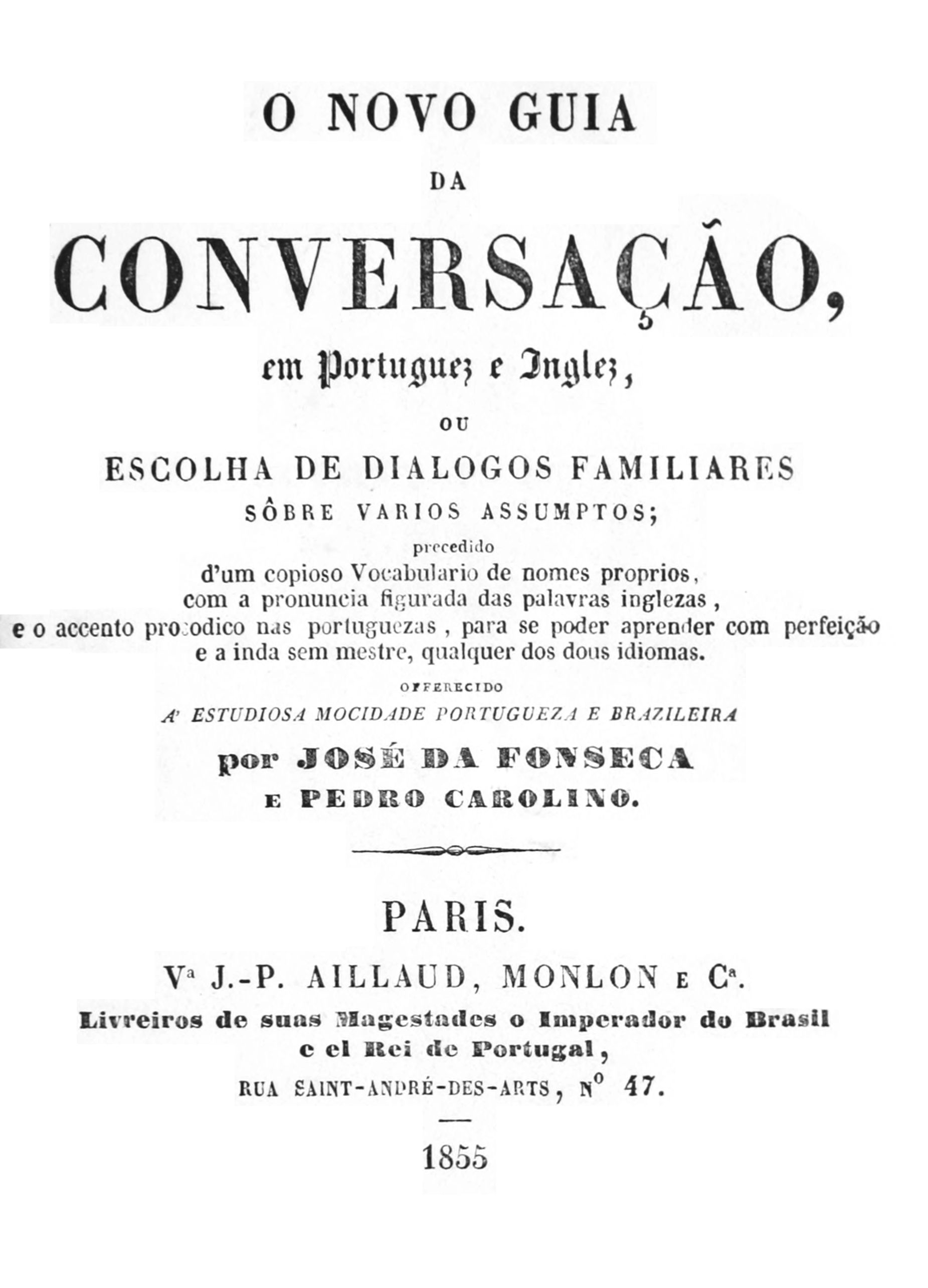
- Author: Pedro Carolino and José da Fonseca (credited)
- Original title: O novo guia da conversação em portuguez e inglez
- Language: Portuguese and English
- Genre: Phrase book
- Publisher: J.P. Aillaud
- Publication date: 1855
- Publication place: France
- Media type: Print
- Pages: 182
- Text: English as She Is Spoke at Wikisource

O novo guia da conversação em portuguez e inglez, (Note: The original full title is O novo guia da conversação em portuguez e inglez, ou Escolha de dialogos familiares sôbre varios assumptos, archaic Portuguese for "The new conversational guide in Portuguese and English, or Choice of familiar dialogues on many subjects".) commonly known by the name English as She Is Spoke, is a 19th-century book written by Pedro Carolino, with some editions crediting José da Fonseca as co-author. It was intended as a Portuguese–English conversational guide book or phrase book. However, it is today regarded entirely as a classic source of unintentional humour in translation because the provided translations are usually inaccurate or unidiomatic.

The humour arises largely from Carolino's indiscriminate use of literal translation, which has led to many idiomatic expressions being translated ineptly. For example, Carolino translates the Portuguese phrase "Quereis mais?" as "Will you more?", when an analogous English phrase is available in the form of "Do you want some more?"

It is widely believed that Carolino could not speak English and that an unknown French–English dictionary was used to translate the earlier Portuguese–French phrase book O novo guia da conversação em francês e português, written by José da Fonseca. Carolino likely added Fonseca's name to the book without the latter's permission in an attempt to give it some credibility. The Portuguese–French phrase book is a competent work free of the defects that characterize the Portuguese–English one, but Carolino's use of literal translation on idiomatic or otherwise non-literal phrases leads to poor translation.

The title English as She Is Spoke was given to the book in its 1883 republication, but the phrase does not appear in the original phrasebook, nor does the word "spoke".

== Cultural appraisals and influence ==
Mark Twain said of English as She Is Spoke "Nobody can add to the absurdity of this book, nobody can imitate it successfully, nobody can hope to produce its fellow; it is perfect."

Stephen Pile mentions this work in The Book of Heroic Failures, commenting: "Is there anything in conventional English which could equal the vividness of 'to craunch a marmoset'?" The original has "to craunch the marmoset", an entry rendered in Portuguese as esperar horas e horas, "to wait for hours and hours", in the book's "Idiotisms and Proverbs" section. This is the author's attempt to translate the French slang idiomatic expression croquer le marmot, used to indicate "waiting patiently for someone to open a door". Croquer refers to a "knocking" or "rapping" sound, and marmot was a term for the grotesque door knockers in vogue at the time. "Craunch" is an archaic term meaning 'to chew' or 'crunch'. In Modern French, croquer usually means "to crunch" (see, e.g., croque monsieur); its use in this idiom is a survival from the Middle French meaning of croquer / crocquer, which meant "to slap, hit, strike".

Tristan Bernard wrote a very short comedy with a similar name, L'Anglais tel qu'on le parle (1899). Ionesco's La Cantatrice chauve (1950) is mostly made of lines used out-of-context from interlingual conversation books. British comedy television series Monty Python's Flying Circus made use of the theme of a mistranslating phrase book in the sketch "Dirty Hungarian Phrasebook" (1970), which may have been inspired by English as She Is Spoke.

== Phrase examples ==
| Sentence in Portuguese | Given translation | Idiomatic translation |
|---|---|---|
| As paredes têm ouvidos. | The walls have hearsay. | The walls have ears. |
| Anda de gatinhas. | He go to four feet. | He's on all fours. |
| A estrada é segura? | Is sure the road? | Is the road safe? |
| Sabe montar a cavalo. | He know ride horse. | He can ride a horse. |
| Quem cala consente. | That not says a word, consent. | Who is silent consents. |
| Que faz ele? | What do him? | What does he do? / What is he doing? |
| Tenho vontade de vomitar. | I have mind to vomit. | I want to vomit. |
| Tenho medo de trovões. | I fear of the thunderbolt. | I am afraid of thunder. |
| Este lago parece-me bem piscoso. Vamos pescar para nos divertirmos. | That pond it seems me many multiplied of fishes. Let us amuse rather to the fishing. | This lake looks full of fish. Let's have some fun fishing. |
| O criado arou a terra real. | The created plough the land real. | The servant ploughed the royal land. |
| Bem sei o que devo fazer ou me compete. | I know well who I have to make. | I know very well what I have to do and what my responsibilities are. |
| Eu ganhei mais de trinta mil réis. | I had gained ten lewis. | I won more than thirty thousand réis. |
| Entendeste / entendeu o que eu disse? | Have you understant that y have said? | Did you understand what I said? |
| Não diga tal. Vm. já fala bem. (Note: "Vm." is an abbreviation of vossemecê, an archaic form of the second-person singular pronoun você.) | You jest, you does express you self very well. | Don't say that. You already speak very well. |
| Elle dá coices pelo que vejo. Olhe como eu o soube domar. | Then he kicks for that I look? Sook here if I knew to tame hix. | [To a horse rider] From what I see, he kicks. Look at how I was able to tame him. |

In addition to the examples above, Carolino managed to create a number of words which added to the book's unintentionally comic effect. Many can be found in the "Familiar Dialogues" and "Idiotisms and Proverbs" sections.

== Publication history ==
- 1853 – In Paris, J.-P. Aillaud, Monlon e Ca published a Portuguese–French phrase book entitled O novo guia da conversação em francês e português by José da Fonseca. The Biblioteca Nacional de Portugal (National Library of Portugal) has a copy of this book with catalog number L.686P. Another copy of this book is in the Bibliothèque nationale de France (National Library of France) under the catalog number FRBNF30446608.
- 1855 – In Paris, J.-P. Aillaud, Monlon e Ca published a Portuguese–English phrase book entitled O Novo Guia da Conversação, em Português e Inglês, em Duas Partes (literally, The new guide to conversation, in Portuguese and English, in Two Parts), with authorship attributed to José da Fonseca and Pedro Carolino. A copy of this book is in the Bibliothèque nationale de France under the catalog number FRBNF30446609. Another copy is in the Bodleian Library, Oxford.
- 1883 – The book was published in London as English as She is Spoke. The first American edition, published in Boston, also came out this year, with an introduction by Mark Twain.
- 1969 – The book was re-published in New York by Dover Publications, under the title English as she is spoke; the new guide of the conversation in Portuguese and English (ISBN 0-486-22329-9).
- 2002 – A new edition edited by Paul Collins was published under the Collins Library imprint of McSweeney's (ISBN 0-9719047-4-X).
- 2002 – Brazilian edition of the copies of the 1855 edition held in the Bibliothèque nationale de France and the Bodleian Library, published by Casa da Palavra, Rio de Janeiro (ISBN 85-87220-56-X).
- 2004 – A revised paperback version of the above Collins Library edition was published (ISBN 1-932416-11-0).

== Related titles ==
The phrase inspired some other publications, notably:

- English as she is wrote (1883)
- Ingglish az she iz spelt (1885), by "Fritz Federheld" (pseudonym of Frederick Atherton Fernald)
- English as she is taught (1887), also with introduction by Mark Twain
- Music As She Is Wrote (1915), a humorous dictionary of musical terms by the British composer/conductor Frederic Hymen Cowen
- English Opera as She is Wrote (1918), opera burlesque organized by Jane Joseph satirizing operatic composers like Verdi, Wagner, Debussy, which Gustav Holst participated in
- Britain as she is visit, a spoof tourist guide in a similar style to the original book, by Paul Jennings, British Life (M Joseph, 1976)
- Elvish as She Is Spoke (2006), by Carl F. Hostetter, from The Lord of the Rings 1954–2004: Scholarship in Honor of Richard E. Blackwelder (Marquette, 2006), ed. Wayne G. Hammond and Christina Scull
- Rails as she is spoke (2012), a humorous guide about OOP problems in the Ruby on Rails web application framework, by Giles Bowkett

== Contemporary allusions ==
The phrase English as she is spoke is nowadays used allusively, in a form of linguistic play, as a stereotypical example of bad English grammar.

In January 1864, then US President Abraham Lincoln and Secretary of State William H. Seward laughed as Lincoln's private secretary John Hay read aloud from the book. The book has been cited as one example of many diversions that Lincoln used to lighten his heart and mind from the weight of the US Civil War and his cabinet's political infighting.

In the Monty Python's Flying Circus sketch "Dirty Hungarian Phrasebook", a man unknowingly causes trouble by reading from a Hungarian–English phrasebook with deliberately mistranslated phrases that are absurd or inappropriate. The sketch ends with the publisher of the book being questioned in court; he pleads "incompetence".

== See also ==
- Engrish, broken English common among Asian learners
- My postillion has been struck by lightning, a strange phrase often attributed to interlingual phrasebooks
- Dirty Hungarian Phrasebook
- A Description of the Beauties of Edinample and Lochearnhead, a 19th-century work in broken English also considered unintentionally humorous
- All your base are belong to us, a once widespread Internet meme based on a mis-translation in a video game.
- Terms for some varieties of English intermixed with other languages:
  - Porglish, with Portuguese
  - Danglish, with Danish
  - Denglisch, with German (Deutsch)
  - Dunglish, with Dutch
  - Franglais, with French
  - Spanglish, with Spanish
  - Chinglish, with Chinese
  - Konglish, with Korean
