= Mozart and the Wolf Gang =

1991 novel by Anthony Burgess

First edition (publ. Hutchinson) Cover artist (bottom): Henri Félix Emmanuel Philippoteaux, Les Gentilshommes du Duc d'Orléans 1839

Mozart and the Wolf Gang is a 1991 novel by Anthony Burgess about the life and world of Wolfgang Amadeus Mozart. Published in the U.K. under this title, in the U.S. it was published as On Mozart: A Paean for Wolfgang, Being a Celestial Colloquy, an Opera Libretto, a Film Script, a Schizophrenic Dialogue, a Bewildered Rumination.

Among other things, it attempts to fictionalize Mozart's Symphony No. 40.

This is one of numerous Burgess books in which music figures prominently, others being A Vision of Battlements; The Worm and the Ring; The Malayan Trilogy; A Clockwork Orange, especially for its use of Beethoven's Symphony No. 9; Honey for the Bears; Napoleon Symphony: A Novel in Four Movements, which is modeled structurally on Beethoven's Symphony No. 3; The End of the World News; Any Old Iron; The Devil's Mode and Other Stories; The Pianoplayers, about the music hall era; and Byrne: A Novel.

Mozart and the Wolf Gang brings to life various composers through fictional representations: Prokofiev, Gershwin, Elgar, Rossini, Mendelssohn, Berlioz, Wagner and Schoenberg feature in various dialogues.
