= Wolfgang Krege =

German author and translator

Wolfgang Krege (1 February 1939 in Berlin – 13 April 2005 in Stuttgart) was a German author and translator.

== Life and work ==
Wolfgang Krege was born and raised in Berlin. In the early 1960s he began studying philosophy at the Free University of Berlin. Afterwards he worked as editor of lexica, as copywriter and editor for publishing houses. In the 1970s he started translating texts, initially focusing on non-fiction.

=== Tolkien literature ===
He gained a greater readership by his translation of J. R. R. Tolkien's book The Silmarillion. In the 1990s he retranslated The Hobbit; compared to the earlier translation by Walter Scherf, who had left out or shortened most of the poems and songs embedded into the plot, and which moreover contained illustrations by children's books illustrator Klaus Ensikat, Krege's version rather appeals to a more grown-up readership. Another difference is made by a lack of adherence to the original: Krege has a tendency to write a funnier and fancier book than the original Hobbit. Thereby various sentences are interpreted in a way which cannot any more be regarded as translation but is clearly new script. Additionally, Krege's version features a number of modern words like "Hurricane" which can easily be seen atypical for the medievally and European inspired Middle-earth (although Tolkien's original as well does contain words like "football" or "express train"). Krege's translation of place names though is closer to the original script. Where "Rivendell" remained untranslated by Scherf, Krege used Bruchtal and standardised the place names according to the German translation of The Lord of the Rings by Margaret Carroux and E.-M. von Freymann (Klett-Cotta 1969/1970). He also eradicated earlier misinterpretations of English "Elf" to German "Fee" (fairy), where Tolkien explicitly wished to distinguish his elves from the diminutive airy-winged fairies.

Krege's retranslation of The Lord of the Rings (Ger.: Der Herr der Ringe) is highly disputed among fans. The new German interpretation of 2002 tries stronger than the old Carroux version to reflect the different style of speech employed by the various characters in the book. In the old German translation the speech is quite uniform throughout the plot – moderately old-fashioned and according to some critics even artificially folksy. The English original though features various layers of speech, from a 16th-century Bible style to the rustic and urban, sometimes gross, common British English of the 1940s, i.e. the time of its being written. Krege tries to imitate this in German, but used the German language of the 1990s as a reference rather than the 1940s. For example, he translated Samwise Gamgee's often-employed phrase "Master Frodo" to "Chef" (German (and French): boss; not to be confused with English "master cook") - a term which a number of fans of classic fantasy literature in German-speaking countries think of as totally improper. In Wolfgang Krege's translation, the appendices to The Lord of the Rings are for the first time completely translated to German, save for one part.

=== Other translations ===
Krege wrote also an (equally disputed) retranslation of Anthony Burgess' A Clockwork Orange as well as other works by Burgess. In addition, Krege was the standard translator to German for works by Amélie Nothomb.

== Selected works ==
=== As an author ===
- Begriffe der Gruppendynamik (Terms of Group Dynamics), Konzepte der Humanwissenschaften, Stuttgart 1977 (ISBN 3-12-904920-7)
- Handbuch der Weisen von Mittelerde (Handbook of Middle-earth Scholars), Stuttgart 2001 (ISBN 3-608-93311-5)
- Elbisches Wörterbuch Quenya und Sindarin. Nach J. R. R. Tolkiens Schriften (Elvish dictionary Quenya and Sindarin. According to J. R. R. Tolkien's Writings), Stuttgart 2003 (ISBN 3-608-93185-6)

=== As a translator ===
- Leland P. Bradford (ed.): T-group-theory and laboratory method (Gruppen-Training. T-Gruppentheorie und Laboratoriumsmethode, Texte zur Gruppendynamik, Stuttgart 1972, ISBN 3-12-901410-1)
- Pierre Morin: Le développement des organisations (Einführung in die angewandte Organisationspsychologie, Konzepte der Humanwissenschaften, Stuttgart 1974, ISBN 3-12-905800-1)
- William Kenneth Richmond: The free school (Freie Schule, offene Universität, Cologne 1975, ISBN 3-462-01049-2 oder ISBN 3-462-01050-6)
- Georges Lapassade: L' arpenteur (Der Landvermesser oder die Universitätsreform findet nicht statt. Ein Soziodrama in 5 Akten, Stuttgart 1976, ISBN 3-12-905020-5)
- William Goldman: The Princess Bride (Die Brautprinzessin. S. Morgensterns klassische Erzählung von wahrer Liebe und edlen Abenteuern, Stuttgart 1977, ISBN 3-12-902960-5)
- Michel Odent: Bien naître (Die sanfte Geburt. Die Leboyer-Methode in der Praxis, München 1978, 6. Auflage als ''Die sanfte Geburt, Munich 1986, ISBN 3-466-34008-X)
- J. R. R. Tolkien: The Silmarillion (Das Silmarillion, Stuttgart 1978, recently Stuttgart 2001, ISBN 3-608-93245-3)
- Lewis Yablonsky: Psychodrama (Psychodrama. Die Lösung emotionaler Probleme durch das Rollenspiel, Konzepte der Humanwissenschaften, Stuttgart 1978, ISBN 3-12-909000-2)
- Kai T. Erikson: Wayward Puritans (Die widerspenstigen Puritaner. Zur Soziologie abweichenden Verhaltens, Konzepte der Humanwissenschaften/Angewandte Wissenschaft, Stuttgart 1978, ISBN 3-12-902070-5)
- Humphrey Carpenter: J. R. R. Tolkien (J. R. R. Tolkien. Eine Biographie, Stuttgart 1979, ISBN 3-12-901460-8)
- Alice Hoffman: Property of (Auf dem Rücken, Stuttgart 1979, ISBN 3-12-903820-5)
- Anthony Burgess: Tremor of Intent (Tremor, Stuttgart 1980, ISBN 3-12-900521-8)
- Anthony Burgess: One Hand Clapping (Ein-Hand-Klatschen, Stuttgart 1980, ISBN 3-12-900511-0)
- Aldo Scaglione: Komponierte Prosa von der Antike bis zur Gegenwart, 2 Bände, Stuttgart 1981
  - Vol. 1: The classical theory of composition - from its origins to the present (Die Theorie der Textkomposition in den klassischen und den westeuropäischen Sprachen, ISBN 3-12-936960-0)
  - Vol. 2: The theory of German word order from the Renaissance to the present (Die Theorie der Wortstellung im Deutschen, ISBN 3-12-936961-9)
- Alice Hoffman: The Drowning Season (Ertrinkenstage., Stuttgart 1981, ISBN 3-12-903830-2)
- Anthony Burgess: Napoleon Symphony (Napoleonsymphonie. in 4 Sätzen, Stuttgart 1982, ISBN 3-608-95079-6)
- Anthony Burgess: Earthly Powers (Der Fürst der Phantome., Stuttgart 1984, ISBN 3-608-95215-2)
- J. R. R. Tolkien: Good Dragons are Rare: Three Essays (Gute Drachen sind rar. 3 Aufsätze, Cottas Bibliothek der Moderne (30), Stuttgart 1984 (ISBN 3-608-95278-0)
- Anthony Burgess: The Doctor is Sick (Der Doktor ist defekt, Stuttgart 1985, ISBN 3-608-95026-5)
- J. R. R. Tolkien: Of Tuor and his Coming to Gondolin (Tuor und seine Ankunft in Gondolin. Erzählung, co-translator: Hans J. Schütz, Munich 1985 ISBN 3-423-10456-2)
- Anthony Burgess: Beard's Roman Women (Rom im Regen., Stuttgart 1987, ISBN 3-608-95024-9)
- J. R. R. Tolkien, Humphrey Carpenter (ed.): The Letters of J. R. R. Tolkien (Briefe, Stuttgart 1991, ISBN 3-608-95028-1)
- Annik Le Guérer: Les pouvoirs de l'odeur (Die Macht der Gerüche. Eine Philosophie der Nase, Stuttgart 1992, ISBN 3-608-93154-6)
- Bill Buford: Among the Thugs (Geil auf Gewalt. Unter Hooligans, Munich and Vienna 1992, ISBN 3-446-17160-6)
- Anthony Burgess: A Clockwork Orange (Die Uhrwerk-Orange., Stuttgart 1993, ISBN 3-608-95742-1)
- Shirley Jackson: The Haunting of Hill House (Spuk in Hill House., Zurich 1993 (ISBN 3-257-22605-5)
- Amélie Nothomb: Hygiène de l'assassin (Die Reinheit des Mörders., Zürich 1993, ISBN 3-257-06009-2)
- Joseph Conrad: The Nigger of the Narcissus (Der Bimbo von der „Narcissus“. Eine Geschichte von der See, Zurich 1994)
- Léon Werth: La maison blanche (Das weiße Zimmer, Cotta's Bibliothek der Moderne, Stuttgart 1994, ISBN 3-608-93204-6)
- Amélie Nothomb: Les Catilinaires (Der Professor., Zürich 1996, ISBN 3-257-06107-2)
- Keith Haring: Journals (Tagebücher, Frankfurt am Main 1997, ISBN 3-10-029911-6)
- J. R. R. Tolkien: The Hobbit or There and Back Again (Der Hobbit, Stuttgart 1998, ISBN 3-608-93805-2)
- Amélie Nothomb: Stupeur et tremblements (Mit Staunen und Zittern, Zurich 2000, ISBN 3-257-06250-8)
- J. R. R. Tolkien: The Lord of the Rings (Der Herr der Ringe, Stuttgart 2000, ISBN 3-608-93222-4)
- Amélie Nothomb: Mercure (Quecksilber., Zürich 2001, ISBN 3-257-06288-5)
- Amélie Nothomb: Métaphysique des tubes (Metaphysik der Röhren., Zurich 2002, ISBN 3-257-06299-0)
- Tom Shippey: J. R. R. Tolkien: Author of the Century (J. R. R. Tolkien. Autor des Jahrhunderts, Stuttgart 2002, ISBN 3-608-93432-4)
- Amélie Nothomb: Robert de noms propres (Im Namen des Lexikons., Zurich 2003, ISBN 3-257-06344-X)
