= Revolutionary Sonnets and Other Poems =

2002 posthumous collection of short poetry by Anthony Burgess

- First edition
- Editor: Kevin Jackson
- Author: Anthony Burgess
- Cover artist: Stephen Raw
- Language: English
- Genre: Poetry
- Publisher: Carcanet Press
- Publication date: 2002
- Publication place: United Kingdom
- Pages: 112
- ISBN: 1-85754-616-4
- OCLC: 907002817

Revolutionary Sonnets and Other Poems is a posthumous collection of the short poetry written by Anthony Burgess. Compiled and edited by Kevin Jackson, who also provided a short introduction to the text, the book purports to collect most if not all of the poems published under the names F. X. Enderby, John Burgess Wilson, or Anthony Burgess, as well as selections from longer verse works by Burgess.

Occasional annotations by Jackson accompany the text; additionally, those poems in Revolutionary Sonnets and Other Poems which were first published elsewhere are appropriately labelled with this information.

== Contents ==
The main body of the book is divided into four sections. The first section reproduces the full text of Burgess's shorter poetry, including the title "Five Revolutionary Sonnets" which were first published in The Transatlantic Review. Many of these poems, including the sonnets, were later attributed to the fictional F. X. Enderby, the protagonist of several novels by Burgess including Inside Mr. Enderby and its sequels. Additionally, some of the poems were previously printed in Little Wilson and Big God, a mostly autobiographical work, or in other literary journals.

The second section, labelled for longer poems, contains three relatively lengthy poems by Burgess: O Lord, O Ford, God Help Us, Also You; Verses for the Seventieth Birthday of Vladimir Nabokov; and Homage to Ogden Nash. Also included are "Five Excerpts from Moses."

In the third section, editor Kevin Jackson excerpts the notable verse translations of Burgess. Reproduced are a large fragment of Burgess's translation of Pervigilium Veneris, which was incorporated into the novella The Eve of Saint Venus. A selection of translated sonnets by Giuseppe Gioachino Belli, originally appearing in the novel Abba Abba, also appears, although many of the sonnets are omitted. The reason given for this in the book's introduction is that Abba Abba remained in print at time of publication. For this reason, excerpts from Byrne: A Novel are missing from Revolutionary Sonnets and Other Poems as well.

The final section samples Burgess's work in dramatic verse, opera libretti, and musical lyrics. Included are extracts from adaptations of Carmen by Georges Bizet, Oberon by Carl Maria von Weber, Oedipus the King by Sophocles, Chatsky by Alexander Griboyedov, and Cyrano de Bergerac by Edmond Rostand, as well as original works Blooms of Dublin, the unfinished Shakespearean musical Will!, Trotsky's in New York!, A Clockwork Orange: A Play with Music, and Mozart and the Wolf Gang.

== Reception ==
Literary critics released generally positive reviews for Revolutionary Sonnets and Other Poems. Andrew Biswell, writing for The Guardian, heaped high praise on both the editor's handling of footnotes and the author's choice subject matter, positively comparing the historical treatment of the Protestant Reformation in the "Five Revolutionary Sonnets" to the verses written by W. H. Auden on the Second Sino-Japanese War. However, Biswell noted with disappointment the absence of several verses from longer Burgess works, as well as the wholesale omission of "An Essay on Censorship."

In Quadrant magazine, Olivier Burckhardt largely echoed these sentiments, particularly the disappointment that Byrne: A Novel was not included. He identified the Belli translations as "Burgess at his best" and labelled the character of Enderby as an "archetype" of poetry.

Dan Chiasson's review in Poetry was considerably more mixed, characterizing the collection as "bizarre." In particular, he asserted that Burgess's poetry was only a minor part of his contribution to literature, and frankly stated that "the badness of this is simply incomprehensible." However, he did approve of Burgess's incorporation of his original poetry in the comic novels of the Enderby series, and acknowledged that the poems themselves had an audience. "If you and your friends sit around coming up with silly ideas for opera titles ('Mozart and the Whole Wolf Gang' [sic])," Chiasson opined, "this book is for you."
