= Beard's Roman Women =

1976 novel by Anthony Burgess

- First edition (US)
- Author: Anthony Burgess
- Language: English
- Genre: Novel
- Publisher: Hutchinson (UK); McGraw Hill (US)
- Publication date: Sep 1976 (US); Feb 1977 (UK)
- Publication place: United Kingdom
- Media type: Print (Hardback & Paperback)
- Pages: 155 pp (hardback edition)
- ISBN: 0-09-128400-7 (hardback edition)
- OCLC: 16364951

Beard's Roman Women is a 1976 novel by British novelist Anthony Burgess.

Dated "Montalbuccio-Monte Carlo-Eze-Callian, Summer 1975", according to Burgess it was written in the back of his Bedford Dormobile as he and his wife, Liana Burgess toured Europe and "partly in the bedroom of a small hotel run by Swiss homosexuals" (You've Had Your Time).

The novel is set in Rome and is apparently based on Burgess's experience of being widowed in the mid-1960s. Burgess's wife, Liana, is depicted as Paola Lucrezia Belli in the novel.

Photographs in the original edition were by David Robinson. In 2018, a new edition was published by Manchester University Press, restoring the photographs for the first time since the first edition. There is also a new introduction by Graham Foster, a fully annotated text, and several appendices of previously unpublished writing by Burgess.

== Plot ==
Ronald Beard, a screenwriter specialising in musicals, is grieving the death of his wife, Leonora, from cirrhosis of the liver. He is convinced by a Hollywood mogul to write a musical based on the life of Lord Byron, and Percy and Mary Shelley, so he makes the trip to Los Angeles to meet with the studio. There, he meets the photographer Paola Lucrezia Belli at a party and begins an affair, later following her to Rome.

In Rome, Beard gets down to work as Paola is called to Israel to take pictures of the Six Day War. While she is away, Beard is constantly interrupted by Gregory Gregson, a brash drunk who worked with Beard in the Colonial Service in Brunei, and mysterious phone calls from someone claiming to be Leonora. He also has to fend off Paola's ex-husband, the literary novelist Pathan, who lays claim to the contents of Paola's apartment.

Eventually, Beard, suffering from an unnamed, and terminal, tropical disease, settles down with Leonora's sister in England. He returns to Rome a final time to die, though his body refuses to give up.

== Background ==
Beard's Roman Women is loosely based on Burgess's own experiences following the death of his first wife, Lynne, and his subsequent meeting with his second wife, Liana. It was originally titled Rome in the Rain, but changed by the American publisher, McGraw-Hill. It is still called Rome in the Rain in many translations. The plot of the novel is loosely based on the Orpheus myth, including elements of Jean Cocteau's version Orphee.

The film script for the musical about Byron and Shelley is inspired by a television script Burgess wrote for BBC Two in 1964 titled 'By the Waters of Leman: Byron and Shelley at Geneva'. In reality, Burgess was commissioned to write a musical based on the life of Shakespeare by producer William Conrad. The cantata St Celia’s Day, also described in the novel, surfaced two years later as a real Burgess composition.

== Characters ==
- Ronald Beard
- Paola Lucrezia Belli – an Italian photographer
- Greg Gregson – old Friend of Ronald Beard
- Leonora Beard – deceased wife of Ronald Beard
- P.R. Pathan – famous writer and husband of Paola Lucrezia Belli
- Byron – the poet
- Shelley – the writer
