= Devil of a State =

Book by Anthony Burgess

America's Hit
- First edition cover
- Author: Anthony Burgess
- Language: English
- Genre: Colonial literature
- Publisher: Heinemann
- Publication date: 1961
- Publication place: United States
- Media type: Print (Hardback & Paperback)

Ballantine paperback edition

Devil of a State is a 1961 novel by Anthony Burgess based on his experience living and working in Bandar Seri Begawan, the capital of the Southeast Asian sultanate of Brunei, on the island of Borneo, in 1958–59.

It is the fourth of what have been called Burgess's "exotic novels", the others being Time for a Tiger, The Enemy in the Blanket and Beds in the East.

To avoid any risk of a libel suit the action was set in an imaginary caliphate, "Dunia", the location was moved to East Africa, and a UN representative was substituted for the British adviser. In the first volume of his autobiography, Little Wilson and Big God, Being the First Part of the Confessions of Anthony Burgess (1987), Burgess wrote:

This novel was, is, about Brunei, which was renamed Naraka, Malayo-Arabic for hell. Little invention was needed to contrive a large cast of unbelievable characters and a number of interwoven plots. Though completed in 1958, the work was not published until 1961, for what it was worth it was made a choice of the book society. Heinemann, my publisher, was doubtful about publishing it: it might be libelous. I had to change the setting from Borneo to an East African one. Heinemann was right to be timorous. In early 1958 'The Enemy in the Blanket' appeared and this at once provoked a libel suit.

== Characters and plot ==
The Italians Nando and Paolo Tasca, father and son, are working on the marble in the grandiose mosque that is under construction (this was in fact the Sultan Omar Ali Saifuddin Mosque, designed by an Italian architect and built while Burgess was in Brunei).

After a furious argument with his violent father over a purloined pocket watch, Paolo seeks refuge in one of the mosque's minarets. When political oppositionists learn of Paolo's act, they exalt him as a hero in the struggle against colonial oppression and he becomes a household name in enlightened circles around the world. But how will they get him to come down?
