= The Doctor Is Sick =

1960 novel by Anthony Burgess

- First UK edition
- Author: Anthony Burgess
- Language: English
- Genre: Comic novel
- Publisher: Heinemann (UK); W. W. Norton (US)
- Publication date: 1960
- Publication place: United Kingdom
- Media type: Print
- Pages: 261 pages

The Doctor Is Sick is a 1960 novel by Anthony Burgess.

According to his autobiography, Burgess composed the book in just six weeks. He wrote it after his return to England from Brunei in a burst of literary activity that also produced Devil of a State, A Clockwork Orange, The Right to an Answer and several other works.

== Plot introduction ==
The doctor of the title is Edwin Spindrift, PhD, an unhappily married professor of linguistics who has been sent home from Burma to England suffering from a mysterious brain ailment. While Edwin is confined to a neurological ward, undergoing a battery of diagnostic tests, Mrs Spindrift amuses herself with some disreputable new friends at nearby pubs. Sometimes, to Edwin's distress, she sends these friends to keep her husband company during visiting hours, rather than come herself. Most of the novel is a dream sequence: while he is anaesthetised for brain surgery, Edwin's anxiety over his wife and the company she keeps turns into a fantasy in which Edwin leaves the hospital and encounters his wife's friends, with whom he has various adventures.

== Background and sources ==
Shortly before he wrote The Doctor Is Sick Burgess suffered an obscure mental breakdown that ended his career as a teacher in the Far East. He came back to Britain convinced that he had a brain tumour. He based some of the events in this novel on his experience of confinement in the Neurological Institute in London.

The character Doctor Railton, who is put in charge of Edwin's case, is a fictionalised version of Sir Roger Bannister, who performed neurological tests on Burgess.
