= Language Made Plain =

1964 book by Anthony Burgess

- First edition
- Author: Anthony Burgess
- Language: English
- Subject: linguistics
- Publisher: English Universities Press
- Publication date: 1964
- Publication place: United Kingdom
- Media type: hardcover
- Pages: 196
- ISBN: 0-340-04770-4

Language Made Plain by Anthony Burgess is a brief overview of the field of linguistics.

== Contents of Book ==
Without dealing specifically with any one language, it provides an introduction to semantics, phonetics, and the development of language.

== Later Book ==
Burgess later incorporated most of Language Made Plain into the first half of the book A Mouthful of Air.
