= M/F =

1971 novel by Anthony Burgess

- First edition
- Author: Anthony Burgess
- Language: English
- Genre: Comedy novel
- Publisher: Jonathan Cape
- Publication date: 1971
- Media type: Print (hardback and paperback)
- Pages: 214 pp
- ISBN: 0-14-118780-8
- OCLC: 56649861

M/F is a 1971 novel by the English author Anthony Burgess. It was first published as MF by Jonathan Cape and Alfred A. Knopf; though M/F first appeared on the spine of Knopf's dust jacket. Burgess has called the novel a personal favourite of all his writings.

== Plot ==
From the blurb of Cape's first edition: 'The situation as far as I'm concerned,' says the young-narrator-hero of MF, 'is an interesting one. In two days in a strange country I've acquired a mother in the form of a Welsh-speaking Bird Queen who scares me. I've spent some hours in prison, I've discovered the works of an unknown superlative artist in a garden shed and I've been shot at by a riddling lion-faced expert on Bishop Berkeley. Most interesting of all I'm due tonight to be married by a circus clown to my own sister.' Almost twenty-one, a college throw-out, Miles Faber embarks on a defiant pilgrimage across the Caribbean. His destination: the shrine of Sib Legeru, Castitian poet and painter. In the streets of Castita's capital, gay with a religious festival, a series of bizarre revelations await him: his obscene double, the son of a circus sorceress Aderyn the Bird Queen, and a sister-plump fellow offspring of his father's incestuous union. Unspeakable crimes of blood and lust are perpetrated against both before Miles, solving the final riddle, wakes-like Oedipus to find himself a willing victim of the machinations of dynastic destiny.

== Inspiration ==
Burgess in his memoir You've Had Your Time gives two sources of inspiration for the novel. The first was a facetious remark made by William Conrad, about "putting on a black Oedipus and calling it Mother-Fucker."

The second source of inspiration was The Scope of Anthropology by Claude Lévi-Strauss. Burgess in his memoir recounts the Algonquin myth in which "a boy finds his sister being sexually assaulted by his own double. He kills the double, only to discover that he was the son of a very powerful witch who has taught owls to talk. She looks for her lost son, now buried, and the brother has to pretend to be that son. The witch has her suspicions, which can be allayed only by the boy's marrying his own sister: no one would be so mad as to fracture the incest taboo. But even after the marriage the witch is not quite convinced, so she sets her talking owls to ask the pseudo-son riddles: if he gives the right answers, as Oedipus did to the Sphinx, she will know that he has committed the unpardonable sin and hence is not her son. The brother and sister escape when he unwittingly answers the riddles correctly, and they fly into the heavens, there to become the sun and moon in eclipse.... What I saw in the legend was the possibility of composing a contemporary realistic novel in which all the structural desiderata were fulfilled without the uninstructed reader's needing to know or care."

== Reception ==
Because both MF and The Scope of Anthropology were published by Jonathan Cape in Great Britain, "facetious critics were to see a kind of incest in the fact of a mother-discourse and a son-novel lying in the bed of a common publisher."

Burgess in his memoir quotes Frank Kermode, who in The Listener, showed that he had read his Lévi-Strauss and saw that the novel was perhaps not fully intelligible without a knowledge of the riddle-incest nexus. 'What ... is one to make of it? It is a puzzle and on its own terms forbids solutions. But Burgess is rather movingly putting to use the self-begotten system of his own imagination and language to protest against spurious disorder in art and life. This is too solemn an account of a book so bewilderingly funny ... Its fertility is fantastic, and so is its ingenuity ... Perhaps all one ought to do is to characterise the book as a riddling Sphinx, and abstain from guessing further, but it should be added that it is a work of astonishing narrative and intellectual energy, and that everybody who thinks the English novel lacking in those qualities should read it, twice. Anthony has earned his place among the birds.'

Time Magazine called the MF, the biggest send-up of them all, on Claude Lévi-Strauss's intellectually fashionable structural anthropology.
