= Liana Burgess =

Italian translator and literary agent

Liana Burgess (born Liliana Macellari, September 25, 1929 – December 3, 2007) was an Italian translator and literary agent who was the second wife of English writer Anthony Burgess. Burgess and Macellari had embarked on an affair while Burgess was married to his first wife, and Macellari gave birth to a son nine months after their meeting. The couple became tax exiles in the late 1960s, living in Malta and Italy, and spent several years in the United States. They finally settled in Monaco. Macellari played an important role in Burgess's later literary career, negotiating film rights and acting as his European literary agent, and translating his novels.

== Academic life ==
Macellari was born in Porto Civitanova, Italy, in 1929. Her mother was an amateur poet and artist, Contessa Maria Lucrezia Pasi della Pergola, and her father was Gilberto Macellari, a photographer and actor. Her father died in the Second World War. Macellari had a sister who was later killed in a mountaineering accident. Macellari learnt the English language by reading the novelist Henry James.

Macellari studied at the University of Bologna and the University of Paris and was the recipient of a Fulbright Fellowship which enabled her to study literature in South Hadley, Massachusetts in the United States, at Mount Holyoke College. Shortly after her move to America, Macellari met and married Benjamin Johnson, an African-American translator of Italo Svevo. Shortly after their marriage the couple separated and were finally divorced in 1967.

After moving to Rome in the late 1950s Macellari founded a theatre company and after having an affair with Englishman Roy Halliday, moved to London with him. Halliday later drowned when sailing in the Atlantic Ocean.

It was while in Rome that Macellari started her Italian-language translation of Lawrence Durrell's fiction tetralogy The Alexandria Quartet. Macellari also translated James Joyce's Finnegans Wake.

== Life with Burgess ==
In 1963 Macellari was tasked with creating a report on new English fiction for the Bompiani Literary Almanac, and in the course of her research, enthusiastically wrote to the authors of the novels A Clockwork Orange and Inside Mr. Enderby. Burgess was the author of both novels, having published Inside Mr. Enderby with the pseudonym of Joseph Kell. Macellari and Burgess met for lunch and began an affair, although Burgess was already married. Burgess was unhappily married to Llewela (Lynne) Isherwood Jones, who suffered from alcoholism, and Burgess apparently refused to leave her due to the offence he felt would be caused to George Dwyer, the Roman Catholic Bishop of Leeds, who was his cousin.

In 1964 Macellari's son, Paolo Andrea, was born. Her former partner, Roy Halliday, was named on the birth certificate as Paolo Andrea's father, and Burgess would later describe him shortly before his 1968 marriage to Macellari as his step-son. Burgess would also later be described as Paolo Andrea's father. Paolo Andrea died in 2002. Burgess's wife died in March 1968, and the couple married not long after. Macellari then ended her academic career at the University of Cambridge. Macellari had joined King's College, Cambridge to teach applied linguistics in 1967, and had made Italian-language translations of Thomas Pynchon's novels V. and The Crying of Lot 49.

Macellari played an important role in the development of Burgess's literary career, being depicted as a fictional Italian photographer, Paola Lucrezia Belli, in his 1976 autobiographical novel Beard's Roman Women, and worked as his European literary agent from 1975. Her translation of his Malayan Trilogy received the Premio Scanno prize, and she also translated the sonnets of Giuseppe Gioachino Belli that were featured in his 1977 novel Abba Abba. She also sued the producers of the film adaptation of A Clockwork Orange, winning a 10% share of the film's profits which were worth more than $1 million.

The couple left the United Kingdom in 1968 as a result of the income tax demands that Burgess now faced as a high earning writer, and travelled Europe in a Bedford Dormobile, with Burgess writing in the back of the vehicle while Liana drove. The couple next settled on the island of Malta, which they then left for a four-year tour of universities in the United States. While touring America she worked on her translation of Joyce's Finnegans Wake, retitled pHorbiCEtta by her.

The Burgesses ultimately departed Malta in the aftermath of a lecture he had delivered that was poorly received by an audience of Catholic priests, and settled in Italy on the shore of Lake Bracciano, near Rome. The couple had experienced further problems with income tax following their move to Italy, having found difficulties in transferring money to Italy from the United Kingdom without incurring taxation in both countries.

The couple settled in Monaco in 1974, moving to a large apartment at 44 Rue Grimaldi. The couple had decided to settle in the tax haven of Monaco as the country did not levy income tax and additionally, widows were exempt from death duties, a form of taxation on their husband's estates. The couple's move to Monaco accorded with her conviction that an author's earnings should be exempt from taxation.

At the time of his death from lung cancer in 1993, Burgess was worth $3 million and owned 11 properties across Europe. The proceeds of these assets enabled Macellari to further the study and promotion of Burgess's work, and to fund the creation of the University of Angers's Anthony Burgess Centre and Manchester's International Anthony Burgess Foundation. She also donated £200,000 to Liverpool Hope University to promote the study of her husband's work. In his obituary of Liana Macellari for The Guardian, Christopher Hawtree wrote that "Perhaps she fretted unduly about his posthumous reputation, but certainly without her, his best work might not have found its lucrative place among the most exhilarating postwar writing."
