= A Mouthful of Air =

A Mouthful of Air may refer to:

- A Mouthful of Air (film), a 2021 American psychological drama film
- A Mouthful of Air (book), a 1992 book on linguistics by Anthony Burgess
