= A Dead Man in Deptford =

1993 historical novel by Anthony Burgess

- First edition
- Author: Anthony Burgess
- Cover artist: top: "London from Southwark" (c. 1630 Dutch School) bottom: Anonymous portrait 1585, believed to show Christopher Marlowe
- Language: English
- Genre: Historical fiction
- Publisher: Hutchinson
- Publication date: 6 May 1993
- Publication place: United Kingdom
- Media type: Print (hardcover & paperback)
- Pages: 288 (hardcover)
- ISBN: 0-09-177977-4
- OCLC: 32241420
- Dewey Decimal: 823/.914 20
- LC Class: PR6052.U638 D42 1995

A Dead Man in Deptford is a 1993 novel by Anthony Burgess, the last to be published during his life. It depicts the life and character of Christopher Marlowe, a renowned playwright of the Elizabethan era.

== Plot ==
Reckless but brilliant Cambridge scholar Christopher "Kit" Marlowe is conscripted by Francis Walsingham to be a spy for Queen Elizabeth. Kit and Walsingham's young cousin Thomas experience love at first sight. Kit is soon sent to the English college at Rheims to ferret out recusants conspiring against the Queen and her Church of England. Walsingham and his agents discover a conspiracy, later known as the Babington Plot, to assassinate Elizabeth I. They use this discovery as a means to effect the execution of Elizabeth's rival, Mary, Queen of Scots. Kit is instrumental in the arrest of the conspirators, but horrified by their execution. Marlowe is portrayed as a secretive, solitary and eventually isolated person. Burgess explores his sexual addiction and passion for the theatre.

== Adaptation ==
A feature film adaptation was announced in September 2010, starring Sam Riley as Kit and costarring James Purefoy, Ray Winstone, Ed Speleers, and Adam Sinclair in undisclosed roles. The screenplay was written by Michael Elias, and Nick Copus was set to direct.
