= Kevin Jackson (writer) =

English writer (1955–2021)

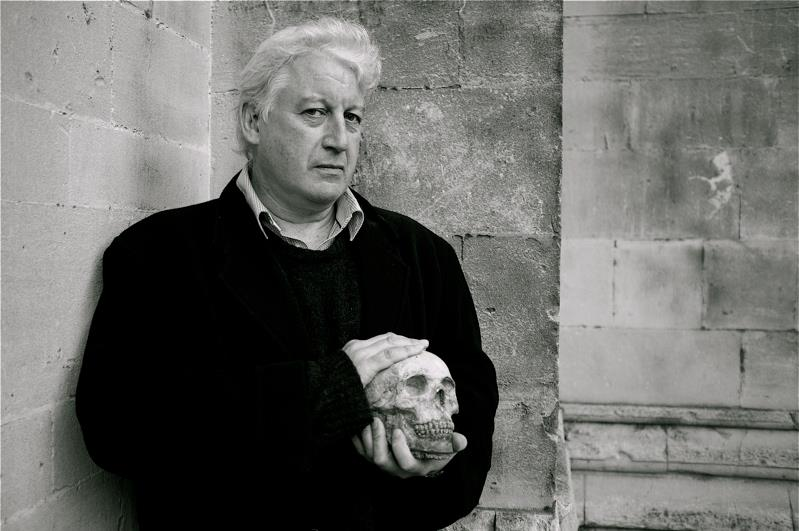
- Jackson photographed by Marzena Pogorzaly, 2012
- Born: 3 January 1955; London, England
- Died: 10 May 2021 (aged 66); Cambridge, England
- Occupation: Writer
- Spouse: Claire Preston (m. 2004)
- Writing career
- Period: 1979–2021
- Genres: Criticism, biography, cultural history
- Notable works: The Language of Cinema (1998); Humphrey Jennings (2004); Withnail & I (BFI Modern Classics) (2008); Invisible Forms: A Guide to Literary Curiosities (2000)

Kevin Alec Jackson (3 January 1955 – 10 May 2021) was an English writer, broadcaster, filmmaker and pataphysician.

== Background ==
Kevin Alec Jackson was born in Balham, London, on 3 January 1955, to Alec and Alma (née Rolfe) Jackson, of Clapham. He was educated at the Emanuel School, Battersea, and Pembroke College, Cambridge.

== Career ==
After teaching in the English Department of Vanderbilt University, Nashville, Tennessee, US, he returned to the United Kingdom and joined the BBC, first as a producer in radio and then as a director of short documentaries for television. In 1987, he was recruited to the Arts pages of The Independent. He was a freelance writer from the early 1990s and was a regular contributor to BBC radio programmes, including Radio 4's Saturday Review.

Jackson often collaborated on projects with, among others, the filmmaker Kevin Macdonald, with whom he co-produced a Channel 4 documentary on Humphrey Jennings, The Man Who Listened to Britain (2000); with the cartoonist Hunt Emerson, on comic strips about the history of Western occultism for Fortean Times, on two comics inspired by John Ruskin (published by the Ruskin Foundation) and on a book-length version of Dante's Inferno (Knockabout Books, 2012); with the musician and composer Colin Minchin (lyrics for various songs, and the rock opera Bite, first staged in West London, October 2011); and with the songwriter Peter Blegvad (short surreal plays for BBC Radio 3 – eartoons). Jackson also conducted a long biographical interview with Blegvad, published in September 2011 by Atlas Press as The Bleaching Stream. Jackson appears, under his own name, as a semi-fictional character in Iain Sinclair's account of a pedestrian journey around the M25, London Orbital. Worple Press published Jackson's book of interviews with Sinclair, The Verbals in 2002.

He was among the founder members of the London Institute of 'Pataphysics, and held the Ordre de la Grande Gidouille from the College de Pataphysique in Paris. He was also a Fellow of the Royal Society of Arts and a Companion of the Guild of St George. From 2009–2011 he was visiting professor in English at University College London.

== Personal life and death ==
In 2004, Jackson married American academic Claire Preston, a fellow at Sidney Sussex College, Cambridge. They lived in Linton, Cambridgeshire. Jackson died from heart failure at Addenbrooke's Hospital in Cambridge on 10 May 2021, at the age of 66.

== Select bibliography ==
=== As author ===
- The Language of Cinema, published by Routledge Press 1998 (ISBN 978-1857542325)
- Invisible Forms: A Guide to Literary Curiosities, published by St Martin's Press 2000 (ISBN 978-0330371155)
- Building the Great Pyramid, Published by Firefly Books 2003 (ISBN 978-1552977217)
- Letters of Introduction, Published by Carcanet Press Ltd 2004 (ISBN 978-1857546552)
- Humphrey Jennings, Published by Picador Press 2004 (ISBN 978-0330354387)
- A Ruskin Alphabet, Published by Worple Press 2000 (ISBN 978-0953094721)
- Withnail & I (BFI Modern Classics), 2008 (ISBN 978-1844570355)
- Lawrence of Arabia (BFI Modern Classics), 2007 (ISBN 978-1844571789)
- Fast, 2006 (ISBN 978-1846270291)
- Moose, Published by Reaktion Books 2009 (ISBN 978-1861893963)
- Bite: A Vampire Handbook, Published by Portobello Books Ltd 2010 (ISBN 978-1846272110)
- The Pataphysical Flook, 2007 (ISBN 1-900565-33-1)
- The Worlds of John Ruskin, Published by Pallas Athene Arts 2009 (ISBN 978-1843680444)
- Chronicles of Old London, Published by Museyon Guides 2012 (ISBN 978-0984633432)
- Constellation of Genius, Published by Hutchinson Press 2012 (ISBN 978-0091930974)
- Nosferatu (1922): eine Symphonie des Grauens (BFI Film Classics), published by British Film Institute 2013 (ISBN 978-1844576500)
- Carnal, published by Pallas Athene Arts 2015 (ISBN 978-1843681113)
- Mayflower: The Voyage from Hell published by TSB | Can of Worms, 2020 (ISBN 9781916190870)
- Darwin’s Odyssey: The Voyage of the Beagle published by TSB | Can of Worms, 2020 (ISBN 9781916190887)
- The Queen’s Pirate: Sir Francis Drake and the Golden Hind published by TSB | Can of Worms, 2019 (ISBN 9781916190894)
- Nelson’s Victory: Trafalgar and Tragedy published by TSB | Can of Worms, 2021 (ISBN 9781911673064)

=== As editor ===
- Schrader on Schrader, 2004 (ISBN 978-0571221769)
- The Humphrey Jennings Film Reader, Published by Carcanet Press 2005 (ISBN 978-1857540451)
- The Oxford Book of Money, 1995 (ISBN 978-0192142009)
- The Risk of Being Alive. Dylan Francis (ISBN 0-904274-02-0)
- The Anatomy of Melancholy. (Robert Burton), 2004 (ISBN 978-1857546507)
- Revolutionary Sonnets and Other Poems (Anthony Burgess), 2003 (ISBN 978-1857546163)
- The Book of Hours, 2007 (ISBN 978-0715636084)
- Aussie Dans Le Metro: A Festschrift for John Baxter (privately published: Alces Press, 2009),

=== As co-editor ===
- Pataphysics: Definitions and Citations. (with Alastair Brotchie, Stanley Chapman and Thieri Foulc), 2003 (ISBN 1-900565-08-0)

== Filmography ==
=== Shorts ===
- Bite: Diary of a Vampire Housewife, 2009
- Bite: Pavane for a Vampire Queen, 2011
- No More a-Roving (Vampire Mix), 2011
- Exquisite Corpse (from the novel by Robert Irwin), 2011
- The Last of the Vostyachs (from the novel by Diego Marani), 2012
- Constellation of Genius, 2012
- Dracbeth, 2014
- Carnal to the Point of Scandal, 2015
