= Anthony Burgess: A Life =

- Author: Roger Lewis
- Subject: Anthony Burgess
- Genre: Biography
- Publisher: Faber & Faber
- Publication date: 2002
- ISBN: 9780571204922

Anthony Burgess: A Life is the title of a biography of the novelist and critic Anthony Burgess (1917–93) by Roger Lewis.

Blake Morrison, in his review in The Guardian, describes the book as "an idle, fatuous, self-regarding book".
