= Tremor of Intent: An Eschatological Spy Novel =

1966 novel by Anthony Burgess

- First edition (publ. Heinemann)
- Author: Anthony Burgess
- Language: English
- Genre: Spy novel
- Publication date: 1966
- Publication place: United Kingdom
- Media type: Print
- Pages: 256

Tremor of Intent: An Eschatological Spy Novel (1966), by Anthony Burgess, is an English espionage novel.

Burgess conceived it as a reaction both to the heavy-handed and humourless spy fiction of John le Carré, and to Ian Fleming's James Bond, a character Burgess thought an imperialist relic. The subtitle "An Eschatological Spy Novel" refers to Burgess's idea of the Cold War as a hostile symbiosis, an "ultimate conflict" for which Good and Evil are inadequate terms. In Burgess's view the Soviet bloc and the West formed a yin and yang-type duoverse. In You've Had Your Time, the second volume of his autobiography, he confesses that the title of the novel occurred to him one hungover morning when his hand began shaking and his wife said, "That is tremor of intent."

The novel has confused some readers and critics because it straddles the dichotomies between serious fiction and comic fiction, and between popular genre storytelling and metaphysical philosophy. It's also an example of one of Burgess's experiments in combining musical forms with literature: its structure is based on sonata form.

The subtitle "An Eschatological Spy Novel" appears on the dust cover of the first American edition, but does not appear on the title page of the novel. The British first edition, published by William Heinemann, does not include the subtitle on the dust cover or the title page. The uncorrected proofs of the novel state where and when the novel was written: "Etchingham, June 20 – August 30, 1965."

Anthony Burgess later wrote a screenplay for the James Bond film The Spy Who Loved Me (1977) featuring characters from the novel, but it was rejected in favor of Richard Maibaum's script.

== Plot summary ==
The amoral Agent Hillier of MI6 journeys to the city of Yarylyuk aboard the passenger ship Polyolbion, on a mission to infiltrate a conference of Soviet scientists and return to the United Kingdom with his childhood friend Roper, who has defected to the Soviet Union. En route Hillier meets the sexually precocious sixteen-year-old Clara, the voluptuous femme fatale Miss Devi and the shadowy tycoon Theodorescu.
