= Nothing Like the Sun: A Story of Shakespeare's Love Life =

1964 fictional biography of William Shakespeare by Anthony Burgess

Nothing Like the Sun
- First edition (Heinemann)
- Author: Anthony Burgess
- Language: English
- Publication date: 1964

Nothing Like the Sun is a fictional biography of William Shakespeare by Anthony Burgess first published in 1964. It tells the story of Shakespeare's life with a mixture of fact and fiction, the latter including an affair with a black prostitute named Fatimah, who inspires the Dark Lady of the Sonnets. The title refers to the first line of Sonnet 130, "My mistress' eyes are nothing like the sun", in which Shakespeare describes his love for a dark-haired woman.

== Background ==
Burgess recounted in his Foreword added to later editions that the novel was a project of his for many years, but the process of writing accelerated so that publishing would coincide with the quartercentenary of Shakespeare's birth, on 23 April 1964.

== Synopsis ==
As Burgess reminds readers in his foreword, the novel has a frame story in which a professor of a Malaysian college named "Mr. Burgess" is delivering his final lecture on the life of Shakespeare before returning to the United Kingdom, while progressively becoming more drunk on rice wine and gradually less inhibited as the lecture progresses.The "lecture" begins with "Mr. Burgess" reading Sonnet 147, in which Shakespeare describes his love for his mistress as a fever. "Mr. Burgess" proposes that this is proof of Shakespeare contracting syphilis, and that Dark Lady's name is spelled in acrostic in the poem, the letters F T M H being a latinization of the Arabic name "Fatimah", meaning "destiny".

The main narrative then tells the story of Shakespeare's life, up to the writing of the Sonnets. It portrays his affair with Fatimah, a black sex worker, from whom he contracts syphilis and is driven mad by pain and fever. It also includes a plot of Shakespeare becoming cuckolded by his younger brother Richard, who had stayed in Stratford, a thesis Burgess first encountered in literature in the Scylla and Charybdis episode of James Joyce's Ulysses. The style of the novel owes something to both Elizabethan English and Joycean wordplay.

== Reception ==
Harold Bloom referred to the book as "Joycean fiction about Shakespeare", and called it "Burgess's best novel".

== Editions ==
- Burgess, Anthony (1992). Nothing Like The Sun. London: Vintage. ISBN 0-09-941690-5.
- Burgess, Anthony (2013). Nothing Like The Sun. New York: W. W. Norton & Company. ISBN 978-0-393-34640-4.
