= Oberon Old and New =

1985 book containing a new libretto written by Anthony Burgess

- First edition
- Author: Anthony Burgess
- Language: English
- Genre: libretto
- Publisher: Hutchinson
- Publication date: 24 October 1985
- Media type: Print
- Pages: 96
- ISBN: 0-09-163521-7
- OCLC: 14212873
- Dewey Decimal: 782.1/2 19
- LC Class: ML50.W363 O3 1985

Oberon Old and New or Oberon Past and Present is a book containing a new libretto written by Anthony Burgess in 1985 for Carl Maria von Weber's last opera Oberon (1826). The libretto was commissioned by Scottish Opera, and first used in Glasgow on 23 October 1985, in a performance conducted by Sir Alexander Gibson and directed by Graham Vick, with production design by Russell Craig.

Although the composer was German, the original libretto by James Robinson Planché is also in English, and included in the book. Complaints about Planché's libretto have been common over the years, with Donald Tovey going so far as to call it a "pig-trough"; in performance it has usually been replaced with the German version by Theodor Hell.

In August 2004, Scottish Opera staged several of Weber's operas, including Oberon (on 18 August), shortly before disbanding its chorus in order to meet budget cuts. However, Burgess's libretto was not used. One critic observed that:

Scottish Opera has not volunteered to revive its 1985 production of Oberon at Edinburgh. This version was commissioned from the novelist Anthony Burgess, who not only replaced the archaic expressions and ersatz Shakespeare of Planché's original, but also updated the story to involve hijackers and hostages in a futuristic Middle East. A staging that parked an aeroplane on the roof of Glasgow's Theatre Royal on the opening night only seemed to sink the already preposterous plot further into the mire, although Burgess was so taken with the music that he went on to arrange the overture to Oberon for guitar quartet. A year later, Frank Dunlop, in the third of the Edinburgh Festivals he directed, created an imaginative semi-staging of the opera on a tilting disc erected on the platform of the Usher Hall.

== Bibliography ==
- Alan Fischler. "Oberon and Odium: The Career and Crucifixion of J. R. Planché." The Opera Quarterly 1995 12(1):5-26; doi:10.1093/oq/12.1.5
