= Sinfoni Melayu =

Symphony composed by Anthony Burgess

Sinfoni Melayu (or Sinfoni Malaya) is mentioned in the reference work Contemporary Composers as a symphony composed by Anthony Burgess in 1956, when he was a teacher at Malay College Kuala Kangsar. In his book This Man and Music Burgess himself wrote:

Sinfoni Melayu, a three-movement symphony which tried to combine the musical elements of the country into a synthetic language which called on native drums and xylophones as well as instruments of the full Western orchestra. The last movement ended with a noble professional theme, rather Elgarian, representing independence. Then, over a drum roll and before the final chord in C major, the audience was to rise and shout "Merdeka!"

In his Anthony Burgess Newsletter in 1999 Paul Phillips called "Sinfoni Malaya for orchestra and brass band” Burgess's second symphony, following Symphony No. 1, composed in 1935).

The score of the symphony appears to have been lost, and there is no evidence that it was ever performed, so the only source for its existence is Burgess’s own testimony.
