= One Hand Clapping (novel) =

1961 novel by Anthony Burgess

- First UK edition
- Author: Anthony Burgess (as Joseph Kell)
- Cover artist: Charles Gorham (UK edition)
- Language: English
- Publisher: Alfred A. Knopf (US); Peter Davies (UK)
- Publication date: 1961
- Publication place: United States
- Media type: Print
- Pages: 214 pp

One Hand Clapping is a 1961 work by Anthony Burgess published originally under the pseudonym Joseph Kell in the UK.

The novel was intended as an indictment of what Burgess saw as the degradation of contemporary Western education and culture.

Burgess deliberately toned down his trademark love of vocabulary for the novel, which among other things lampoons the British television host Hughie Green. The entire vocabulary in One Hand Clapping amounts to approximately 800 words.

== Title ==
The line, "Two hands clap and there is a sound; what is the sound of one hand?" is a traditional Zen koan, and the novel takes its title from this. Burgess explained the title as follows: "The clasped hands of marriage have been reduced [by the novel's end] to a single hand. Yet it claps."

The phrase "one hand clapping", if translated literally into Malay, means "Bertepuk sebelah tangan", which usually means unrequited love when used in context of a relationship or romantic feelings. The English saying "It takes two to tango" has a similar connotation.

Another novel by Anthony Burgess, The Enemy in The Blanket, also has a title that is a translation of a Malay proverb ("Musuh Dalam Selimut").

== Plot ==
Howard Shirley has a photographic memory. He uses his talent to enter, and win, a mega-money TV quiz show.

He then discloses another gift: he is clairvoyant and can predict racing results. He gambles his winnings on race horses and the couple become extremely wealthy and travel the world, staying in luxury hotels.

On their return, however, Howard, disgusted by the corruption of the world they have seen - and troubled by prophetic glimpses of a coming decline in civilisation - declares that they must commit suicide together by barbiturates.

Janet resists, killing Howard with a coal hammer. Janet flees with the remainder of their money, to begin a new life abroad, taking her husband with her in a chest.

== Characters ==
Janet Shirley - The narrator and point of view through which the reader sees the novel. She introduces herself as "Janet Shirley, née Barnes ... just gone twenty-three." Burgess portrays her voice using a spartan vocabulary.

Howard Shirley - Aged 27 and the husband of Janet. At the novel's opening, he is working at a used car dealership. He is an average man living an average life in Britain.
