= The End of the World News: An Entertainment =

1982 novel by Anthony Burgess

- First edition
- Author: Anthony Burgess
- Language: English
- Genre: Historical fiction novel
- Publisher: Hutchinson & Co.
- Publication date: 1982
- Publication place: United Kingdom
- Media type: Print (Hardcover
- Pages: 388 (paperback edition)
- ISBN: 0091505402 (first edition, hardback)
- OCLC: 8762838

The End of the World News is a 1982 novel by British author Anthony Burgess.

Presented without chapter breaks, the novel weaves together three stories:

1. A visit of Leon Trotsky to New York City in 1917 shortly before the Russian Revolution. The story is written as the libretto of a Broadway musical.
2. A brief biography of Sigmund Freud based on fictionalised dialogues with his family, and his psychiatry and psychoanalysis contemporaries (e.g. Theodor Meynert, Havelock Ellis, Ernest Jones, Carl Jung, Alfred Adler and Otto Rank). The biography is a non-chronological narrative, beginning with his emigration from Vienna shortly before World War II.
3. A fantastic tale, set in the future, of the end of the world caused by an extrasolar planet, named Lynx, colliding with the Earth.

The novel is presented as a chronicle told to children in the far future.

== Stories ==
=== Sigmund Freud ===
Freud is living in Vienna with his family. His home is raided by youths of the Nazi Sturmabteilung looking for books to burn and to steal money from rich Jews. Freud’s friend Dr. Jones arrives and persuades him to leave anti-semitic Vienna and move to England. Freud is a sick man (from cancer of the jaw ) and his speech is distorted by the prosthesis in his mouth. His daughter Anna is taken away to be questioned but returns later. Before leaving Vienna, Freud must obtain a Unbedenklichkeitserklärung and sign a declaration that he has been well treated by the German authorities and the Gestapo. The family catches an evening train to France. On the train, Freud remembers incidents from his life...

Freud remembers early discussions about hypnosis and his discovery that neuroses need have no somatic aetiology. He remembers the beneficial effects (to him) of cocaine, which he gives to Fleischl who dies of an overdose. Breuer criticises Freud for assuming “what’s true for you must be true for others”. Freud remembers a disagreement with Meynert and another with Krafft-Ebing. Freud remembers going to see Oedipus Rex at the theatre. He is convinced the story has profound implications and “must write something about it”.

Freud remembers consultations with various patients. He remembers a session with a woman depressed and suicidal, which Freud attributes to her feelings of guilt about desiring more sex. Freud later encounters the woman’s husband who strikes Freud for “trying to turn my wife into a whore”. Freud remembers a vacation in the Alps where he treats a girl who has been crying hysterically. He diagnoses that she feels guilty about a long-suppressed wish to kill her mother. Martha interjects that if the girl only imagined killing her mother, perhaps she imagined the sexual incident with her father too? Freud is panicked at the possibility his theories could be wrong. Freud receives a telegram that his father has died. He feels guilty about his father’s death, his own neurosis. Freud sees a patient sent to him by Professor Nothnagel even though Nothnagel doesn’t believe in Freud’s approach. Freud's treatment is unsuccessful because the patient will not free associate. Freud accuses Nothnagel of sending him the patient only in order to demonstrate the futility of his (Freud’s) methods. Later, he meets Nothnagel again who dismisses Freud’s work as "a lot of trickery".

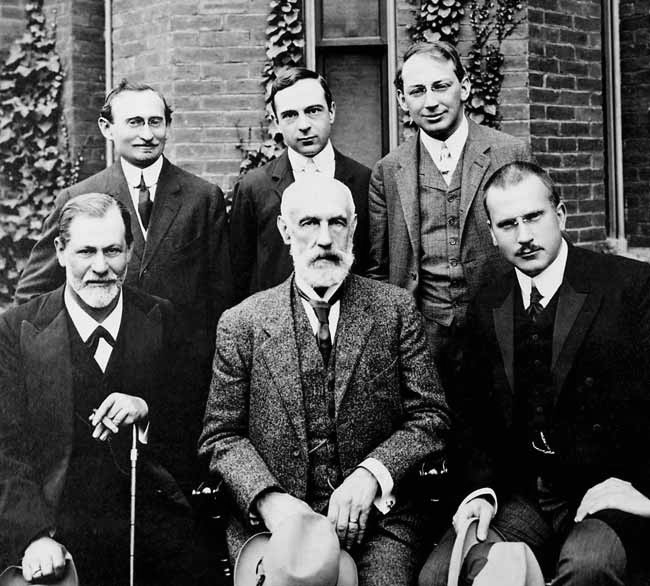
At Clark University, 1909. Front row: Freud, G. Stanley Hall, Carl Jung; back row: Abraham Brill, Ernest Jones, Sándor Ferenczi

Freud remembers a session with a young man who had felt suicidal because of his homosexuality. The man’s father is enraged with Freud because his son is now “rejoicing in his depravity”. The man’s mother is more accepting and reveals it was she who had persuaded her son to see Freud. She has read and liked The Interpretation of Dreams. She promises Freud to speak to the Minister of Education. At a stammtisch Freud announces that the need for psychoanalytic therapy of neuroses has been approved in parliament. The Vienna Psychoanalytic Society is formed. The group assembles outside for a formal photograph. Freud proposes it has a yearbook to be edited by Jung, whom he regards as his successor. He feels betrayed by Adler, Stekel and Rank who are developing their own theories. Freud learns that Jung is also not the loyal disciple he thinks.

During a lecture Freud notices a fleck of blood as he speaks. He visits Dr Hajek whose initial diagnosis of a benign tumour becomes cancer of the mouth. Freud has multiple operations and is fitted with a prothesis. Freud hears the voice of his cancer taunting him. He dreams of an encounter with Lou Andreas-Salomé who mocks his lack of knowledge about women. Other women materialize, Helene Deutsch, Melanie Klein who tell him his Oedipus theory is wrong; penis envy is nonsense. Freud awakes from his dream sweating. Later, the voice of his cancer returns. He needs morphine to ease the pain. He reminds the doctor about the ‘arrangement’ when the pain becomes unbearable.

=== Trotsky's in New York ===
Leon Trotsky is in New York and commissions a young woman named Olga to transcribe history musings into a manuscript. Trotsky upsets numerous New York natives by expressing doubt about the will of the American worker and laughing at the idea that all men are created equal. As he is transcribing a piece he mentioned that he believes that the Americans are silly for “wasting millions of dollars on a useless war”. Olga writes simply “war” but Trotsky emphasizes that he specified a “useless war”. As Trotsky pontificates to Olga, she eventually grows tired of what she suspects to be lies and believes that once a substantial number of his followers begin to question his world view he will cast them aside. Olga leaves and Trotsky, though angry confesses he finds himself attracted to her due to her assertiveness. During a public talk by Trotsky, a New York politician named Ernst Schnitzler announces that an American submarine has been sunk and tries to start a riot but Trotsky denies that such a submarine existed. Trotsky is bullied by the American working class who resent him telling them how to run their country. One night he narrowly avoids being beaten by a gang of New York street thugs and he decides to leave after he hears that a revolution has taken place in his home country.

=== The End of the World ===
A rogue, extrasolar planet is on collision course with the Earth. A small number of people are aware that the collision will be catastrophic and destroy the Earth. The general public is not told the whole truth. In America, a secretive project is initiated to evacuate a carefully selected group of fifty scientists (25 male and 25 female) onboard a giant spaceship that will save humanity. The project is led by Professor Hubert Frame and his daughter Dr. Vanessa (“Van”) Brodie, both renowned ouranologists, and subsequently appointed Head of Enterprise, Paul Bartlett. The spaceship is located in a remote, secretive site in central Kansas where the designated passengers will muster.

Vanessa is married to Valentine (“Val”) Brodie, a lecturer in science fiction at the University of Westchester, and a moderately successful writer on the subject. His students question him about the TV news story about "Lynx", the so-named space object heading towards Earth. Val dismisses the story and reassures his students that the object will spin harmlessly around the sun and then disappear. Van and Val's marriage is in difficulty and following a row, Val goes downtown to drink where he befriends a department store Santa (and ex-actor) named Courtland Willet. Knowing that married couples will not be allowed on board the spaceship, Vanessa arranges to divorce her husband so that he will get a place on the spaceship based on his own merits. Before departing to the spaceship site, Val goes to have a final drink with Willett. The two get arrested and Val misses the flight with Vanessa who is later told (untruthfully) by her father that Val has been killed in a brawl in New York. Val and Willett are soon released from custody, and find refuge from the violent storms and rising sea levels in various New York hotels where they remain for some months while the storms subside and then helping with the city cleanup. Although Val was never told the exact location of the spaceship, he later realises he had predicted its likely location in one of his old sci-fi books. Val and Willett embark on a frantic journey to Kansas to reach, and hopefully board, the spaceship.

Meanwhile, one of the fifty scientists on board the spaceship is Nat Goya who tells Bartlett that his computers have made a mistake as he is a married man with a child on the way. He tells Bartlett that if his wife is not allowed on board then he wants to leave but Bartlett refuses as Goya is the world’s best micro-agronomist. Goya escapes from the spaceship site, but is quickly recaptured and then executed. Nat’s religious, now widowed wife, Edwina, is convinced her unborn child is the Lord’s child, the Second Coming. She convinces Calvin Gropius, an evangelical preacher, that they are destined for righteous salvation onboard the spaceship and embark on a frantic journey to Kansas too.

On board the spaceship, before giving his farewell speech, Frame confesses to Vanessa that he had lied about Val being dead, and hopes he is still alive. He then switches off his respirator and dies. Outside, the various parties finally arrive at the site and demand to board the spaceship. In the fighting that ensues, Calvin Gropius and Bartlett are killed. Val is reunited with Vanessa and assumes command. Willet decides that he will not stay on board the spaceship and instead remain on the Earth. Before departing, Willet gives Val two video discs, Freud and Trotsky’s in New York, which he declares sum up the preoccupations of the race - nature of the soul and the problem of right government. After a ceremonial playing of Mozart’s Jupiter Symphony, the spaceship takes off to seek a new world.

=== Epilogue ===
The book ends in a classroom on the spaceship, at an unknown date and place in the future, where a teacher named Valentine O'Grady is asking his young students (descendants of the original fifty scientists, Edwina and her child) their thoughts on the story he has just told them. The children think the people and events described are just a myth. They believe that they have always been on the spaceship and do not recognise being on a journey as told by O’Grady. The children refer to another myth they know about, which involves a bad man called "Fred Fraud" and a good one called "Trot Sky". The school bell rings and the students hastily leave the classroom, having already forgotten what O'Grady was trying to tell them.

== Reception ==
The novel is included by Margaret Scanlan in a selection of contemporary books that demonstrate the relevance of the historical fiction genre. The “spatialized history” of the three stories spliced together “offers a powerful critique of what Burgess sees as the ahistorical tendencies of contemporary culture (…) The comedy grows blacker as we realize how the novel begins and ends in misinterpretation: nothing less than the end of the world and the death of culture has, after all, taken place”.

Michael Wood considers the novel “a love song to what would be lost if the world went away” with all its colours, tastes, smells and forgivable mistakes. The novel might be considered “chaff” amongst Burgess’ prolific and phenomenal output, but it still “looks pretty good”.

The book was included in The Guardian’s list of science fiction and fantasy novels that “everyone must read”.

Reviewing the book for The New York Times, Anatole Broyard concluded that "Mr. Burgess might have written a very good science-fiction novel if he had been more interested in entertaining the reader rather than himself." Michael Dirda, writing in The Washington Post, considered that he had "never read a worse novel than The End of the World News".
