= The Worm and the Ring =

1960 novel by Anthony Burgess

- First edition (publ. Heinemann)
- Author: Anthony Burgess
- Language: English
- Publication date: 1960

The Worm and the Ring is a 1960 novel by English novelist Anthony Burgess, drawing on his time as a teacher at Banbury Grammar School, Oxfordshire, England, in the early 1950s.

It is Burgess's version of the Ring Cycle. The Dragon pub in the novel corresponds to the worm and a purloined diary to the ring.

== Characters ==
(Wagnerian equivalents in brackets)

- Woolton, the school principal (Wotan)
- Frederica, Woolton's wife (Fricka)
- Lodge (Loge)
- Albert Rich, a student at the school (Alberich)
- three female students (the Rhinemaidens)
- Linda (Woglinde, one of the Rhinemaidens)

== Libel action and revised edition ==
The novel was withdrawn from circulation following a libel action by Gwendoline Bustin, the secretary of Banbury Grammar School, where Burgess had taught in the early 1950s. Several characters were recognisable as figures from the school, but only Miss Bustin, later Lady Mayoress of Banbury, objected. Heinemann agreed to "amend all unsold copies of the book" (The Times, 25 October 1962) but actually pulped them.

A revised edition of the novel, with the libellous elements removed, was published in 1970.
