= Bedford Dormobile =

1960s-era campervan conversion

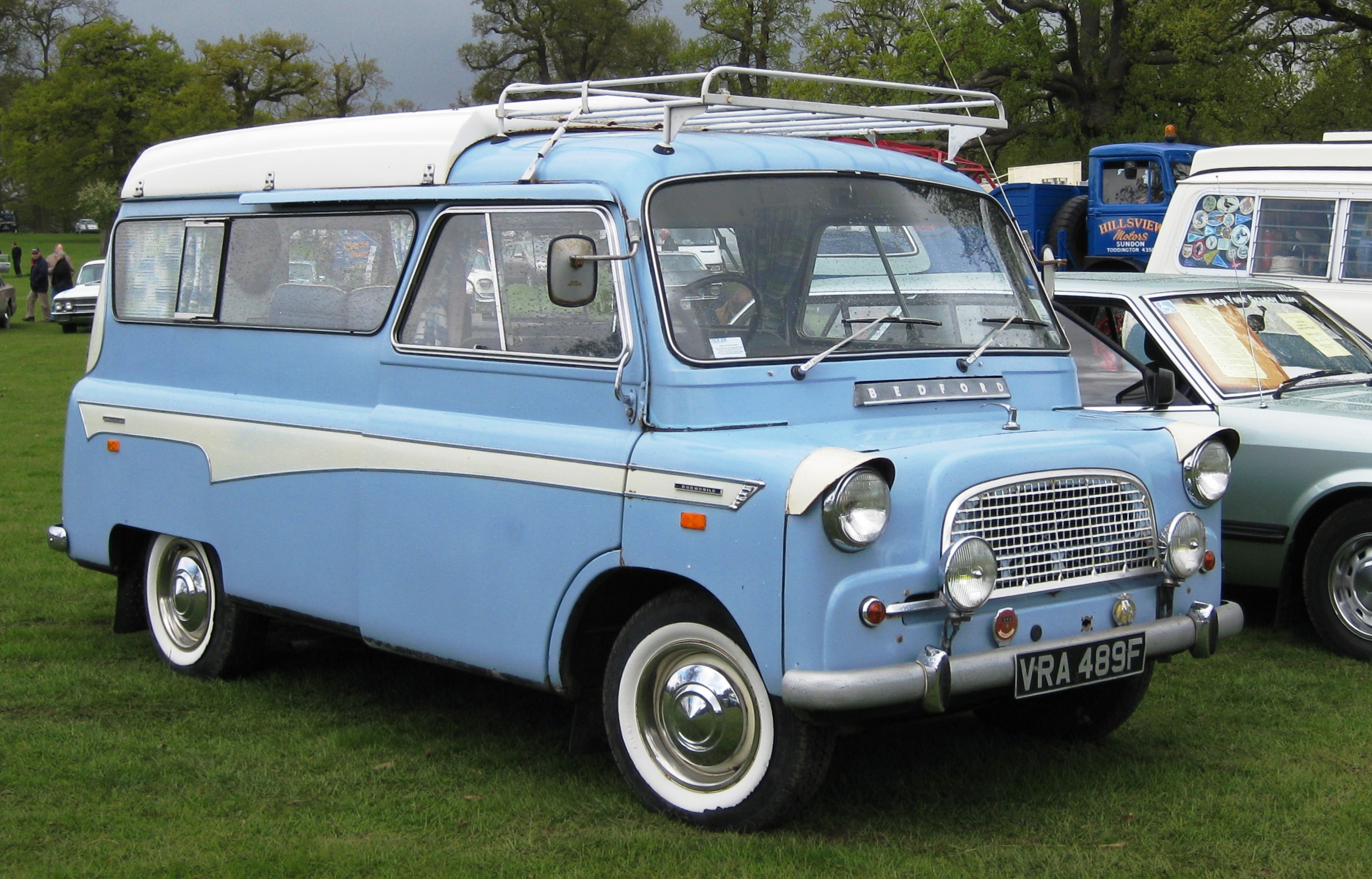
- Bedford CA Dormobile

Overview
- Manufacturer: Martin Walter of Folkestone
- Production: 1957–present
- Assembly: Folkestone, Kent (1957–1990s); Lyndhurst, Hampshire (1997–present)

Body and chassis
- Class: Campervan conversion
- Related: Bedford CA; Bedford CF

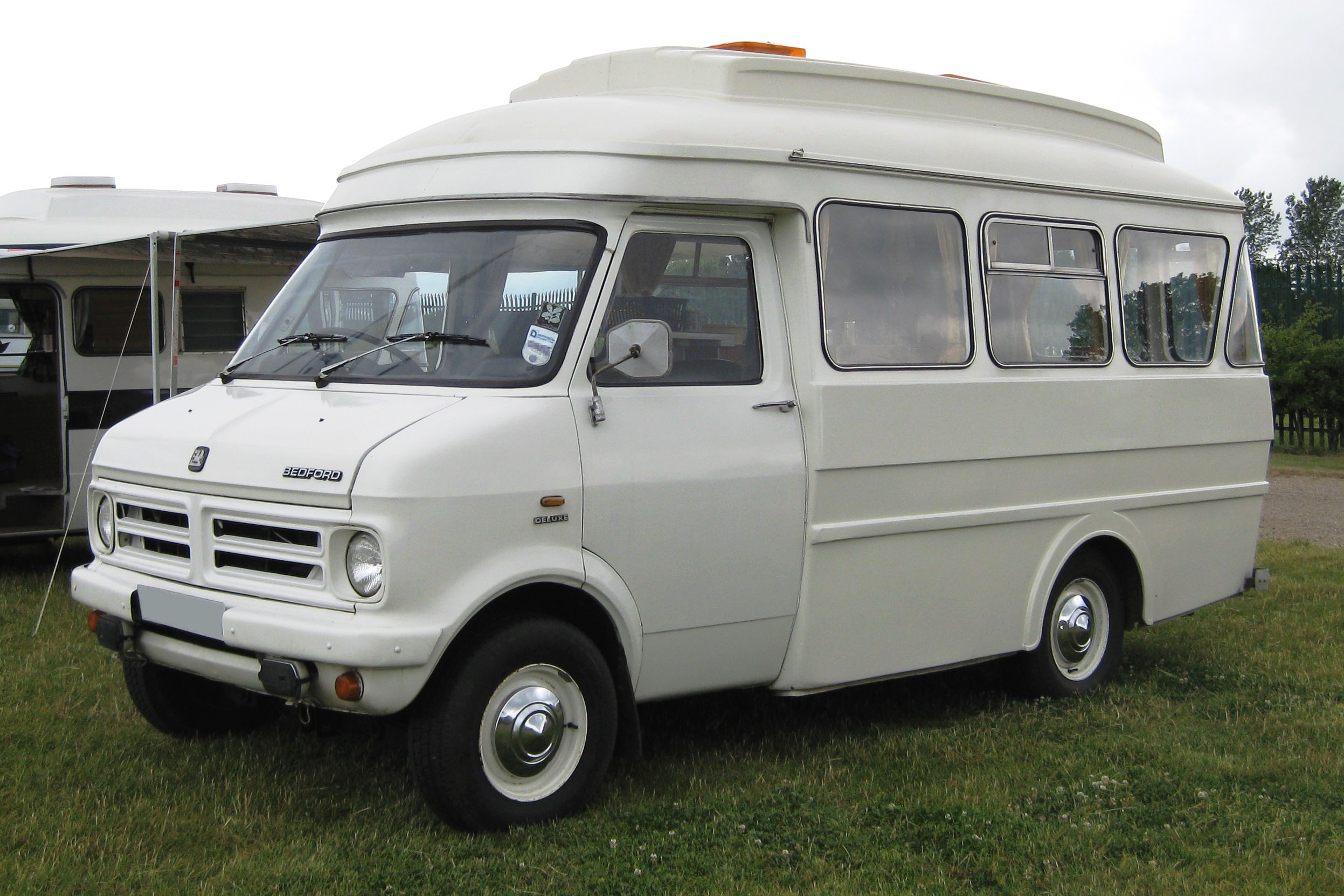
Dormobile's top model in the early 1970s was the Bedford CF based Dormobile Debonair "coach-built" conversion, with body panels formed from GRP.

The Dormobile is a 1950s-era onwards campervan (motorcaravan, motorhome) conversion manufactured by the coachbuilder Martin Walter of Folkestone in Kent.

Initially based on the Bedford CA van, the name is associated more with those and subsequent Bedford CF conversions than with other vehicles converted.

== History ==
The first Bedford CA based Dormobile motorhome, complete with a gas stove, a sink and cupboards and seats which converted into beds, appeared in 1957. The elevating roof, hinged on one side and featuring a red and white striped canopy, was quickly evolved in order to make it possible to stand within the vehicle. The campervan idea originated as a compromise negotiated with the UK tax office. Earlier in the 1950s, the manufacturers specialised in converting the Bedford CA van into a mini-bus, featuring extra side windows and seats. The UK tax authorities asserted that the converted vehicle was effectively a form of estate car, and therefore its retail price should bear passenger car purchase tax, a burden from which buyers of vans were spared. However, the manufacturers negotiated an agreement whereby Dormobile converted vans could be sold without purchase tax, provided they incorporated "built-in life support equipment" such as a cooking device, and facilities for the washing and storage of clothes. These stipulations triggered a move away from minibus conversions to motorhome conversions, which carved out a substantial new life-style market as the ensuing decade saw a substantial increase in disposable incomes in the UK.

The novelist Anthony Burgess and his wife, Liana, owned one and used it as a home and means of travelling throughout Western Europe in the late 1960s. Burgess described the Bedford Dormobile as "a miracle of British design, although much let down by slipshod British execution – screws missing, bad wood-planing ..."

== Dormobile ==
Other vans were converted under the Dormobile name such as Morris Commercial Cars, VW, BMC, Land-Rover, Ford, Leyland, and Commer. Some of these early vans used for Dormobile conversions were identified by the distinctive side stripe panel, usually painted in a stand out colour. They included Bedford, The Ford Thames, Commer and Morris & Austin J4.

The company subsequently converted a number of different van-based vehicles to other uses, including minibuses and ambulances, before collapsing in the mid-1990s. In 1997, Dormobile Ltd. was revived and is now based in Lyndhurst, Hampshire. The company carries out modern camper conversions as well as supplying spare parts and full restorations of the classic models.

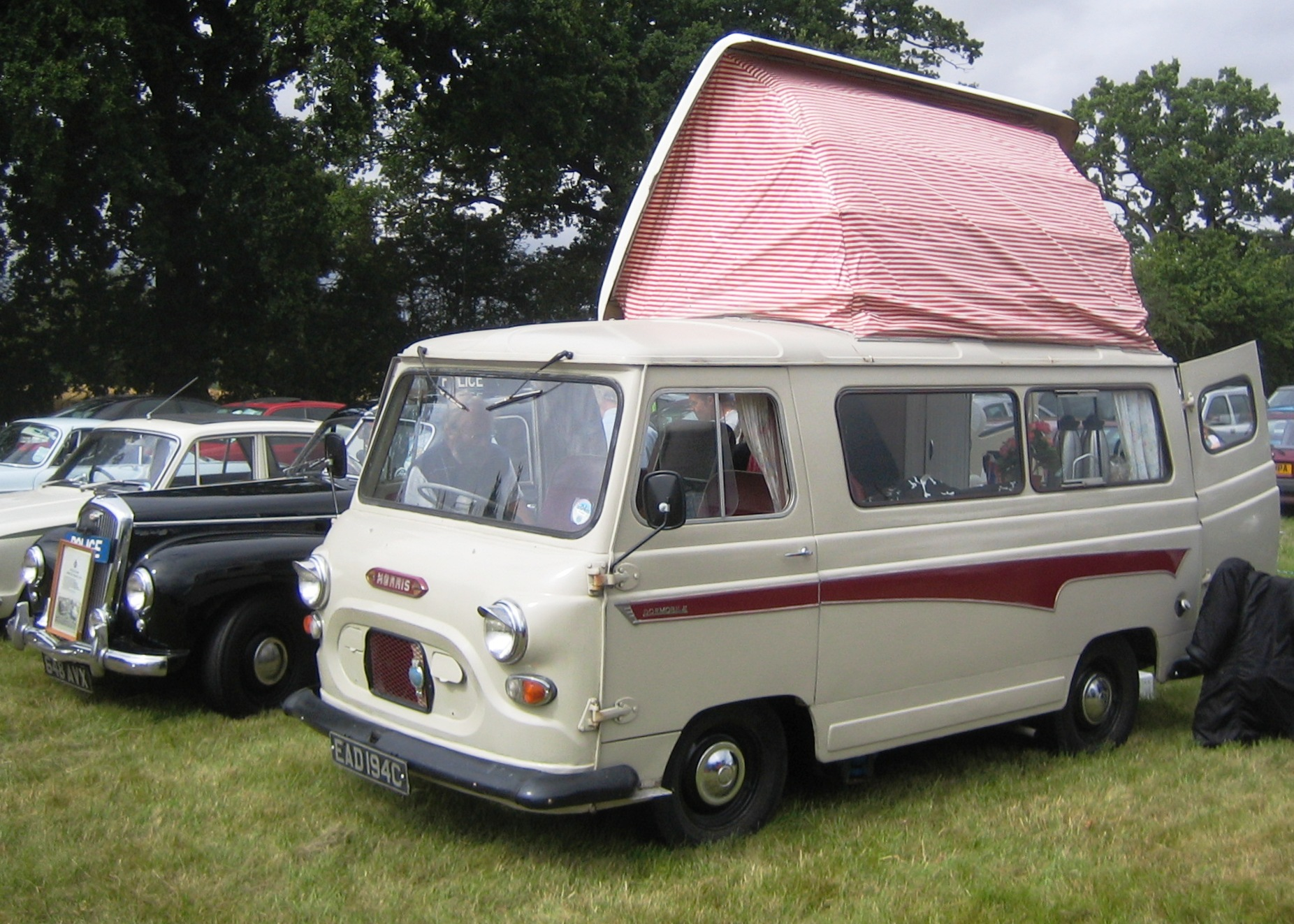
Although the Dormobile name was primarily associated with motor homes based on the front-engined Bedford CA, conversions were also offered of competitor vehicles such as this 1965 Morris J4.

== See also ==
- Volkswagen Westfalia Campers
