= A Vision of Battlements =

1965 novel by Anthony Burgess

- First edition
- Author: Anthony Burgess
- Illustrator: Edward Pagram
- Published: Sidgwick & Jackson: London, 1965
- Pages: 265
- OCLC: 559438259

A Vision of Battlements is a 1965 novel by Anthony Burgess based on his experiences during World War II in Gibraltar, where he was serving with the British army. It is Burgess's first novel: while it was not published until 1965, Burgess wrote it in 1949. As he explained in his introduction to the novel, "I was empty of music but itching to create. So I wrote this novel ... to see if I could clear my head of the dead weight of Gibraltar."

== Plot ==
The story draws from Burgess's experience of being stationed in Gibraltar during the Second World War and satirises traditional notions of battle heroism by parodying the Aeneid. The antihero Richard Ennis takes the place of Aeneas.

The title, in addition to its Gibraltarian associations, contains a reference to the appearance of certain objects in the eye of one who has astigmatism.
