= You've Had Your Time =

1990 book by Anthony Burgess

You've Had Your Time, Vol II
- First edition
- Author: Anthony Burgess
- Genre: Autobiography
- Published: 1990 (Heinemann)
- ISBN: 0-434-09821-3
- OCLC: 24590897
- Preceded by: Little Wilson and Big God

You've Had Your Time, full title: You've Had Your Time: Being the Second Part of the Confessions of Anthony Burgess, is the second volume of English writer Anthony Burgess's autobiography. Preceded by Little Wilson and Big God and first published by Heinemann in 1990, it covers a period of 30 years, from Burgess's return to England from Malaya in 1959 through his time in Malta and Rome, and culminating in his move to Monaco.
