= Any Old Iron (novel) =

1989 novel by Anthony Burgess

- First edition cover
- Author: Anthony Burgess
- Cover artist: Pisanello, "Il Torneo-battaglia di Louvezerp", 1436–1444
- Language: English
- Publisher: Hutchinson (UK), Random House (US)
- Publication date: 1989
- Publication place: London, United Kingdom; New York, N.Y., United States
- ISBN: 978-0-09-173842-6
- OCLC: 18780661

Any Old Iron is a fantasy novel by British writer Anthony Burgess, published in 1989.

Divided into seven parts numbered in Welsh ("Un", "Dau", "Tri", "Pedwar", "Pump", "Chwech" and "Saith"), the novel revolves on a modern update of the Excalibur legend. Among the historical figures fictionalised in the novel are Chaim Weizmann, A. J. Cronin, Winston Churchill, Éamon de Valera, Anthony Eden and Joseph Stalin.

The action centres on the progress of a Welsh-Jewish family through the tumultuous first half of the 20th century and culminates in the birth of Israel.
