= The Pianoplayers =

1986 novel by Anthony Burgess

- First edition (UK)
- Author: Anthony Burgess
- Language: English
- Genre: Novel
- Publisher: Hutchinson (UK); Arbor House (US)
- Publication date: 1986
- Publication place: United Kingdom
- Media type: Print (Hardback & Paperback)
- Pages: 208 pp (hardback edition)
- ISBN: 0-09-165190-5 (hardback edition)
- OCLC: 16364951

The Pianoplayers is a 1986 novel by Anthony Burgess that draws on memories of his early life in Manchester in the 1920s and 1930s; particularly, the novel focuses on the life of his father Joe, a pub and cinema pianist. The child narrator Ellen Henshaw and her father Billy have a series of picaresque adventures in Manchester and Blackpool, culminating in the death of Billy as he attempts to break the world record for non-stop pianoplaying; later in life, Ellen travels the world setting up 'schools of love' and becomes the most sought after 'companion' in France.

The novel was first published by Hutchinson in the UK and Arbor House in the US. A new edition with an introduction and notes by Will Carr was published as part of the Irwell Edition of the Works of Anthony Burgess by Manchester University Press in 2017.
