= The Right to an Answer =

1960 novel by Anthony Burgess

- First edition cover
- Author: Anthony Burgess
- Language: English
- Genre: Comic novel
- Publisher: Heinemann
- Publication date: 1960
- Publication place: United Kingdom
- Media type: Print (Hardback & Paperback)

The Right to an Answer is a darkly comic 1960 novel by Anthony Burgess, the first of his repatriate years (1960–69). One of its themes is the disillusionment of the returning exile. The critic William H. Pritchard described the novel in a 1966 publication as "surely Burgess's most engaging novel".

== Characters and plot ==
- J.W. Denham, the narrator of the novel, is a British businessman who lives and works in Japan, but has returned to his hometown, Leicester, because his father is dying. Describing himself as a "professional expatriate", Denham leaves a mistress, Michiko, behind in Tokyo. He spends much of his time during his sojourn in the UK seeking sexual sustenance and "imbibing liquors of all kinds".
- Mr Raj, the novel's central character, has recently arrived from Sri Lanka and is trying to find his way in British society. Mr Raj is unfailingly polite, but soon shows that he is a man of power, hence his name, which means "rule". In a reversal of roles, it is he who comes to rule the English. He has some rather unattractive features, displaying, for example, strong prejudices against black people. He introduces Denham's father, on the eve of his death, to the delights of fiery Ceylonese curries. The surprises Mr Raj has for Denham himself, involving the latter's living arrangements, turn out to be less than pleasant. and Mr Raj later does something that is even more shocking.
- Ted Arden, the efficient and sympathetic landlord of the local pub, lays on a meal and makes a speech after the funeral of Denham's father. His name and family links have Shakespearean associations.
