= Napoleon Symphony =

1974 novel by Anthony Burgess

Napoleon Symphony: A Novel in Four Movements
- 1974 Alfred A. Knopf edition
- Author: Anthony Burgess
- Language: English
- Publication date: 1974

Napoleon Symphony: A Novel in Four Movements (ISBN 0-224-01009-3) is Anthony Burgess's fictional recreation of the life and world of Napoleon Bonaparte, first published in 1974 (by Jonathan Cape in the UK and Alfred A. Knopf in the US). Its four "movements" follow the structure of Beethoven's Symphony No. 3, known as the Eroica. Burgess said he found the novel "elephantine fun" to write.

== Synopsis ==
Burgess's Bonaparte is a cuckold suffering from heartburn and halitosis who is portrayed as a wily seducer of Tsar Alexander I of Russia. His conquest of Egypt is a central theme of the novel, which presents a comedic but detailed and revealing portrait of an Arab and Muslim society under occupation by a Christian Western power.

== Background ==
Beethoven had originally dedicated his Third Symphony to Bonaparte. But when he learned that Napoleon had crowned himself Emperor, he tore the dedication from the manuscript. When the work was published it was titled, Sinfonia eroica, composta per festeggiare il sovvenire d'un grand'Uomo (Heroic symphony, composed to celebrate the memory of a great man), known to posterity as the Eroica.

The novel is dedicated to Stanley Kubrick, who had directed the film adaptation of Burgess's earlier novel, A Clockwork Orange. Kubrick had intended to make a biographical film about Bonaparte, but was dissatisfied with his own screenplay. They corresponded, then met in December 1971. Burgess suggested to Kubrick that the structure of the film could be based on the Eroica symphony, and was asked by Kubrick to write a novel based on this concept to serve as the basis for a screenplay. Using his own knowledge of symphonic structure, Burgess based his writing closely on the sequence of Beethoven's work, with Napoleon's funeral followed by a resurrection. In June 1972 he sent the first section to Kubrick, who responded with regret that the treatment was unsuitable for a film, writing, "the [manuscript] is not a work that can help me make a film about the life of Napoleon." Freed from these constraints, Burgess developed the work into an experimental novel. He reworked the material into a stage play called Napoleon Rising for the Royal Shakespeare Company, but it remained unperformed in his lifetime. It was first performed in a radio adaptation for the BBC on 2 December 2012.

== Reception ==
Burgess suggested that reviews on both sides of the Atlantic were "mixed", with negative reviews from Peter Ackroyd in The Spectator, and from The New Yorker.

Two years later, when the novel was published in French, Burgess noted that reviews were more positive.
