= Byrne (novel) =

1995 novel by Anthony Burgess

- First edition (publ. Hutchinson); Cover art: William Blake, "The Agony in the Garden", c 1799-1800
- Author: Anthony Burgess
- Publisher: Hutchinson Publishing
- Publication date: January 1, 1995
- ISBN: 978-0-091-79204-6

Byrne is the last novel by the English author Anthony Burgess, published posthumously in 1995.

Composed mostly in the same ottava rima stanzas that Byron used for his Don Juan, the story follows the fortunes of Michael Byrne, an Irishman with some Spanish ancestors who settled in Ireland after a war between England's Royal Navy and the Spanish Armada in the 16th century.

He thought he was a kind of living myth
And hence deserving of ottava rima,
The scheme that Ariosto juggled with,
Apt for a lecherous defective dreamer.
He'd have preferred a stronger-muscled smith,
Anvilling rhymes amid poetic steam, a
Sort of Lord Byron. Byron was long dead.
This poetaster had to do instead.

— Part One, stanza 2

A painter and composer whose career is never as spectacular as his ambitions, and a determined womanizer who fathers children across the globe, Byrne becomes embroiled with the Nazi regime in 1930s Germany.

A heavy task, but there was light relief
In the Germanic ambience, boisterous, brash,
Torchlit parades and pogroms, guttural grief
In emigration queues, the smash and crash
Of pawnshop windows by insentient beef
In uniform, the gush of beer, the splash
Of schnapps, the joy of being drunk and Aryan,
Though Hitler was a teetotalitarian.

— Part One, stanza 103

Eventually he vanishes, presumed dead in Africa. But years later, his twin sons, now middle-aged, one a doubting priest, the other suffering from a debilitating disease, receive from Byrne, who is still alive, an invitation to London, where he will read his last will and testament.
