= A Mouthful of Air (book) =

1992 book on linguistics by Anthony Burgess

- First edition (UK)
- Author: Anthony Burgess
- Language: English
- Subject: Linguistics
- Publisher: Hutchinson (UK); William Morrow & Co (US)
- Publication date: October 1992 (UK); August 1993 (US)
- Media type: Hardcover
- Pages: 352
- ISBN: 0-09-177415-2
- OCLC: 27224188
- Dewey Decimal: 420 20
- LC Class: PE1072 .B796 1992

A Mouthful of Air: Language and Languages, Especially English is a book on linguistics by Anthony Burgess published in 1992.

== Topics ==
Topics covered in the book include:

- the mechanics of linguistic sounds;
- the development of the English language, and its connections with other languages;
- the making of dictionaries;
- the importance of slang;
- the International Phonetic Alphabet;
- the role of dialect;
- the best way to learn a foreign language;
- and a look at specific languages (including Russian, Japanese, and Malay).
