= Little Wilson and Big God =

Volume I of Anthony Burgess's autobiography

First edition (publ. Weidenfeld & Nicolson)

Little Wilson and Big God, volume I of Anthony Burgess's autobiography, was first published by Weidenfeld & Nicolson in 1986. It won the J. R. Ackerley Prize for Autobiography.

The work describes a period of over 40 years from Burgess's birth, in 1917, to 1959, when his time as teacher and education officer in Malaya and Borneo came to an end.

The writer's education at Xaverian College and at Manchester University, his war service at an army garrison in Gibraltar, and his service as a teacher at Banbury Grammar School (which he describes as one of the happiest periods of his life) are all covered in detail.

One of the most significant literary autobiographies in English of the latter part of the 20th century, the book has been described as resembling a picaresque novel in the vividness of its descriptions and its readability.

Roger Lewis opined that "It is perhaps Burgess's memoirs...which constitute his best novels, his masterpieces."
