= The Malayan Trilogy =

1956-1959 book series by Anthony Burgess

The Malayan Trilogy The Long Day Wanes: A Malayan Trilogy
- First omnibus edition (publ. Penguin, 1972); Cover art by Peter Bentley
- Time for a Tiger; The Enemy in the Blanket; Beds in the East
- Author: Anthony Burgess
- Country: United Kingdom
- Language: English
- Genre: Colonial novel
- Publisher: Heinemann
- Published: 1956 (Time for a Tiger); 1958 (The Enemy in the Blanket); 1959 (Beds in the East)
- Media type: Print (paperback)

The Malayan Trilogy, also published as The Long Day Wanes: A Malayan Trilogy in the United States, is a comic 'triptych' of novels by Anthony Burgess set amidst the decolonisation of Malaya.

It is a detailed fictional exploration of the effects of the Malayan Emergency and of Britain's final withdrawal from its Southeast Asian territories. The American title, decided on by Burgess himself, is taken from Alfred, Lord Tennyson's poem Ulysses: 'The lights begin to twinkle from the rocks: | The long day wanes: the slow moon climbs: the deep | Moans round with many voices. Come, my friends, | 'Tis not too late to seek a newer world.' (ll. 55–57)

The three volumes are:

- Time for a Tiger (1956)
- The Enemy in the Blanket (1958)
- Beds in the East (1959)

The trilogy tracks the fortunes of the history teacher Victor Crabbe, his professional difficulties, his marriage problems, and his attempt to do his duty in the war against the insurgents.

== Time for a Tiger ==
Time for a Tiger
- First edition
- Author: Anthony Burgess
- Language: English
- Series: The Long Day Wanes
- Genre: Colonial novel
- Publisher: Heinemann
- Publication date: 1956
- Publication place: United Kingdom
- Media type: Print (Hardback & Paperback)
- Followed by: The Enemy in the Blanket

Time for a Tiger, the first part of the trilogy, is dedicated, in Jawi script on the first page of the book, "to all my Malayan friends" ("Kepada sahabat-sahabat saya di Tanah Melayu"). It was Burgess's first published work of fiction and appeared in 1956. The title alludes to an advertising slogan for Tiger beer, then, as now, popular in the Malay peninsula. The action centres on the vicissitudes of Victor Crabbe, a history teacher at an elite school for all the peninsula's ethnic groups – Malay Chinese and Indian – the Mansor School, in Kuala Hantu (modelled on the Malay College at Kuala Kangsar, Perak and Raffles Institution, Singapore).

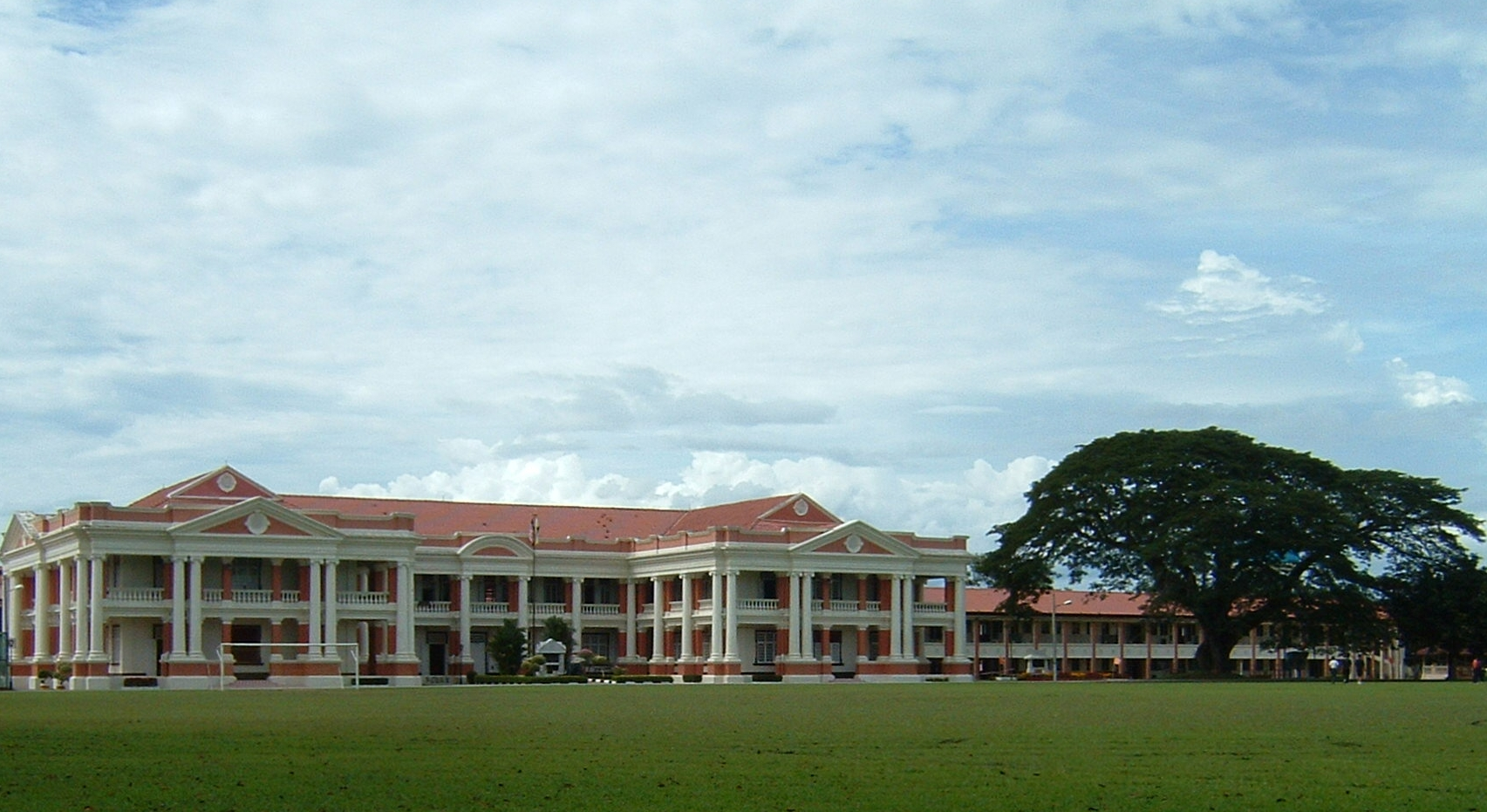
Malay College Kuala Kangsar, on which Mansor School is based.

Victor Crabbe, a resident teacher at the Mansor School, seeks to tackle the threat posed by a boy Communist who appears to be conducting clandestine night-time indoctrination sessions with fellow students. But the headmaster, Boothby, scoffs at Crabbe's warnings.

Nabby Adams, an alcoholic police lieutenant who prefers warm beer ("he could not abide it cold"), persuades Crabbe to buy a car, enabling Adams to make a commission as a middleman. This is despite the fact that Crabbe will not drive because of a traumatic car accident in which his first wife died and he was the driver.

Crabbe's marriage to the blonde Fenella is crumbling, while he carries on an affair with a Malay divorcee employed at a nightclub. A junior police officer who works for Adams, Alladad Khan, (who has a secret crush on Fenella) moonlights as a driver for the couple. Ibrahim bin Mohamed Salleh, a (married) gay cook, works for the couple but is being pursued by the wife he has fled from after being forced to marry her by his family.

The threads of the plot come together when Alladad Khan drives Crabbe, Fenella and Adams to a nearby village, along a route where they face possible ambush by Chinese terrorists. Due to unforeseen circumstances, they return late to the school's speech day and an unexpected chain of events follows that transforms the lives of all the main characters.

== The Enemy in the Blanket ==
The title is a literal translation of the Malay idiom "musuh dalam selimut", which means to be betrayed by an intimate (somewhat similar but not quite the same as the English "sleeping with the enemy"), alluding to the struggles of marriage but also other betrayals in the story. The novel continues the adventures of Victor Crabbe, who becomes headmaster of a school in the imaginary sultanate of Dahaga (meaning thirst in Malay and identifiable with Kelantan) in the years and months leading up to Malayan independence. Crabbe is made headmaster of a school in Dahaga, in the east coast of Malaya (in an introduction to the trilogy, he identifies the sultanate as Kota Baharu in Kelantan).

Burgess was dismayed by the design of the cover of the 1958 Heinemann edition of the novel, presumably designed in London. It shows a Sikh working as a rickshaw-puller, something unheard of in Malaya or anywhere else. He wrote in his autobiography (Little Wilson and Big God, p. 416): "The design on [the] dust-jacket showed a Sikh pulling a white man and woman in a jinrickshaw. I, who had always looked up to publishers, was discovering that they could be as inept as authors. The reviewers would blame me, not the cover-designer, for that blatant display of ignorance."

== Beds in the East ==
The title is taken from a line spoken by Mark Antony in Antony and Cleopatra II.vi.49–52: 'The beds i' the east are soft. And thanks to you,/That call'd me timelier than my purpose hither;/For I have gain'd by 't.'

== Main characters ==
- Victor Crabbe, initially a resident teacher at the Mansor School, seeks to tackle the threat posed by a boy Communist who appears to be conducting clandestine night-time indoctrination sessions with fellow students. But the headmaster, Boothby, scoffs at Crabbe's warnings. Crabbe later becomes a headmaster and, in the third book, an education officer.
- Fenella, Crabbe's second wife
- Nabby Adams (in Time for a Tiger), an alcoholic police lieutenant who prefers warm beer ("he could not abide it cold"). He persuades Crabbe to buy a car, enabling Adams to make a commission as a middleman, even though Crabbe will not drive because of a traumatic car accident in which his first wife died and he was the driver.
- Ah Wing (in The Enemy in the Blanket), Crabbe's elderly Chinese cook, who, it emerges, has been supplying the insurgents with provisions
- Ibrahim (in “Time for a Tiger”), the Crabbes’ transvestite servant who fears being found by his wife whom he was forced to marry by his family
- Abdul Kadir (in The Enemy in the Blanket), Crabbe's hard-drinking and foul-mouthed teaching colleague at the school, whose every sentence includes the words "For fuck's sake!"
- The hard-up lawyer Rupert Hardman (in The Enemy in the Blanket), who converts to Islam in order to wed a domineering Muslim woman, 'Che Normah, for her money. He later bitterly regrets it and tries to return to the West in order to escape the marriage.
- Talbot (in The Enemy in the Blanket), the State Education Officer, a fat-buttocked gourmand whom Victor Crabbe cuckolds, and who himself cuckolded Crabbe years earlier
- Anne Talbot (in The Enemy in the Blanket), Talbot's wife, a wanton but unhappy adulteress
- The womanising Abang of Dahaga (in The Enemy in the Blanket), who is also a devotee of chess, and who aims both to seduce Crabbe's wife and to purloin his car
- Father Laforgue (in The Enemy in the Blanket), a priest who has spent most of his life in China and longs to return there. but is prevented from doing so, having been banished by the Communist regime
- Jaganathan (in The Enemy in the Blanket), a fellow teacher who plots to supplant and ruin Crabbe
- Mohinder Singh ( (in The Enemy in the Blanket), a shopkeeper trying desperately, and failing, to compete with Chinese traders
- Robert Loo (in Beds in the East), a brilliant boy composer whose musical career Crabbe seeks to further
- Rosemary Michael (in Beds in the East), an "eminently nubile" Tamil with "quite considerable capacity for all kinds of sensuous pleasure" and an inability to tell the truth, even to herself
- Tommy Jones (in Beds in the East), a beer salesman. "That's my line. I sell beer all over the East. Thirty years on the job. Three thousand a month and a car allowance and welcome wherever I go."
- Lim Cheng Po (in Beds in the East), an Anglophile lawyer
- Tuan Haji Mohammed Nasir Bin Abdul Talib (in Beds in the East), an Australian judge who harbours a secret resentment against the English
- Moneypenny (in Beds in the East), an anthropologist living in the Malayan jungle and studying hill tribes. He has lost touch with civilisation to the extent that he believes it is lethal to laugh at butterflies and "now regarded even a lavatory as supererogatory".

== Bibliography ==
=== Editions ===
Initially published by Heinemann in discrete volumes, all known editions have since included all three novels in one volume. The list below excludes out-of-print editions, notably the paperback editions published by Penguin and Minerva in Britain, and W. W. Norton's hardback edition published in the United States in 1964.

- Burgess, Anthony The Malayan Trilogy. (London: Vintage, 2000) ISBN 978-0-7493-9592-6. This is the only edition that includes Burgess's retrospective introduction.
- Burgess, Anthony The Long Day Wanes: A Malayan Trilogy. (New York: W. W. Norton, 1993) ISBN 978-0-393-30943-0. U.S. paperback edition.

=== Works of criticism ===
- Bloom, Harold (ed.) Anthony Burgess. (New York: Chelsea House, 1987) ISBN 978-0-87754-676-4.
- Lewis, Roger Anthony Burgess. (London: Faber, 2002) ISBN 978-0-571-20492-2. A biography of Burgess.
- Yahya, Zawiah Resisting Colonialist Discourse. (Bangi: Penerbit Universiti Kebangsaan Malaysia, 1994) ISBN 978-967-942-296-2.
- Kerr, Douglas Eastern Figures: Orient and Empire in British Writing (Hong Kong: Hong Kong University Press, 2008) ISBN 978-962-209-934-0. pp 191–196.
- Erwin, Lee 'Britain's Small Wars: Domesticating "Emergency"', in The Edinburgh Companion to Twentieth-Century British and American War Literature, (eds.) Piette, A. and M. Rawlinson (Edinburgh: Edinburgh University Press, 2012) ISBN 978-0-7486-3874-1. pp. 81–89.
