= Nothomb =

Nothomb may refer to:

== People ==
- Charles-Ferdinand Nothomb
- Jean-Baptiste Nothomb
- Jean-François Nothomb (1919-2008), Belgian escape line leader, World War II
- Patrick Nothomb
  - Amélie Nothomb
  - Juliette Nothomb
- Pierre Nothomb

== Other ==
- Nothomb, Wallonia, municipality in Belgium
- Nothomb (creek), a tributary of the Attert
