= Mercure (novel) =

1998 novel by Amélie Nothomb

- First edition
- Author: Amélie Nothomb
- Genre: Novel
- Publisher: Albin Michel
- Publication date: 1998
- Publication place: Belgium

Mercure is a Belgian novel by Amélie Nothomb. It was first published in 1998.

== Plot ==
The novel is set on the island of Mortes-Frontières, whose name (literally meaning "Dead Borders") is aptly chosen to reflect its ominous, isolated nature. Shrouded in secrecy and tightly controlled by the authoritarian Captain O. Loncours and his men, the island enforces strict surveillance and harsh treatment of outsiders.

Françoise, a young nurse, is summoned to this strange place to care for Hazel, a young woman who has been monstrously disfigured by a bombing. Upon arrival, Françoise discovers a bizarre house where all reflective objects—mirrors, spoons, anything capable of showing a reflection—have been removed.

The inhabitants of the island are suspicious and unwelcoming, and newcomers are subjected to thorough and merciless searches. Once inside the house, Françoise learns that she must tend to Hazel without ever asking a single question, under penalty of death. This strict rule gives rise to a series of peculiar and ambiguous conversations between the two women.

As in her earlier works, beginning with Hygiene and the Assassin, Amélie Nothomb explores themes of confinement, psychological tension, and human cruelty. With sharp prose and a taste for the grotesque, she challenges the reader's curiosity and fascination with dark, unsettling stories.

== Themes and structure ==
Like The Enemy's Cosmetique, Mercure is a novel whose pacing is largely built around a final revelation. Dialogue plays a central role, as in many of Amélie Nothomb’s works, notably Hygiene and the Assassin. The plot is simple, similar to that of a detective novel, and serves as a framework to explore recurring themes in Nothomb’s writing, such as fear of difference, physical appearance, and secrecy in human relationships.

The novel is notable for offering two alternative endings.

In Mercure, the title refers to mercury in both symbolic and mythological senses — Mercury being the god of medicine (with Françoise as a nurse caring for Hazel) and also the messenger god (with Françoise acting as a kind of messenger for Loncours) — as well as in a physical sense, as a substance used to measure temperature and one that reflects like a mirror.

The novel can also be read as a rewriting of three fairy tales: Beauty and the Beast (the most overt and dominant model), as well as two underlying tales that subvert the myth of the young woman waiting to be saved by a prince: Cinderella, paralyzed by her supposed ugliness, and Sleeping Beauty, portrayed as unconscious.
