= The Book of Proper Names =

2002 novel by Amélie Nothomb

- Author: Amélie Nothomb
- Original title: Robert des noms propres
- Translator: Shaun Whiteside
- Language: French
- Genre: Novel
- Publication date: 2002
- Publication place: Belgium
- Pages: 170
- ISBN: 2-226-13389-5
- Preceded by: The Enemy's Cosmetique
- Followed by: Antichrista

The Book of Proper Names (French: Robert des noms propres) is a Belgian novel by Amélie Nothomb. It was first published in 2002. It is a romanticized account of the life of the singer RoBERT, whom Nothomb became acquainted with as an avid admirer of her songs.

== Plot ==
In a vaguely surreal story, an extraordinary little girl is born from strange circumstances - her mother murdered her father, gave birth in prison, and then hanged herself. Plectrude, as the girl is unfortunately named by her mother, is adopted by her aunt and lives a fairy-like existence until she enrolls into the Paris Opera Ballet School, a rigorous institution portrayed as a "scalpel to slice away the last flesh of childhood."
