= Thirst (novel) =

2019 novel by Amélie Nothomb

- Author: Amélie Nothomb
- Original title: Soif
- Translator: Alison Anderson
- Language: French
- Genre: Philosophical fiction, Historical fiction
- Publisher: Éditions Albin Michel
- Publication date: 21 August 2019
- Publication place: Paris
- English publication date: 13 April 2021
- Media type: Print (paperback)
- Pages: 152
- ISBN: 978-2226443885
- Dewey Decimal: 843.914
- LC Class: PQ2674.O778 S65 2019

Thirst (French: Soif) is the 28th novel written by Amélie Nothomb, published on 21 August 2019 by Éditions Albin Michel.

== Writing the novel ==
Regarding the writing of the novel, she explains that: "All the books I wrote before this one were bodybuilding exercises designed to train me to write this book. There was premeditation, I knew that I wanted to write my book about Jesus, that that was what mattered to me. If I kept putting off the deadline, it was because I didn't feel strong enough, I wasn't yet the writing athlete I dreamed of being."

== Plot summary ==
The novel is written as a first-person interior monologue from the perspective of Jesus Christ. The narrative spans from his trial under Pontius Pilate, through the Passion, and concludes with his Resurrection. Throughout his final days, Jesus reflects upon his relationship with God the Father, his mother, human emotions, and physical sensations, most notably the concept of thirst. The narrative Jesus also reflects throughout the novel on his relationships with Judas, and with Mary Magdalene.

While awaiting death sentence, he reflects on the experience of having lived in a human body: hunger, thirst, pain, desire, tenderness, and fear. Distinguishing the novel from other theological writings on the person of Jesus Christ is the author's exploration of physicality, vulnerability, and attachment to earthly sensations and human emotions.

As the Passion unfolds, Jesus revisits his relationships with those around him, including Judas Iscariot, Mary Magdalene, his mother, and God the Father. The reader experiences many events well-known from the New Testament, but from His interiority.

He states: "I have the unfalsifiable conviction of being the most incarnate of humans" (J'ai la conviction infalsifiable d'être le plus incarné des humains.)

It concludes with the Resurrection, framed through the same tension between incarnation and transcendence that runs throughout the book, and emphasizing His dual nature between human fallibility and omnipotent being.

== Reception ==
The novel was widely discussed during the 2019 French literary season. Writing for La Croix, reviewer Dominique Greiner summarized the premise by noting that the reader is plunged directly into the mind of Christ (whom he terms "Le Jésus d'Amélie"), exploring the internal experiences of an intensely human and physical Jesus.

Boasting a print run of 180,000 copies, the novel remained at the top of the Edistat bestseller list for the week of 16-22 September 2019.

At the end of October 2019, Le Figaro reported that Soif topped the bestselling lists for the category of large-format novels alone and was, moreover, the only novel of the rentrée littéraire, France’s autumn literary season, to appear in the GfK/Livres Hebdo top 20 bestselling list.

It was shortlisted by the Academie Française for the Prix Goncourt. It would have been Nothomb's second win of France's most prestigious literary award. She had won the Prix Goncourt for Une forme de vie in 2010. Soif was voted out in the final round by six votes against it to four for it. Award winner was Tous les hommes n'habitent pas le monde de la même façon by Jean-Paul Dubois.

The English translation by Alison Anderson, titled Thirst and published by Europa Editions, received widespread critical acclaim. Jacqueline Snider of the Library Journal called it a "masterpiece," which "combines empathy and longing to create a fully realized characterization, wise beyond words."
