= The Winter Journey (novel) =

2009 novel by Amélie Nothomb

- First edition
- Author: Amélie Nothomb
- Original title: Le Voyage d'Hiver
- Language: French
- Genre: Novel
- Publisher: Albin Michel.
- Publication date: 2009
- Publication place: Belgium
- Pages: 120
- ISBN: 978-2-226-18844-1
- Preceded by: The Prince's Act
- Followed by: Life Form

The Winter Journey (French: Le Voyage d'Hiver) is the 18th novel by the Belgian writer Amélie Nothomb. It appeared on 20 August 2009 published by Éditions Albin Michel.

== Plot ==
In spite of Zoïle's attempts to get rid of the presence of autistic novelist Aliénor Malèze from Astrolabe’s life, her agent and protector, so as to fully live his love for her, the result is a sentimental failure. Zoïle, desperate, drifts into an act of aerial terrorism, by hijacking a Roissy airplane armed with a glass shard from a broken bottle, he wants to crash the plane on the Eiffel Tower.

The title refers to Franz Schubert's lied Winterreise: in the novel, Zoïle thinks about this song cycle to forget about his fear during the terrorist act.
