= Not Everybody Lives the Same Way =

2019 novel by Jean-Paul Dubois

- First edition (French)
- Author: Jean-Paul Dubois
- Audio read by: Jacques Gamblin
- Original title: Tous les hommes n'habitent pas le monde de la même façon
- Translator: David Homel
- Language: French
- Publisher: Éditions de l'Olivier
- Publication date: 14 August 2019
- Publication place: France
- English publication date: 3 February 2022
- Awards: Prix Goncourt (2019)
- ISBN: 978-2-8236-1516-6
- OCLC: 1110042250
- Dewey Decimal: 843/.914
- LC Class: PQ2664.U28435 T68 2019

Not Everybody Lives the Same Way (French: Tous les hommes n'habitent pas le monde de la même façon, lit. 'Not All Men Inhabit the World in the Same Way') is a novel by the French writer Jean-Paul Dubois, published in 2019. An English translation by David Homel was published in 2022 by MacLehose Press (UK) and The Overlook Press (US).

The novel received the 2019 Prix Goncourt.

== Content ==
The novel tells the story of Paul Hansen, who has been incarcerated for two years in the provincial Bordeaux Prison in Montreal, Quebec, Canada.

== Reception ==
On 4 November 2019, the novel received the Prix Goncourt. Dubois won in the second round of voting, with six votes against four for Belgian writer Amélie Nothomb's novel Thirst. Philippe Claudel, one of the jurors of the prize, called the novel a masterpiece, "full of humanity, melancholy, irony." The Agence France-Presse news agency called it "an affecting and nostalgic novel of lost happiness." The French magazine L'Obs called it "basically perfect."

The novel was also awarded the Prix Ginkgo du Livre Audio, for the audio version read by Jacques Gamblin.

== Awards ==
- 2019 Prix Goncourt
- 2020 Prix Ginkgo - Le Livre sur la Place - Ville de Nancy

== See also ==
- 2019 in literature
- Contemporary French literature
