= Fear and Trembling (disambiguation) =

Fear and Trembling is an 1843 philosophical work by Søren Kierkegaard.

Fear and Trembling may also refer to:

- Fear and trembling (biblical phrase), a phrase used throughout the Bible and the Tanakh, and in other Jewish literature
- Fear and Trembling (novel), a 1999 novel by Amélie Nothomb
- Fear and Trembling (film), a 2003 French film based on the novel
- Fear and Trembling (Fargo), a 2015 episode of the American series Fargo
- "Fear and Trembling", a song from the album Go Farther in Lightness by the Australian band Gang of Youths
