= Attentat =

Attentat or Atentat may refer to:

- Attentat (band), Swedish punk band
- Attentat (novel), a 1997 novel by Amélie Nothomb
- Atentát, a 1964 Czech film directed by Jiří Sequens
- Atentat, Ukrainian-language title of the 1995 Ukrainian film Assassination. An Autumn Murder in Munich about the murder of Stepan Bandera
