= Journal d'Hirondelle =

2006 novel by Amélie Nothomb

- First edition (publ. Albin Michel)
- Author: Amélie Nothomb
- Publisher: Albin Michel
- Publication date: August 23, 2006
- ISBN: 978-2-226-17335-5

Journal d'Hirondelle is a 2006 novel by Belgian writer Amélie Nothomb. The book is Nothomb's 15th novel and was first published in 2006 by Éditions Albin Michel.

== Plot summary ==
A young courier suffers a heartbreak. He loses the pleasure of all his senses and emotions. Looking for a way to regain his feelings, he renames himself Urbain and becomes a contract killer. He then succeeds in regaining what he lost.
