= Peplum =

Peplum originates in the Greek word for 'tunic' and may refer to one of the following:

- Sword-and-sandal films, a derogatory reference to the genre of Greco-Roman Era costume/adventure films mostly produced in Italy, also known as "peplum".
- Péplum (novel), a 1996 work by Belgian novelist Amélie Nothomb.
- Peplos, a kind of women's garment in ancient Greece.
- An overskirt also referred to as a peplum
