= Ignaz Kuranda =

Austrian writer and politician (1812–1884)

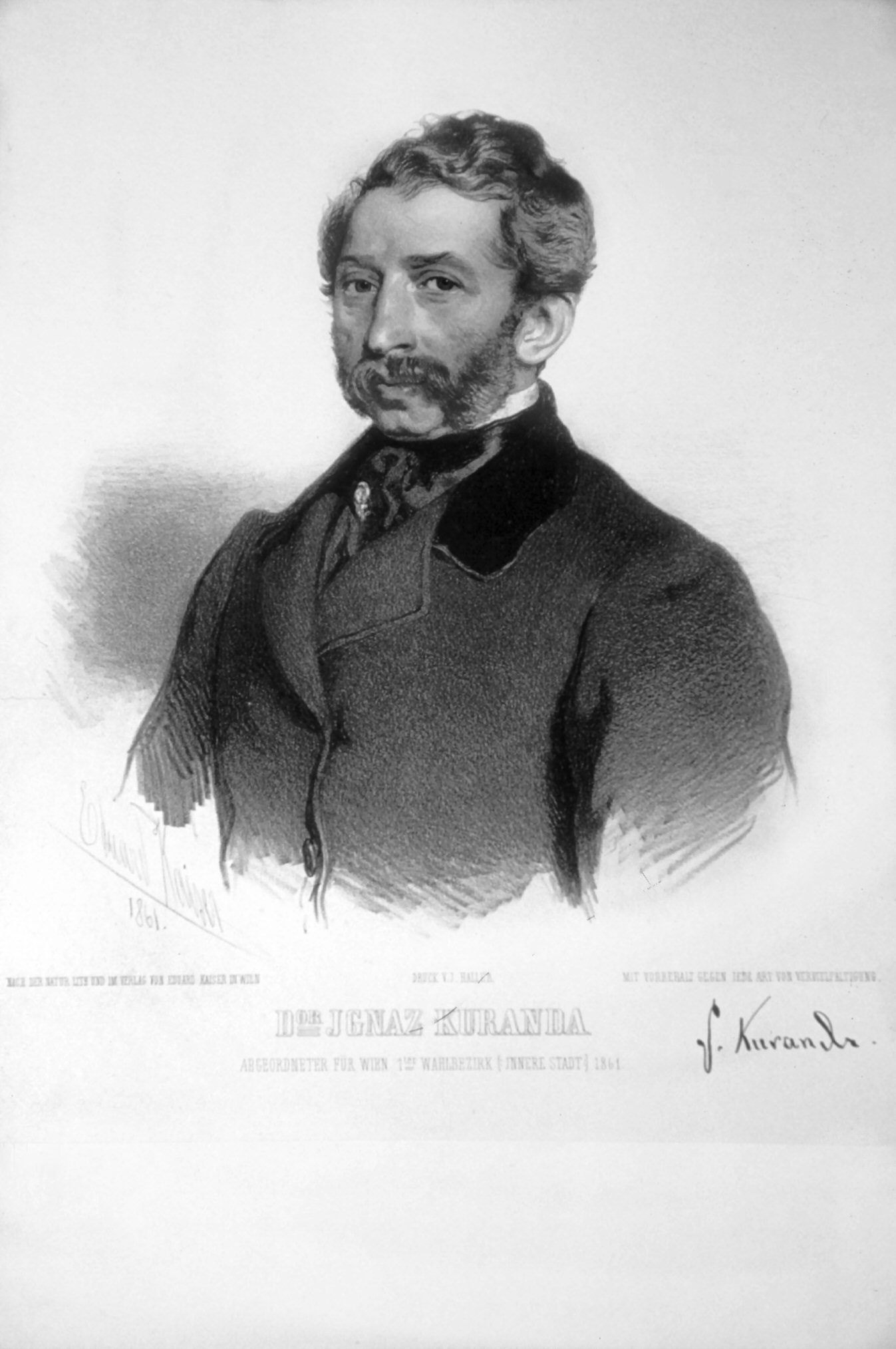
- Ignaz Kuranda

Member of the Reichsrat
- In office 1861–1884

Member of the Landtag of Lower Austria
- In office 20 March 1861 – 1884

Personal details
- Born: 1 May 1812 Prague, Austrian Empire
- Died: 3 April 1884 (aged 71) Vienna, Austria
- Party: Constitutional Party
- Occupation: Writer, politician

Ignaz Kuranda (1 May 1812 – 3 April 1884) was an Austrian deputy and political writer of Bohemian origin.

== Establishes "Die Grenzboten" ==
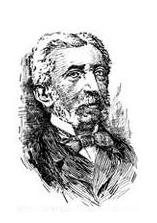

His grandfather and father were dealers in second-hand books. In 1834 he went to Vienna, where he devoted himself to literary work, and wrote the drama Die Letzte Weisse Rose, which was played first in Stuttgart and later in Carlsruhe and Frankfort-on-the-Main, and won great popularity. In 1838 Kuranda went to Stuttgart, where he became acquainted with David Strauss, the author of Das Leben Jesu; with Uhland, and with other Swabian poets. Here, too, for the first time he came into contact with public political life. He then went to Paris and Brussels. In the latter city he attracted attention through lectures on modern German literature. With the assistance of Minister Nothomb and the author Hendrik Conscience he founded in 1841 the periodical Die Grenzboten; but on account of the obstacles which the Prussian government placed in the way of its circulation in Germany, Kuranda removed its headquarters to Leipzig, where it soon became an important factor in Austrian politics. That which no one dared write in Austria was published in Die Grenzboten. Kuranda's work Belgien Seit Seiner Revolution appeared in Leipzig in 1846.

After the outbreak of the movement of 1848 Kuranda went to Vienna, where he was enthusiastically received in literary circles. From Vienna he was delegated to the Fünfziger Ausschuss in Frankfort-on-the-Main, and later he was returned to the German parliament as delegate for Teplitz. Kuranda did not remain long in the Frankfort parliament. In the summer of 1848 he returned to Vienna and established the Ostdeutsche Post, which first appeared on 1 October, and in which he strove to oppose the revolutionary element. After the promulgation of the constitution (the Octroirte Verfassung), which had been forced upon the people, Kuranda had to give up his position as editor of the Ostdeutsche Post. He was placed under police surveillance because he refused to sign an engagement not to write upon politics, and some time elapsed before he could again publish the periodical, which he made the organ of the so-called "Grossdeutsche" liberal party in Austria, and in which he pleaded for the restoration of constitutional conditions.

Kuranda may be regarded as one of the founders of liberal press conditions in Austria. Memorable is his lawsuit with Sebastian Brunner, a Catholic priest and editor of the Kirchenzeitung, which case was tried on 10 May 1860. Kuranda had pointed out in the Oesterreichische Post that Brunner collected material for his accusations against the Jews "from very unclean and suspicious sources, whereby he spread untruthfulness and slander." Brunner pressed a charge of calumny against Kuranda, who, through his able defense, and after a masterful pleading by Johann Berger, was acquitted in terms which implied a condemnation of Brunner's anti-Jewish campaign.

In 1866 Kuranda discontinued the publication of his paper, and devoted all his energies to politics. He fought the absolutist October policy, and assisted, as friend and confidant, the Austrian secretary of state, Schmerling, in drafting the February constitution.

== In parliament ==
On 20 March 1861 Kuranda was sent to the Landtag of Lower Austria as delegate for the district of Vienna, and was subsequently elected to the Reichsrat, retaining his seat in that body for twenty years. On the creation of the Delegations (a kind of common parliament of Hungary and Austria with alternative seats at Budapest and Vienna) he was returned as a member of that body. One of the most distinguished members of parliament, Kuranda was a brilliant orator, and spoke mostly on questions of foreign politics. He was also for many years a member of the city council of Vienna.

In 1881 Kuranda's seventieth birthday was celebrated with great enthusiasm by his political party and by the press; and the city council made him an honorary citizen. The emperor had already in 1867 honored him with the Ritterkreuz des Leopoldordens. Kuranda's great activity as a politician and publicist, which he exercised for twenty-three years as the leader of the German liberal party, was paralleled by his faithful devotion to the Jewish cause, to which he gave a great part of his powers. He was for twelve years president of the Jewish community of Vienna. As vice-president of the Israelitische Allianz zu Wien he promoted the study of Wissenschaft des Judentums (Jewish science and history) in which he took great interest.

== Bibliography ==
- Wurzbach, Biog. Lex. des Kaisertums Oesterreich
- Meyers Konversations-Lexikon
