= Winter Journey =

Winter Journey may refer to:

- Winter Journey (Schubert) or Winterreise, an 1828 song cycle by Franz Schubert
- Winter Journey (2006 film), a German film
- Winter Journey (2013 film), a Russian film
- The Winter Journey (novel), a 2009 novel by Amélie Nothomb
