= The Stranger Next Door =

1973 novel by Amélie Nothomb

- Author: Amélie Nothomb
- Original title: Les catilinaires
- Translator: Carol Volk
- Language: French
- Genre: Novel
- Publication date: 1995
- Publication place: Belgium
- Preceded by: Human Rites
- Followed by: Fear and Trembling

The Stranger Next Door (French: Les Catilinaires) is a Belgian novel by Amélie Nothomb. It was first published in 1995.

== Summary ==
The book begins when a retired couple, Emile and Juliette Hazel, achieve their dream of buying a house in the woods to live alone together, far from the public world.

Nobody lives around the house except an old doctor, Palamède Bernadin, and his wife, Bernadette, in a little house. To be polite, Emile and Juliette decide to meet them, and thus come in contact with Palamède Bernardin, who develops the habit of coming into their house everyday precisely at 4pm, sitting in an armchair and waiting until 6pm, barely saying a word, at which time he, ever punctually, goes back home. The visits become slowly more and more unbearable, until the Hazels resolve to get rid of him.
