= Sulphuric Acid (novel) =

2005 novel by Amélie Nothomb

- First (French) edition
- Author: Amélie Nothomb
- Original title: Acide Sulfurique
- Translator: Shaun Whiteside
- Language: French
- Genre: Novel
- Publisher: Albin Michel
- Publication date: 2005
- Publication place: Belgium
- Media type: print

Sulphuric Acid (French: Acide sulfurique) is a Belgian novel by Amélie Nothomb. It was first published in 2005. It details the thoughts and pursuits of the people involved in a reality show recreating a concentration camp.

== Plot ==
For a TV reality show called Concentration, prisoner-participants are chosen at random from the population and abducted in raids. The living conditions in the camp are deplorable: the prisoners are ill-nourished, insulted, and beaten by the guards (called "Kapos"). Each day, two prisoners are chosen and killed on-camera. Zdena, one of the guards, falls in love with Pannonique, the heroine of the book and a prisoner known in the camp by her identity number CKZ 114. Zdena wants to know Pannonique's real name and she's ready to do anything to find out, going as far as killing prisoners who are close to Pannonique. The media expresses shock, thereby inciting more and more people to watch the series. Concentration reaches a frenzy of scandal when the producers give the public the right to decide which prisoners will be killed in public. The TV audience votes en masse, and more and more people take up watching.

== See also ==
- Stanford prison experiment
