= The Life of Hunger =

2004 novel by Amélie Nothomb

- First (French) edition
- Author: Amélie Nothomb
- Original title: Biographie de la faim
- Language: French
- Genre: Novel
- Publisher: Albin Michel
- Publication date: 2004
- Publication place: France
- Media type: print

The Life of Hunger (French: Biographie de la faim) is a novel by Belgian author Amélie Nothomb. It was first published in 2004.

== Resume ==
"The inhabitants of Vanuatu have never been hungry." They don't know the feelings that hunger causes as everything is within their reach. As a result, they become idle. Amélie exists in a permanent state of starvation. She tries by any means to overcome the emptiness which defines her (see The Character of Rain). She intoxicates herself by observing the World's beauty; the hills beyond her Japanese garden, her sister's beauty, the gentleness of her nanny's hugs, the drunken rush from races, or an internal journey into emptiness. Or simply by filling up with water: Potomania. Amélie is obsessed by hunger. It dominates her life. Can she resist this servitude or will anorexia be her downfall?
