= The Crazymen =

- Origin: Motala, Sweden
- Genres: Punk, progressive metal, instrumental
- Years active: 2001–present
- Labels: Vuv Records, Eden Records, Noise Control Records
- Members: Damir Bodnar; Oscar Nilsson; Marko Kilpeläinen
- Website: Official Site

The Crazymen or Crazymen is a punk metal, instrumental band that started 2001 in Motala, Sweden by Damir Bodnar (alias Mr. Tiger) and Oscar Nilsson (alias Mr. Lightning). In 2002, Marko Kilpeläinen (alias Mr. Rabbit) joined the group and they played their first show together that same year. The band name was inspired by old 1960s garage rock band names like The Trashmen. In 2005, the band got signed to the Swedish independent record label Vuv Records and released their debut single “Your Hate, Old Man”. The band have since released several albums and EPs. on Vuv Records and also on U.K. based labels “Eden Records” and “Noise Control Records”. The band have played live shows with In flames, Skumdum, Attentat etc. and in 2013 they released the record “Beard Restrictions” on Vinyl Lp and digital with Vuv Records. The album received both good and bad reviews from the press and a couple of songs where played by Swedish national radio.

== Members ==
- Damir Bodnar (Mr. Tiger) – drums, vocals, guitar, bas
- Oscar Nilsson (Mr. Lightning)- bass, vocals, guitar, drums
- Marko Kilpeläinen (Mr. Rabbit) – guitar, drums, bas, vocals.

== Discography ==
=== Albums ===
- Rabbit Execution - 2011
- All Rabbits Must Hide - 2012
- Beard Restrictions (For Rabbits Not For Goats) - 2013
- The Question Mark - 2015
- Sveriges Sista Dagar - 2015`
- Forest Punker 5777 - 2017

=== EPs ===
- Banned In Upsala - 2007
- Year 2017, U Understand What We Mean - 2010
- Year 2018, Era Of The New Scene – 2010 (Noise Control Records)
- Raggare O Punkarsvin Uber Alles – 2013
- Shape Of Things To Come – 2020

=== Singles ===
- "Your Hate Old Man” - 2005

=== Demos ===
- Give It All Or Give It Nothing - 2003
- The Crazymen EP - 2004
- Punk For Rabbits, Humans Dare To Listen - 2004

=== Compilations ===
- Punk For Rabbits Vol.2, Demos, Live, Studio 2004-2011 (Eden Records 2010)
- Vuv Records Sampler Vol.1 - 2013
- Vuv Records Sampler Vol.2 - 2014
- Vuv Records Sampler Vol.2 - 2015

== Biography ==
- I Gud och humorns tjänst, 15 år av galenskap - 2017 (197 page book)
