= Tokyo Fiancée =

Novel by Amélie Nothomb

- First edition
- Author: Amélie Nothomb
- Original title: Ni d'Ève ni d'Adam
- Translator: Alison Anderson
- Language: French
- Genre: Novel
- Publisher: Albin Michel
- Publication date: 2007
- Publication place: Belgium
- Pages: 238
- ISBN: 978-2-226-17964-7

Tokyo Fiancée (French: Ni d'Ève ni d'Adam "Neither Eve nor Adam") is an autobiographical novel by the Belgian writer Amélie Nothomb. It appeared on 20 August 2007 published by Éditions Albin Michel, with a film adaptation being released in 2014.

The novel is partially concurrent with Nothomb's earlier novel, Fear and Trembling.

== Plot ==
Amélie, a Belgian woman born in Japan, returns to her childhood home of Tokyo and dreams of living there. Amélie believes that the most effective way to learn Japanese is to teach French, so she meets Rinri, a sophomore studying French. The two become friends and lovers as they go from teacher to student.

The couple experience cultural differences. Amélie likes to taste Japanese food, while Rinri likes Western food. He prepares Japanese food for Amélie, but does not eat it himself. The Japanese things that Amélie admires are of no interest to Rinri. Rinri takes Amélie back to her memories of Japan. Amélie's Japanese improves rapidly thanks to Rinri, and so does Rinri's French.

When Rinri proposes to Amélie, she accepts but feels uncertain about how she feels about him. Instead of going through with the marriage, Amélie returns to Europe when her employment contract with Yumimoto ends and does not contact Rinri. Many years later, she returns to Japan to promote her latest book. She is reunited with Rinri at a book signing, where she greets him as a long-lost brother.

== Awards ==
The novel was nominated for the Prix Goncourt in 2007 and the Prix Renaudot 2007. It won Prix de Flore in 2007.

== Press ==
- 30 May 2009 Lotus Reads: "a contemporary love story, where the woman's love of independence trumps her desire to be loved and needed."
- 5 May 2009 Raintaxi: "Nothomb offers no false resolution of the novel’s conflict between personal freedom and emotional intimacy, and this unresolved tension makes Tokyo Fiancée convincing and compelling."
- 19 February 2009 The Asian Review of Books: "Tokyo Fiancee is sparse, sardonic, intelligent, cross-culturally aware, simultaneously detached and engage"
- 19 February 2009 The Temple News: "Tokyo Fiancée is either a love story about language or a language story about love."
- 15 February 2009 Metropolis (Japan): "Nothomb skillfully uses the pair’s language exchange and intercultural relationship to offer deep insights into, and make sharp comments on, Japanese traditional culture and Bubble Era society."

== Adaptations ==
Tokyo Fiancée was adapted to the cinema in 2015 by Stefan Liberski. Amélie is played by the Belgian actress Pauline Étienne.
