= A Perfect Enemy =

- Film poster
- Directed by: Kike Maíllo
- Written by: Cristina Clemente; Kike Maíllo; Fernando Navarro
- Based on: The Enemy's Cosmetique by Amélie Nothomb
- Produced by: Wolfgang Mueller; Benito Mueller; Eric Tostorff; Justin Nappi; Genny Goudard; Daniel Goroshko; Rodolphe Sanzé; Laurent Fumeron; Toni Carrizosa; Ana Eiras
- Starring: Tomasz Kot; Athena Strates; Marta Nieto; Dominique Pinon
- Cinematography: Rita Noriega
- Edited by: Martí Roca
- Music by: Alex Baranowski
- Production companies: Sábado Películas; Barry Films; The Project; Hessen-Invest Film
- Release dates: 16 October 2020 (Sitges); 29 January 2021 (Filmin)
- Countries: Spain; Germany; France
- Language: English

A Perfect Enemy is a 2020 psychological thriller directed by Kike Maíllo based on Amélie Nothomb's novel The Enemy's Cosmetique. The film is a Spanish-German-French international co-production starring Tomasz Kot and Athena Strates alongside Marta Nieto and Dominique Pinon.

== Plot ==
Successful architect Jeremiasz Angust is on a business trip to Paris. While waiting for his flight, he meets a mysterious woman named Texel Textor and strikes up a conversation with her. However, their conversation takes an unexpected turn when Texel accuses Jeremiasz of something that he claims he has no idea about.

Jeremiasz boards his flight and forgets all about the unsettling encounter with Texel, until he meets her again on the flight home to Warsaw This time, she claims that he is a murderer and has evidence to back it up. Jeremiasz is taken aback and denies any involvement in any crime. But Texel is adamant and even takes him to the crime scene, which looks exactly like the one she described.

As Jeremiasz tries to prove his innocence, he is drawn deeper into Texel's game, which seems to have no end. He realizes that Texel is not who she appears to be and has a hidden agenda of her own. As the two engage in a dangerous cat-and-mouse game, Jeremiasz's life is turned upside down and he begins to question his own sanity.

In the end, the shocking truth is revealed, and Jeremiasz and Texel's fates are sealed in an unexpected way.

== Cast ==
- Tomasz Kot as Jeremiasz Angust
- Athena Strates as Texel Textor
- Marta Nieto as Isabelle
- Dominique Pinon as Jean Rosen
- Freyja Simpson as Feline
- Janosh Hetzel as Frank Hoffmann

== Production ==
The film is a Spanish-German-French co-production by Sábado Películas, Barry Films, The Project, and Hessen-Invest Film.

== Release ==
The film was presented at the 53rd Sitges Film Festival on 16 October 2020. It was released on Filmin streaming on 29 January 2021, reportedly becoming the largest release on the platform up to that date.

== Reception ==
According to the review aggregation website Rotten Tomatoes, A Perfect Enemy has an 87% approval rating based on 15 reviews from critics, with an average rating of 6.0/10.

Phil Hoad of The Guardian rated the film 3 out of 5 stars, deeming it to be a "well-written, devious Euro-thriller".

Sergio F. Pinilla of Cinemanía rated the film 3 out of 5 stars, considering that the story "works", with the viewer feeling "trapped in the waiting room of that airport, at the mercy of the lurking and morbid tales of a stranger", summing up the film as a "psychothriller that relates perfection with (self-)destruction".

== See also ==
- List of Spanish films of 2021
