= Loving Sabotage =

1993 novel by Amélie Nothomb

- Author: Amélie Nothomb
- Original title: Le Sabotage amoureux
- Translator: Andrew Wilson
- Language: English translated from French
- Genre: Novel
- Publication date: 1993
- Publication place: France
- Media type: print
- Preceded by: Hygiene and the Assassin
- Followed by: Human Rites

Loving Sabotage (French: Le Sabotage amoureux) is a Belgian novel by Amélie Nothomb. It was first published in 1993 by the Albin Michel.

== Plot ==
The narrator of Loving Sabotage is a five-year-old girl who arrives in Beijing in 1972 as the daughter of a Belgian diplomat. She joins the other children in the diplomatic enclave, engaged in various nasty wars. She owns a bicycle, which she has convinced herself is a horse. She falls madly in love with a six-year-old Italian girl and attempts to gain the affections of cruel Elena.

Based in part by Nothomb's own childhood experience in Beijing, the novel includes observations of China under the Gang of Four and on the way Westerners perceived China.
