= Human Rites =

Play by Amélie Nothomb

Human rites
- French language original title Les Combustibles (1994)
- Author: Amélie Nothomb
- Original title: Les Combustibles
- Translator: Andrew Wilson
- Language: English translated from French
- Genre: Play
- Publication date: 1994
- Publication place: France
- Media type: print
- Preceded by: Loving Sabotage
- Followed by: The Stranger Next Door

Human Rites (French: Les Combustibles) is a Belgian play by Amélie Nothomb. It was first published in 1994. It is set in an eastern city under siege. The play has been adapted for stage and performed as an opera.

== Characters ==
The play has only three characters:

- Daniel: an idealist and dreamer, assistant professor.
- Marina: "soul mate" of Daniel, Marina completed her university studies. . Very eccentric, lucid, she believes to have "fallen into hell"
- Professor: impudent, insolent
