= The Character of Rain =

2000 short novel by Amélie Nothomb

- First edition
- Author: Amélie Nothomb
- Original title: Métaphysique des tubes
- Translator: Timothy Bent
- Language: French
- Genre: Novel
- Publisher: Éditions Albin Michel
- Publication date: 2000
- Publication place: France
- English publication date: 2002
- Media type: print
- Pages: 171
- ISBN: 978-0312302481

The Character of Rain (French: Métaphysique des tubes) is a 2000 short novel by the Belgian author Amélie Nothomb originally written in French. The English translated edition of the novel was published by Faber and Faber.

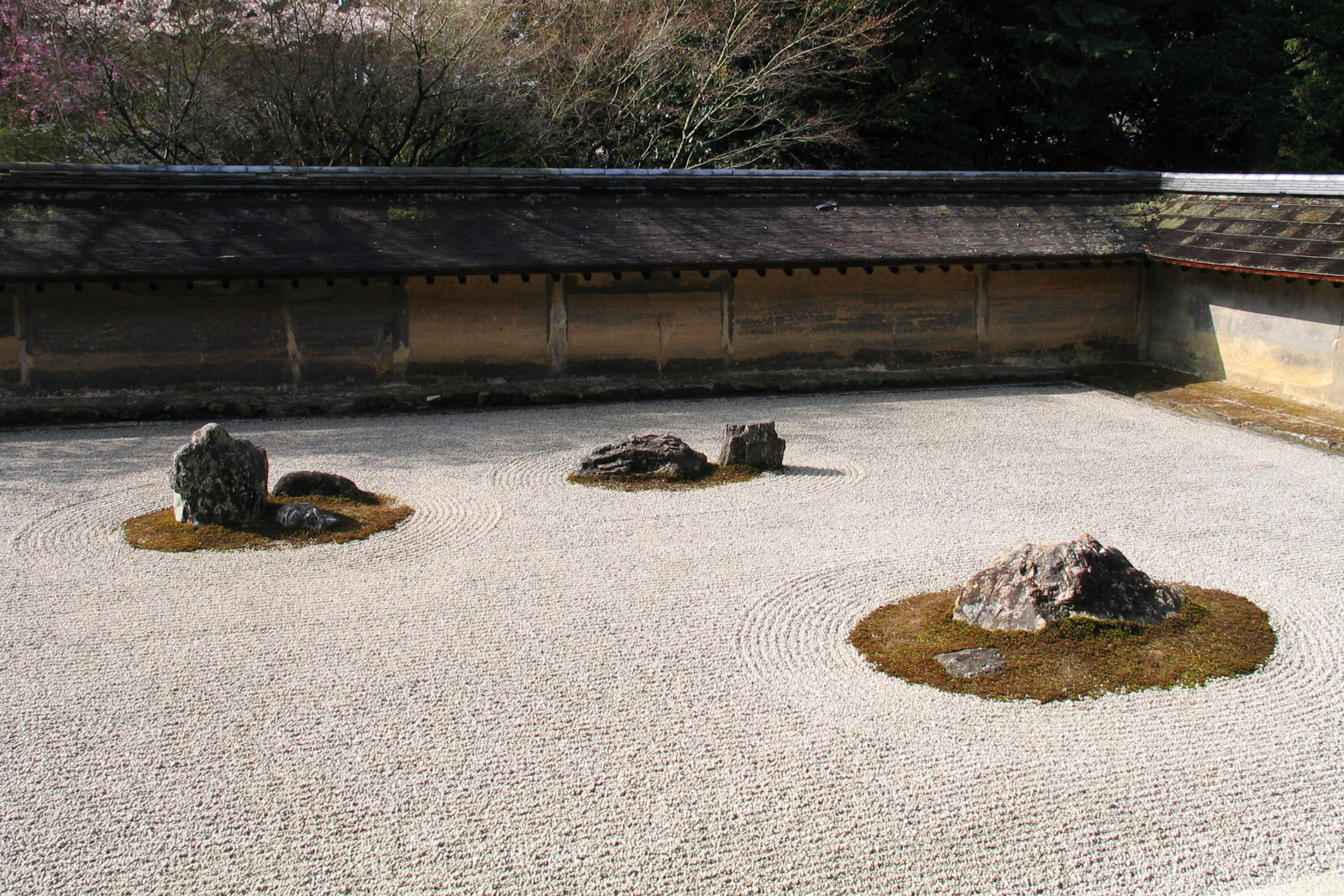
The zen gardens that fascinate Amélie

== Plot ==
The novel describes the world as discovered and seen by a three-year-old child born in Japan to a Belgian family.

The narrator of the novel has spent the first two and a half years of her life in a nearly vegetative state until she is jolted out of her plant-like, tube-like state, and gains a peculiar but complete awareness of the world around her. Her parents see how their 'plant' becomes a child and discover that she can move. Their enthusiasm does not last long though, because their daughter is now very active. She screams all day and gets tantrums as if she must catch up on the time she lost as a 'plant'. Only when she discovers the existence of pleasure by eating white chocolate she comes to a quiet.

Most fascinating to the narrator is the discovery of water in oceans, seas, pools, puddles, streams, ponds, and rain - one meaning of the Japanese character for her name and a symbol of her amphibious life. She also discovers the language, Japanese, a pond with carps, time, and death. This discovery despairs her to the point of attempting suicide, but she is rescued from drowning in the pond.

== Adaptations ==
Little Amélie or the Character of Rain (Amélie et la métaphysique des tubes), an animated adaptation of the novel by Maïlys Vallade and Liane-Cho Han, was released in 2025.
