= Fear and Trembling (novel) =

1999 novel by Amélie Nothomb

- 1999 French edition
- Author: Amélie Nothomb
- Original title: Stupeur et tremblements
- Translator: Adriana Hunter
- Language: French
- Genre: Novel
- Publisher: Éditions Albin Michel
- Publication date: 1999
- Publication place: Belgium
- Media type: Print
- Pages: 174
- ISBN: 2-226-10950-1

Fear and Trembling (original title: Stupeur et tremblements, which means "Stupefaction and trembling") is a satirical novel by Amélie Nothomb, first published in 1999, and translated into English by Adriana Hunter in 2001. It was awarded the Grand Prix du roman de l'Académie française that year. It was adapted into the film Fear and Trembling in 2003.

The novel is partially concurrent with Nothomb's later novel, Tokyo Fiancée.

== Plot ==
Amélie, a young Belgian woman who spent the first five years of her life in Japan, returns to Japan as a young adult, signing a one-year contract as a translator at the prestigious company Yumimoto. Through a series of comical cultural misunderstandings, Amélie, who begins at the bottom of the corporate ladder, manages to descend even lower. During her time at Yumimoto, she is the direct subordinate of Fubuki Mori, whose friendly demeanor quickly disappears when Amélie unwittingly oversteps herself.

Bored and frustrated with how she is apparently not assigned to do anything productive, Amélie tries to take the initiative by memorizing the company's list of employees and delivering the mail, only to be reprimanded for "stealing someone else's job." When she is assigned to photocopy the departmental manager's documents, which she discovers are the rules to his golf club, Amelie is forced to redo her work when the manager returns it with the complaint that the copies are off-centre and that she must not use the feeder for the copier. While she is redoing the task, the kindly Mr. Tenshi takes notice of her and asks for her help in drafting a report about the new method of manufacturing reduced-fat butter developed in Belgium. Amélie's contributions to Mr. Tenshi's report make it a big success and she requests not to be given credit. Though it seems her transfer to Mr. Tenshi's department is imminent, Fubuki feels offended as this constitutes a violation of the company's hierarchy and she exposes everything to the vice-president, who severely scolds Mr. Tenshi and Amélie, and sees to it that Amélie writes no more reports and strictly sticks to doing duties assigned by Ms. Mori.

Although advised by Mr. Tenshi not to do so, Amélie decides to confront Ms. Mori and talk to her personally. This encounter can be seen as the main juncture of the novel, as both characters feel the other should apologise, but at the same time each of them fails to recognise why she herself should do the same.

The main difference is that while Amélie feels her progress in her career from useless work to the place where she actually can use her skills has been hindered for no other reason than maliciousness, Ms Mori interprets Amélie's move as being against her as Amélie was trying to pass her by, thus violating the correct hierarchy. Ms Mori had to suffer and work hard for years to achieve her position and it was inconceivable to her to imagine that Amélie might achieve the same level of hierarchy within only a couple of weeks.

From that point on, the relationship between them changes from a fairly good one (which, though, only Amélie would describe as 'friendship') to animosity, although still accompanied by respect and admiration from Amélie's side, which Ms Mori either fails to notice or chooses to ignore.

Amélie proves herself useless at the tasks she is subsequently asked to do in the Accounts Department, as she apparently has dyscalculia to some extent, while Ms Mori thinks Amélie is making mistakes on purpose to sabotage the company and the manager herself.

Another dialogue reveals the differences between the different concepts of responsibility in Japanese and Western cultures. While for Ms Mori the manager is directly responsible for the mistakes of their staff (You made the mistakes deliberately only to expose me to the public ridicule), Amélie thinks everybody is responsible for their own mistakes (I ridiculed only myself, not you).

The biggest mistake Amélie commits comes after Ms Mori has been severely abused by the vice-president in front of all the department. When Ms Mori, not having shown tears to her colleagues, goes to the bathroom to let her feelings out in private, Amélie follows her to console her. While from Amélie's point of view Ms Mori is not in a shameful position and offering a consolation like that is only a kind-hearted gesture, Ms Mori feels utterly ashamed to be seen showing her feelings and misunderstands Amélie's following her as vengefulness and hostility.

The next day Amélie is assigned the job of a bathroom cleaner by Ms Mori. With six more months of her one-year contract to go, Amélie decides to endure until the end, which might be shameful from the Western point of view, but from the Japanese point of view means not losing face.

After her contract finishes in January 1991, she returns to Belgium and starts publishing: her first novel Hygiène de l'assassin appearing in 1992, she receives a brief congratulation note from Ms Mori in 1993.

== Explanation of title ==
According to the novel, in Japan, protocol states that in the presence of the Emperor, who until 1947 had been considered a living god, a person must demonstrate his or her reverence with fear and trembling, though most Japanese citizens today are unaware of this injunction.

== Adaptation ==
- Fear and Trembling, a film from 2003.

== Publication details ==
- Stupeur et tremblements, Éditions Albin Michel, 1999. ISBN 2-226-10950-1
- Stupeur et tremblements, Livre de Poche, 2001. ISBN 2-253-15071-1
