= Charles-Ferdinand Nothomb =

Belgian politician (1936–2023)

Baron Charles-Ferdinand Nothomb
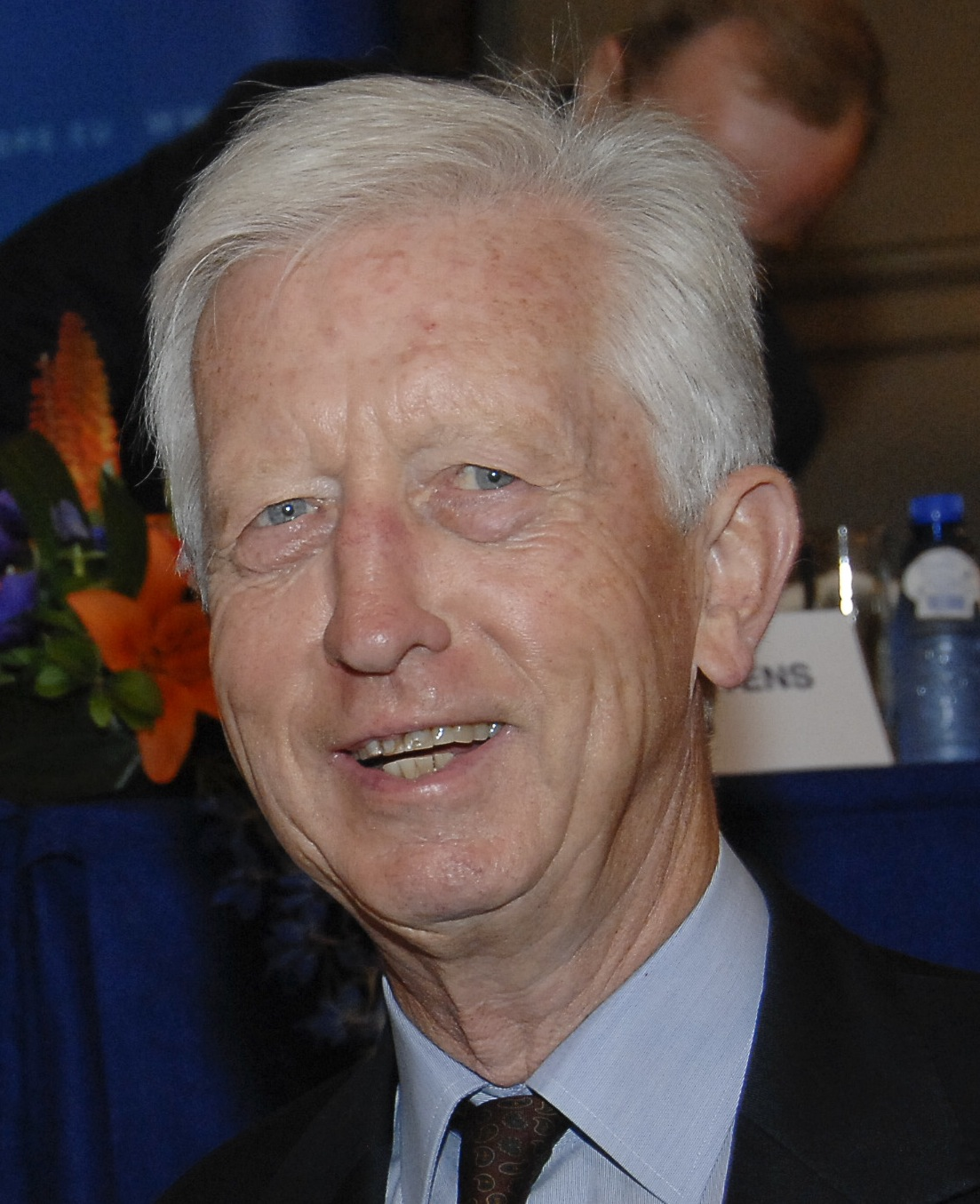

President of the Chamber of Representatives
- In office 10 May 1988 – 8 June 1995
- Preceded by: Erik Vankeirsbilck
- Succeeded by: Jos Dupré
- In office 3 April 1979 – 20 May 1980
- Preceded by: Edmond Leburton
- Succeeded by: Jean Defraigne

Personal details
- Born: 3 May 1936 Brussels, Belgium
- Died: 19 April 2023 (aged 86)
- Party: Humanist Democratic Centre

Baron Charles-Ferdinand Nicolas Marie Pierre Nothomb (3 May 1936 – 19 April 2023) was a Belgian politician.

== Family and early life ==
Nothomb was born in Brussels in 1936, the thirteenth and youngest child of the writer and politician Pierre Nothomb, and grew up in Habay in the province of Luxembourg. He was descended from Jean-Baptiste Nothomb, who served as Prime Minister of Belgium in the 1840s. In 1963 he married Michèle Pouppez de Kettenis de Hollaeken Dryepondt (born 1941), with whom he had three children, and was awarded the title of Baron three years later.

Nothomb's older brother was Jean-François Nothomb, a leader of the Comet Escape Line during World War II. He was an uncle of the diplomat Baron Patrick Nothomb and the politician François Roelants du Vivier and a great-uncle of the writers Juliette and Amélie Nothomb.

Having obtained degrees in law (1957) and economic sciences (1958), Nothomb was a teacher and researcher at the Catholic University of Louvain and other higher education establishments, and was also involved in the Christian Social Party youth movement.

== Political career ==
Nothomb was elected to the national Chamber of Representatives in 1968 to represent the constituency of Arlon-Marche-Bastogne, a seat he held until 1995.

He was president of the Humanist Democratic Centre party from 1972 to 1979 and president of the Chamber of Representatives from 1979 to 1980. Having served as a Member of the European Parliament from 1979 to 1980, he was Minister for Foreign Affairs from 1980 to 1981 and Minister of the Interior from 1981 to 1986. From 1988 to 1995 he served again as president of the Chamber of Representatives.

Upon his retirement from the Chamber in 1995, Nothomb served a four-year term in the Senate (1995−1999) and was again president of the Humanist Democratic Centre party from 1996 to 1999. From 2002 until his death he was Vice-President of European Movement.

Nothomb was also the author of several political and historical works.

He died on 19 April 2023, at the age of 86.

== Honours ==
Nothomb was awarded the following decorations:

=== National honours ===
- Belgium:
  - 1995: Minister of State, By Royal Decree of HM King Albert II.
  - 1995: Grand Cross of the Order of the Crown.
  - 1991: Grand Cross of the Order of Leopold II
  - 1987: Grand Officer of the Order of Leopold
  - 1985: Civic Medal, 1st Class
- Belgian nobility: title of Baron

=== Foreign honours ===
- France: Grand Officier of the Legion of Honour (20 February 1984)
- Gabon: Grand Cross of the National Order of Merit (Gabon) (14 January 1982)
- Greece: Grand Cross of the Order of Honour (3 April 1982)
- Iceland: Knights Grand Cross of the Order of the Falcon (16 October 1979)
- Italy: Knight Grand Cross of the Order of Merit of the Italian Republic
- Mexico: Grand Cross of the Order of the Aztec Eagle
- Netherlands: Knight Grand Cross of the Order of Orange-Nassau (4 September 1980)
- Poland: Grand Cross of the Order of Merit of the Republic of Poland (24 September 1979)

Party political offices
Preceded by Gérard Deprez	Chairman of the Humanist Democratic Centre; 1996–1998	Succeeded by Philippe Maystadt
Political offices
Preceded by Edmond Leburton	President of the Chamber of Representatives; 1979–1980	Succeeded by Jean Defraigne
Preceded by Henri Simonet	Minister of Foreign Affairs; 1980–1981	Succeeded by Leo Tindemans
Preceded by Philippe Busquin	Minister of the Interior; 1981–1986	Succeeded by Joseph Michel
Preceded by Erik Vankeirsbilck	President of the Chamber of Representatives; 1988–1995	Succeeded by Jos Dupré
