= Sebastian Brunner =

Austrian Catholic writer (1814–1893)

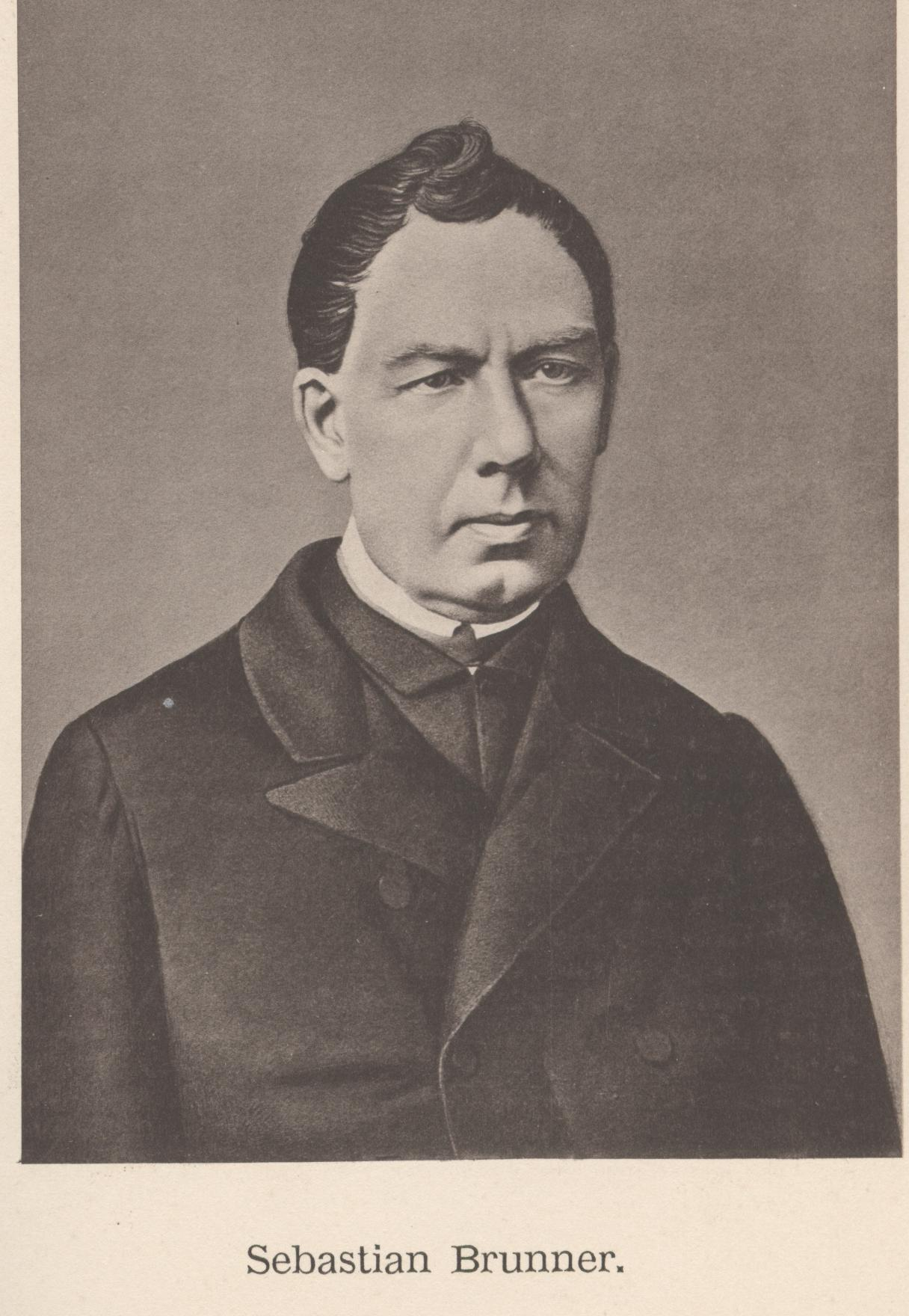
Sebastian Brunner

Sebastian Brunner (10 December 1814 – 27 November 1893) was an Austrian Catholic writer.

He was born in Vienna, and received his college education from the Benedictines of his native city. He received his philosophical and theological training at the Vienna University, was ordained priest in 1838, and was for some years professor in the philosophical faculty of the Vienna University. The University of Freiburg honored him with the degree of Doctor of Theology. In the revolutionary year, 1848, he founded the Wiener Kirchenzeitung, which he edited until 1865, and in which he satirised what he saw as the Josephinist bondage of the Church. He wrote some ascetical books and many volumes of sermons, also a biography of Clemens Maria Hofbauer, the patron saint of Vienna. Some of his writings in the Kirchenzeitung were described as antisemitic, and this was the subject of libel cases which he launched against Ignaz Kuranda and Heinrich Graetz.

His books of travel dealing with Germany, France, England, Switzerland, and especially Italy, include observations on men and manners, art and culture, and most of all on religion, and are thus connected closely with his apologetic and controversial writings. Among the latter may be mentioned his book on The Atheist Renan and his Gospel. Brunner's voluminous historical works include some on the history of the Church in Austria. His humorous works were composed partly in verse, and partly in the form of prose stories. An example of the former is Der Nebeljungen Lied; of the latter, Die Prinzenschule zu Möpselglück. A collection of his stories in prose and verse was published in eighteen volumes in Regensburg in 1864. In his later years he turned his satirical pen against what he saw as the undiscriminating worship of modern German literary celebrities. He died in Vienna.
