= The Prince's Act =

2008 novel by Amélie Nothomb

- First edition
- Author: Amélie Nothomb
- Original title: Le Fait du prince
- Language: French
- Genre: Novel
- Publisher: Albin Michel
- Publication date: 2008
- Publication place: France
- Pages: 180
- ISBN: 978-2-226-18844-1
- LC Class: PQ2674.O778 F35 2008

The Prince's Act (French: Le Fait du prince) is the 17th novel by Belgian writer Amélie Nothomb. It appeared on 20 August 2008 published by Éditions Albin Michel.

== Plot ==
A man steals an unknown person's identity. «There is a moment, between fifteenth and sixteenth sip of champagne, where every man is an aristocrat».
