= Antichrista =

2003 novel by Amélie Nothomb

- First (French) edition
- Author: Amélie Nothomb
- Original title: Antéchrista
- Language: French
- Genre: Novel
- Publisher: Albin Michel
- Publication date: 2003
- Publication place: Belgium
- English publication date: 2005
- Media type: print
- ISBN: 0-571-22483-0

Antichrista (French: Antéchrista) is a Belgian novel by Amélie Nothomb. It was first published by Éditions Albin Michel in 2003 in France. It was translated into English in 2005.

== Plot ==
The novel is about two female students, called Blanche and Christa.

Blanche (French: white, here: "ingénue"), a shy, inconspicuous and retiring girl, gets to know Christa at the University of Brussels and they become friends. Christa is the first real friend in Blanche's life and that is why in the beginning she is very excited and nervous about their friendship. It turns out that Christa is the exact counterpart of Blanche: she is talented, brilliant and above all extremely popular. But it does not take Blanche long to figure out that Christa plays false and loose with her and slowly becomes her "headsman", the Antichrist. Therefore, Blanche has to overcome her trepidation and anxiety to get away from the "Antichrista" and save her family from an "apocalypse".

== Chronology ==
Week	Chronology	Plot
1	First day	Blanche notices Christa's smile
2	One week later	Christa looks at Blanche
2	The following day (Monday)	Christa talks to Blanche
2	Tuesday	Christa is tired
2	The following day (Wednesday)	Blanche invites Christa to her home
3	Monday	Christa visits Blanche: torture and meeting with the parents
3	The following morning (Tuesday)	Return to university; evening: Blanche practices Christa's gymnastic exercises
3	The following day (Wednesday)	Blanche feels lonely
4	The next Monday	Christa is received enthusiastically by Blanche's parents (Champagne)
4	A few days later	Christa introduces Blanche to her friends
5	Monday night	Blanche asks questions about Detlev and thinks about their friendship
6	The next Monday	Christa neither shows up at university nor at the flat of the Hasts; Blanche's parents are worried
6	The following day	Christa shows up at university again
7	The subsequent Monday	Blanche loses her parents; they propose to Christa to stay with them the whole week
7	Wednesday afternoon	Christa moves in
7	Later at university	Christa's self-display; Blanche's inner strength
7	In November	Christa and Blanche go out: "Antichrista"
7	In this night	Blanche's interiour dialogue
8	During several days	Blanche ignores her intruder;
Nov/Dec	The weekends were my liberation	Blanche profits from her loneliness by reading all the time
Nov/Dec	When Christa is back, which means Sunday evening to Friday afternoon	Christa petrifies Blanche; the Antichrista gains ground
Nov/Dec	During the week	Christa takes Blanche out to many parties
Nov/Dec	During the week	The "adventure" with Sabine
Dec	In December	The exams: Blanche has a better grade in philosophy
Dec	During the Christmas break	Christa goes home; Blanche enjoys two weeks of freedom
Dec	During the Christmas break	The visit at aunt Ursula's home
Dec	New Year's Eve	Blanches parents think about Christa
Jan	The evening of the 5th January	They eat the "cake of the Twelfth Night": the apocalypse is close
Jan	Three days a week	Blanches parents invite guests to dinner to introduce Christa to them; they make fun of Blanche despite her presence
Feb	Holidays	Christa goes home
Feb	The day after Christa's departure	Blanche goes to Malmedy ("mal me dit"- "I am told bad things") for one day
Feb	On the second day of the holidays	Blanche shows the "proof" to her parents
Feb	Sunday evening	Private conversation of the family Hast with Christa; Christa packs her belongings
In spring	One day...	Short conversation between Christa and Blanche at university
In spring	A few days later	The letter from Mr. Bildung
In spring	One morning	A friend of Christa spits in Blanche's face
In spring	Later	Insulting letters from Detlev and Christa's mother
In spring	Later	University life becomes difficult for Blanche
In spring	The evening before the Easter break	Blanche arrives too late in a lecture: a Hollywood-style kiss for Christa
In spring	Two weeks later	The lectures continue – without Christa
Jun	Time passes	Blanche fails her exams, her parents go on holidays, she stays at home all alone
Aug	On the 13th August	Blanche's 17th birthday, no party, not a single call; Blanche practices Christa's gymnastic exercises without wanting to do so

In terms of the dynamics of the time structure, there are increasingly dramatic leaps in time; at the beginning, the action is told from day to day, whereas later in weekly steps (from Monday to Monday) and finally towards the end of the novel in monthly time intervals.

== Blanche and Christa ==
The two main characters of the story are named Blanche and Christa. Blanche is a shy and reclusive 16-year-old girl. She is ashamed of her difficulties in approaching other persons (especially such of her own age). Christa represents the opposite of Blanche. She is also 16 years old and comes from Malmedy in the East of Belgium. Christa speaks German, laughs frequently and is very outgoing.

== Christian symbols in the novel ==
None of the characters in this novel has a connection to or affinity for the Christian religion. Neither Blanche nor her parents nor Christa are practicing Christians. Nonetheless, they use Christian metaphors, parables and symbols, e.g. the Parable of the Prodigal Son, the Epiphany, Antichrist, Apocalypse, Kiss of Judas, and Crucifixion. The references and parallels to Christian confession have lost their religious meaning in this novel and are associated with a negative connotation: Christa recklessly exploits the Parable of the Prodigal Son to distinguish herself. The Epiphany is debased to a farce. Christa is labeled "Antichrista" by Blanche because of her vicious intrigues. Christa's satanic manipulations within the microcosm of the Hast family reaches an apocalyptic scale. The Kiss of Judas aids uncovering Christa's maliciousness. The Crucifixion serves as an illustration for Blanche's inner disunity.
