= Tokyo Fiancée (film) =

2014 film

- Film poster
- Directed by: Stefan Liberski
- Written by: Stefan Liberski
- Based on: Tokyo Fiancée by Amélie Nothomb
- Produced by: Jacques-Henri Bronckart; Olivier Bronckart
- Starring: Pauline Étienne; Taichi Inoue; Julie Le Breton
- Cinematography: Hichame Alaouié
- Edited by: Frédérique Broos
- Music by: Casimir Liberski
- Distributed by: O'Brother Distribution
- Release dates: 7 September 2014 (TIFF); 8 October 2014 (Belgium)
- Running time: 100 minutes
- Country: Belgium
- Languages: French; Japanese; English
- Budget: €3.1 million
- Box office: $167,230

Tokyo Fiancée is a 2014 Belgian romance-drama film written and directed by Stefan Liberski. It is based on Amélie Nothomb's 2007 autographical novel of the same name. The movie tells the story of a 21-year-old Belgian woman, Amélie (Pauline Étienne), who has a romance with Rinri (Taichi Inoue), a young Japanese man in Tokyo. She met him when she offered French language tutoring services through a bulletin board. It was selected to be screened in the Contemporary World Cinema section at the 2014 Toronto International Film Festival. It received three nominations at the 5th Magritte Awards.

== Plot ==
Amélie (Pauline Étienne) is a Japanese-born Belgian woman who left Japan at the age of five with her parents and returned to Belgium. At the age of 20, she decided to return to Japan to reconnect with the Japanese culture. She moves to a small apartment in Tokyo. To make a living, she puts up a small poster offering French language tutoring. A young man, Rinri (Taichi Inoue), is interested by the offer and starts taking language lessons with her. Rinri also invites her to a party, where she met Yasmine (Alice de Lencquesaing) and Christine (Julie Le Breton). Amélie also met Rinri's parents at his house.

The two quickly become romantically involved. Rinri helps her to further learn about Japanese culture and language by taking her to the theatre, restaurants, and other places. She also took a trip to the woods near Mount Fuji alone, where she gets lost and survives a cold night in a remote cabin. In a gathering with Rinri's friend, it is revealed that Rinri is part of a Francophile community.

Rinri and Amélie took a trip to Sado Island. There Rinri proposes marriage to Amélie, she declined but proposes an engagement instead. She got accepted for a job at a Japanese company, but she is not happy with the job.

Not long after, the 2011 Tōhoku earthquake and tsunami devastate Japan, causing major damage and loss of life. Her neighbours, Yasmine, and Rinri told her that she must return to Europe, as the disaster is for the Japanese people to deal with. Rinri's father got her a plane ticket to Europe, and she returns there. In a narration, she says that she never saw Rinri again and that she heard that he had married a Frenchwoman, a general's daughter. As for her, she'll keep that for another time.

== Cast ==
- Pauline Étienne as Amélie
- Taichi Inoue as Rinri
- Julie Le Breton as Christine
- Alice de Lencquesaing as Yasmine
- Akimi Ota as Hara
- Hiroki Kageyama as Hiroki
