= Péplum =

Péplum is a novel written in French by the Belgian author Amélie Nothomb. It was first published in 1996 by Éditions Albin Michel.

The futuristic novel is presented as an autobiography. A young writer named A.N. is brought to a hospital for a minor operation. When she wakes up, she finds herself in an unfamiliar room that is very different from her hospital room. She then meets Celsius, a mysterious scientist who explains that 585 years have passed since her surgery and that the year is now 2580.

A dialogue takes place between the young novelist and the scientist from the future. During their conversation, they discuss various topics including the scarcity of energy resources, political systems, classical authors, philosophy, and "the great war of the twenty-second century".
