= Patrick Nothomb =

Belgian diplomat (1936–2020)

Baron Patrick Nothomb
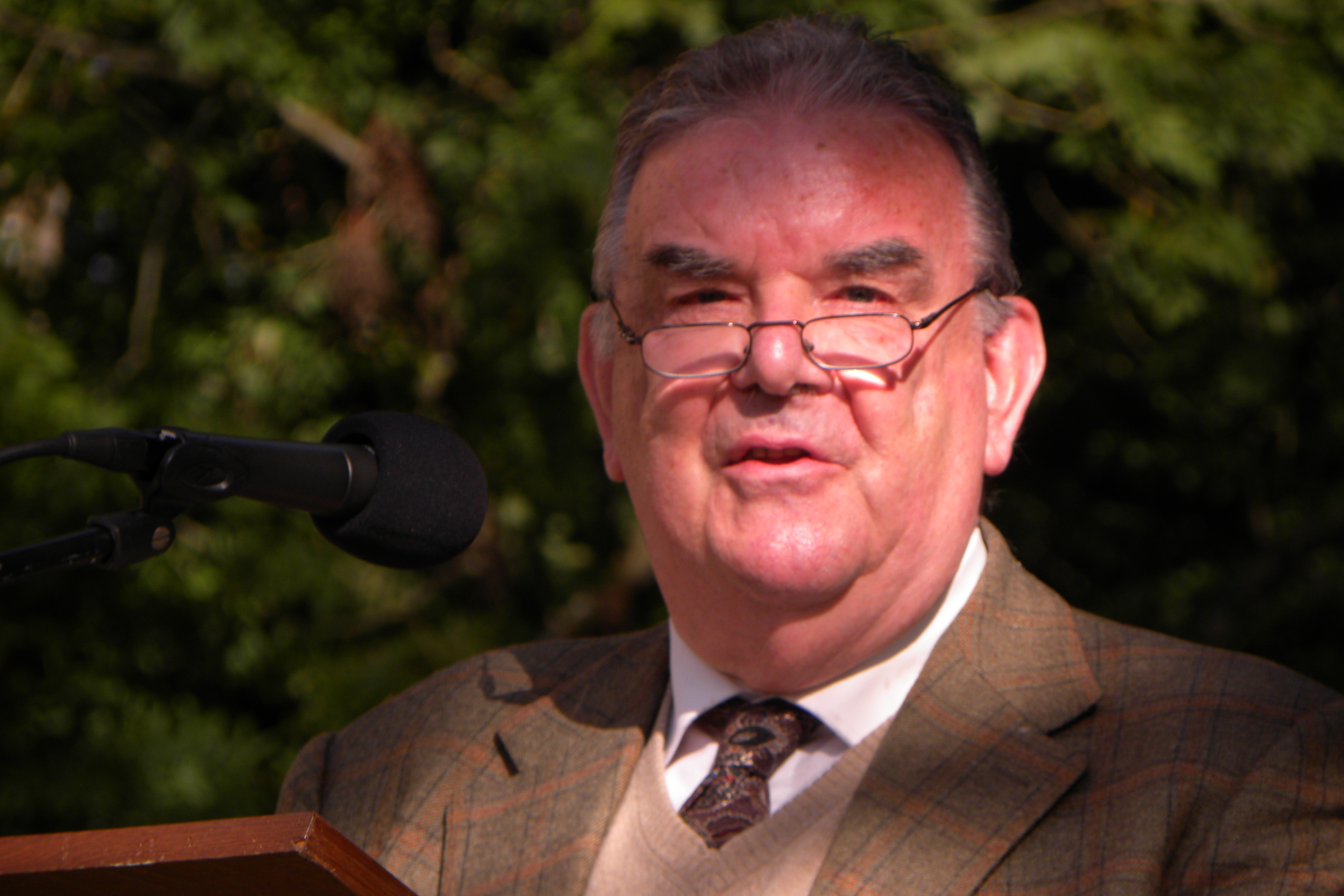
- Born: 24 May 1936; Schaerbeek, Belgium
- Died: 17 March 2020 (aged 83); Habay-la-Neuve, Habay, Belgium
- Occupation: Diplomat
- Children: André Nothomb; Juliette Nothomb; Amélie Nothomb

Baron Patrick Nothomb (24 May 1936 – 17 March 2020) was a Belgian diplomat.

== Biography ==
Nothomb earned a doctorate in law from the Université catholique de Louvain in 1957. He served as a Belgian diplomat from 1960 to 2001.

Patrick was the grandson of writer Pierre Nothomb, nephew of Charles-Ferdinand Nothomb, and the grandnephew of Jean-Baptiste Nothomb. He was the father of André Nothomb, writer Juliette Nothomb and novelist Amélie Nothomb (pseudonym of Fabienne-Claire Nothomb). Amélie covered the life of her father and their diplomatic family in her novel The Life of Hunger.

On 14 October 1953, Nothomb was granted the hereditary title of Baron for him and his family by King Baudouin.

In 2012, he earned Luxembourgian nationality due to his family lineage prior to the division of Luxembourg in 1839.

In his free time, Nothomb was a singer of the Japanese style Noh, and was a director of the Europalia festival in 2004 in Italy.

Nothomb died on 17 March 2020 from a heart attack and also COVID-19 during the COVID-19 pandemic in Belgium.

== Diplomatic career ==
- General Consul in Kisangani. He was taken as hostage by members of the Simba rebellion. He was rescued by Belgian paratroopers on 24 November 1964 in Operation Dragon Rouge.
- General Consul in Osaka (1968—1972)
- Chargé d'affaires in Beijing, first Belgian diplomat in the People's Republic of China (1972—1974)
- Advisor to the Ambassador of Belgium to the United Nations, New York City (1974—1977)
- Ambassador of Belgium to Bangladesh and Burma (1978—1980)
- Director of Asia at the Belgian Ministry of Foreign Affairs (1980—1985)
- Ambassador of Belgium to Thailand and Laos (1985—1988)
- Ambassador of Belgium to Japan (1988—1997)
- Ambassador of Belgium to Italy, San Marino, Malta, and Albania (1998—2001)

== Publications ==
- Dans Stanleyville : journal d'une prise d'otage (1993)
- Intolérance zéro : 42 ans de carrière diplomatique (2004)
