= Little Amélie or the Character of Rain =

- French theatrical release poster
- French: Amélie et la métaphysique des tubes
- Directed by: Maïlys Vallade; Liane-Cho Han
- Screenplay by: Liane-Cho Han; Aude Py; Maïlys Vallade; Eddine Noël
- Based on: The Character of Rain by Amélie Nothomb
- Produced by: Claire La Combe; Edwina Liard; Henri Magalon; Nidia Santiago
- Music by: Mari Fukuhara
- Production companies: Ikki Films; Maybe Movies; Puffin Pictures; 2 Minutes; France 3 Cinéma
- Distributed by: Haut et Court (France); Paradiso Filmed Entertainment (Belgium)
- Release dates: 20 May 2025 (Cannes); 25 June 2025 (France)
- Running time: 78 minutes
- Countries: France; Belgium
- Language: French
- Budget: €9.5 million
- Box office: $2.4 million

Little Amélie or the Character of Rain (French: Amélie et la métaphysique des tubes) is a 2025 independent animated fantasy drama film, directed by Maïlys Vallade and Liane-Cho Han. Produced by Maybe Movies and Ikki Films, it is an adaptation of the novel The Character of Rain (Métaphysique des tubes) by Amélie Nothomb.

The film had its world premiere at the 2025 Cannes Film Festival on 20 May, and it was theatrically released in France on 25 June. It received widespread acclaim for its emotional, audiovisual, and thematic merits. The film was nominated for Best Animated Feature at the 98th Academy Awards.

== Synopsis ==
Amélie is born in a vegetative state to a Belgian family living in Kobe, Japan. Amélie believes her condition makes her a god to everyone around her. On her second birthday, an earthquake occurs that causes Amélie to break free of her vegetative state and move around freely. She soon becomes frustrated and rejective of her family, causing her father Patrick to call for a nanny. At the suggestion of landlady Kashima-san, Nishio-san arrives to the household, alongside the family's grandmother Claude to stay for a while. Claude provides white chocolate to Amélie, calming her down. Amélie begins to bond with the family, except for her older brother, André.

After Amélie learns her first word, "vacuum cleaner" (aspirateur in French), Claude goes back to Belgium, upsetting Amélie. Nishio later finds Amélie, and reads to her a book about yōkai, starting a friendship between the two, to Kashima's chagrin. During their time together, Nishio shows Amélie a school of koi near a garden, teaches her the kanji word for rain (雨, ame) through a fogged window, and explains how she had lost her family in World War II. Later, Patrick learns of Claude's death and has to go to Belgium for two months, with Amélie sad yet confused about the concept of death. Upon Patrick's return, the family sans Nishio goes out to play in the beach. Amélie is reluctant to leave, but Nishio encourages her by recounting the memories of when she had visited as a child. Once there, Amélie takes and opens a jar, hoping to fill her beach experiences for Nishio. While staring curiously at the sea creatures, Amélie is caught up in the waves and nearly drowns. André saves her, finally earning him her respect. Returning home, Amélie shares the jar with Nishio; she thanks Amélie.

On Amélie's third birthday, she finds Nishio at the home of Kashima, who scolds Nishio for bonding with Amélie and asks if she had forgotten her own family. Amélie is caught listening to their conversation. While bringing her back to her family, Nishio is denounced by Kashima in front of Amélie's family. Nishio resigns as their nanny, leaving Amélie to celebrate her third birthday alone. Amélie is given her birthday present; three koi. However, Patrick informs Amélie that the family will soon be moving back to Belgium, further upsetting her.

One day while feeding her koi, Amélie throws herself into the pond. She ends up meeting Claude, who informs her that her time is not over. Amélie sees an outside vision of her past memory of accompanying Nishio near the window, who tells her to wake up. Amélie finds herself in a hospital, having been saved by Kashima and Nishio. Much later, the family enjoys winter, and now knowing how precious her time is with Nishio, Amélie officially recognizes that she is not a god, but a human.

== Cast ==
=== French language ===
- Loïse Charpentier narrates as Amélie
  - Emmylou Homs voices Amélie's dialogue
- Victoria Grosbois as Nishio-san
- Yumi Fujimori as Kashima-san
- Cathy Cerdà as Claude, the grandmother
- Marc Arnaud as Patrick, the father
- Laetitia Coryn as Danièle, the mother
- Haylee Issembourg as Juliette
- Isaac Schoumsky as André
- François Raison as Doctor and radio voice

=== English language ===
The English language cast as dubbed for the U.S. release by NYAV Post and GKIDS.

- Lily Gilliam narrates as Amélie
  - Lucille Ainsworth voices Amélie's dialogue
- Francesca Calo as Nishio-san
- Page Leong as Kashima-san
- Jayne Taini as Claude, the grandmother
- Brent Mukai as...
  - Patrick, the father
  - the radio announcer
- Jessica DiSalvo as Danièle, the mother
- Avril Kagan as Juliette
- Rhodes Carroll as André
- Michael C. Pizzuto as the doctor

== Distribution ==
Little Amélie or the Character of Rain premiered at the 2025 Cannes Film Festival on 20 May 2025 in the Special Screenings section. It was released in France on 25 June 2025 and distributed by distribution company Haut et Court. On 5 June, GKIDS acquired North American distribution rights, and a limited theatrical release starting 7 November.

The film had its North American festival premiere at the 2025 Toronto International Film Festival.

== Reception ==
On the review aggregator website Rotten Tomatoes, 97% of 90 critics' reviews are positive, with an average rating of 8.2/10. The website's consensus reads: "Conveying complex emotions through a deceptively simple story and dynamic colors, Little Amélie is an enchanting animated feature that brims with wisdom." On Metacritic, the film holds a weighted average score of 82/100 based on 20 critics, indicating "universal acclaim" reviews.

=== Accolades ===
Award / Film Festival	Date of ceremony	Category	Recipient(s)	Result	Ref.
Cannes Film Festival	24 May 2025	Camera d'Or	Maïlys Vallade and Liane-Cho Han	Nominated	
Annecy International Animation Film Festival	14 June 2025	Cristal Award for Best Feature Film	Little Amélie or the Character of Rain	Nominated	
Annecy International Animation Film Festival	14 June 2025	Audience Award	Little Amélie or the Character of Rain	Won	
San Sebastián International Film Festival	27 September 2025	City of Donostia / San Sebastián Audience Award for Best European Film	Little Amélie or the Character of Rain	Won	
Seville European Film Festival	15 November 2025	European Film Academy Selection – Audience Award	Little Amélie or the Character of Rain	Won	
Los Angeles Film Critics Association Awards	7 December 2025	Best Animation	Little Amélie or the Character of Rain	Won	
Washington D.C. Area Film Critics Association	December 7, 2025	Best Animated Film	Little Amélie or the Character of Rain	Nominated	
Michigan Movie Critics Guild	December 8, 2025	Best Animated Film	Little Amélie or the Character of Rain	Nominated	
Chicago Film Critics Association	December 11, 2025	Best Animated Feature	Little Amélie or the Character of Rain	Nominated	
San Francisco Bay Area Film Critics Circle	December 14, 2025	Best Animated Feature	Little Amélie or the Character of Rain	Nominated	
Indiana Film Journalists Association	December 15, 2025	Best Animated Film	Little Amélie or the Character of Rain	Nominated	
New York Film Critics Online	December 15, 2025	Best Animation	Little Amélie or the Character of Rain	Runner-up	
Seattle Film Critics Society	December 15, 2025	Best Animated Film	Little Amélie or the Character of Rain	Nominated	
San Diego Film Critics Society	December 15, 2025	Best Animated Film	Little Amélie or the Character of Rain	Runner-up	
Austin Film Critics Association	December 18, 2025	Best Animated Film	Little Amélie or the Character of Rain	Nominated	
Florida Film Critics Circle	December 19, 2025	Best Animated Film	Little Amélie or the Character of Rain	Won	
Online Association of Female Film Critics	December 19, 2025	Best Animated Feature	Little Amélie or the Character of Rain	Nominated	
Women Film Critics Circle	December 21, 2025	Best Animated Female	Amélie	Runner-up (Note: Tied with Judy Hopps from Zootopia 2)	
North Texas Film Critics Association	December 29, 2025	Best Animated Film	Little Amélie or the Character of Rain	Nominated	
New Jersey Film Critics Circle	December 31, 2025	Best Animated Feature	Little Amélie or the Character of Rain	Nominated	
Alliance of Women Film Journalists	December 31, 2025	Best Animated Feature	Little Amélie or the Character of Rain	Nominated	
Puerto Rico Critics Association	January 2, 2026	Best Animated Feature	Little Amélie or the Character of Rain	Nominated	
Critics' Choice Movie Awards	4 January 2026	Best Animated Feature	Little Amélie or the Character of Rain	Nominated	
Columbus Film Critics Association	January 8, 2026	Best Animated Film	Little Amélie or the Character of Rain	Won	
Astra Film Awards	9 January 2026	Best Animated Feature	Little Amélie or the Character of Rain	Nominated	
Greater Western New York Film Critics Association	January 10, 2026	Best Animated Film	Little Amélie or the Character of Rain	Nominated	
Golden Globe Awards	11 January 2026	Best Animated Motion Picture	Little Amélie or the Character of Rain	Nominated	
North Dakota Film Society	January 12, 2026	Best Animated Feature	Little Amélie or the Character of Rain	Nominated	
Music City Film Critics Association	January 12, 2026	Best Animated Film	Little Amélie or the Character of Rain	Nominated	
Utah Film Critics Association	January 17, 2026	Best Animated Feature	Little Amélie or the Character of Rain	Won	
Lumière Awards	18 January 2026	Best Animated Film	Little Amélie or the Character of Rain	Nominated	
London Film Critics Circle Awards	February 1, 2026	Animated Feature of the Year	Little Amélie or the Character of Rain	Nominated	
Annie Awards	February 21, 2026	Best Feature	Little Amélie or the Character of Rain	Nominated	
Annie Awards	February 21, 2026	Best Character Animation – Feature	Juliette Laurent	Nominated	
Annie Awards	February 21, 2026	Best Direction – Feature	Maïlys Vallade, Liane-Cho Han	Nominated	
Annie Awards	February 21, 2026	Best Music – Feature	Mari Fukuhara	Nominated	
Annie Awards	February 21, 2026	Best Storyboarding – Feature	Nicolas Pawlowski	Nominated	
Annie Awards	February 21, 2026	Best Writing – Feature	Liane-Cho Han, Aude Py, Maïlys Vallade, Eddine Noël	Nominated	
Annie Awards	February 21, 2026	Best Editorial – Feature	Ludovic Versace	Nominated	
Satellite Awards	March 8, 2026	Best Motion Picture – Animated or Mixed Media	Little Amélie or the Character of Rain	Nominated	
Academy Awards	March 15, 2026	Best Animated Feature	Little Amélie or the Character of Rain	Nominated	
World Soundtrack Awards	October 10, 2026	Discovery of the year	Mari Fukuhara	Nominated	
Hochi Film Awards	December 2026	Best Animated Picture	Little Amélie or the Character of Rain	Pending	
