= Attentat (novel) =

1997 novel by Amélie Nothomb

Attentat is a novel by Belgian author Amélie Nothomb. It was first published in 1997.

== Summary ==
In Attentat, the novelist creates two original characters for her readers. The grotesque yet enlightened Epiphane Otos both refined and vulnerable and Ethel, a smart young actress, portrayed as incredibly beautiful. The story is about Epiphane's love and devotion to Ethel. It is also a pretext for discourse on the idea of societal norms. Like in all books by Amélie Nothomb, literary and artistic references abound (for example Notre Dame de Paris). The use of little known vocabulary is equally an essential style trait of this novelist's work.

== Comment ==
All the author's ideas support the debate she puts forward on normality. What is a norm? What is the role, involuntary or not, played by society in the elaboration of such standards? Amélie Nothomb skillfully demonstrates depictions of beauty and ugliness throughout the dialogue between Epiphane and Ethel: We are thrown by others views, shaped by them. On a wider scale, Amélie Nothomb invites us to question our philosophies and core beliefs, through the character of Epiphane Otos. Are one's views on a given topic, fact, or idea a result of personal reflection or the absorption of a societal concept which has not yet been refuted?

Some minor oversights are present in this work. One example is where the author writes, "the square of my hypotenuse was equal to the sum of my right angles," whereas the square of the hypotenuse should be equal to the sum of the squares of the two other sides. In another quote, "it was six o'clock in the morning in Japan therefore 2pm at Ethel's" is erroneous even if it is not specified whether she lives in France or Belgium We do know however that the location is in Europe, somewhere west of Germany, thanks to a fax written by Epiphane during the journey to Japan which indicated the countries on the flight path. So the Time zone difference with Japan is not correctly calculated. In January, the month in which the action occurs, it is in fact 10pm in France or Belgium while it is already 6am the next day in Japan.

The impaling scene was inspired by a music video called Sans Logique by Mylène Farmer who is known to the novelist.
