= Pierre Nothomb =

Belgian writer and right-wing politician

- Born: Pierre Nothomb; 28 March 1887
- Died: 29 December 1966 (aged 79)
- Other name: Napoleon de la Marmaille
- Education: Doctorate in politics
- Alma mater: Catholic University of Leuven
- Occupation: Writer
- Title: Baron (1937, personal/non-hereditary)
- Political party: Catholic Party, Action Nationale, Christian Social Party
- Children: Charles-Ferdinand Nothomb, Paul Nothomb
- Relatives: Jean-Baptiste Nothomb (ancestor), François Roelants du Vivier (grandson), Amélie Nothomb (great-granddaughter)

Pierre, Baron Nothomb (28 March 1887 – 29 December 1966) was a Belgian writer and right-wing politician. He was well known for his varied and voluminous output of prose and poetry. His works included poetry, essays, novels, biographies marked by their passionate tone, imagination, religious sentiment and attention to the detail.

In the period between the two world wars, Nothomb also came to prominence as the co-founder of several reactionary and near-fascist nationalist movements. In the post-war era Nothomb continued to be active in politics, albeit as an advocate of an ever closer Europe.

== Early life ==
Nothomb was born in Tournai into a family of Belgian politicians and public servants. He was elevated to the Belgian nobility in 1933 at the age of 46 and was awarded the personnel title (non-hereditary) of baron in 1937 when he was 50 years old. He was a descendant of Jean-Baptiste Nothomb. Nothomb studied at the Catholic University of Leuven from which he graduated with his doctorate in politics in 1910. By the age of 20 he was a regular author for Catholic journals. During World War I Nothomb worked as a propaganda writer for the Belgian government, producing such works as Les Barbares et la Belgique, La Belgique martyre, Le Roi Albert and Villes meurtries de Belgique.

== Politics ==
Initially eschewing the Action Française tendency that was influencing Belgian Catholic thinking at the time Nothomb and his political ally Pierre Daye instead looked towards a republican nationalism. He set up the Great Belgium Movement during the war and this re-emerged after 1918 as the Comité de politique nationale. This movement made no secret of its desire to see Belgium annex both Luxembourg and Dutch Limburg. Initially associated with the Catholic Party his journal Renaissance nationale became critical of the direction of this party and in 1924 he formed the rightist Action Nationale as a more Maurrasian alternative. These groups were associated with anti-Semitism and have been seen as early fascist movements. He expressed some enthusiasm for corporatism, although by this time he had also become a staunch monarchist alongside this. Nothomb now came to recognise Enrico Corradini as his ideological model.

For a time he became associated with Paul Hoornaert but they split in 1927 when Nothomb returned to the Catholic Party. However, during the time of their alliance Nothomb had at his disposal the Jeunesses Nationales, a 3000 strong youth movement that took part in street fights with Belgium's socialist and communist youth groups. Such was the notoriety of this group that Nothomb was given the nickname Napoleon de la Marmaille or "Napoleon of the brats".

Still associated with the Catholic Party by 1931 Nothomb had joined L'Authorité, a highly reactionary non-party group. He would later write the occasional article for Rexist journals but did not commit to this group and also maintained good relations with Verdinaso leader Joris Van Severen.

In June 1936 the Provincial Council of Luxembourg province nominated Nothomb to the Belgian Senate. Barring a brief absence in 1939 Nothomb served in this body until 1966. He transferred to the Arlon seat in 1949, by which time he had joined the Christian Social Party. As a post-war Senator he continued to advocate the expansion of Belgium's borders but became convinced that the most realistic method of achieving this would be through a wider programme of European integration which he publicly endorsed.

== Writing ==
Throughout his life Nothomb was prolific as both a poet and a novelist. In his poetic works Nothomb was noted for his mystic symbolism, and his most celebrated works include L'Arc-en-ciel (1909), Marisabelle (1920), Ans de grâce (1958), Élégie du solstice (1959) and L'Été d'octobre (1963). As a novelist his two historical works Risquons-tout (1926) and Les Dragons de Latour (1934) are amongst his most well-known. Other poetic and fictional works were inspired by the Bible, notably Vie d'Adam (1929), L'Égrégore (1945) and Le Roi David (1960). He also dabbled in science fiction, as evidenced by his 1922 novel La Rédemption de Mars concerning two astronauts visiting Mars. A further series of novels, such as Le Sens du pays (1930), La Ligne de faîte (1945) and Curieux Personnages (1942) focused on his love of the Ardennes.

== Family ==
He was the father of Charles-Ferdinand Nothomb, who eulogised him in Parliament, and Jean-François Nothomb, a leader of the Comet Escape Line during World War II. He was also the father of writer Paul Nothomb, the grandfather of diplomat Patrick Nothomb and politician François Roelants du Vivier and the great-grandfather of novelist Amélie Nothomb.
