= Hygiene and the Assassin =

1992 novel by Amélie Nothomb

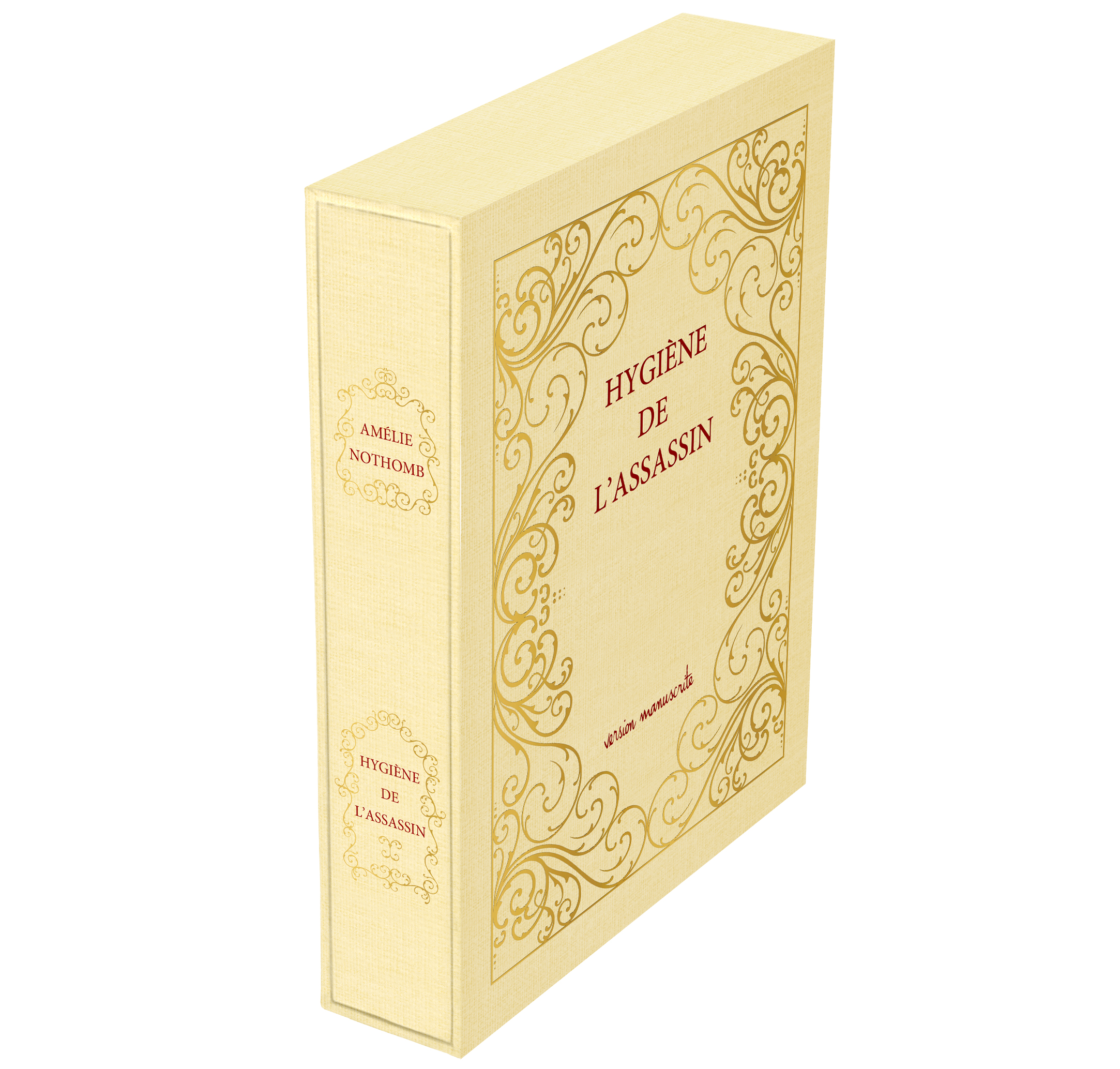
- Author: Amélie Nothomb
- Original title: Hygiène de l'assassin
- Translator: Alison Anderson
- Language: French
- Genre: Novel
- Published: 1992 Albin Michel
- Publication place: Belgium
- Media type: Print
- Pages: 181 pp
- ISBN: 2-226-05964-4
- Followed by: Loving Sabotage

Hygiene and the Assassin (French: Hygiène de l'assassin, lit. "The Assassin's Hygiene") is the first novel by the Belgian novelist Amélie Nothomb. It was published in 1992 by Albin Michel. The novel is written almost entirely in dialogue.

== Plot ==
The famous novelist Prétextat Tach is stricken by "Elzenveiverplatz syndrome" (an imaginary syndrome invented by the author), a cancer of the cartilage, and has only two more months to live. Almost immediately, many journalists rush to interview Tach for a scoop. However, after the first few interviews, the reader realizes that Tach is an obese and obnoxious misanthrope of the worst kind: acerbic, intolerant, a provocateur and a misogynist, who cannot tolerate any questions about his private life and has the audacity to turn the interviews into a cesspool of disgust for his interviewers. Thus, all the interviews fall short, until Nina, a relatively unknown journalist becomes the latest victim of the novelist. Unlike all the other journalists before, however, this journalist is a woman, so that the interview quickly takes the form of a confrontation between the journalist and the Nobel literature prize laureate. In a locked room full of mysteries, she will challenge the odious misogyny of Tach and, as the questions and answers wear on, confront Tach with the demons of his former life. By the end of the story, the novelist is revealed to be a murderer with a strange obsession about the filthiness he thinks puberty brings upon girls and turns them into adult women, and how his spirit will live on even in death. Nina ends up strangling Tach, mirroring a scene in Tach's book.

== Film adaptation ==
The novel was adapted for film by François Ruggieri in 1999. It starred Jean Yanne as Prétextat Tach, Barbara Schulz as Nina, as well as Catherine Hiegel, Sophie Broustal, Jean Prat and Richard Gotainer.
