= Life Form (novel) =

Novel by Amélie Nothomb

- Author: Amélie Nothomb
- Original title: Une forme de vie
- Translator: Alison Anderson
- Genre: Epistolary novel
- Published: Albin Michel
- Media type: Print
- ISBN: 978-2226215178

Life Form, (French: Une forme de vie) is the nineteenth novel by Belgian writer Amélie Nothomb, published in French in 2010 by Albin Michel and translated into English by Alison Anderson. It was nominated at the International Dublin Literary Award.

The short novel features a fictional correspondence between Amélie Nothomb the writer, and Melvin Mapple, an obese lonely and anxious US Army soldier stationed in Baghdad, Iraq.
Through their correspondence, the two construct a separate, shared reality in text.
It brings the author to interweave in the narration, reflections on language, writing, reality, experiences, communication and "artistic modernity".

Autofiction and mise en abyme, edgy and weird with a surrealistic ending.
