= Fear and Trembling (film) =

- Film poster
- Stupeur et Tremblements
- Directed by: Alain Corneau
- Screenplay by: Alain Corneau
- Based on: Fear and Trembling by Amélie Nothomb
- Produced by: Alain Sarde
- Starring: Sylvie Testud; Kaori Tsuji; Taro Suwa; Bison Katayama
- Cinematography: Yves Angelo
- Edited by: Thierry Derocles
- Distributed by: BAC Films
- Release date: 12 March 2003
- Running time: 107 minutes
- Country: France
- Languages: Japanese; French
- Budget: €5.3 million
- Box office: $2.3 million

Fear and Trembling (original title: Stupeur et Tremblements) is a 2003 French film based on the 1999 novel by Amélie Nothomb. It was written and directed by Alain Corneau and stars Sylvie Testud.

== Plot ==
Amélie, a young Belgian woman, having spent her childhood in Japan, decides to return to live there and integrate into Japanese society. She is determined to be a "real Japanese" before her one year contract runs out, though it is precisely this determination that is incompatible with Japanese humility. Though she is hired for a choice position as a translator at an import/export firm, her inability to understand Japanese cultural and business norms and allocation to work for which she is not suited result in increasingly humiliating demotions.

Though Amelie secretly adores her immediate supervisor, Ms Mori (Kaori Tsuji), the latter takes sadistic pleasure in belittling Amelie. Mori finally manages to break Amelie's will by making her the bathroom attendant, and is delighted when Amelie tells her that she will not renew her contract. Amelie realizes that she is finally a real Japanese when she enters the company president's office "with fear and trembling," which was possible only because her determination had been broken by Mori's systematic humiliation.

The title, "Fear and Trembling", is said in the film to be the way Japanese must behave when addressing the Emperor. For Westerners, it calls to mind a line from Philippians 2:12, "continue to work out your salvation with fear and trembling", which could also describe Amélie's attitude during her year at Yumimoto.

== Cast ==
- Sylvie Testud as Amélie
- Kaori Tsuji as Fubuki
- Taro Suwa as Mr. Saito
- Bison Katayama as Mr. Omochi
- Yasunari Kondo as Mr. Tenshi
- Sokyu Fujita as Mr. Haneda
- Gen Shimaoka as Mr. Unaji
- Heileigh Gomes as young Amélie
- Eri Sakai as young Fubuki

== Critical response ==
On Rotten Tomatoes, the film holds an approval rating of 91%, based on 35 reviews, with an average rating of 7.3/10. The site's critical consensus reads, "This tale of culture clash is by turns downbeat and hilarious." On Metacritic the film has a score of 75 out of 100, based on 17 critics, indicating "generally favorable reviews".

A. O. Scott of The New York Times wrote that though there are moments in the film which seem well observed, there are also times when the film slips toward stereotyping.

== Accolades ==
Award / Film Festival	Category	Recipients and nominees	Result
César Awards	Best Actress	Sylvie Testud	Won
César Awards	Best Original Screenplay or Adaptation	Alain Corneau	Nominated
Karlovy Vary International Film Festival	Best Actress	Sylvie Testud	Won
Karlovy Vary International Film Festival	Special Mention		Won
Karlovy Vary International Film Festival	Crystal Globe		Nominated
Lumière Awards	Best Actress	Sylvie Testud	Won
