= Jean-Paul Dubois =

French journalist and author (born 1950)

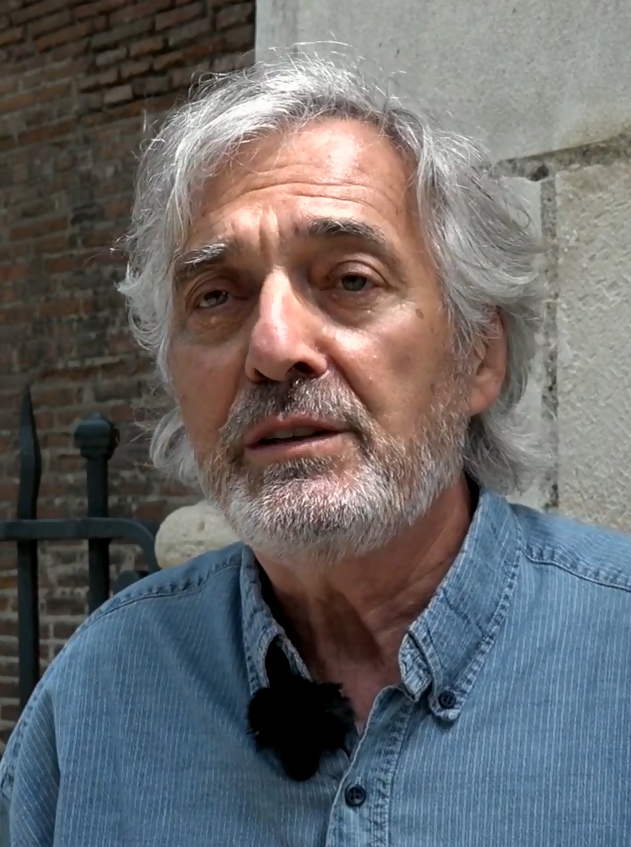
Jean-Paul Dubois in 2016.

Jean-Paul Dubois (French pronunciation: [ʒɑ̃ pɔl dybwa]; born 1950 in Toulouse, Haute-Garonne) is a French journalist and author. He won the Prix Goncourt in 2019 for Tous les hommes n'habitent pas le monde de la même façon ("All Men Do Not Inhabit This World in the Same Way"), a novel told from the perspective of a prisoner looking back on life. The jury compared Dubois to John Irving and William Boyd, who wrote books that were both popular and critical successes.

He is the author of several novels and travel pieces, and is a reporter for Le Nouvel Observateur. His novel, Une vie française, published in French in 2004 and in English in 2007, is a saga of the French baby boom generation, from the idealism of the 1960s to the consumerism of the 1990s. The French version of the novel won the Prix Femina.

== Works ==
- Tous les matins je me lève : roman, Éditions Robert Laffont, 1988, ISBN 978-2221056448
- Kennedy et moi: roman, Seuil, 1996, ISBN 978-2-02-028539-1
- Je pense à autre chose, Editions de l'Olivier, 1997, ISBN 978-2-87929-144-4
- Si ce livre pouvait me rapprocher de toi, Éditions de l'Olivier, 1999, ISBN 978-2-87929-218-2
- Vie Francaise. Olivier. 2004. ISBN 978-2-87929-467-4.; Random House Digital, Inc. 2008, ISBN 978-1-4000-9678-7
  - A French Life, Penguin Books, 2008, ISBN 978-0-14-102482-0
- Foreword to Doisneau, Robert (2010). Palm Springs 1960. Paris: Flammarion. p. 156. ISBN 978-2-08-030129-1. LCCN 2010442384. OCLC 491896174.
- Le cas Sneijder, Editions de l'Olivier, 2011, ISBN 978-2-87929-864-1
- Tous les hommes n'habitent pas le monde de la même façon, Editions de l'Olivier, 2019, ISBN 9782823615166, Prix Goncourt
