= The Enemy's Cosmetique =

2001 novel by Amélie Nothomb

- First edition
- Author: Amélie Nothomb
- Original title: Cosmétique de l'ennemi
- Language: French
- Genre: Novel
- Publisher: Albin Michel
- Publication place: Belgium

The Enemy's Cosmetique (French: Cosmétique de l'ennemi) is the tenth novel written by Belgian author Amélie Nothomb. It was also the tenth book published by Albin Michel. It was first published in 2001.

== Plot summary ==
"Without wanting to, I have committed the perfect crime: nobody saw me coming, except for the victim. The proof, I am still free."

The whole story takes place at an airport. Jérôme Angust, a man on a business trip, waits for a delayed flight. He meets another man, who introduces himself as Textor Texel from Holland. At first Angust is annoyed by Texel, who insists on talking to him, despite cues that Angust is not interested in being engaged. He wonders why Texel insists on talking to him. Texel explains that he simply wants to, and he always does exactly what he wants. Eventually Angust becomes drawn into the conversation. Texel begins telling a story about his childhood, in which he believes he "murdered" one of his elementary-school classmates. Texel explains that as a child he had always been envious of the boy (named Franck) who was more popular than Texel, and so one night he prayed to God that Franck would die. The next morning it was revealed that the Franck had died unexpectedly during the night of cardiac arrest.

The conversation between Texel and Angust continues, and Texel tells another story from his childhood. When Texel was around 12 years old he lived with his grandparents, and one of his jobs was to mix the cat food and serve it to the cats. He hated the job, as the fish and rice concoction always nauseated him and he had to close his eyes while he mixed it. One day however, he forced himself to eat it, and found it so appealing that he ravenously ate all of the cat food himself while the cats looked on. Texel explains that he does not believe in God or the Devil, but rather in "l'ennemi," the self's personal enemy that is inside of everyone. At this point, Angust decides he has heard enough and tries to block out Texel's words by covering his ears with his hands. Eventually however, his arms become tired and he is forced to lower them. The conversation continues.

Texel asks Angust about his wife. It becomes clear that Angust used to be married, but his wife has died. Texel begins telling another story, about the only woman he ever loved. He met her in the Montmartre Cemetery in Paris and was immediately struck by her beauty and resemblance to a certain statue in the graveyard. Because he is used to doing what he wants, Texel assaulted and raped her there in the graveyard, afterwards professing his love to her and demanding to know her name. She refused to tell him.

After the encounter, Texel searched Paris obsessively for the woman and finally found her again, ten years later in the 20th arrondissement of Paris. Not recognizing him as her attacker, the woman assumed Texel was a friend of her husband's and kindly invited him back to her home for tea. Partway through the tea, the woman recognizes Texel by his laugh. She demands to know if he has come back to rape her again, and warns him that if he tries, she will defend herself with knives from the kitchen. Texel tells her that that was why he had come - firstly to learn her name, and secondly to allow her to finally avenge herself for the rape by killing him. He goes and gets a knife from the kitchen and holds it out to her, inviting her to stab and kill him, but when she refuses, he stabs her in the stomach instead, killing her. In the papers the next morning, Texel finally learns the woman's name - Isabelle.

At this point in the novel it becomes clear that Isabelle is in fact Angust's late wife. Angust becomes agitated and calls over some nearby police officers, despite Texel's assurances that it won't do any good. The police officers completely ignore Texel, instead demanding to see Angust's identification. It then becomes clear that Texel is invisible - Angust is the only one who can see him. Texel explains that he and Angust are one and the same - Texel is Angust's "inner enemy" that he was talking about before - his inner conscience. The story ends with Jerome Angust, unable to cope, seizing Texel and bashing his head against the wall until he dies.

== Adaptation for theatre ==
This novel has been adapted for theatre in a creation and co-production of both fr:Théâtre Le Public in Brussels and fr:Théâtre de l’Ancre in Charleroi in 2005 and in 2006 at Vatteater.

- Actors : fr:Philippe Jeusette and fr:Alexandre Trocki
- Directed by : fr:Janine Godinas
- Lighting : Zvonoc
- Set Construction : Giuseppe Coppolino
- Assisted by : Julien Flach, Raymond Verbelen and Didier Cornet
- Photos : Cassandre Sturbois
- Technical Director : Gérard Raquet

== Film adaptation ==
A Perfect Enemy, a 2020 joint Germano-Franco-Spanish production in English, directed by Kike Maíllo.
