= Juliette Nothomb =

Belgian writer (born 1963)

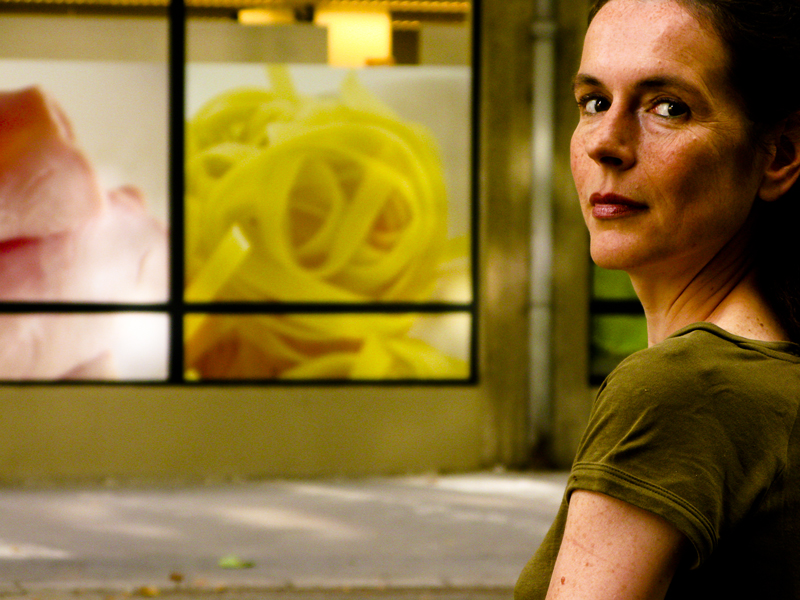
Juliette Nothomb, 2008

Juliette Nothomb (born 27 October 1963 Kinshasa) is a Belgian writer.

== Life ==
Juliette Nothomb was born in Kinshasa, and she grew up in many countries: Japan, United States, China, and Laos.

She has written cookbooks and books for children. She works for publications like Le Vif/L'Express or Télépro.

In 2020, she participated in an online international book fair (salon du livre international sur internet).

In 2021, she signed a letter supporting Alexei Navalny. She was interviewed on "La Table des bons vivants".

== Family ==
Her sister is Amélie Nothomb. Their father, Patrick Nothomb, was a diplomat.

== Selected works ==
=== Books ===
- La cuisine d'Amélie : 80 recettes de derrière les fagots, 2008. ISBN 978-2-226-18734-5
- Des souris et des mômes, 2010. ISBN 978-2-226-20861-3
- La vraie histoire de la femme sans tête, 2011. ISBN 978-2-226-22033-2
- Carrément biscuits, 2012. ISBN 978-2-507-05057-3
- Carrément pralines, 2013. ISBN 978-2-507-05153-2
- Les sept canailles de la Bleue Maison, 2014. ISBN 978-2-87413-231-5
- Pénurie dans la galaxie, 2017. ISBN 978-2-93075-681-3
- Aimer Lyon : 200 adresses à partager, 2018. ISBN 978-2-8047-0607-4

=== Books in English ===
- Totally godiva. W W Norton, 2014. ISBN 9781581572476
