= Attentat (band) =

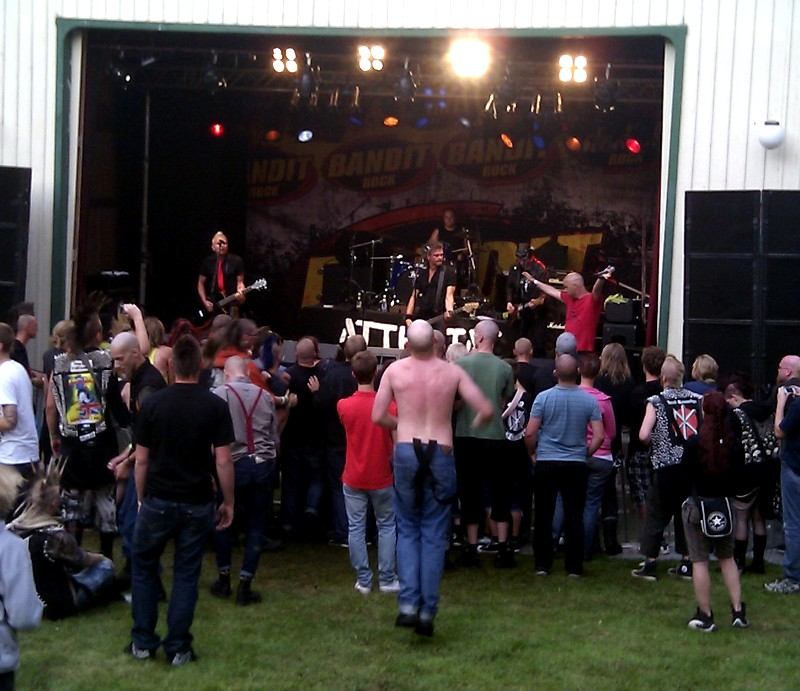
- Attentat playing during the Sjöslaget festival in Nävekvarn, July 2011

Background information
- Origin: Askim, Sweden
- Genres: punk rock
- Years active: 1978-

Attentat is a Swedish punk band originating from Askim, Gothenburg, Sweden and established in 1978. It fronted Mats Jönsson on vocals. Original members also included Magnus "Paddan" Rydman, Martin "Grodan" Fabian and Dag Wetterholm. The band was known as The Frogs before being renamed Attentat. The first singles were on their own label "Rickman", but the debut album Tatuerade tårar was released in 1981 on Hiss Records, before being signed to Transmission. The band was on a hiatus after 1984 but had a comeback in 1991 and 1992 after signing with Arda Records. They also came together in 1998 for the 20th anniversary and in 2003 for the 25th anniversary. Later line-ups included Mats Jönsson on vocals, Magnus "Paddan/Remdo" Rydman on guitar, both from the original band as well as Cristian "Crippa" Odin on bass and Peter Björklund on drums. The compilation album Fy Fan! released in 2013 on the band's own Rykkman Records raised interest in the band's legacy and climbed the Swedish Albums Chart reaching number 20.

== Discography ==
=== Albums ===
Studio albums

- 1981: Tatuerade tårar (Hiss Records)
- 1983: Här å nu!
- 1984: I denna stan
- 1992: Nerv

Compilations

- 1991: Pilsner, punk & poesi (Arda Records)
- 2010: Attentat är bäst
- 2010: Jag ska inte bli som dom (early punk singles and outtakes - on vinyl)
- 2013: Fy Fan! (Rykkman Records) (peaked at #20 in Swedish Albums Chart)

Live albums

- 2003: Attentat lever

=== Singles ===
- 1979: "Ge fan i mej (Rykkman Records)
- 1979: "Stila dej inte (Rykkman Records)
- 1980: "Born To Be Malaj" (Rykkman Records)
- 1982: "Fågel" (Nacksving)
- 1985: "Like Yesterdays"
- 1992: "Tvärs Över Tiden" (Arda Records)
