= Amélie Nothomb =

Belgian writer (born 1967)

Baroness Amélie Nothomb
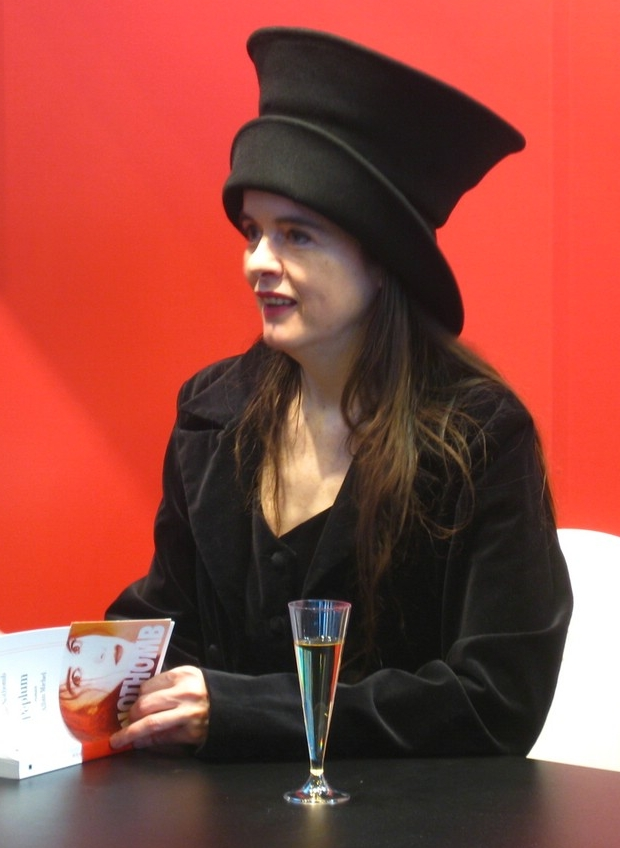
- Amélie Nothomb on 14 March 2009
- Born: Fabienne Claire Nothomb; 9 July 1966 (age 60) or 13 August 1967 (age 59); Etterbeek, Belgium or Kōbe, Japan (disputed: see article body)
- Education: Université libre de Bruxelles
- Occupation: Writer
- Writing career
- Notable works: Loving Sabotage; Fear and Trembling; Tokyo Fiancée; The Life of Hunger
- Notable awards: Order of the Crown (Belgium), member of Académie royale de langue et de littérature françaises de Belgique, Prix littéraire de la vocation, Prix Jacques Chardonne, Prix de Flore, Prix Alain-Fournier, Grand prix Jean Giono, Grand Prix du roman de l'Académie française
- Website: amelie-nothomb.com

Baroness Fabienne Claire Nothomb (Kobe, born 13 August 1967), better known by her pen name Amélie Nothomb (French: [ameli nɔtɔ̃b]), is a Belgian Francophone novelist.

Since the publication of her first novel Hygiene and the Assassin in 1992 at the age of twenty-six, Nothomb has published a book a year, and is regularly among the best selling French Language authors according to the Complete Review. She is a Commander of the Order of the Crown and has had the title of Baroness bestowed upon her by King Philippe of Belgium. Her satirical novel about corporate life in Japan Fear and Trembling won the Grand Prix du roman de l'Académie française in 1999, and in 2015 she was elected to the Royal Academy of French Language and Literature in Belgium.

== Biography ==
Amélie Nothomb was born in Etterbeek, Brussels-Capital Region on 9 July 1966, although she has claimed to have been born in Kobe, Japan in 1967, (Note: For example, her Elle France bio claims that her birthdate is 13 August 1967.) whereas records show her living there only from ages two to five. Subsequently, she lived in China, New York City, Bangladesh, Burma, and Laos. She stems from a Belgian noble family. Her father was the Belgian diplomat Patrick Nothomb, and she is the grandniece of Charles-Ferdinand Nothomb, a Belgian foreign minister (1980–1981), and great-granddaughter of writer and politician Pierre Nothomb. She has one brother (André Nothomb) and one sister, Juliette Nothomb, who is an author of culinary and children's books.

Her family's coat of arms

While in Japan, Nothomb attended a local school and learned Japanese. When she was five, the family moved to China. She remarked in Fear and Trembling that leaving Japan was "a wrenching separation for me".

She studied philology at the Université libre de Bruxelles, initially planning to become a teacher After having finished her studies, Nothomb returned to Japan to work in a Japanese company in Tokyo.

== Writing career ==
Nothomb's first novel, Hygiène de l'assassin, was published in 1992. Since then, she has published approximately one novel per year, including Les Catilinaires (1995), Fear and Trembling (1999), and Métaphysique des tubes (2000). She has been awarded numerous prizes, including the 1993 Prix Jacques-Chardonne, the 1999 Grand Prix du roman de l'Académie française, the Grand prix Jean Giono (2008), and since 2015 has been a member of the Belgium Royal Academy of French language and literature.

She wrote a romanticized biography (The Book of Proper Names) of French female singer Robert in 2002 and during the period 2000–2002 wrote the lyrics for nine tracks by the same artist.

A documentary — Amélie Nothomb: une vie entre deux eaux (A Life between two Waters) — co-written and directed by Laurelinne Amanieux and Luca Chiari, about Nothombs return to Japan was made in 2012.

Iin The Life of Hunger, and then in more detail in her book Psychopompe she describes to have been victim of rape at the age of twelve on a beach while living in Bangladesh, and she recounts in Le Livre des soeurs how she subsequently fought anorexia nervosa.

By a Royal Decree of 8 July 2015, Nothomb was ennobled as a non-hereditary baroness.

Her novel Premier sang depicts the fictional memoirs of her father, who had died in 2020, written in the first person. The book won the Prix Renaudot 2021.

== Personality and quirks ==
=== Writing process ===
In a 2004 interview in La Libre Belgique, Nothomb stated that she writes four novels a year but publishes only one, not wanting the others to come out. She writes all her manuscripts rigorously by hand with a ballpoint pen in notebooks everyday from 4 a.m. to 8 a.m. "I do what I can to achieve it (serenity) by waking up every morning at 4 a.m. to write, to pursue to the utmost my passions, my urges, my inner violence, my energy and my endeavors." After that, she goes to her publishing house to reply to her readers, also in handwritten form. She receives several dozen letters from readers every day, and says that she tries to answer most of them personally.

She has claimed to own neither a computer nor a mobile phone.

She has stated in a podcast that when writing she only drinks black tea before lunch, stating that "strong tea on an empty stomach, in large quantities and with no milk or sugar, procures a state of dry and controllable inebriety, as well as the energy I need to write" and drinks Champagne after lunch. She had a period of abstinence from alcohol between the age of 13 and 33 in which she was struggling with her mental health.

=== Perception ===
Nothomb is notorious for her dramatic appearance, with bold fashion choices and contrasting makeup (alabaster foundation and red lipstick), sometimes appearing in striking hats and her makeup showing a Japanese influence.

She frequently discusses her presumed neurodivergent traits and frequently portrays characters with autistic traits. She lacks an official clinical diagnosis, stating "Several people have asked me if I am autistic. Maybe I am. But what is the point?" Her work The Character of Rain covers her early years and explores this.

== Activities and honors ==
She is an animal rights advocate and was once honorary president of CRAC, an international anti-bullfighting organization. The International Astronomical Union named an asteroid "Nothomb" in her honor in 2006.

=== Titles and academic distinctions ===
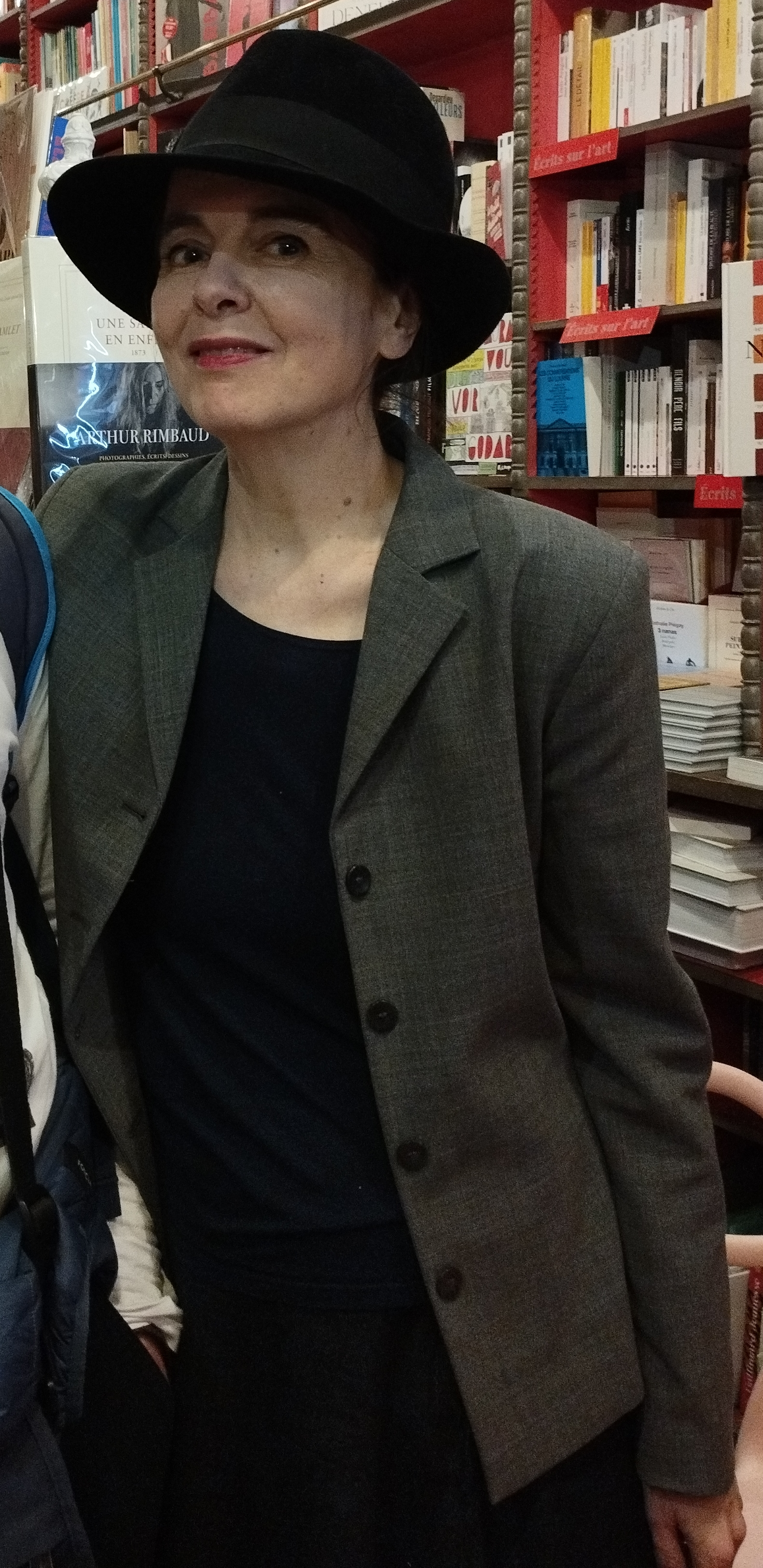
Amélie Nothomb at a book signing at the Librairie des Abbesses in November 2023

By order of the sovereign Albert II, King of Belgium, on 9 July 2008, Amélie Nothumb was granted the distinguished honor of Commander of the Order of the Crown.

By sovereign order, 8 July 2015, Madame Fabienne Claire, also known as Amélie Nothumb, was granted the personal title of Baronness.

In 2015, Nothomb was elected a member of the Académie royale de langue et de littérature françaises de Belgique. She was chosen "by a vast majority" for "the importance of the work, her originality and her consistency, and her international influence," explained Jacques De Decker, the academy's permanent secretary. She assumed the seat of the Belgian writer and sinologist Simon Leys, whom she has praised with feeling.

== Bibliography (works written by her) ==
Published (in French)	Type	Original title	English title	English publication details
1992	novel	Hygiène de l'assassin	Hygiene and the Assassin	Europa Editions, hardback, 2010 ISBN 978-1-933372-77-8
1993	novel	Le Sabotage amoureux	Loving Sabotage	W. W. Norton & Co, hardback, 2000, ISBN 0-8112-1459-1; Faber and Faber, paperback, 2003, ISBN 0-571-22663-9
1993	tale	Légende un peu chinoise (Longue Vue)		
1994	play	Les Combustibles	Human Rites	Oberon Books, paperback, 2005, ISBN 1-84002-539-5
1995	novel	Les Catilinaires	The Stranger Next Door	Holt (Henry) & Co, hardback, 1996, ISBN 0-8050-4841-3
1996	novel	Péplum		
1996	14 pages short story	Électre (Stock)		
1996	short story	L'Existence de Dieu (La Revue Générale)		
1997	novel	Attentat		
1998	novel	Mercure		
1999	novel	Stupeur et tremblements	Fear and Trembling	Faber and Faber, paperback, 2002, ISBN 0-571-22048-7
1999	39 pages short story	Le Mystère par excellence (Le Grand livre du mois)		
2000	novel	Métaphysique des tubes	The Character of Rain	Faber and Faber, paperback, 2003, ISBN 0-571-22049-5
2000	3 tales	Brillant comme une casserole (La Pierre d'Alun)		
2001	novel	Cosmétique de l'ennemi	The Enemy's Cosmetique	
2001	2 pages short story	Aspirin		
2001	64 pages short story	Sans nom (Elle)		
2002	novel	Robert des noms propres	The Book of Proper Names	Faber and Faber, paperback, 2004, ISBN 0-571-22344-3
2003	novel	Antéchrista	Antichrista	Faber and Faber, paperback, 2004, ISBN 0-571-22483-0
2004	46 pages short story	L'Entrée du Christ à Bruxelles (Elle)		
2004	novel	Biographie de la faim	The Life of Hunger	Faber and Faber, hardback, 2006
2005	novel	Acide sulfurique	Sulphuric Acid	Faber and Faber, hardback, 2007
2006	novel	Journal d'Hirondelle		
2007	novel	Ni d'Eve, ni d'Adam	Tokyo Fiancée	Europa Editions, hardback, 2008
2007	short story in 9 episodes	Les Champignons de Paris (Charlie Hebdo)		
2008	novel	Le Fait du prince	The Prince's Act	Éditions Albin Michel
2009	novel	Le Voyage d'Hiver	The Winter Journey	Éditions Albin Michel
2010	novel	Une forme de vie	Life Form	Europa Editions, hardback
2011	novel	Tuer le père		Éditions Albin Michel
2012	novel	Barbe bleue		Éditions Albin Michel
2013	novel	La nostalgie heureuse		Éditions Albin Michel
2014	novel	Pétronille	Pétronille	Europa Editions, paperback, 2015
2015	novel	Le Crime du comte Neville		Éditions Albin Michel
2016	novel	Riquet à la houppe		Éditions Albin Michel
2017	novel	Frappe-toi le cœur	Strike your Heart	Éditions Albin Michel, Europa Editions ISBN 978-1609454852
2018	novel	Les prénoms épicènes		Éditions Albin Michel
2019	novel	Soif	Thirst	Europa Editions, ISBN 978-1-60945-660-3
2020	novel	Les aérostats		Éditions Albin Michel, ISBN 978-2-226-45408-9
2021	novel	Premier sang	First Blood	Europa Editions
2022	novel	Le livre des sœurs		Éditions Albin Michel
2023	novel	Psychopompe		Éditions Albin Michel, ISBN 978-2-226-48561-8
2024	novel	L'impossible retour		Éditions Albin Michel, ISBN 978-2-226-49594-5
2025	novel	Tant mieux		Éditions Albin Michel, ISBN 978-2-226-18571-6

Unless otherwise stated, all works were originally published in French by Éditions Albin Michel.

== Adaptations ==
=== Film adaptations ===
- 1999: Hygiène de l'assassin (Hygiene and the Assassin), French movie directed by François Ruggieri, with Jean Yanne (Prétextat Tach) and Barbara Schulz (Nina).
- 2003: Stupeur et tremblements (Fear and Trembling), French movie directed by Alain Corneau with Sylvie Testud (Amélie) and Kaori Tsuji (Fubuki).
- 2014: Tokyo Fiancée, Belgian movie directed by Stefan Liberski with Pauline Etienne (Amélie) and Taichi Inoue (Rinri)
- 2021: A Perfect Enemy (adaptation of the novel, Cosmétique de l'ennemi), French movie directed by Kike Maíllo.
- 2025: Little Amélie or the Character of Rain, French animated film directed by Maïlys Vallade and Liane-Cho Han

=== Stage adaptations ===
- Le sabotage amoureux (English: Loving sabotage), Theater Le Ranelagh, Paris, 1999

With Valérie Mairesse, Pétronille de Saint-Rapt, Vanessa Jarry Direction: Annabelle Milot

- Le sabotage amoureux (Loving Sabotage), Theater Daniel-Sorano, Vincennes, 2003–2005

With Pauline Foschia, Jeanne Gougeau, Laurence Vielle Adaptation et direction: Brigitte Bailleux, Laurence Vielle

- Cosmétique de l'ennemi (The Enemy's Cosmetique), "La Compagnie des Sept Lieux", Suisse, 2003–2008

With John Durand and Olivier Renault Adaptation and direction: Emmanuel Samatani and Jean-Daniel Uldry

- Les combustibles (Human Rites), Theater Daniel-Sorano, Vincennes, March – April 2008

With Michel Boy, Julie Turin, Grégory Gerrebo Direction: Stéphane Cottin

- Métaphysique des tubes (The Character of Rain), 2007–2009

With Cécile Schletzer and Claire Rieussec Direction: Claire Rieussec

- Hygiène de l'assassin (Hygiene and the Assassin), Theater of Namur and Theater "le Public", Bruxelles, September – October 2008

With Daniel Hanssens, Nathalie Cornet, Valérie Marchand and Vincent Lécuyer Direction: Pierre Santini

- Biographie de la Faim (The Life of Hunger), Theater of "La Place des Martyrs", Bruxelles, April – May 2009

With Nathalie Cornet, Michel Hinderyckx, Jessica Gazon, Stéphanie Blanchoud... Adaptation and direction: Christine Delmotte

- Les Combustibles (Human Rites), Theater of Nesle, Paris, 16 September 2010 – 2 October 2010

With Philippe Doré, Freddy Zimmer, Florine Moreau Direction: Hubert Vinzani

- Stupeur et Tremblements (Fear and Trembling), Theater "Le Petit Hébértot", Paris, 18 March 2011 – 22 May 2011

With Layla Metssitane Adaptation and direction: Layla Metssitane

=== Audio books ===
Eight of Amélie Nothomb's novels were adapted in the form of audio books, the first four were published by the editions "VDB", the others by "Audiolib" :

- Robert des noms propres (=The Book of Proper Names): Amélie Nothomb (author) and Véronique Groux de Miéri (narrator), La Roque-sur-Pernes, "Éditions VDB", 1 March 2003 (ISBN 978-2-84694-068-9) (Note BNF (FRENCH NATIONAL LIBRARY) no FRBNF39186856q).

Support: 3 audio CD (lasted: 3:15 am min, complete text), ref. V.D.B. 008.

- Antéchrista (=Antichrista): Amélie Nothomb (author) and Véronique Groux de Miéri (narrator), La Roque-sur-Pernes, "Éditions VDB", 1 March 2004 (ISBN 978-2-84694-281-2) (Note BNF (FRENCH NATIONAL LIBRARY) no FRBNF412025642).

Support: 3 audio CD (lasted: 2:52 am min, complete text), ref. V.D.B. 033. Musical illustration: Thierry Duhamel.

- Biographie de la faim (=The life of hunger): Amélie Nothomb (author) and Véronique Groux de Miéri (narrator), La Roque-sur-Pernes, "Éditions VDB", 1 March 2005 (ISBN 978-2-84694-281-2) (Note BNF (FRENCH NATIONAL LIBRARY) no FRBNF40227909h).

Support: 4 audio CD (lasted: 4:17 am min, complete text), ref. V.D.B. 074. Musical illustration: Thierry Duhamel.

- Acide sulfurique (=Sulphuric acid): Amélie Nothomb (author) and Véronique Groux de Miéri (narrator), La Roque-sur-Pernes, "Éditions VDB", 1 March 2006 (ISBN 978-2-84694-403-8) (Note BNF (FRENCH NATIONAL LIBRARY) no FRBNF40227903f).

Support: 3 audio CD (lasted: 5:39 am min, complete text), ref. V.D.B. 104. Musical illustration: Thierry Duhamel.

- Ni d'Eve, ni d'Adam (=Tokyo Fiancée): Amélie Nothomb (author) and Sylvie Testud (narrator), Paris, "Audiolib", 13 February 2008 (ISBN 978-2-35641-012-2) (Note BNF (FRENCH NATIONAL LIBRARY) no FRBNF412025642).

Support: 1 audio CD (lasted: 3:50 am min, complete text), ref. Audiolib 25 0012 02.

- Le fait du prince (=The prince's act): Amélie Nothomb (author) and Patrick Waleffe (narrator), Paris, "Audiolib", 21 January 2009 (ISBN 978-2-356-41048-1) (Note BNF (FRENCH NATIONAL LIBRARY) no FRBNF414068348).

Support: 1 audio CD (lasted: 3:00 am min, complete text), ref. Audiolib 25 0049 4.

- Le voyage d'hiver (=The winter journey): Amélie Nothomb (author) and Thibault de Montalembert (narrator), Paris, "Audiolib", 9 September 2009 (ISBN 978-2-35641-093-1) (Note BNF (FRENCH NATIONAL LIBRARY) no FRBNF42044512x).

Support: 2 audio CD (lasted: 1:54 am min, complete text), ref. Audiolib 25 0129 4.

- Une forme de vie (=A form of life): Amélie Nothomb (author) and Frédéric Meaux (narrator), Paris, "Audiolib", 13 October 2010 (ISBN 978-2-356-41245-4) (Note BNF (FRENCH NATIONAL LIBRARY) no FRBNF42285807k).

Support: 1 audio CD (lasted: 2:42 am min, complete text), ref. Audiolib 25 281 3.

== Bibliography (scholarly works about her and about her writing) ==
- Susan Bainbrigge and Jeanette Den Toonder, Amélie Nothomb, Authorship, Identity and Narrative Practice, Peter Lang, 2003. ISBN 0-8204-6182-2
- (fr) Frédérique Chevillot, Amélie Nothomb : L'Invitation à la lecture. Women in French Studies, 2012, vol. 2012, no 1, p. 195-212.
- Mary Jane Cowles, Close Encounters of the Abject Kind: The Intercultural Female Body in Amélie Nothomb's Japan.
- Amaleena Damlé, Making A Body without Organs: Amélie Nothomb's An-Organic Flux of Immanence, ISBN 978-0-748668-21-2.
- (fr) Yolande Helm, Amélie Nothomb : une écriture alimentée à la source de l'orphisme. Religiologiques, Orphée et Eurydice : mythes en mutation, 1997, vol. 15, p. 151-163.
- Anna Kemp, The Child as Artist in Amélie Nothomb's Robert des noms propres. French studies, 2012, vol. 66, no 1, pp. 54–67.
- Mark D. Lee, Les identités d'Amélie Nothomb : de l'invention médiatique aux fantasmes originaires, éd. Rodopi, 2010.
- (fr) Andrea Oberhuber, Réécrire à l'ère du soupçon insidieux : Amélie Nothomb et le récit postmoderne. Études françaises, 2004, vol. 40, no 1, p. 111-128.
- Scott M Powers, Evil in Contemporary French and Francophone Literature, 2014.
