= Éditions Albin Michel =

French publisher

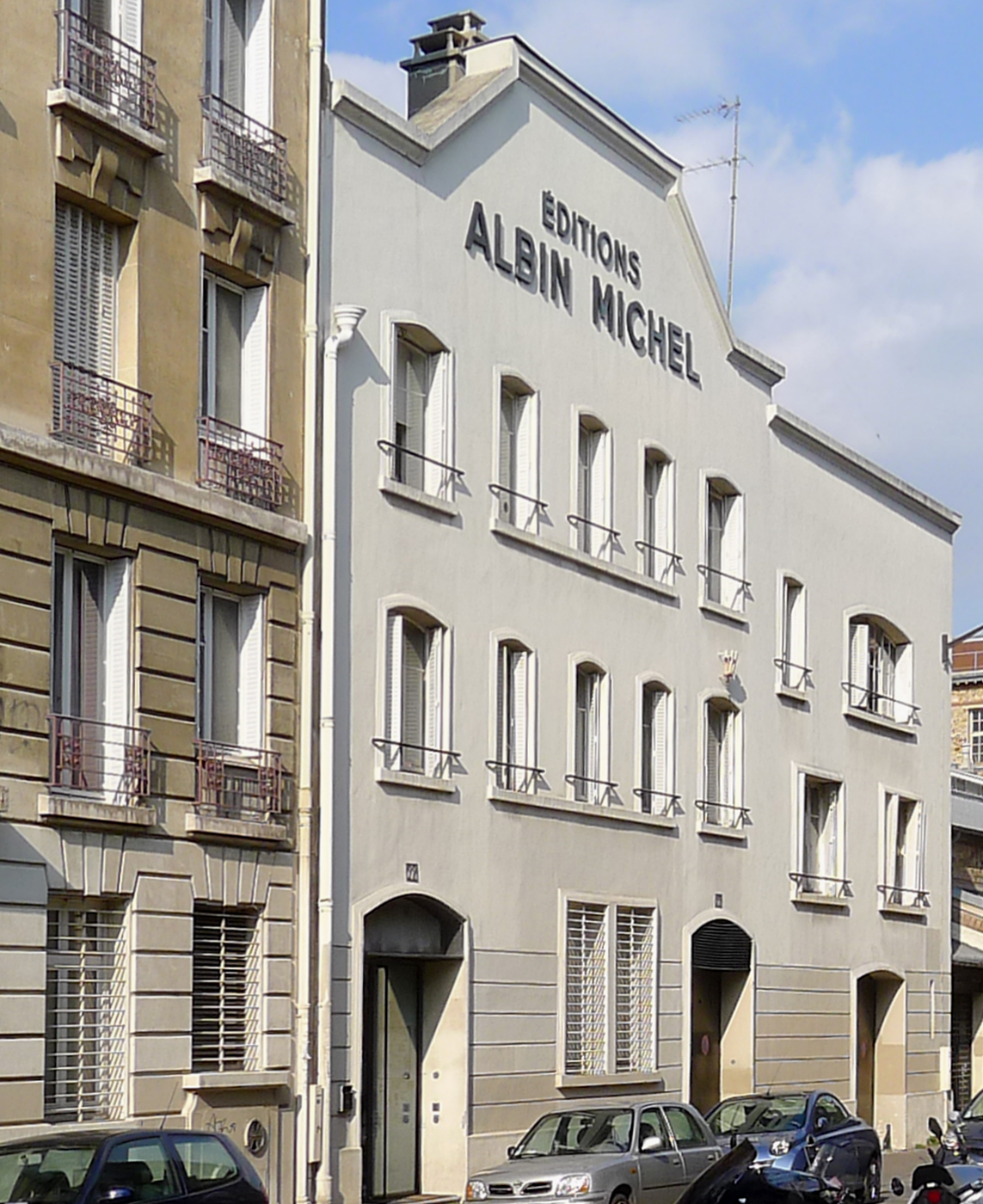
- Founded: 1900
- Founder: Albin Michel
- Country of origin: France
- Headquarters location: Paris
- Publication types: Books
- Official website: albin-michel.fr

Éditions Albin Michel is a French publisher. In January 2019, the new President and CEO is Gilles Haéri. In January 2022, the director is Anna Pavlowitch, the daughter of Paul Pavlowitch.

== History ==
It was founded in 1900 by Albin Michel. They published, first, Romain Rolland, Henri Barbusse, Roland Dorgelès, Henri Pourrat, Vercors, Robert Sabatier, and Didier Van Cauwelaert, Éric-Emmanuel Schmitt, Daphne du Maurier, Mary Higgins Clark, Stephen King or Thomas Harris.

== Critics ==
In 2016, Le Monde criticized the publication of far-right authors as Éric Zemmour, Philippe de Villiers, Patrick Buisson. Robert Ménard, also published by the house and identified as far-right mayor, denounced a bad economic strategy to cancel their contract with Zemmour running for the 2022 French presidential election.

== Authors ==
- Ramona Badescu
- Philip K. Dick
- Louis Lavelle
- Emmanuelle Ménard
- Robert Ménard
- Éric Naulleau
- Irène Némirovsky
- Amélie Nothomb
- Michel Onfray
- Maxence Van Der Meersch
- Philippe de Villiers
- David Walliams
- Bernard Werber, Exit
- Jean-Pierre Willem
- Éric Zemmour

== Collections ==
- Maîtres de la littérature étrangère

== See also ==
- Books in France
