= Maritozzo =

Italian bun

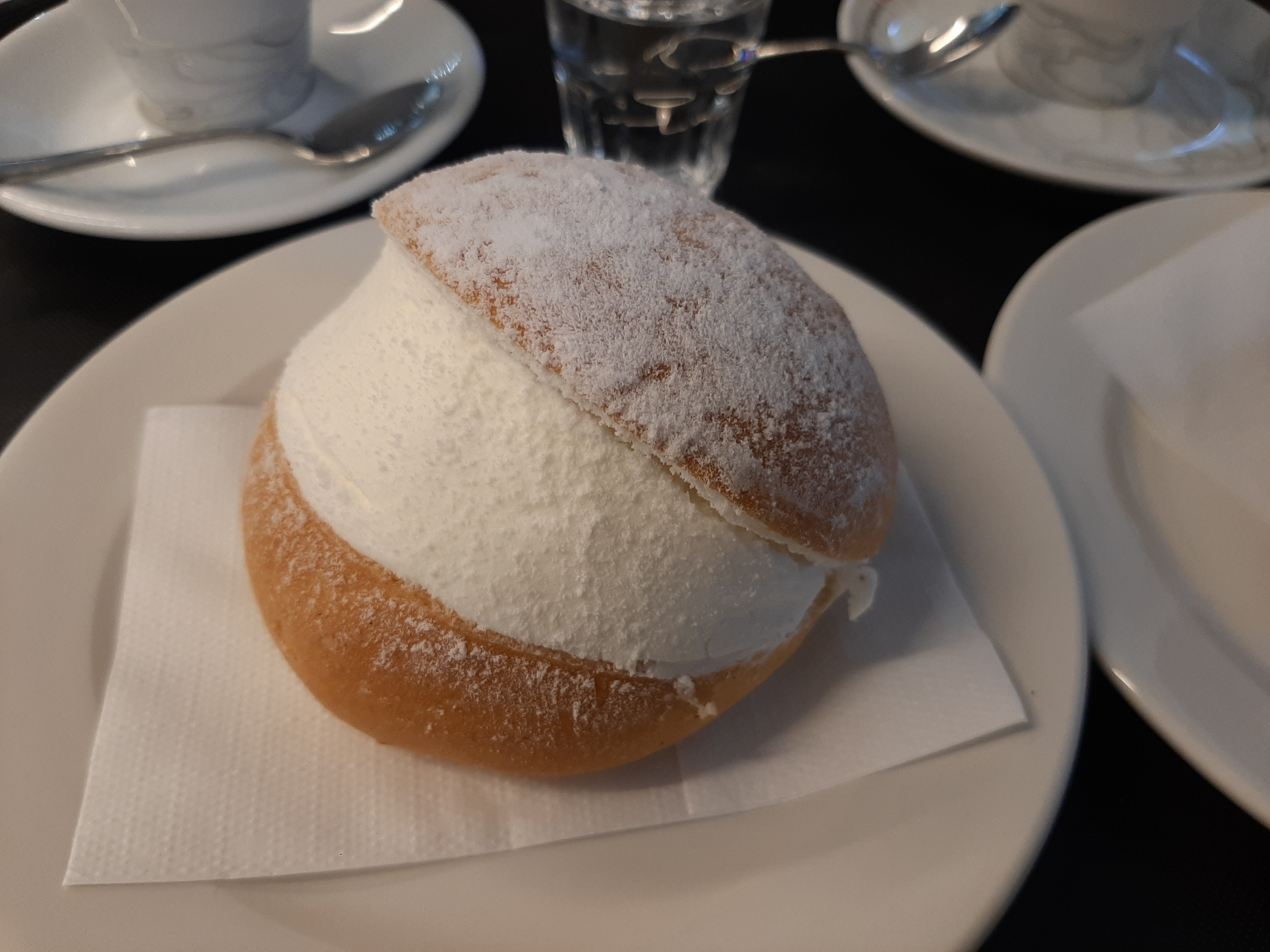
A maritozzo from Reggio Emilia

Maritozzo (plural: maritozzi) is a traditional Italian cream bun consisting of bread filled with a generous amount of whipped cream. Originally, "maritozzo" referred only to the bread part, and the version filled with whipped cream was called maritozzo con la panna, meaning "maritozzo with whipped cream". It is typical of Roman, Marche, and Abruzzo cuisine, while in Puglia and Sicily, the name maritozzo refers instead to a braided sweet bread.

In some variations, pine nuts, raisins, and candied fruits are also added. The maritozzo is also sometimes stuffed with ice cream, often with the taste of vanilla or cream. In Italy, savory versions of these buns are known as maritozzi salati.

Since 2017, the city of Rome celebrates "Maritozzo Day" annually on the first Saturday of December.

== History ==
The origins of the recipe date back to ancient Rome, when the honey-sweetened buns were given to laborers. Its name derives from the custom of men offering this dessert to their girlfriends on the first Friday of March. The future brides who received it as a gift used to call the donor maritozzo (derived from the word for "husband"). On such occasions, the dessert could also hide gifts inside for the beloved, such as a ring or a small jewel.

In Medieval Rome, maritozzi were one of the only sweets permitted during Lent because they could be made with olive oil in place of animal fat without compromising the taste. This version was known as the maritozzo quaresimale ("Lenten bun"), and was given the nickname er santo maritozzo ("the holy maritozzo") in the Romanesco dialect. Giuseppe Gioachino Belli referenced this usage in his sonnet "La Quaresima" in 1833 (La quaresima on Italian Wikisource). He also compares the cream bun to a phallus in his earlier sonnet "Er Padre de li Santi", due to the bun's elongated shape. The writer Giggi Zanazzo further referenced maritozzi in his book Uses, Customs, and Prejudices of the Roman People (Usi, costumi e pregiudizi del popolo di Roma) in 1908.

== Variations ==
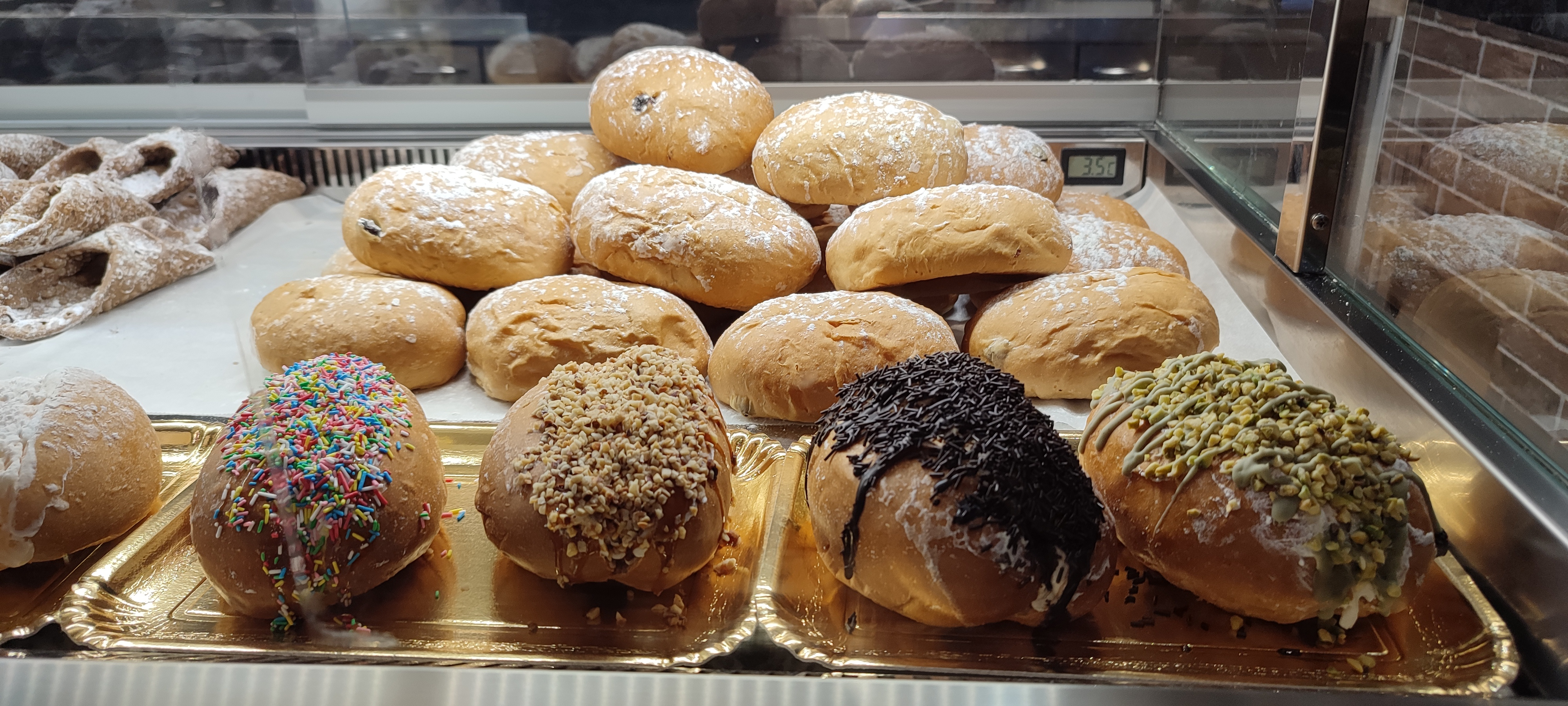
Maritozzi of different flavors on display in Rome

- Maritozzo romano
- Maritozzo romagnolo
- Maritozzo marchigiano-abruzzese
- Maritozzo pugliese e siciliano, a braided sweet bread
- Maritozzo salato, a bun prepared with savory fillings
