= Cream roll =

Cream roll may refer to:

== Food ==
- Cream bun, a sweet bun or bread roll filled with cream
- Swiss roll, a rolled sponge cake filled with cream

== Others ==
- Cream Roll, a mountain of the Kumaon Himalayas.
