= Marco Nica =

Italian actor, director and writer

Marco Nica (born 1973) is an Italian theater and cinema actor, director, writer, and poet.

== Early life and education ==
Marco Nica was born in Rome in 1973. He developed an interest in drama at an early age and began participating in theater in his youth. By his late teens, he became active in Rome's local theater scene.

== Career ==
=== Theatre ===
Nica began directing and acting in stage productions in 1991, frequently presenting works by Italian playwrights such as Eduardo De Filippo, Peppino De Filippo, Dario Fo, and Carlo Goldoni. He became active in Rome's theatre community through comedic and classic productions. One of his original revue shows, Varietà per varie età, revisited five decades of Italian comedy and received the Best Show award at Rome's 2014 "Trastestorie" contemporary playwriting competition. He both directed and performed in the production.

=== Film ===
In 2007, Nica co-conceived and co-wrote the feature film C'era una volta Rugantino, in which he also served as the lead actor. It was inspired by Rome's folk traditions and was included in the Italian national film catalog (ANICA). Later, it also featured on the Rai Tre program Cominciamo Bene – Prima.

=== Literature ===
Nica has written several novels and thrillers, including Ægyptvs (2008), Il tempio dell'Imperatore (2009), and Così è (se mi pare) – Storia di un attore (2010), as well as a novelization of C'era una volta Rugantino (2011). He is also active as a poet, publishing collections in Italian and in the Romanesco dialect. His poetry include the debut collection Senza aver paura (2007) and the dialectal anthology Ahó! – Poesie de Roma mia (2015). The latter has been noted for its portrayal of Roman life and language.

== Awards and recognition ==
- 2007: Concorso Internazionale "Il Saggio"
- 2014: Trastestorie Theater Prize
- 2018: "Luce dell'Arte" National Literary Award
- 2021: Premio Franz Kafka Italia – Immaginazione
- 2023: Premio Internazionale Letteratura Contemporanea
