= Trilussa =

Italian poet (1871–1950)

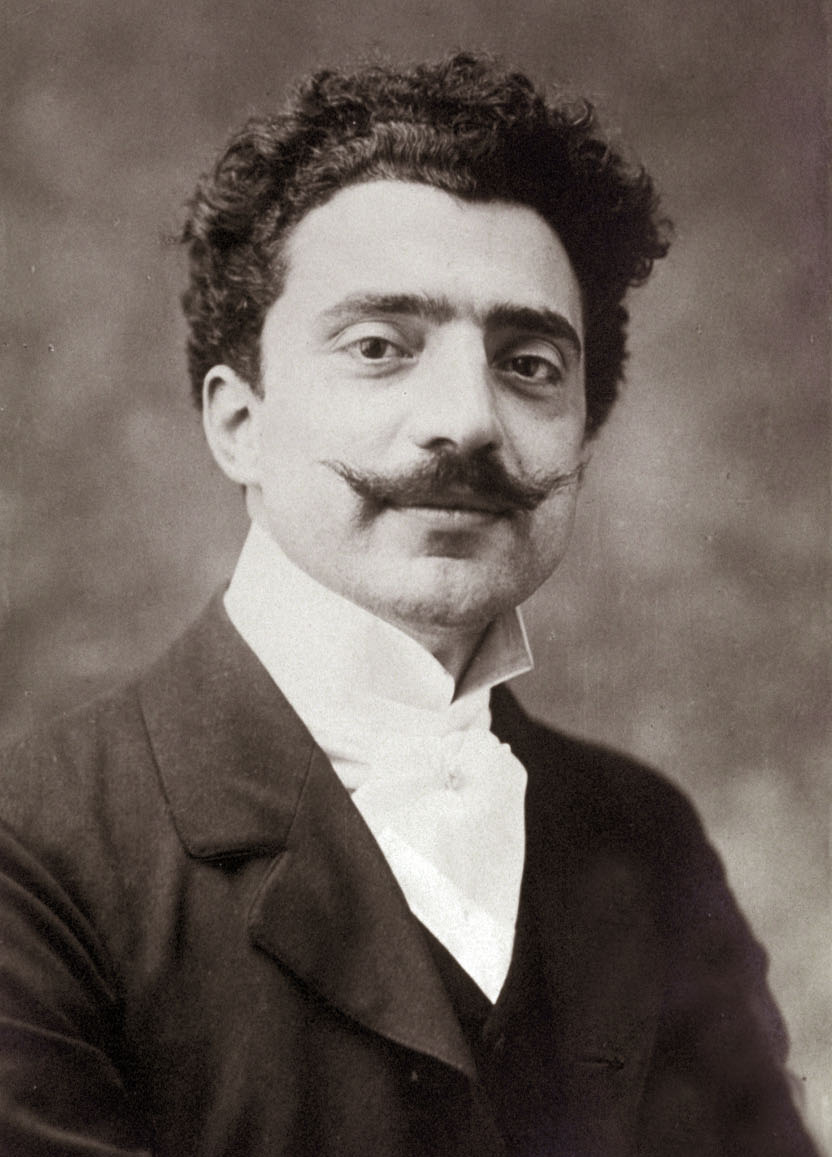
- Trilussa in 1915
- Born: Carlo Alberto Camillo Mariano Salustri; 26 October 1871; Rome, Kingdom of Italy
- Died: 21 December 1950 (aged 79); Rome, Italy
- Occupations: Poet; writer; journalist
- Writing career
- Language: Romanesco dialect

Member of the Senate of the Republic
- Life tenure 1 December 1950 – 21 December 1950
- Appointed by: Luigi Einaudi

Carlo Alberto Camillo Mariano Salustri (26 October 1871 – 21 December 1950), known by the pseudonym Trilussa (an anagram of his last name), was an Italian poet, writer and journalist, particularly known for his works in Romanesco dialect.

== Biography ==
=== Childhood and education (1871–1886) ===
Carlo Alberto Camillo Salustri was born in Rome on 26 October 1871. His father, Vincenzo, was a waiter from Albano Laziale, his mother, Carlotta Poldi, was a Bolognese seamstress. He was the second-born child of the Salustri family and was baptized on 31 October in the Church of San Giacomo in Augusta, when the fourth name, Mariano, was added. A year later, in 1872, at the age of three, his sister, Elisabetta, died of diphtheria. His tormented childhood was affected again two years later, on 1 April 1874, by the death of his father Vincenzo. After the death of her husband, Carlotta Poldi decided to move with her son Carlo to Via Ripetta, where they stayed for only eleven months, before moving again to the palace in Piazza di Pietra, belonging to the Marquis Ermenegildo del Cinque, Carlo's godfather. It is believed that Carlo owes his acquaintance with Filippo Chiappini, a Romanesco poet and disciple of Belli, to the Marquis; indeed, Chiappini's sonnet Ar marchese Riminigirdo Der Cinque (To the Marquis Riminigirdo Der Cinque), addressed to Trilussa's godfather, seems to be referring to Carlotta Poldi and her son in the last triplet.

(Romanesco) «S'aricordi de me: non facci sciupo de la salute sua, ch'adesso è bbona, un zaluto a Ccarlotta e un bacio ar pupo.»	(IT) «Si ricordi di me: non rovini la sua salute, che adesso è buona, un saluto a Carlotta e un bacio al bambino.»	(EN) "Remember me: do not ruin your health, that now is good, a greeting to Carlotta and a kiss to her son."

(Filippo Chiappini, Ar marchese Riminigirdo Der Cinque)

In 1877 Carlotta enrolled her son in the San Nicola municipal schools, where Carlo attended first and second grade. Then, in October 1880, he took the examination for admission to the Collegio Poli of the Brothers of the Christian Schools, but having made a simple mistake in subtraction, he was forced to repeat the second year. Because of his negligence and lack of commitment, he had to repeat the third grade and then, in 1886, he abandoned formal studies for good, despite the pressure of his mother, his uncle Marco Salustri and Professor Chiappini, who insisted that Carlo continue to study.

An article in the Corriere della Sera of 7 November 2020, in the sports pages, shows a photo of Trilussa next to that of a young athlete captured wearing the Lazio Sports Club jersey. The two are almost identical: the photo was in fact taken inside the Casina dell'Uccelliera in Villa Borghese between 1906 and 1913, the site of the former official headquarters of the sports club. Trilussa, a well-known freemason, knew all the directors of the Lazio Sports Club and was friends with Giggi Zanazzo and Nino Ilari, well-known poets and playwrights who were regulars at the club. Sandro Ciotti, a well-known Lazio youth footballer, Lazio fan and future sports broadcaster born in Rome, had Trilussa as his godfather.

=== Debut and the Stelle de Roma (1887–1890) ===
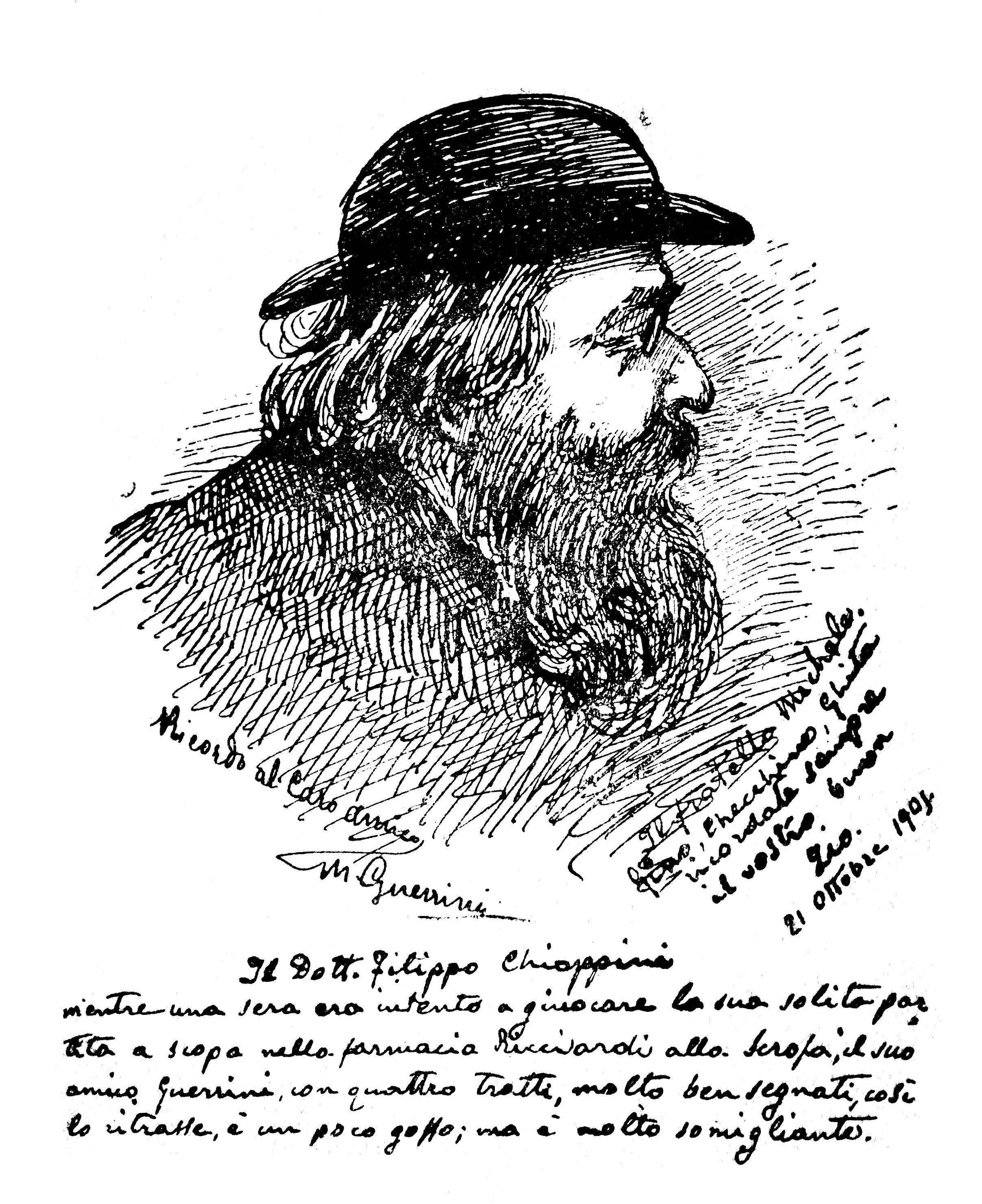
Portrait of Filippo Chiappini, Trilussa's mentor, who insisted that Trilussa continue his studies. In a letter to his mother Carlotta he wrote: "Send him to take this exam in Rieti, Terni or some other town where he will not have to suffer a humiliation that would be painful for him, and when he comes back here with his licence have him enrol in the Institute and let him study accountancy. With three years at the Institute, he can get his technical license and can get a government job [...] Don't tell me it's late, because it's not true."

In 1887, at the age of sixteen, he presented one of his poems to Giggi Zanazzo, the dialectal poet director of Rugantino, asking for it to be published. The sonnet, inspired by Belli, entitled L'invenzione della stampa (The Invention of Printing), begins with Johann Gutenberg's invention and ends with a criticism of contemporary printing in the final tercets:

(Romanesco) «Cusì successe, caro patron Rocco, Che quanno annavi ne le libbrerie Te portavi via n' libbro c'un baijocco. Mentre mo ce so' tante porcherie De libri e de giornali che pe n' sordo Dicono un frego de minchionerie.»	(IT) «Così succedeva, caro patron Rocco, che quando andavi nelle librerie acquistavi un libro con cinque centesimi. Mentre adesso ci sono tanti libri e giornali fatti male che per cinque centesimi dicono moltissime sciocchezze.»	(EN) "So it used to be, dear patron Rocco, when you went to bookshops you could buy a book for five cents. Whereas now there are many bad books and newspapers that for five cents say a lot of nonsense."

(Trilussa, L'invenzione della stampa)

Zanazzo agreed to publish the sonnet, which appeared in the edition of 30 October 1887, signed at the bottom with the pseudonym Trilussa. From this first publication he began an assiduous collaboration with the Roman periodical, thanks also to the support and encouragement of Edoardo Perino, editor of Rugantino, which would lead the young Trilussa to publish, between 1887 and 1889, fifty poems and forty-one prose works.

Among the many poems printed between the pages of Rugantino, the Stelle de Roma (Stars of Rome), a series of about thirty madrigals, that paid homage to some of the most beautiful young women in Rome, were a resounding success. Starting with the first stella, published on 3 June 1888, the poems dedicated to Roman women gradually gained such popularity that they involved the entire Rugantino editorial staff. Several authors, hiding behind pseudonyms, would try their hand at writing poems entitled to stelle along the lines of those of Trilussa. The popularity of his compositions led Trilussa to select twenty of them and, after revising them and making substantial changes, to publish them in his first collection of poems, Stelle de Roma. Versi romaneschi (Stars of Rome, Roman verses), published in 1889 by Cerroni and Solaro. However, his sudden popularity brought with it criticism from Belli's disciples, who attacked him for the themes he dealt with and accused him of using the Romanesco dialect combined with Italian. Among them was Filippo Chiappini himself, who, under the pseudonym Mastro Naticchia, mocked his pupil by means of two poems published in Rugantino.

After his first work was published, his collaborations with Rugantino decreased in frequency; however, Trilussa remained strongly tied to the publisher Perino, with whom, in 1890, he published the almanac Er Mago de Bborgo. Lunario pe' 'r 1890 (The Village Magician. 1980 Almanac). It is a revival of the eponymous almanac conceived in 1859 by the Roman poet Adone Finardi, produced in collaboration with Francesco Sabatini, known as Padron Checco, and the illustrator Adriano Minardi, alias Silhouette. Trilussa wrote for the almanac a sonnet for each month of the year, with the addition of a closing composition and some prose in Roman dialect.

=== The Don Chisciotte and the Favole Rimodernate (1891–1900) ===
The experience of the almanac was repeated the following year with Er Mago de Bborgo. Lunario pe' 'r 1891 (The Village Magician: 1891 Almanac): this time the texts are all by Trilussa, without the collaboration of Francesco Sabatini, but accompanied again by Silhouette's drawings. In the meantime, the Roman poet collaborated with various periodicals, publishing poems and prose in Il Ficcanaso. Almanacco popolare con caricature per l'anno 1890, Il Cicerone and La Frusta (The Meddler. Popular Almanac with Caricatures for the year 1890, The Cicerone, and The Whip). However, Trilussa's most important collaboration came in 1891, when he began writing for the Don Chisciotte della Mancia, a daily newspaper with national circulation, alternating satirical articles targeting Crispi's politics with city chronicles. His production for the paper thickened in 1893, when the newspaper changed its name to Il Don Chisciotte di Roma, and Trilussa, at the age of twenty-two, joined the newspaper's editorial board.

It was during this period that Trilussa prepared the publication of his second volume of poems, Quaranta sonetti romaneschi (Forty Roman Sonnets), a collection which, despite its name, contains forty-one sonnets, selected mainly from recent publications in Il Don Chisciotte di Roma and partly from the older poems published in Rugantino; the collection, published in 1894, marked the beginning of the collaboration between Trilussa and the Roman publisher Voghera, a relationship that would continue for the next twenty-five years.

It was on Luigi Arnaldo Vassallo's newspaper that the fable-writer Trilussa was born, between 1885 and 1899: twelve of the poet's fables appeared in Don Chisciotte; the first among them was La Cecala e la Formica (The Cicada and the Ant), published on 29 November 1895, which, in addition to being the first fable ever written, and the first by Trilussa, is also the first of the so-called Favole Rimodernate (Modernised Tales), which Diego De Miranda, the editor of the column Tra piume e strascichi, in which the fable was published, thus announced:

«Favole antiche colla morale nuova. Trilussa, da qualche tempo, non pubblica sonetti: non li pubblica perché li studia. Si direbbe che, acquistando la coscienza della sua maturità intellettuale, il giovane scrittore romanesco senta il dovere di dare la giusta misura di sé, di ciò che può, della originalità del suo concepimento. E osserva e tenta di fare diversamente da quanto ha fatto finora. E ha avuto un'idea, fra l'altro, arguta e geniale: quella di rifare le favole antiche di Esopo per metterci la morale corrente.»	"Ancient fables with new morals. Trilussa has not published sonnets for some time: he does not publish them because he studies them. One would say that, acquiring the consciousness of his intellectual maturity, the young Roman writer feels the duty to give the right measure of himself, of what he can, of the originality of his conception. And he observes and attempts to do differently from what he has done so far. And he has had an idea, among other things, witty and ingenious: that of remaking Aesop's ancient fables to put in current morals."

(Diego De Miranda)

When De Miranda said that the Roman poet was no longer publishing sonnets because he was studying them, he was probably referring to the collection that Trilussa was preparing, and of which he was aware, which would see daylight only in 1898, printed by Tipografia Folchetto under the title Altri sonetti. Preceduti da una lettera di Isacco di David Spizzichino, strozzino (Other Sonnets. Preceded by a Letter of Isacco di David Spizzichino, Usurer). The curious title of the work originated from an episode that biographers consider real: Trilussa, in financial difficulties, asked Isacco di David Spizzichino, a moneylender, for a loan, guaranteeing to pay him back after the publication of his next book. But the book was late to be published, and Isacco sent a peremptory letter to the poet; Trilussa decided to report the story with the cheerfulness and irony that always distinguished him: he included in the collection a dedication to his usurer and the intimidating letter as a preface to the work.

In the meantime, the Roman poet began to become declaimer of his own verses, which he recited in cultural circles, theatres, aristocratic salons, and cafè-concerts, Trilussa's favourite places, symbols of the Belle Époque. Without knowing German, in 1898 Trilussa ventured on his first foreign experience to Berlin, accompanied by the transformist Leopoldo Fregoli.

=== Elocutionist Trilussa (1901–1914) ===
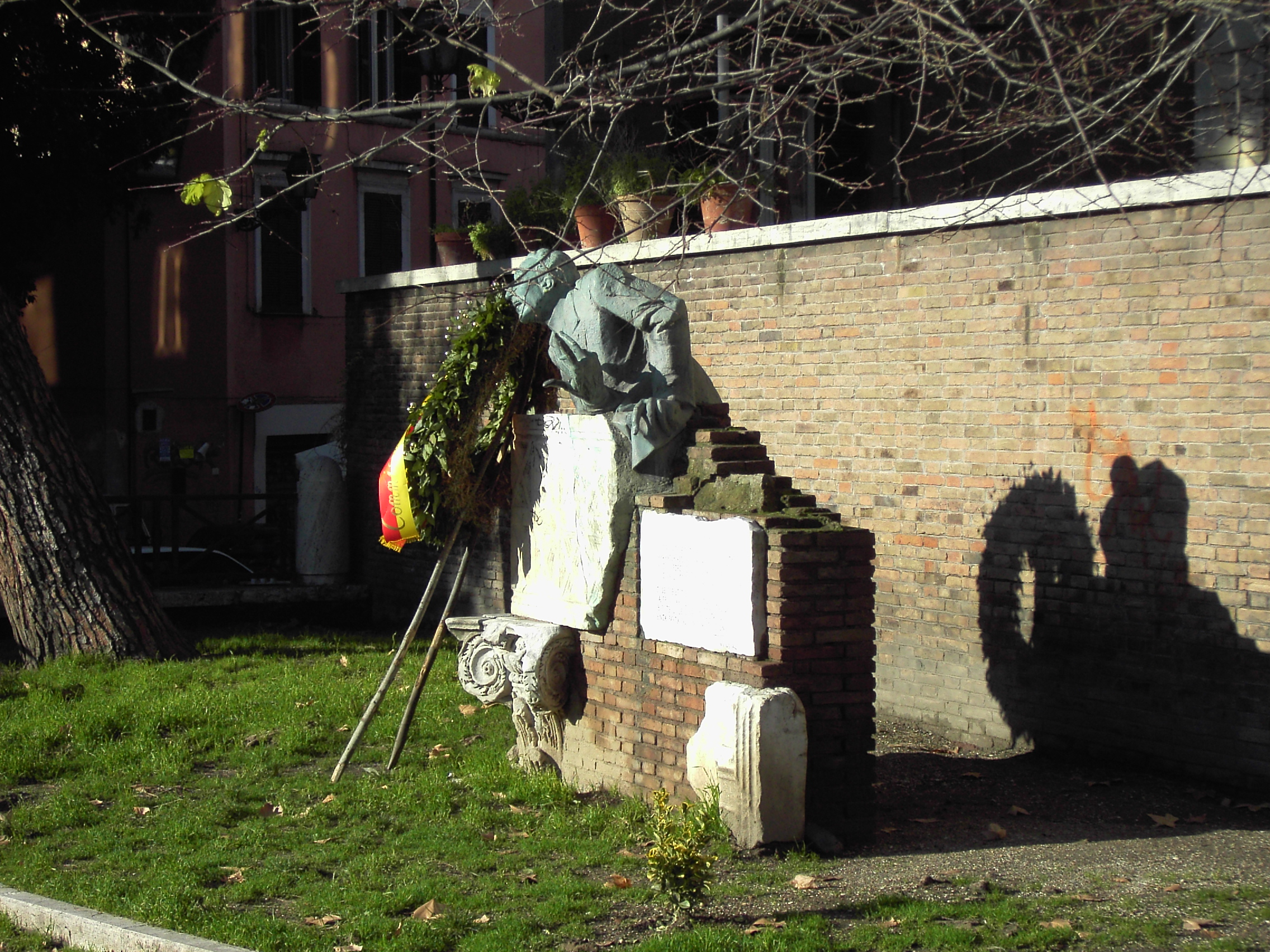
Monument to Trilussa, in the homonymous square in Rome between Trastevere and Ponte Sisto.

In the wake of his success, he began to frequent 'salons' as a poet-commentator on the day's events. During the Fascist period, he avoided joining the Fascist Party, but preferred to define himself as a non-fascist rather than an anti-fascist. Although he made political satire, his relations with the regime were always calm and marked by mutual respect. In 1922, Arnoldo Mondadori Editore began publishing all his collections. Also in 1922, the writer joined Arcadia under the pseudonym of Tibrindo Plateo, which was also that of Belli.

He was godfather to the journalist and sports radio reporter Sandro Ciotti. The President of the Republic Luigi Einaudi appointed Trilussa senator for life on 1 December 1950, twenty days before he died (in one of the first issues of Epoca dedicated to the news of his death in 1950, could be read that the poet, long since ill, and prescient of the imminent end, had commented with unchanged irony: "They have appointed me senator to death"; the fact remains that Trilussa, although seventy-nine at the time of his death, insisted, with old-fashioned coquetry, on declaring that he was 73).

His last words, pronounced almost in a whisper to his faithful maid Rosa Tomei, seem to have been: "I'm leaving now". The maid, however, told the journalist of "Epoca" who interviewed her: "I was sewing a new scarf, now he won't need it anymore". He died on December 21, 1950, the same day of Giuseppe Gioachino Belli, another Roman poet, and Giovanni Boccaccio. He was almost two meters tall, as evidenced by the photos accompanying the news of his death, published by the Mondadori weekly Epoca in 1950.

He was a freemason.

He is buried in the historic Verano Cemetery in Rome, behind the Pincetto wall on the Caracciolo ramp. Engraved on the marble book on his tomb there is the poem Felicità (Happiness). The collection of Tutte le poesie (Collected Poems) was published posthumously in 1951, edited by Pietro Pancrazi, and with drawings by the author.

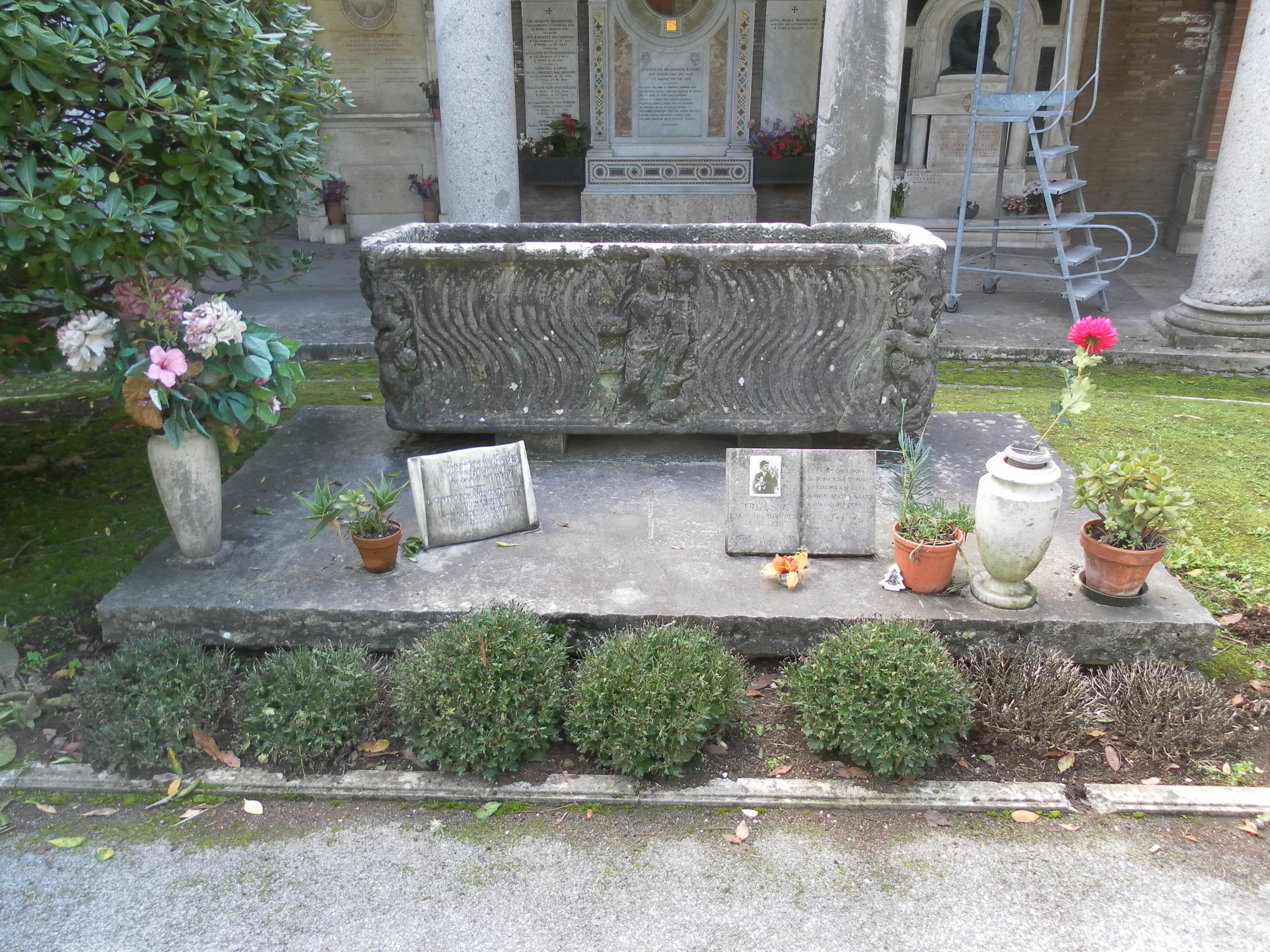
The poet's tomb at the monumental cemetery of Verano, in Rome.

== Style and themes ==
=== Socio-political satire ===
In witty language, barely rippled by his bourgeois dialect, Trilussa commented on around fifty years of Roman and Italian news, from the Giolittian era to the years of fascism and the post-war years. The corruption of politicians, the fanaticism of hierarchs and the scheming of the powerful are some of his favourite targets. In some of his poems, such as Er venditore de pianeti, Trilussa also manifested a certain patriotism of the Risorgimento type.

However, satire, conducted with a certain political apathy and scepticism, is not the only motif that inspires Trilussian poetry: there are frequent moments of crepuscular melancholy, disconsolate reflection, here and there corrected by flashes of irony, on withering loves, on the loneliness that makes old age bitter and empty (the models in this case are Lorenzo Stecchetti and Guido Gozzano).

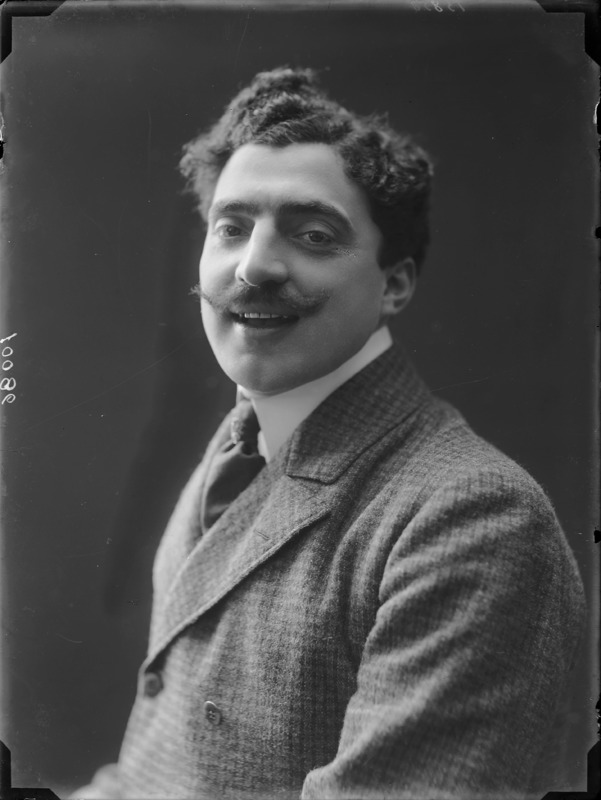
Trilussa

The key to accessing and reading Trilussa's satire can be found in fables. Like other fable writers, he also had something to teach, however, his moral was never generic or vague, but linked to the real-time comments on the issues of life. He was not satisfied with his happy endings; therefore, he pursued his own amusement already during text composition and, of course, that of the reader to whom the product was addressed.

=== The Romanesco poet ===
Trilussa was the third great dialect Roman poet to appear on the scene from the nineteenth century onwards: while Belli, with his expressive realism, drew fully from the language of the lowest strata and turned it into short, memorable sonnets, Pascarella proposed the language of the United Italy commoner, who typically aspires to culture and middle class, integrated into a narrative of a wider scope. Trilussa devised a language even closer to Italian, in an attempt to enhance Belli's vernacular. Trilussa replaced popular Rome with bourgeois Rome, and historical satire with the humour of the daily chronicle.

In particular, Trilussa has the ability to highlight people's pettiness and weaknesses through incisive and biting metaphors, often based on episodes involving domestic animals. This is the case of the well-known sonnet Er cane moralista (The Judgemental Dog) in which the initial censorious and critical attitude towards reprehensible behaviour is followed by a finale in which accommodation and mutual interest recall common dynamics of human behaviour.

== Works ==
Between 1887 and 1950, Trilussa initially published his poems in newspapers and later collected them in volumes. This allowed him to immediately gather the readers' opinions, as well as to show them the artistic rendering of his compositions at a first draft. It was only afterwards that he selected and refined his poems, discarding those that were less up-to-date and making stylistic, metrical, and linguistic interventions. This second phase made his collections not a simple re-proposition of poems scattered on the pages of newspapers, but real books of poems, perfected and, when necessary, renewed in relation to the social context.

- Stelle de Roma. Versi romaneschi, 1889.
- Er Mago de Bborgo. Lunario pe' 'r 1890, 1890.
- Er Mago de Bborgo. Lunario pe' 'r 1891, 1891.
- Quaranta sonetti romaneschi, 1894.
- Altri sonetti. Preceduti da una lettera di Isacco di David Spizzichino, strozzino, 1898.
- Favole romanesche, Roma, Enrico Voghera, 1901.
- Caffè-concerto, Roma, Enrico Voghera, 1901.
- Er serrajo, Roma, Enrico Voghera, 1903.
- Sonetti romaneschi, Roma, Enrico Voghera, 1909.
- Nove poesie, Roma, Enrico Voghera, 1910 (online).
- Roma nel 1911: l'Esposizione vista a volo di cornacchia: sestine umoristiche, Roma,1911.
- Le storie, Roma, Enrico Voghera, 1913.
- Ommini e bestie, Roma, Enrico Voghera, 1914.
- La vispa Teresa, Roma, Carra, 1917.
- ...A tozzi e bocconi: Poesie giovanili e disperse, Roma, Carra, 1918.
- Le finzioni della vita. Rocca San Casciano, Licinio Cappelli, 1918.
- Lupi e agnelli, Roma, Enrico Voghera, 1919.
- Le cose, Roma-Milano, A. Mondadori, 1922.
- I sonetti, Milano, A. Mondadori, 1922.
- La Gente, Milano, A. Mondadori, 1927.
- Picchiabbò, ossia La moje der ciambellano: spupazzata dall'autore stesso, Roma, Edizioni d'arte Fauno, 1927.
- Libro n. 9, Milano, A. Mondadori, 1930.
- Evviva Trastevere: poesie, bozzetti, storia della festa de nojantri, varietà, Trilussa e altri, Roma, Autocultura, 1930.
- La porchetta bianca, Milano, A. Mondadori, 1930.
- Giove e le bestie, Milano, A. Mondadori, 1932.
- Cento favole, Milano, A. Mondadori, 1934.
- Libro muto, Milano, A. Mondadori, 1935.
- Le favole, Milano, A. Mondadori, 1935.
- Duecento sonetti, A. Milano, Mondadori, 1936.
- Sei favole di Trilussa: commentate da Guglielmo Guasta Veglia (Guasta), Bari, Laterza e Polo, 1937.
- Mamma primavera: favole di Trilussa: con commento di Guglielmo Guasta Veglia: disegni di Giobbe, Bari, Laterza e Polo, 1937.
- Lo specchio e altre poesie, Milano, A. Mondadori, 1938.
- La sincerità e altre fiabe nove e antiche, Milano, A. Mondadori, 1939.
- Acqua e vino, Roma, A. Mondadori, 1945.
- Le prose del Rugantino e del Don Chisciotte e altre prose, Anne-Christine Faitrop Porta, Roma, Salerno, 1992.

== Citations and influences ==
Many of Trilussa's compositions have been used on several occasions by other artists as lyrics for their own songs, sometimes reinterpreting them. Some examples:

- Ninna nanna della guerra, revisited by Maria Monti, on popular music.
- Ninna nanna della guerra, for many years Claudio Baglioni's masterpiece under the title Ninna nanna nanna ninna, especially in live albums (see his discography).

A reference to the satire on "chickens" can be found in the song Penelope by Jovanotti, in the line "Se io mangio due polli e tu nessuno, statisticamente noi ne abbiamo mangiato uno per uno" (If I eat two chickens and you none, statistically we have eaten one for one).

Examples of the use of his verses can also be found in cólta music. Alfredo Casella, for instance, set some fables in Romanesco dialect to music (Er coccodrillo, La carità, Er gatto e er cane, L'elezzione der presidente).

Actor Luca Ward performed five poems in the album Echi de Roma - Omaggio a Trilussa set to music by Andrea Montepaone (another five are sung by Alessandro Pitoni).

The poem La fede (Faith) was taken up and reused by Pope John Paul I to develop one of the letters contained in the book Illustrissimi. Luciani, as in the poem, asks himself about faith: about what it is and why some people feel it ardently, while others do not have it at all. Luciani then adds some references to Manzoni. Pope John Paul I (Albino Luciani) recited one of his poems, La Fede, at a Wednesday audience during his brief pontificate in 1978.

=== Musicals based on his texts ===
- Alipio Calzelli, Il balbuziente: versi di Trilussa, Napoli, Bideri.
- Angelo Vagnetti, Un cameriere filosofo: versi di Trilussa: musica di A. Vagnetti, Napoli, Bideri, 1903.
- Virgilio Brancali, La ninna nanna della guerra: canto e piano: versi di Trilussa, Roma, Casa Musicale Italiana, 1917.
- Costantino Lombardo, Voci lontane: Poemetto per voci e orchestra: versi di Trilussa, Roma, Tip. Danesi, 1917.
- Alfredo Casella, Quattro favole romanesche di Trilussa musicate per canto e pianoforte, Milano, G. Ricordi, 1924.
- Cesare Franco, Bolla de sapone: lirica per soprano o tenore con accompagnamento di pianoforte od orchestra: op. 46: versi di Trilussa, Bari, Raffaello Leo, 1930.
- Agostino Zanchetta, Er chirichetto: per canto e pianoforte: parole di Trilussa, Bologna, U. Pizzi Edit. Tip., 1931.
- E. Sc. Skeletti, La felicità: per canto e pianoforte: versi di Trilussa, Milano, G. Ricordi, 1937.
- E. Sc. Skeletti, La quercia: per canto e pianoforte: versi di Trilussa, Milano, G. Ricordi, 1937.
- E. Sc. Skeletti, La bocca: per canto e pianoforte: versi di Trilussa, Milano, G. Ricordi, 1938.
- Mario Pilati, La tartaruga: per canto e pianoforte: poesia di Trilussa (da Le favole), Milano, G. Ricordi, 1940.
- Giuseppe Micheli, Trilussa aroma de Roma: testi di Trilussa: musiche originali di G. Micheli, Milano, Usignolo, 1976.
- Celestino Eccher, Sette canzoncine per bambini: su testi di Trilussa, Trento, Federazione cori del Trentino, 2000.
- Echi de Roma - Omaggio a Trilussa, album with poems recited by Luca Ward and sung by Alessandro Pitoni, original music by Andrea Montepaone, Rome, Publishing FM Records, 2025.

=== TV miniseries ===
Rai 1 broadcast in the evenings of 11 and 12 March 2013 the miniseries in two episodes, starring Michele Placido, Trilussa - Storia d'amore e di poesia.

== Sources ==
- Corsi, M. (1968). Ecco Trilussa. Cosmopolita.
- D'Arrigo, G. (1968). Trilussa: il tempo, i luoghi, l'opera. Arti Grafiche Scalia.
- Dell'Arco, M. (1951). Lunga vita di Trilussa. Bardi.
- Desiato, L. (2004) C'era una volta a Roma Trilussa. Mondadori.
- Di Massa, S. (1946). Trilussa lirico. Danesi.
- Escobar, M. (Ed.). (1957) Prosa e poesia romanesca: dalle origini a Trilussa. Cappelli.
- Faitrop-Porta, C. A. (1979). Trilussa: doppio volto di un uomo e di un'opera. Istituto di studi romani.
- Frapiselli, F. (2001). Trilussa con noi. Bardi.
- Jannattoni, L. (1979). Roma fine ottocento. Trilussa dal madrigale alla favola. Newton Compton.
- Luigi, C. (1945). Trilussa aneddotico. F. Mondini.
- Mariani, G. (1974). Trilussa: Storia di un poeta. Bonacci.
- Paratore, E. (1972). Trilussa: nel centenario della nascita. Istituto di studi romani.
- Pericoli Ridolfini, C. (1974). Disegni inediti di Trilussa. Galleria L'agostiniana.
- Pettinicchio, D. (2012). Concordanze delle poesie di Trilussa. il Cubo.
- Sorge, M. (1939). De Belli à Trilussa, la portée humaine de la poésie en dialecte romain. Droz.
- Trilussa. (1994). Poesie, (C. Rendina Ed.). Newton Compton, 1994.
- Trilussa. (2012). Tutte le poesie. (C. Costa, L. Felici Eds.). Arnoldo Mondadori Editore.
- Vaccaro, G. (1994). Vocabolario romanesco trilussiano-italiano. il Cubo.
- Arolà (2021). Trilussa, Aesop of Rome. Troubador.
