= ABBA ABBA =

1977 novel by Anthony Burgess

- First edition
- Author: Anthony Burgess
- Language: English
- Genre: Historical novel
- Publisher: Faber and Faber
- Publication date: May 1977
- Publication place: United Kingdom
- Media type: Print (Hardback & Paperback)
- Pages: 128 pp
- ISBN: 0-571-11125-4 (hardback edition)
- OCLC: 3306533
- Dewey Decimal: 823/.9/14
- LC Class: PZ4.B953 Ab PR6052.U638

ABBA ABBA is the 22nd novel by English author Anthony Burgess, published in 1977. It consists of two parts: the first is about the last months in the life of John Keats and his encounters with the Roman (dialectal) poet Giuseppe Gioacchino Belli. The second presents an English translation of a sequence of blasphemous sonnets by Belli.

The title refers to the enclosed rhyme scheme, commonly used by both Keats and Belli; it can also refer to Christ's prayer in the garden of Gethsemane, prior to his agony ("Abba" means "father"). It is the epitaph on Burgess's marble memorial stone, behind which the vessel with his remains is kept, in Monte Carlo. 'AB' are also Anthony Burgess' initials.

== Synopsis ==
In Part One, Keats has various adventures, meeting Belli in the Sistine Chapel, Pauline Bonaparte (sister of Napoleon) in the Pincio, and a Roman man of letters named Giovanni Gulielmi.

Part Two consists of about seventy (from a total of 2,279) amusingly blasphemous sonnets by Belli, purportedly translated by one Joseph Joachim Wilson, a descendant of Gulielmi. An elaborate passage describes how the Italian Gulielmis were transformed into English Wilsons "during a wave of anti-Italian feeling occasioned by alleged ice-cream poisoning in the 1890s in the Lancashire coastal resorts of Blackpool, Cleveleys, Bispham and Fleetwood".

== Authorship ==
Belli was a real person but Giovanni Gulielmi and his descendant Joseph Joachim Wilson are fictional. Wilson's name is a thinly veiled allusion to Burgess's real name, John Anthony Burgess Wilson, but the Belli translations are in fact by Burgess's Italian wife, Liana Burgess.

== Characters ==
- John Keats – the poet
- Giuseppe Gioacchino Belli – the Roman dialectal poet
- Pauline Bonaparte – Napoleon's sister
