= Hong Kong cream bun =

Chinese bun

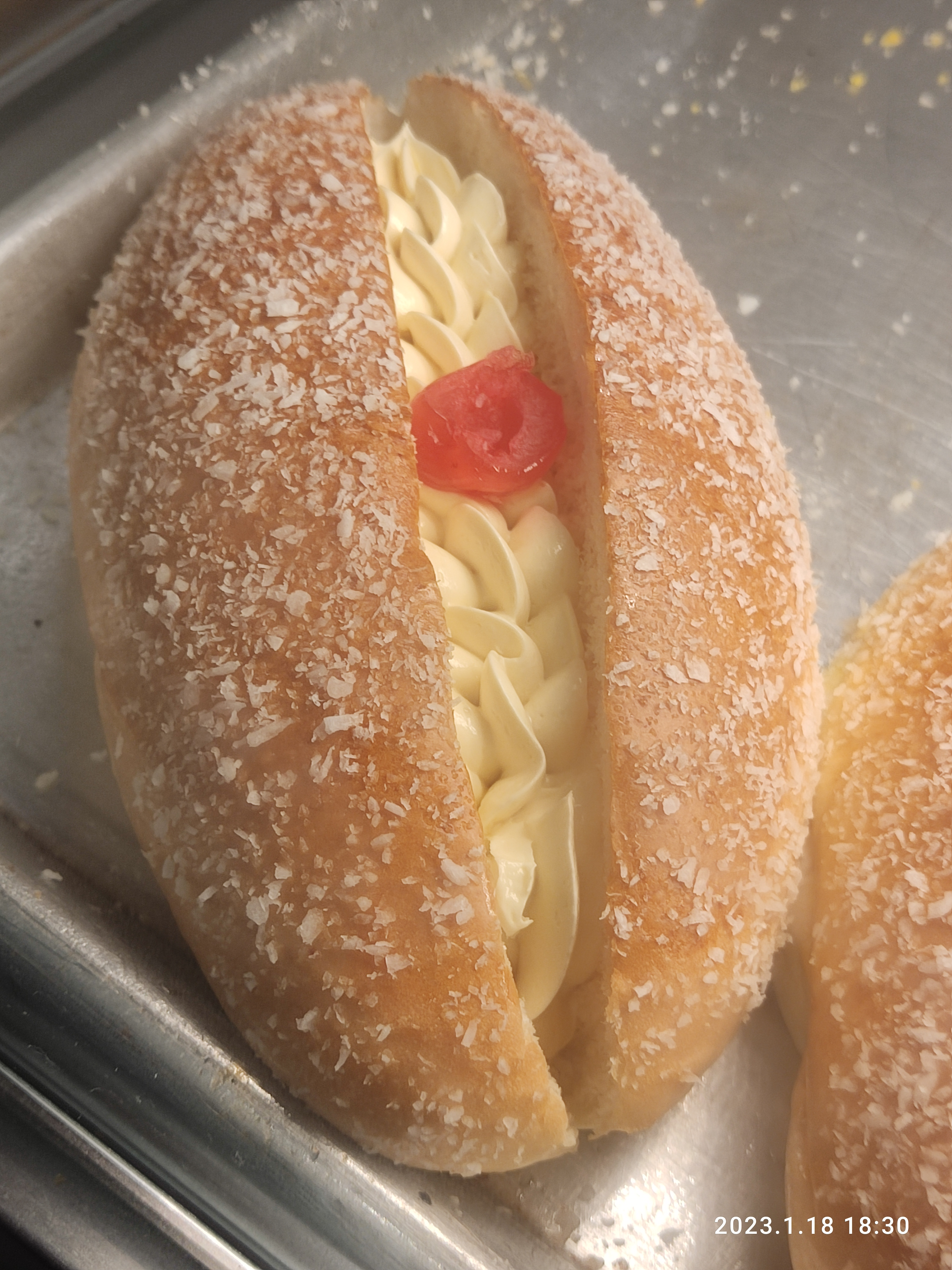
Hong Kong coconut cream bun

The Hong Kong cream bun (Chinese: 奶油包) is a type of sweet roll. It is a common sweet roll in Hong Kong and can also be found in most bakeries in Chinatowns abroad. The oval-shaped cream bun is traditionally filled with sweetened buttercream in the center with shredded coconut sprinkled on the outside.

== History ==
After World War II, Hong Kong saw a boom in local Chinese-owned bakeries that adapted Western baking techniques to Chinese tastes. The cream bun emerged during this period as a soft milk bread roll, split or filled with sweet buttercream or custard-style cream, which was affordable and filling for working families.
