= Il Marchese del Grillo =

- Directed by: Mario Monicelli
- Written by: Bernardino Zapponi, Leo Benvenuti, Piero De Bernardi, Mario Monicelli, Alberto Sordi, Tullio Pinelli
- Produced by: Luciano De Feo (Opera Film Produzione)
- Starring: Alberto Sordi, Paolo Stoppa, Flavio Bucci, Camillo Milli, Riccardo Billi
- Cinematography: Sergio D'Offizi
- Edited by: Ruggero Mastroianni
- Music by: Nicola Piovani
- Distributed by: Gaumont Distribution
- Release date: 1981
- Running time: 139 minutes 127 minutes ca. (cut edition)
- Countries: Italy; France
- Language: Italian

Il Marchese del Grillo (The Marquess del Grillo, internationally released as The Marquis of Grillo) is a 1981 Italian comedic motion picture directed by Mario Monicelli, starring Alberto Sordi as the title character. The film depicts early nineteenth-century episodes in the life of a nobleman in Rome. Loosely based on folkloric accounts of the real Onofrio del Grillo (who lived in the eighteenth century), this character plays a number of pranks, one even involving Pope Pius VII. The famous line Io sò io, e voi non siete un cazzo ("I am who I am, and you are fucking nobody"), is appropriated from Belli's 1831 sonnet, "The Sovrans of the Old World".

== Plot ==
Rome, Year of our Lord 1809. The Pope Pius VII with his cardinals and ministers manages both temporal and spiritual power of the Papal States in Italy. The Marquis Onofrio del Grillo is one of his favorites, but even the worst of all the nobility. As a privileged and protected nobleman, Onofrio feels free to play his pranks on the poor people without any fear of the consequences. On one occasion, when he is arrested at a dinner with common criminals, he turns to the populace in a vulgar speech, claiming that his nobility allows him to do what he wants, and that they, being poor, are not worth anything. Memorable is the dispute between the poor Jew Aronne Piperno and the Marquis for the payment of a salary. Aaron is amazed when Onofrio refuses to pay with the argument that his creditor being a Jew is a murderer of Jesus. Aaron brings his case to court, but Onofrio wins the lawsuit by corrupting the judges and the cardinals. Piperno is condemned and mocked by the people, and Onofrio announces to the Pope that justice has just died in his States.

In the meantime the Pope has the French Emperor Napoleon Bonaparte excommunicated. When the conflict escalates, Onofrio is appointed commander of the Swiss Guards in Castel Sant'Angelo. He does not take the situation very seriously, and ultimately fails in his task to defend the Papal palace. While he is leaving command to check on the fidelity of a young plebeian lover of his, the French guards enter the Holy See to arrest the Pope. Onofrio has personally few prejudices and quickly includes acquaintances from the new order within his circle, becoming friends with a young commander of the French regiment as well as more senior officers. This is however much to the disappointment of his pious mother who claims that the French, as enemies of the Pope King, are also sworn enemies of God.

With the French occupants a theater company also arrives from Paris, introducing the novelty of real women for female roles. Due to the obtuseness of the Roman people the show proves a failure, but Onofrio takes the chance to start an affair with the beautiful and free spirited singer Olympia. One night, while walking around the ruins of the Forum to find a suitable spot for sleeping together, they notice a drunken coalman who is a perfect sosia of the Marquis. Onofrio decides to play one of his jokes by switching roles. He instructs his servant to have the unconscious man dressed up as himself, while he will play the part of Gasperino the coalman. The next morning the poor drunkard wakes up in Onofrio's bed to find himself transformed into a marquis. His bad manners lead the family to believe that he is possessed by the spirit of a dead coalman, and Onofrio's uncle tries to have him exorcised. After the first shock Gasperino starts to adapt to his new role and some of his family find him even better than the real Marquis. But when the Pope returns after Napoleon's defeat he has Onofrio condemned and Gasperino risks to end his life under the guillotine. The execution is however stopped at the last minute by order of the Pope, as it turns out he wanted to be the one to play a prank on Onofrio for once.

== Cast ==
- Alberto Sordi ... Onofrio Del Grillo / Gasperino the coalman
- Giorgio Gobbi ... Ricciotto, servant
- Paolo Stoppa ... Pope Pius VII
- Caroline Berg ... Olympia, French singer
- Jacques Herlin ... Étienne Radet, French general
- Marc Porel ... Capitaine Blanchard, French commander
- Flavio Bucci ... Don Bastiano, chief of the brigands
- Riccardo Billi ... Aronne Piperno, cabinet maker
- Elena Daskowa Valenzano ... Marchesa del Grillo, mother
- Isabelle Linnartz ... Genuflessa del Grillo, cousin
- Marina Confalone ... Camilla del Grillo, sister
- Cochi Ponzoni ... Conte Rambaldo, brother-in-law
- Andrea Bevilacqua ... Pompeo, nephew
- Pietro Tordi ... Mons. Terenzio del Grillo, uncle
- Leopoldo Trieste ... Don Sabino, chaplain
- Tommaso Bianco ... Administrator
- Angela Campanella ... Faustina, concubine
- Elena Fiore ... Anita, Faustina's mother
- Gianni Di Pinto ... Marcuccio, Faustina's lover
- Elisa Mainardi ... Gasperino's wife
- Isabella De Bernardi ... Gasperino's daughter
- Camillo Milli ... Cardinal Secretary of the Pontifical States
- Giovanni Febbraro ... Pontifical commissioner
- Salvatore Jacono ... Bargello, Pontifical constable
- Paolo Paoloni ... Captain of the Swiss Guards

== Awards ==
The film won two David di Donatello, four Nastri d'Argento in 1982. At the 32nd Berlin International Film Festival Mario Monicelli won the Silver Bear for Best Director.
