= The Sovrans of the Old World =

C’era una vorta un Re cche ddar palazzo / mannò ffora a li popoli st’editto: / Io sò io, e vvoi nun zete un cazzo (eng.: Once there was a king who from his palace Sent out among the people this edict: "I am I, and you're nothing but shit.")

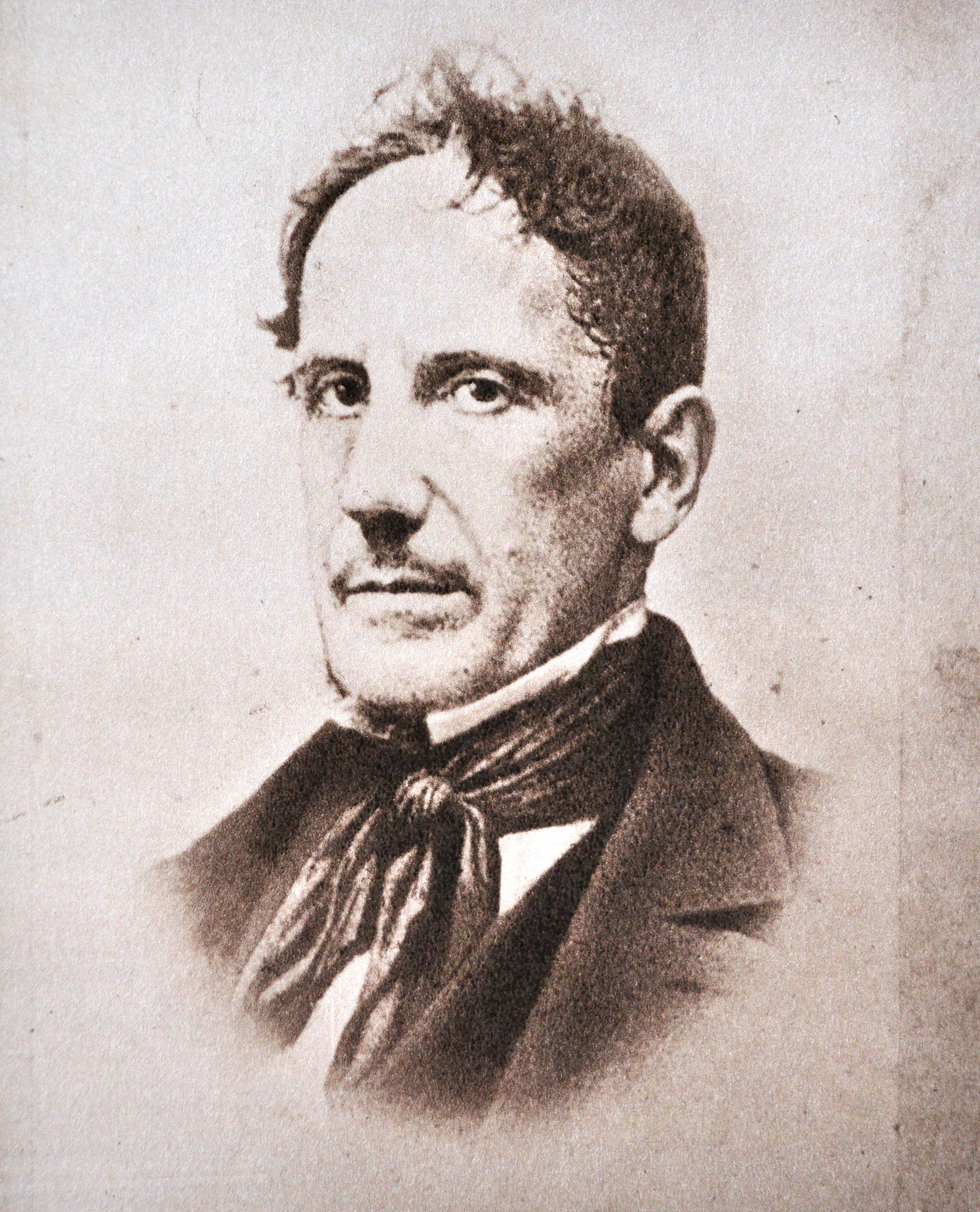
Giuseppe Gioachino Belli

"The Sovrans of the Old World" (Romanesco original title: Li soprani der monno vecchio) is an 1831 sonnet written in the dialect of Rome, by poet Giuseppe Gioachino Belli. It is part of the collection Sonetti romaneschi, sometimes listed as number 361 or 362. The sonnet is primarily a dire realistic evocation of the nature of absolute power exercised by rulers in Italy in his day. However, in analyzing the raw, crude politics of his own time Belli touched upon a much broader section of Italy's history, and upon the losses the nation suffered from foreign invasions and local abuses of power.

The parable quoted above describes the latter phenomenon. A king confiscates all of his vassals' possessions; when the people ask why, the king replies that he can treat them as he likes because only he matters and they do not. The use of dialect allows the poet to strip down the symbolic pretensions of sovereign authority and expose the raw violence, narcissistic pretentiousness and insouciant contempt of rulers for the people over whom they hold sway. The 'plebs' are nothing, putty in the hands of the powerful who can bend them to their will or conversely make the 'bent' under them 'straight', according to whim and circumstance. This overwhelming power is such that, even when his curiosity about its reception is stirred sufficiently to send out an agent, an executor, to sound out how the proletariat really thinks of his arbitrary edicts, word comes back that his view of himself is widely endorsed by the very people he afflicts.

The verse Io sò io, e vvoi nun zete un cazzo (literally "I am who I am, and you are fuck nobodies") was famously appropriated by Mario Monicelli in his 1981 movie Il Marchese del Grillo, in which it is rendered as "io sò io e voi nun siete un cazzo," (though most of the younger population still uses the form sete) and has since then become a frequent quote of contemporary Italian culture.
