= Monument to Giuseppe Gioachino Belli =

Monument to Belli
- Monumento a Giuseppe Belli
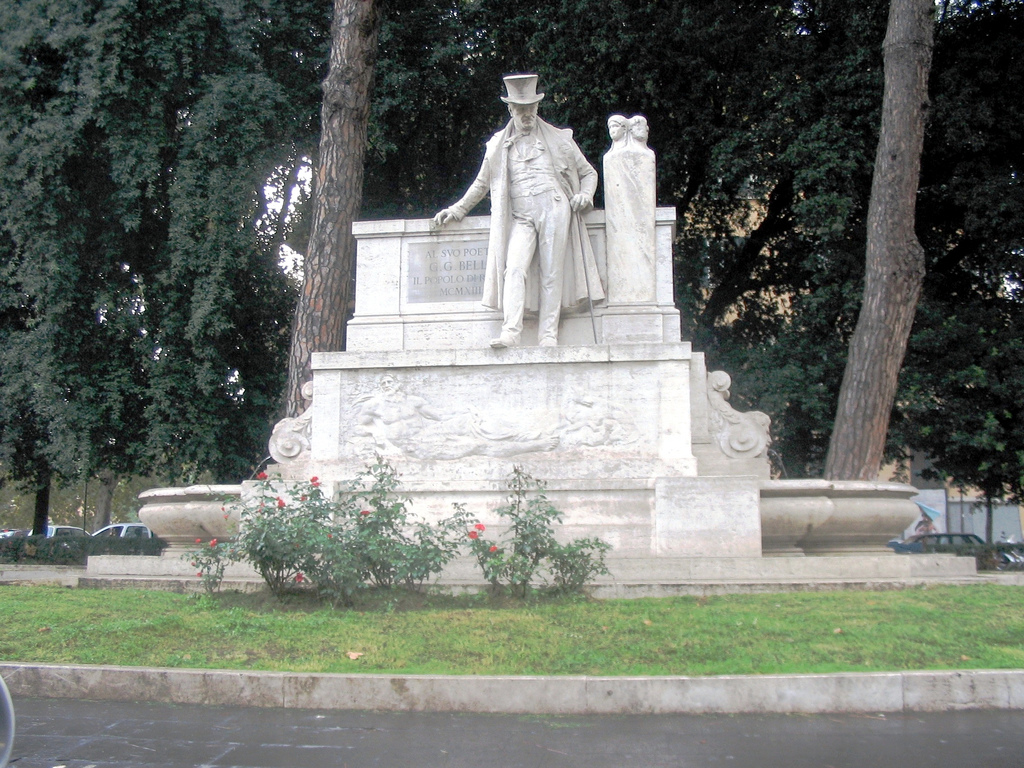
- The location of the monument today Click on the map to see marker.
- Location: Piazza de Giuseppe Belli, Trastevere neighborhood, Rome, Italy
- Coordinates: 41°53′24″N 12°28′28″E
- Designer: Michele Tripisciano
- Material: marble
- Opening date: 4 May 1913

The Monument to Giuseppe Gioachino Belli is a marble memorial dedicated to the 19th-century poet who wrote mainly in Romanesco, the Roman dialect. It is located just off the Lungotevere in Trastavere, just across from the entrance to the Ponte Garibaldi over the Tiber.

== Description ==
The work was funded by public donations, an effort started in 1910 by Domenico Gnoli, Ferdinando Martini and Leone Caetani. A competition selected the design by Michele Tripisciano in 1911, and the monument was inaugurated in May 1913, for the 50th anniversary of the poet's death. The well-dressed poet with a top hat, a walking stick, and his right hand loiters on a reconstruction of Ponte Fabricio banister, recognizable by the presence of a typical four-faced hermes. Awkwardly represented as aloof on a plinth, he affectionately gazes at his fellow pedestrians. Below is a low square plinth, with a relief with symbols of Rome: an allegorical figure of the river Tiber lying, the Capitoline Wolf feeding the twins; and on the rear, Romans gathered around "Pasquino". An inscription bears the dedication To their poet G.G. Belli the People of Rome MCMXIII. The grotesque mask feeding the fountain represent Poetry and Satire, two features of Belli's work. The original monument incorporated a wooden walking stick, but this kept being stolen and has been replaced with an iron rod.
