= Giggi Zanazzo =

Italian poet, dramaturge and anthropologist (1860–1911)

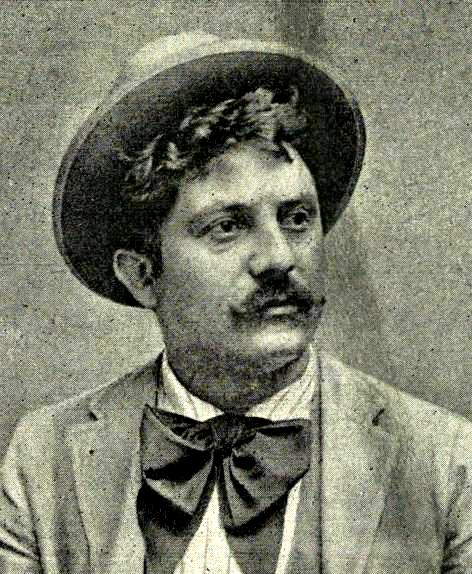
- Born: 31 January 1860; Rome
- Died: 13 December 1911; Rome
- Resting place: Campo Verano
- Occupation: Poet
- Writing career
- Language: Italian language

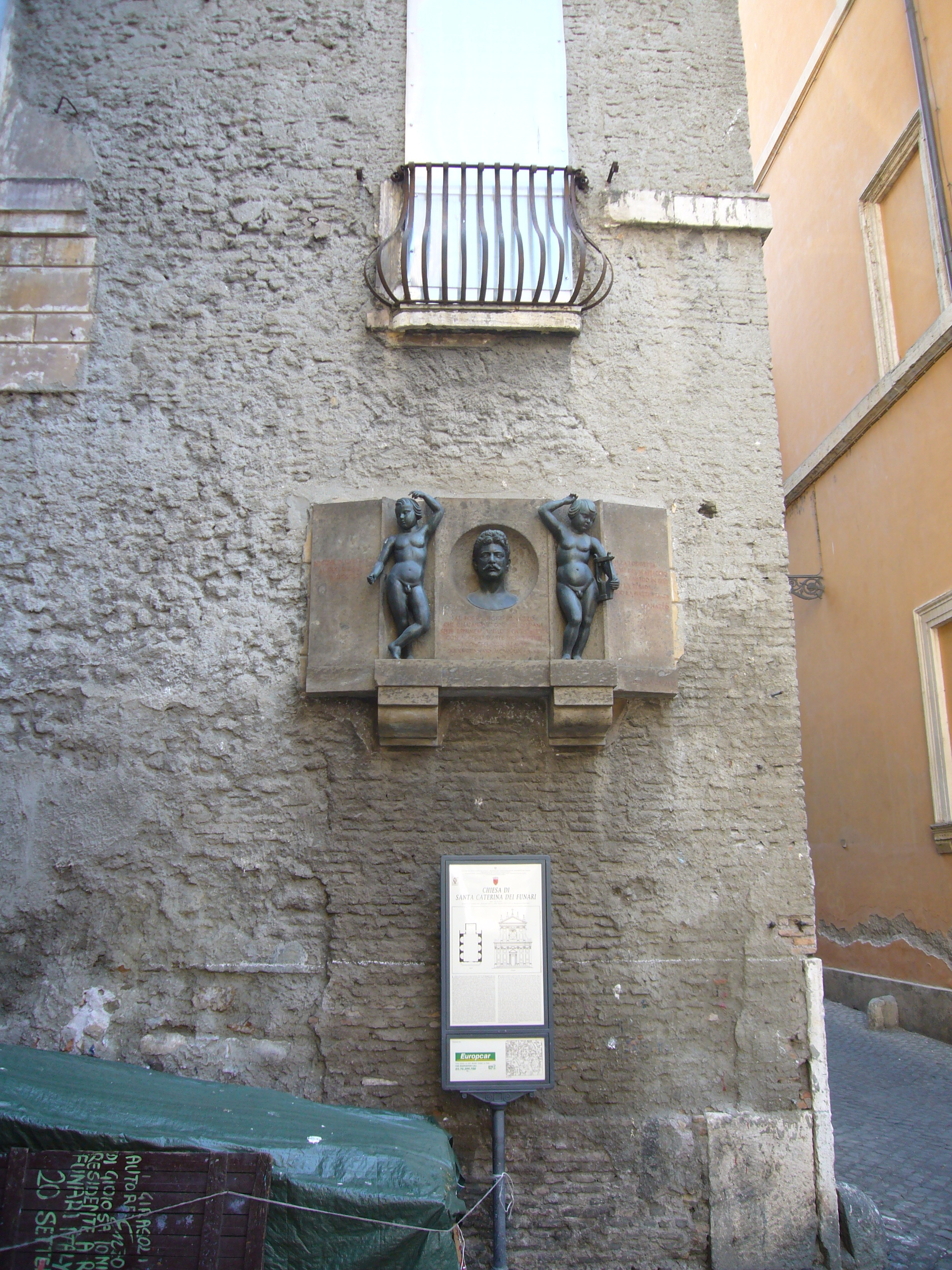
Monument to Zanazzo on the street where he was born

Giggi Zanazzo (31 January, 1860 – 13 December, 1911), born Luigi Antonio Gioacchino Zanazzo, was an Italian poet, playwright, anthropologist, and librarian.

A scholar of the traditions of the Roman people and a poet writing in the Romanesco dialect, he is considered the founding father of Roman dialect studies (romanistica) together with Francesco Sabatini. From his school emerged the early careers of Trilussa and many of the famous names in Roman dialect poetry of early twentieth-century Rome.

Zanazzo signed his works with various pseudonyms: "Adorfo," "Miodine," "Mappa," and especially "Abbate Luviggi".

== Biography ==
He debuted with a collection of Fifty Satirical Sonnets (Rome, 1880).

For the publisher Perino, Zanazzo founded the dialect periodicals Rugantino (1887) and Casandrino (1897), which merged in the same year to create Rugantino e Casandrino, before reverting to the original title.

== Awards and honors ==
There is a street named after him in Italy. There is also bust in his honor in his birthplace, created by Amleto Cataldi.

== Works ==
=== Poetry ===
- Fifty Satirical Sonnets (1880)
- Poesie Romanesche (1904)

=== Essays ===
- Usi, costumi e pregiudizi del popolo di Roma (1908)
