= Cream bun =

Sweet bun with cream filling

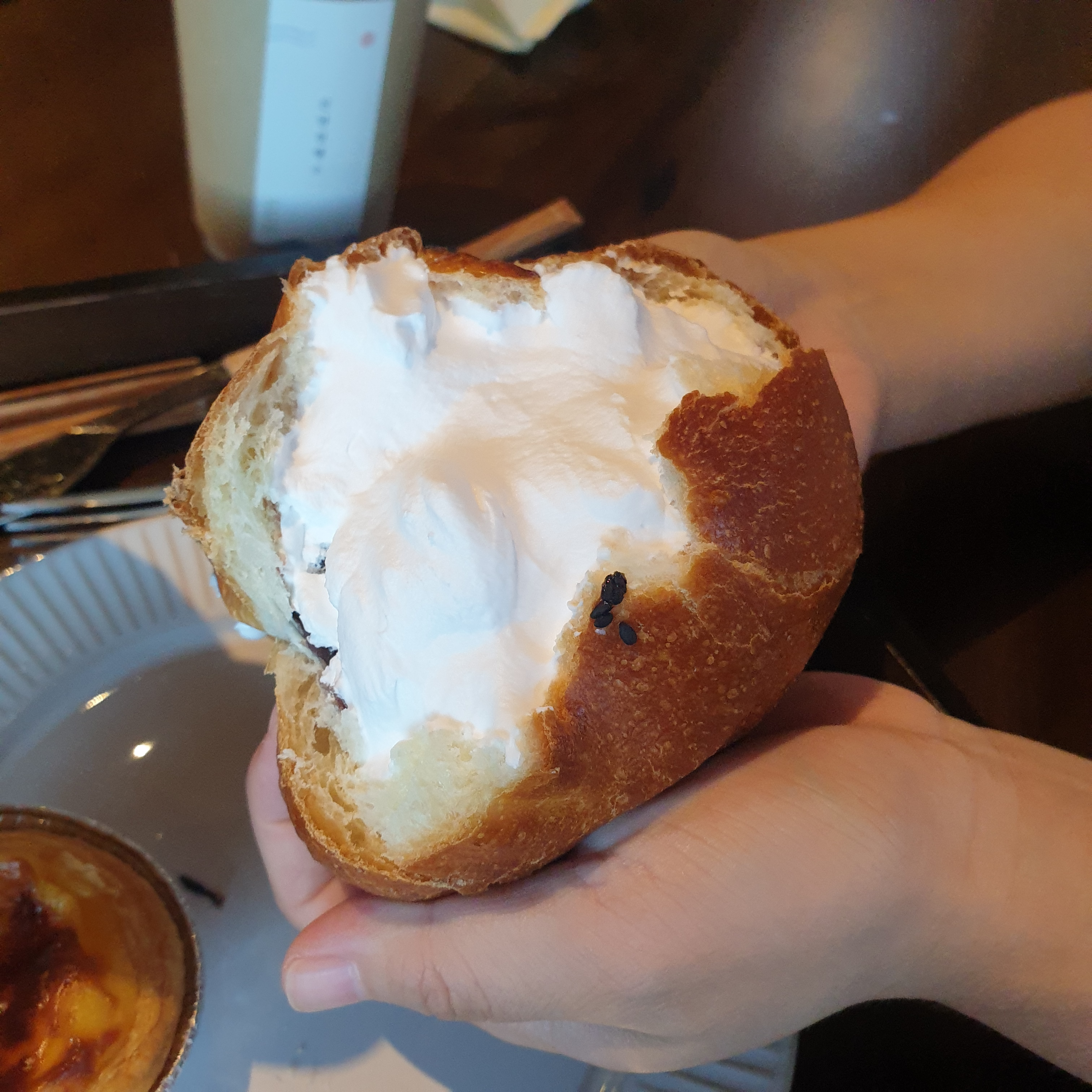
- A cream roll
- Type: Sweet roll, bun

Variations of cream buns or cream rolls exist all around the world. Typically they are made with an enriched dough bread roll that is split after baking and filled with cream, usually whipped cream or pastry cream.

== Variations ==
Among the numerous international variations are the splits of Devon and Cornwall in southwest England, which are yeasted buns filled with clotted cream, the maritozzo of the Lazio region of Italy, which are enriched buns, made with dried fruit and filled with whipped cream, and the roombroodjes of the Netherlands, which are filled with pastry cream.

In Northern Europe, soft buns spiced with cardamom, called semla in Sweden, are eaten on Shrove Tuesday. These are usually filled with an almond paste and whipped cream.

Another specific national version is the Hong Kong cream bun. It is one of the most standard pastries in Hong Kong. It can also be found in most Chinatown bakery shops. The bun has either buttercream or whipped cream filling down the middle with coconut sprinkles on the outside. Variations of it include the "Cream Horn", a pastry in a spiral shape, much like a horn, filled with cream.

In India, cream buns are sold at most bakeries and grocery stores. They have a wide elliptical shape and they are cut in middle along the major axis. Each of the flat bun surfaces on the inside are filled with cream and joined together.

In County Down region of Northern Ireland, a long cream and jam filled variation is known as a "Sailor's Doodle".

In Barreiro, a city in Portugal there is the 'Bola de Manteiga', where very light buns have a butter and cream filling.

== Gallery ==
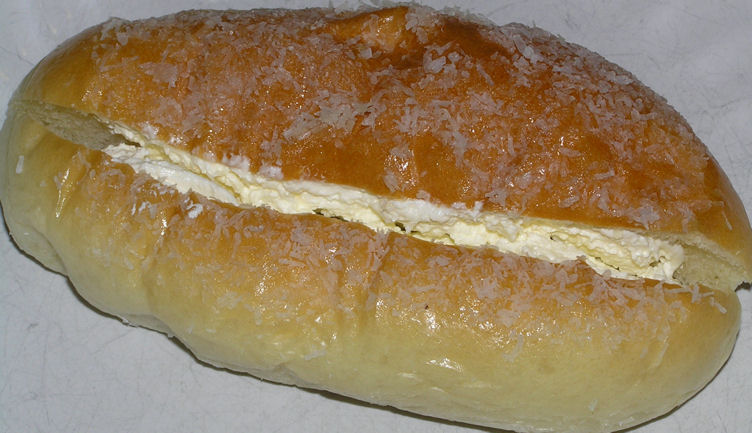
Hong Kong cream bun

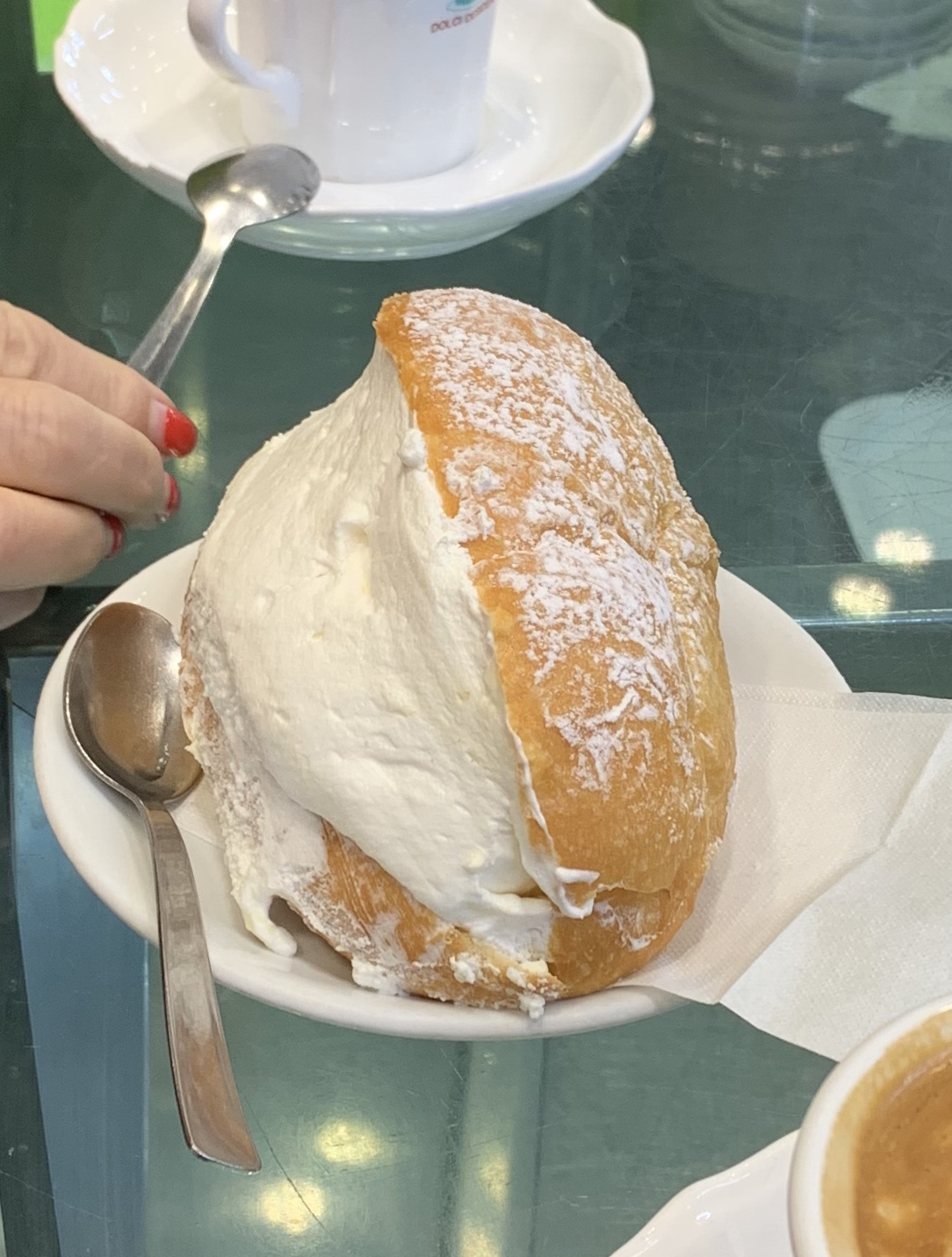
Maritozzo

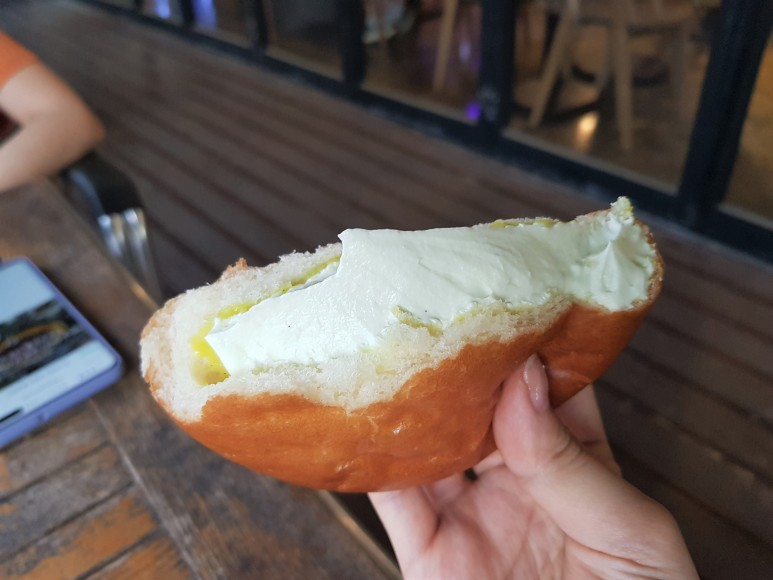
Melon cream roll

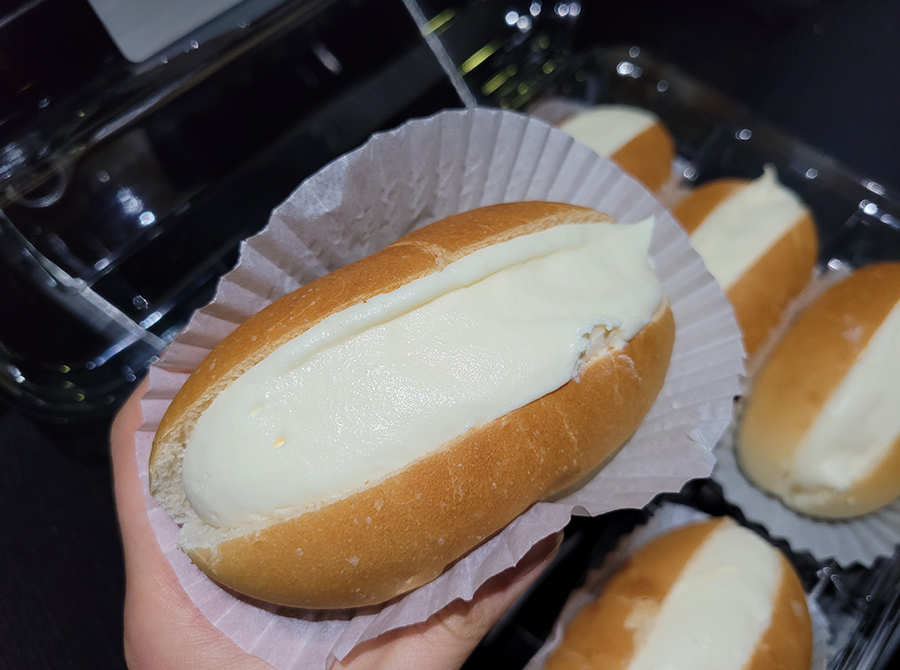
Pastry cream roll

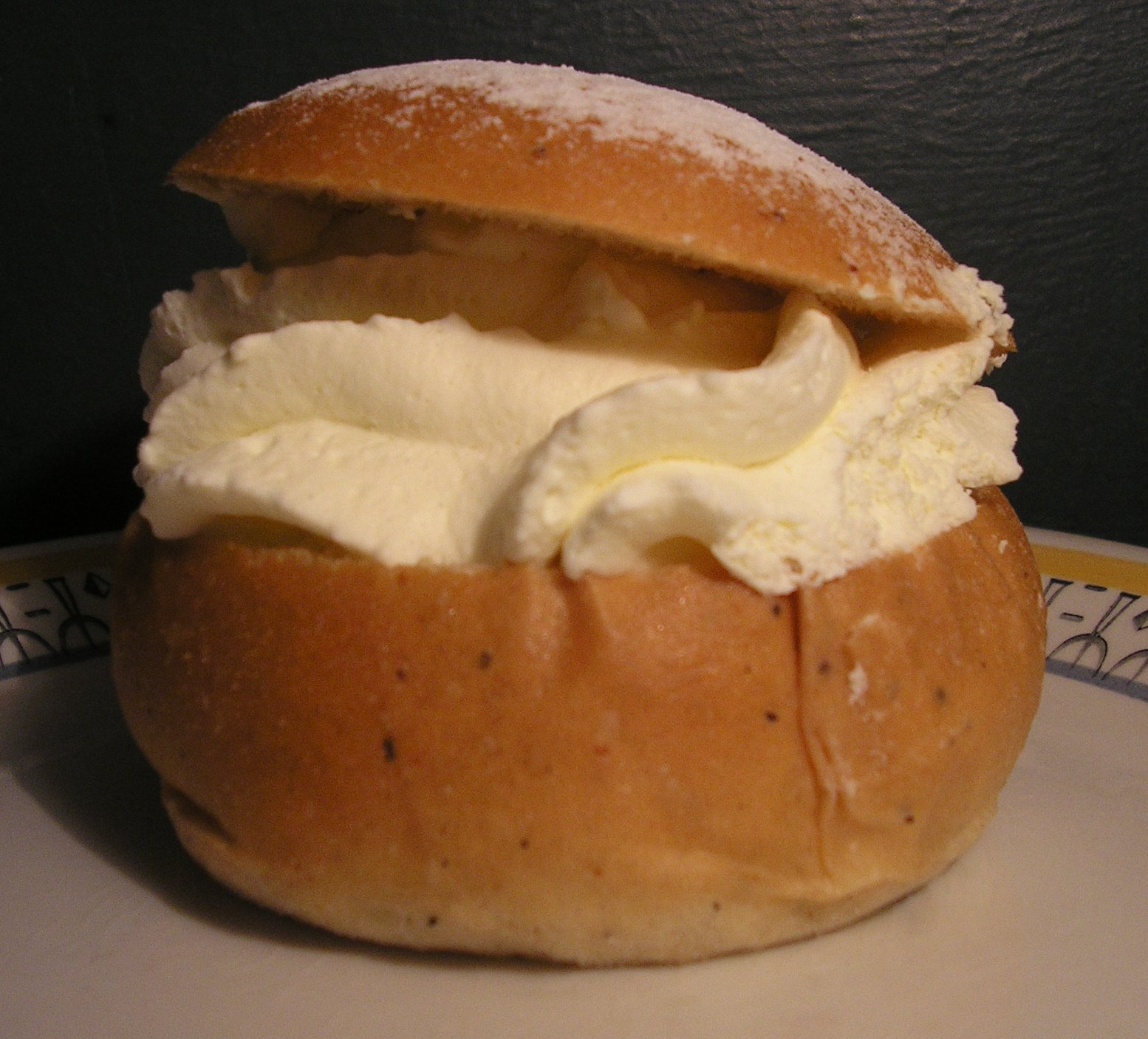
Semla

== See also ==
- List of buns
- List of stuffed dishes
