= Romanesco dialect =

Dialect of Central Italian spoken in Rome

Romanesco
- Romano
- Native to: Italy; Vatican City
- Region: Metropolitan City of Rome Capital, Lazio
- Language family: Indo-European: Italic; Latino-Faliscan; Latin; Romance; Italo-Western; Italo-Dalmatian; Italo-Romance; Central Italian; Romanesco
- Writing system: Latin

Language codes
- ISO 639-3: –
- Glottolog: None
- Linguasphere: 51-AAA-rab
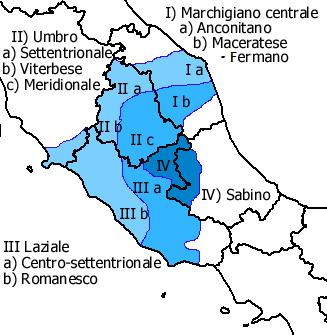

Romanesco (Italian pronunciation: [romaˈnesko]) is one of the Central Italian dialects spoken in the Metropolitan City of Rome Capital, especially in the core city. It is linguistically close to Tuscan and Standard Italian, with some notable differences from these two. Rich in vivid expressions and sayings, Romanesco is used in a typical diglossic setting, mainly for informal/colloquial communication, with code-switching and translanguaging with the standard language.

== History ==
=== First traces ===
The vernacular language of Rome, of which the short Commodilla catacomb inscription (9th century AD) might be considered the earliest attestation, is believed to have been regarded as low-prestige, as can be seen in the 11th-century Saint Clement and Sisinnius inscription, featuring a dialogue wherein the saint, who speaks a slightly solecistic and misspelled form of Medieval Latin, is given higher moral ground by juxtaposing his liturgical language with the common speech employed by Sisinnius and his servants.

=== Old Romanesco ===
The 13th century saw the first works of literature written in Roman vernacular, such as Storie de Troja et de Roma (Stories of Troy and of Rome, an anonymous translation of Multae historiae et Troianae et Romanae, a historical compilation by another anonymous author) and Le miracole de Roma (The marvels of Rome, translation of Mirabilia Urbis Romae), characterized by a coexistence of Latin and vernacular elements.

The status of the dialect as low-class was consolidated in the 1300s, when Dante Alighieri described it in his Latin essay De vulgari eloquentia as the worst one in Italy, a tristiloquium ("offensive speech"), linking it to the uncouthness of the people, criticizing their custom of addressing even people commonly perceived as socially superior by using the informal pronoun tu, instead of formal voi (something that had already been remarked by Salimbene di Adam in his chronicle, written twenty-some years before).

The work that best represents this phase of the dialect is a chronicle—known in Italian as the Cronica dell'Anonimo Romano, and also by the title Vita di Cola di Rienzo (Life of Cola di Rienzo)—written in the latter half of the century by an anonymous Roman author.

During the last decades of the 14th century, Romanesco came to be perceived, even among people of high social status, as having higher prestige than before, and started appearing in votive and burial inscriptions, as well as in notarial documents.

==== Noteworthy features ====
An analysis published in 2022 presents the following as defining characteristics of the first stage of the Roman vernacular, called "first-phase Romanesco" (romanesco di prima fase, the dialect as found in the 14th century).

===== Phonology =====
- Vowel breaking of original stressed ⟨e, o⟩ > /jɛ, wɔ/ e.g.:
  tempus > tiempo ("time")
  mortuus > muorto ("dead")
- Lack of raising of stressed vowels before [ŋ] (e.g. lengua, "tongue")
- Lack of raising of pretonic /e/ (e.g. de Roma; compare Tuscan di Roma)
- Conservation of unstressed /a/ when followed by a trill consonant (e.g. margarita; compare Tuscan margherita)
- Assimilation
  - progressive, e.g.:
    ⟨nd⟩ > /nn/: mundus > munno ("world")
    ⟨mb, nv⟩ > /mm/: combattere > commattere ("to fight"); convertit > (se) commerte ("he/she/it changes")
    ⟨ld⟩ > /ll/: cal(i)dus > callo ("hot")
  - regressive, e.g.:
    ⟨x⟩ /ks/ > /ss/: coxa > cossa ("thigh")
    ⟨-gn-⟩ /ŋn/ > /n/: lignāmen > falename ("carpenter")
- Betacism
  - ⟨b, v⟩ > /(b)b/ when geminated or preceded by a consonant other than /r/:
    abbelenare ("to poison") (compare Tuscan avvelenare)
  - ⟨b, v⟩ > /v/ when word-initial, postvocalic, or preceded by /r/:
    balneum > vagno ("bathroom")
    parabola > paravola ("word")
    barba > varva ("beard")
- Palatalization
  ⟨-ssj-⟩ > /ʃʃ/, e.g.: russeus, russjus > roscio ("red")
  ⟨-pj-⟩ > /tt͡ʃ/, e.g.: appia > Accia ("Appian")
  ⟨g(e)-⟩ > /j/, e.g.: gelū > ielo ("frost")
  ⟨-cchj-⟩ > /tt͡s/, e.g.: bracchjum > vrazzo ("arm")
  ⟨dj-, gj-, bj-/vj-⟩ > /j/:
  iornata ("day") (compare Tuscan giornata)
  iugnio ("June") (compare Tuscan giugno)
  raja ("anger, rage") (compare Tuscan rabbia)
- Labiodentalization ⟨go-, gu-⟩ > /v/, e.g.:
  guerra > verra ("war")
  gonella > vonnella ("skirt")
- ⟨-mj-, -ng(e/i)-, -mbj-⟩ > /ɲɲ/
  sīmje > scignie ("monkeys")
  adjungere > aiognere ("to add")
  cambjum > cagno ("change")
- Affrication of /s/ to /t͡s/ after /l, r, n/
  tuolzero ("[they] took") (compare Tuscan tolsero)
  apparzo ("appeared", past participle)(compare Tuscan apparso)
  menza ("table") (compare Tuscan mensa)
- ⟨-rj-, -sj-⟩ > /r, s/, e.g.:
  parjus > paro ("even, equal")
  camisja > camisa ("shirt")
- Paragogic syllable -ne appended to oxytones (words stressed on the last syllable), e.g.:
  è ("[he/she/it] is") > ene
- Lack of voicing of voiceless plosives in intervocalic position, and between a vowel and a resonant:
  lacus > laco ("lake") (compare Tuscan lago)
  patrem > patre ("father") (compare Tuscan padre)

===== Morphology =====
- Presence of nouns with plural endings -a, -ora (e.g. cervella, "brains"; tempora, "times")
- Presence of nouns with plural ending -o, reflecting the Latin 4th-declension ending (e.g. mano, "hands"; compare Latin manūs)
- Presence of nouns with singular ending -e, reflecting the Latin 5th-declension ending (e.g. bellezze, "beauty"; implies Vulgar Latin *bellitjem)
- lo as the masculine definite article (plural gli)
- 2nd- and 3rd-person singular possessive pronouns — tio ("your(s)"), sio ("his/her/its") — analogically reshaped on the basis of mio ("my, mine"); compare Tuscan mio, tuo, suo
- Presence of enclitic personal possessive pronouns (e.g. patremo, "my father")
- Accusative singular personal pronouns mi, ti, si (compare Tuscan me, te, sé)
- Presence of the numeral doi ("two") (compare Tuscan due)
- Use of the personal pronouns esso, essa and essi to refer to animated referents.
- Notable forms in the conjugation of the verb essere:
  Indicative present:
  so, sì, è, simo, site, sonno/soco
  Indicative future:
  serraco (3rd-person plural)
- Notable forms in the conjugation of the verb avere:
  Indicative present:
  aio (1st-person singular)
  ao (3rd-person singular, with analogical extension of -ao and -eo to the 3rd-person singular forms of other verbs)
  aco (3rd-person plural)
  Indicative future:
  averao (3rd-person singular, with analogical extension to farrao, from the verb fare)
  Past historic:
  abbi (1st-person singular)
  abbe (3rd-person singular)
  abbero (3rd-person plural)
  Conditional:
  abbera (1st- and 3rd-person singular, from Latin pluperfect forms habueram/habuerat)
- Notable forms in the conjugation of the verb potere: pozzo (1st-person singular present indicative)
- Loss of final -no in the 3rd-person plural form of the indicative present:
  dico ("they say") (compare Tuscan dicono)
  - 3rd-person plural present indicative forms such as daco ("they give") or soco ("they are"), as well as 3rd-person plural future indicative forms such as sarraco ("they will be") and farraco ("they will do/make"), are instead the result of analogical levelling on the basis of faco ("they do/make" < Vulgar Latin *facunt)
- 1st-person plural indicative present endings such as -amo, -emo, -imo
- 1st-conjugation 3rd-person singular preterite ending -ao (and, by analogy, -eo in the 2nd conjugation), with the allomorph -à
- 1st- and 2nd-person plural imperative forms based on the Latin hortatory subjunctive, e.g. prennamo, iate
- Addition of -vo in some 2nd-person plural verb forms, e.g. mettestivo

=== Tuscan influences ===
The 15th century marked the beginning of a process of Tuscanization eventually resulting, about a century later, in what some scholars have called the "de-southernization" (smeridionalizzazione) of the Roman vernacular, which was exposed particularly early to the Florentine dialect that would later become a prestige linguistic variety in various Italian states (even being identified as Italian rather than Tuscan), giving birth to what has been called "second-phase Romanesco" (romanesco di seconda fase).

Among the causes of this Tuscanization, some factors internal to the vernacular have been identified, like its relative isolation from even its closest relatives, its being halfway—both geographically and linguistically—between the Tuscan and Southern dialects, and the abnormal presence of the Latin superstratum, which, being an official language with elevated status, had undermined its prestige from the very beginning.

In 1932, linguist Bruno Migliorini described the decline of Old Romanesco as a result of demographic increase in the population of Tuscan origin, with their more-prestigious linguistic variety displacing Roman vernacular in the written language, and relegating it to the lowest levels of spoken language, as exemplified in the following table:

	14th century	16th century
written language	Latin, literary Romanesco	Latin, literary Tuscan
spoken language	Roman vernacular	spoken Tuscan, Roman vernacular

Migliorini's view has been challenged by Mancini, who defined it as "simplistic", and failing to account for sociolinguistic elements, as Roman vernacular was an "instrument of linguistic identification" for Rome's middle class, whose loss of political and economical power after the return of Pope Gregory XI to Rome in 1377, following the end of the Avignon Papacy, meant the decline of their linguistic variety in favor of Tuscan, which became the highest linguistic benchmark.

Mancini rather saw the linguistic situation of 14th-century Rome as divided in three layers:

- an official language, strictly adhering to the rules of Tuscan, with many Latin influences, and very few local traits;
- a "medial" language, used by the wealthy classes, with Florentine influences;
- a popular language, with Old Romanesco characteristics, that soon became the object of the stigmatization which would later lead to its disappearance.

Linguist Pietro Trifone posited that, while the process of Tuscanization was well underway in regard to written language in the 15th century, the same process for spoken language should be pushed forward to the 16th, after the 1527 sack of Rome led to a drastic decrease in the numbers of the indigenous Roman populace, rendering second-phase Romanesco "an unusable tool for the whole community of speakers". He later also claimed that the heavy, influential presence of Tuscans in Rome would not have been enough to cause the decline of the spoken vernacular, as it wasn't in Naples, despite there having been strong Tuscan influences as well.

==== Innovations ====
Marazza reports the following changes:

===== Phonology =====
- Gradual elimination of metaphonic diphthongs /jɛ, wɔ/
- Vowel breaking of stressed /ɛ/ in open syllables into /jɛ/, as in Tuscan (sometimes even erroneously, through hypercorrection)
- Raising of stressed /e/ before [ŋ], e.g. lingua ("tongue", displacing earlier lengua)
- Monophthongization of diphthong /wɔ/ into /ɔ/, e.g. bono ("good"; compare earlier buono)
- Alternation of the metaphonetic diphthong /wɔ/ with /wɛ/, e.g. cuerpo/cuorpo ("body")
- Voicing of intervocalic voiceless plosives according to Tuscan pronunciation, e.g. padre ("father"; compare earlier patre)
- Distinction between /b/ and /v/ according to Tuscan pronunciation, but with gemination of postvocalic /b/, e.g. la bbarba ("the beard")
- Palatalization
  ⟨gn⟩ → /ɲɲ/, e.g. falegname ("carpenter"; compare earlier falename)
  /ks/ → /ʃʃ/, e.g. lascià ("to leave; to let")
  /sj/ → /ʃ/ or /dd͡ʒ/, e.g. camicia ("shirt"), priggione ("prison; prisoner")
  /kj/ → /tt͡ʃ/, e.g. occio ("eye"; compare earlier uocchio)
- Substitution of palatalized ⟨-pj-⟩ /tt͡ʃ/ → /ppj/, e.g.: earlier Accia → Appia ("Appian")
- Substitution of unstressed /ar/ with /er/, e.g. comperare ("to buy")
- Apocope of infinitive verb forms, e.g. annà ("to go"; compare earlier annare)

===== Morphology =====
- Plural forms of possessives ending in -a, e.g. mia, tua, sua
- the adverb puro ("also")
- Notable forms in the conjugation of the verb essere:
  Indicative present:
  semo (1st plural), sete (2nd plural), so' (3rd plural)
- Notable forms in the conjugation of the verb avere:
  Indicative present:
  avemo (1st plural), ate (2nd plural)
  Imperfective indicative:
  avo (1st singular)
- 3rd-person plural present indicative ending in -eno, e.g. moveno ("they move")

=== Early Modern period ===
In the first half of the 16th century, with the rule of popes Leo X and Clement VII, both part of the Florentine House of Medici, the Tuscanization process reached its peak, as seen through the introduction of vernacular language in papal documents in the first decades of the century. The ruling class and the cultural elites of Rome were cosmopolitan, often with no actual ties to the social tissue of the city. While this meant that Tuscanizing linguistic influences were mainly confined to the courtly language, the urban upper classes' criticisms of the local dialect grew stronger, leading them to regularly avoid it in higher registers.

In the papal court, a "Roman courtly language" developed from the speech of the intellectuals coming from all over Italy, seeking to create a common vernacular language that could also be considered prestigious through Latin and Tuscan influences. This language became a prestigious variety of literary Italian, in competition against 13th-century Florentine, which would eventually overshadow it.

In three sonnets dating back to this period, Old Romanesco is used to make a caricature of the city's lower classes, among which it was still going strong.

The 1527 sack of Rome, with its numerous civilian casualties, and the following influx of immigrants, mostly coming from Tuscany and northern Italy, caused the indigenous Romans to become a minority, leading them to often have to employ the Tuscanized (or rather, de-southernized) version of their dialect, in order to effectively communicate with the large immigrant population, further weakening their ethnolinguistic identity.

=== Modern period ===
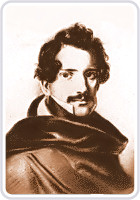
The young Giuseppe Gioachino Belli

The path towards a progressive Tuscanization of the dialect can be observed in the works of the major Romanesco writers and poets of the past two centuries: Giuseppe Gioachino Belli (1791–1863), whose sonetti romaneschi represent the most important work in this dialect and an eternal monument to 19th century Roman people; Cesare Pascarella (1858–1940); Giggi Zanazzo (1860–1911); and Carlo Alberto Salustri (1871–1950), nicknamed Trilussa.

== Diffusion ==
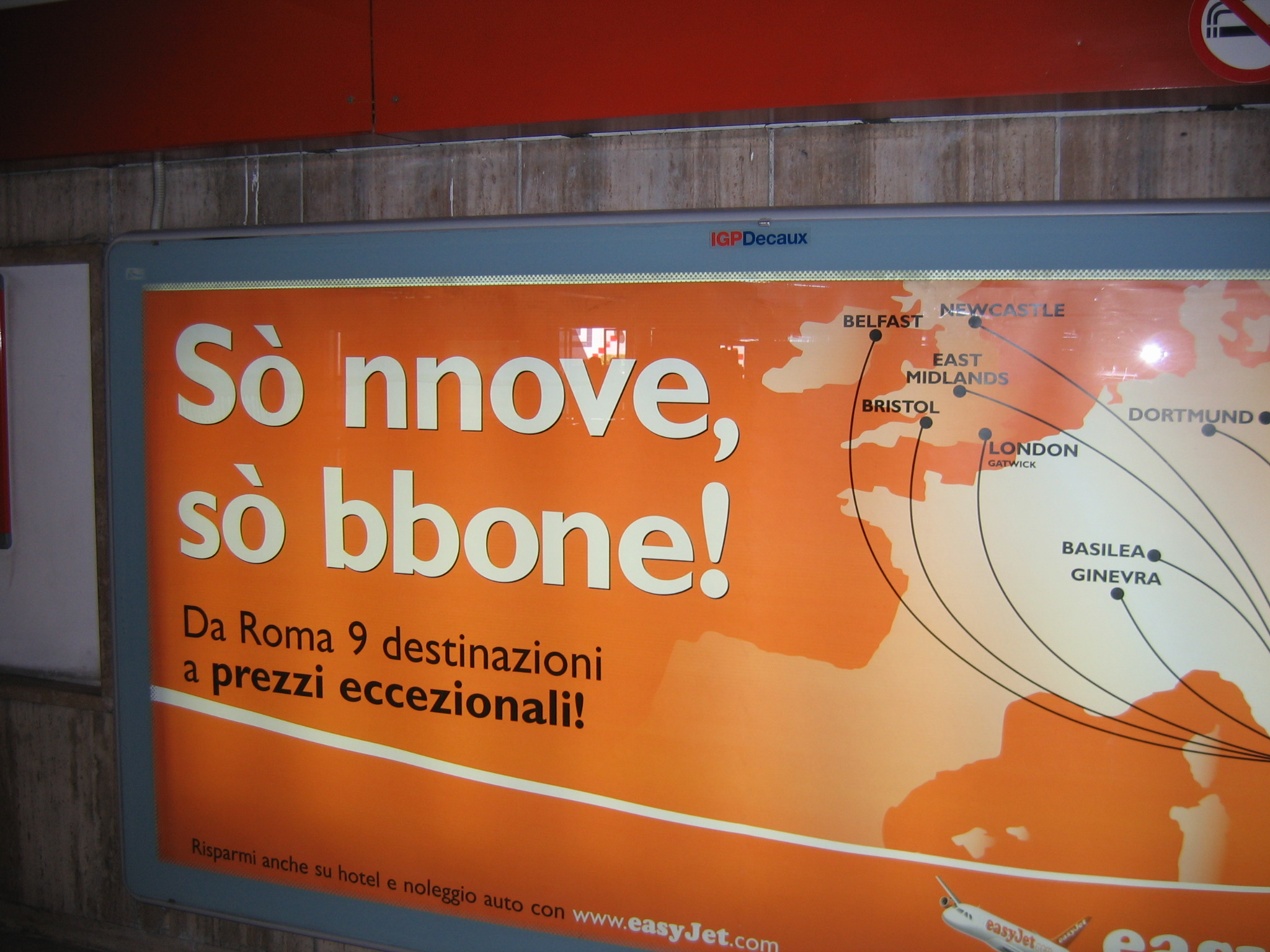
Advertisement for nine European destinations by low-cost air travel in Romanesco at a subway station in Rome. Text: "Sò nnove, / sò bbone!" [There are nine, they are good!]

Before Rome became the capital city of Italy, Romanesco was spoken only inside the walls of the city, while the little towns surrounding Rome had their own dialects. Nowadays, these dialects have been replaced with a variant of Romanesco, which therefore is now spoken in an area larger than the original one. It slightly pervades the everyday language of most of the immigrants who live in the large city.

== Pronunciation ==
Romanesco pronunciation and spelling differs from Standard Italian in these cases:

- /j/ (lengthened) is used where standard Italian uses [ʎ]. This [j] is spelt ⟨j⟩, a letter seldom used in present-day Italian. Compare Italian figlio [ˈfiʎʎo] "son" and Romanesco fijo [ˈfijːo] or fìo [ˈfio] when assimilated;
- geminate /r/ ("rolled r" or alveolar trill) does not exist anymore: for example, azzurro [aˈdːzuːɾo]; (Italian: azzurro "light blue"), verrebbe [veˈɾebːe] (Italian: verrebbe "he/she would come"). A Roman pun recites: "Tera, chitara e guera, co' ddu' ere, sinnò è erore" (English: "Ground, guitar and war with two R's, otherwise there is a mistake"): ere and erore are also "wrong", as they are erre and errore in Standard Italian. This phenomenon presumably developed after 1870, as it was not present in the classical 19th century Romanesco of Belli;
- /l/ becomes /r/ before another consonant: sòrdi [ˈsɔɾdi], Italian soldi "money";
- in Romanesco, as in most Central and Southern Italian languages and dialects, /b/ and /dʒ/ are always geminated where permissible: e.g. libbro [ˈlibːɾo] for Standard Italian libro [ˈliːbro] "book", aggenda for agenda "diary, agenda".
- the dropping of vowels at the beginning of a word when followed by a nasal consonant (m, n, gn), for example 'nzomma (Standard Italian insomma), 'n (Standard Italian un/in), 'mparà (Standard Italian imparare), gni (Standard Italian ogni).
- assimilation with different consonant groups. (typically a Central-Southern phenomenon) For example, /nd/ turns into /nn/ (Standard Italian quando turns into quanno), /ld/ turns into /ll/ (Standard Italian caldo turns into callo), /mb/ turns into /mm/ (Standard Italian piombo turns into piommo).

== Quote ==
Ma nun c'è lingua come la romana
Pe' dì una cosa co' ttanto divario
Che ppare un magazzino de dogana.

— G. G. Belli, "Le lingue der monno" [Languages of the world]
Translation:

But there is no language like the Roman one
To express a concept with so many variants
So that it seems a customs warehouse.

== Noteworthy figures ==
Today, Romanesco is generally considered more of a regional idiom than a true language. Classical Romanesco, which reached high literature with Giuseppe Gioachino Belli, has disappeared.

External forces such as immigration and the dominance of Italian are playing a role in the dissolution of the 1900s dialect in the city centre, transplanting a new and rawer version of it in the surrounding suburbs and periphery, where it's more widely spoken than elsewhere in the city, far away from the now gentrified, tourist central areas. Below is a comparison table of the main differences between the "Classical" Roman dialect and the one in current use, especially in pronunciation uncommonly written or with difficulty (especially the Lex Porena and general consonants assimilation and vowel assimilation, the latter subsequent to lenition), where much homologation with the codified version of Tuscan can be noted, yet along with fresh-new dialectal features which contribute to the modern sound of the idiom the majority of the Italian population is familiar with thanks to social media and gangsta rap songs:

Differences between Classical Romanesco and Modern Romanesco
Classical Romanesco	Modern Romanesco	English	Emended Florentine
dovevimo /doˈve(v)imo/, dovemio /doˈvemjo/	dovamo /daˈamo/	we had to	dovevamo
anneressivo	annavate, andreste /anˈdress̟e/	ye would go	andreste, andavate
annisconne	inguattà	to hide	nascondere
ce l’avevimo /ˌtʃelaˈve(v)imo/, ce l’avemio /ˌtʃelaˈvemjo/	ce l’avamo /tʃaaˈamo/ (only when unstressed; otherwise it's "ce l'avevamo" usually almost fully pronounced)	we had (it)	ce l’avevamo
ogna	unghia	nail	unghia
nu je la fo /nujˌjelaˈfɔ/	nja faccio /ˌɲaaˈfattʃo/	I can't do it/handle this/resist	non ce la faccio
uscì, escì	scì	to go out	uscire
intrippasse	inquartasse ("intrippasse" now means "to get in a (drug) trip"	to gain weight (of fat)	ingrassare

== Notable artists using Romanesco ==
- Ferruccio Amendola, voice actor
- Mario Brega, actor and comedian
- Enrico Brignano, comedian
- Franco Califano, lyricist, musician,
- Paola Cortellesi, actress
- Christian De Sica, actor and singer
- Carlo Emilio Gadda, author
- Elena Fabrizi, actor and cook
- Aldo Fabrizi, actor and director
- Sabrina Ferilli, actress
- Gabriella Ferri, singer
- Lando Fiorini, actor and singer
- Giuseppe Gioacchino Belli, poet
- Anna Magnani, actress
- Nino Manfredi, actor
- Tomas Milian, actor
- Enrico Montesano, actor and comedian
- Pier Paolo Pasolini, poet, film director, writer, actor and playwright
- Cesare Pascarella, poet, painter
- Ettore Petrolini, actor
- Gigi Proietti, actor, director and comedian
- Enzo Salvi, actor
- Alberto Sordi, actor and director
- Trilussa, poet (Carlo Alberto Salustri's pen name)
- Antonello Venditti, singer
- Carlo Verdone, actor and director
- Zerocalcare, comics author
- The anonymous writers of the Pasquinades posted on the talking statues of Rome use Standard Italian, Romanesco or a mixture of both.

== See also ==
- Belli's The Sovrans of the Old World (1831)

== Bibliography ==
- Ravaro, Fernando (2005). Dizionario romanesco (in Italian). Roma: Newton Compton. ISBN 88-541-1792-7.
- Trifone, Pietro (2008), Storia linguistica di Roma (in Italian), Rome: Carocci
