= Giuseppe Gioachino Belli =

Italian poet (1791–1863)

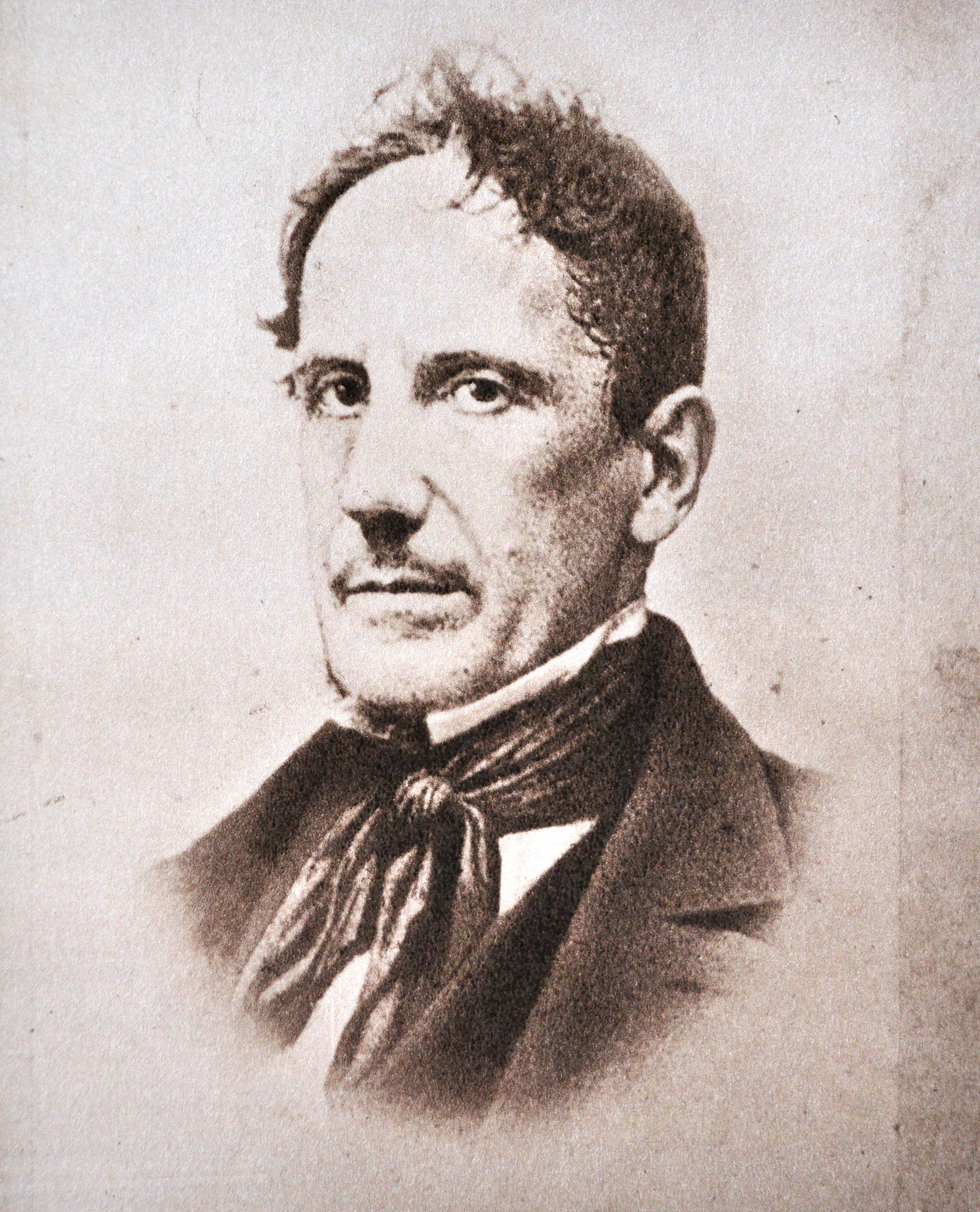
Belli, c. 1845

Giuseppe Francesco Antonio Maria Gioachino Raimondo Belli (7 September 1791 – 21 December 1863) was an Italian poet, famous for his sonnets in Romanesco, the dialect of Rome.

== Biography ==
Giuseppe Francesco Antonio Maria Gioachino Raimondo Belli was born in Rome, Italy, to a family belonging to the lower bourgeoisie.

His father died of typhus, some time after taking up a job in Civitavecchia. Belli, with his mother and his two brothers, moved back to Rome, where they were forced to take cheap lodgings in Via del Corso. Belli began his poetical career initially by composing sonnets in Italian, at the suggestion of his friend, the poet Francesco Spada.

After a period of employment in straitened circumstances, in 1816 he married a woman of means, Maria Conti, and this enabled him the ease to develop his literary talents. The two had a son, Ciro, born in 1824. Belli made some trips to Northern and Central Italy, where he could come in contact with a more evolved literary world, as well with the Enlightenment and revolutionary milieu which was almost totally absent in Rome, where a strong social cohesion had made the almost anarchoid population completely independent from and indifferent to political ideologies. It was during a stay in Milan that he came in touch with the rich local tradition of dialect poetry and satire, as modernized by Carlo Porta, whose witty vernacular sonnets provided him with a model for the poems in Roman dialect that were to make him, posthumously, famous.

His sonnets were often satirical and anti-clerical, as when he defined the Cardinals as 'dog-robbers', for example, or Pope Gregory XVI as someone who kept 'Rome as his personal inn'. Nevertheless, Belli's political ideas remained largely conservative throughout his life. During the democratic rebellion of the Roman Republic of 1849 he defended the rights of the pope.

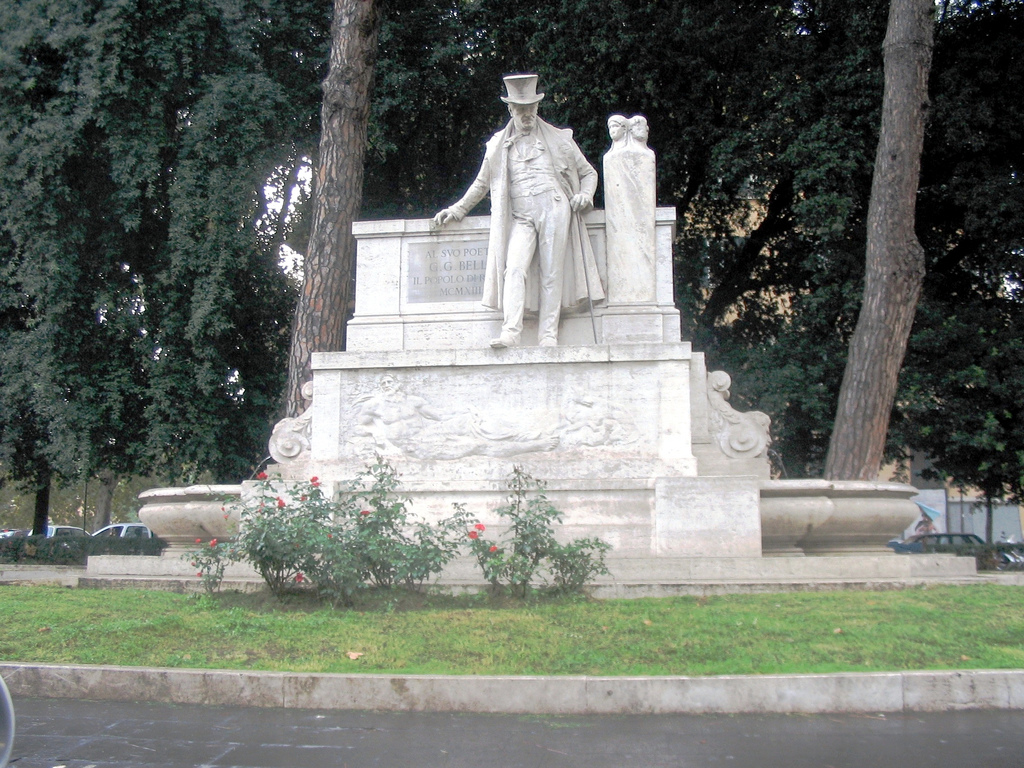
Monument to Belli in the rione of Trastevere, in Rome

After his wife's death in 1837, Belli's economic situation worsened again. In later years Belli lost much of his vitality, and he felt a growing acrimony against the world around him, describing himself as "a dead poet". Consequently, his poetical production dropped off and his last sonnet in dialect dates to 1849.

In his later years Belli worked as artistical and political censor for the papal government. Works whose circulation he denied included those of William Shakespeare, Giuseppe Verdi and Gioachino Rossini.

He died in Rome in 1863 from a stroke. His nephew, painter Guglielmo Janni, wrote a monumental biography in 10 volumes, which was published posthumously in 1967.

== Work ==
I sonetti romaneschi, 1886

Belli is mainly remembered for his vivid popular poetry in the Roman dialect. He produced some 2,279 sonnets that form an invaluable document of the 19th century's papal Rome and the life of its common people. They were mainly composed in the period 1830–1839. Belli kept them largely hidden, apart from his famous recitals before friends such as Charles Augustin Sainte-Beuve and Nikolai Gogol and, just before his death, asked his friend Monsignor Vincenzo Tizzani to burn them. Fortunately, the prelate gave them back to Ciro Belli, who when first publishing a selection of them in 1866, severely edited them in order not to offend the taste of the time.

Belli came to Roman from Italian, as an educated and intelligent user of the language, and his Letters, recently published, represent some of the finest Italian style of the period. He regarded his Roman sonnets in something of the light of an anthropologist, expressing what he saw of the mood, experience and opinions of the Roman lower classes, and his felicity with the Roman language depended on an already acquired felicity with Italian that was very rare in his time.

The most striking characteristics of Belli's sonnets are the overwhelming humour and the sharp, relentless capability of satirization of both common life and the clerical world that oppressed it. Some of the sonnets, moreover, show a decided degree of eroticism. Although replete with denunciations of the corruption of the world of the Roman Church, and of 19th century Rome in general, Belli's poems have been defined as "never impious". His verse is frequently obscene, emphasizing the exuberant vulgarity and acerbic intuitions of the local world whose language he employed, but is always phrased with an acute technical mastery of rhythm within the difficult formal structures of the Petrarchan sonnet, and by a sense of realism which was rarely matched in the poetical production of Europe, until the emergence of raw realism with Émile Zola and James Joyce.

A selection of Belli's sonnets were translated into English by Anthony Burgess, who employed a rough slang tinged with Lancastrian as a stand-in for Belli's Roman dialect. These translations appear in the novel ABBA ABBA, which deals with a fictional encounter between Belli and John Keats, and are excerpted in Revolutionary Sonnets and Other Poems. Belli's works have also been translated by the poet Harold Norse.

Among other English translators of Belli's work are William Carlos Williams, Eleanor Clark and Miller Williams. Robert Garioch has rendered a selection of his sonnets, very appropriately, into Edinburgh demotic.

In Luigi Magni's film In the Name of the Sovereign People (1990), Belli is played by Roberto Herlitzka.

== See also ==
- Belli's The Sovrans of the Old World (1831)
