= Anthony Burgess bibliography =

This is a list of works by the English writer Anthony Burgess.

== Works ==
That so many writers have been prepared to accept a kind of martyrdom is the best tribute that flesh can pay to the living spirit of man as expressed in his literature. One cannot doubt that the martyrdom will continue to be gladly embraced. To some of us, the wresting of beauty out of language is the only thing in the world that matters.

— Anthony Burgess, English Literature (ch. 21 of 1974 edition)

=== Novels ===
- Time for a Tiger (1956) (Volume 1 of the Malayan trilogy, The Long Day Wanes)
- The Enemy in the Blanket (1958) (Volume 2 of the trilogy)
- Beds in the East (1959) (Volume 3 of the trilogy)
- The Right to an Answer (1960)
- The Doctor Is Sick (1960)
- The Worm and the Ring (1960)
- Devil of a State (1961)
- (as Joseph Kell) One Hand Clapping (1961)
- A Clockwork Orange (1962)
- The Wanting Seed (1962)
- Honey for the Bears (1963)
- (as Joseph Kell) Inside Mr. Enderby (1963) (Volume 1 of the Enderby quartet)
- The Eve of St. Venus (1964)
- Nothing Like the Sun: A Story of Shakespeare's Love Life (1964)
- A Vision of Battlements (1965)
- Tremor of Intent: An Eschatological Spy Novel (1966)
- Enderby Outside (1968) (Volume 2 of the Enderby quartet)
- M/F (1971)
- Napoleon Symphony: A Novel in Four Movements (1974)
- The Clockwork Testament, or Enderby's End (1974) (Volume 3 of the Enderby quartet)
- Beard's Roman Women (1976)
- Abba Abba (1977)
- 1985 (1978)
- Man of Nazareth (based on his screenplay for Jesus of Nazareth) (1979)
- Earthly Powers (1980)
- The End of the World News: An Entertainment (1982)
- Enderby's Dark Lady, or No End of Enderby (1984) (Volume 4 of the Enderby quartet)
- The Kingdom of the Wicked (1985)
- The Pianoplayers (1986)
- Any Old Iron (1988)
- Mozart and the Wolf Gang (1991)
- A Dead Man in Deptford (1993)
- Byrne: A Novel (in verse) (1995)

=== Poetry ===
- Moses: A Narrative (1976) (long poem)
- Revolutionary Sonnets and Other Poems, ed. Kevin Jackson (collection) (2002)
- Jonathan Mann, ed. (2020). Collected Poems. Carcanet Press. ISBN 9781800170131.

=== Theatre ===
- Carl Maria von Weber's Oberon Old and New (new libretto) (1985)
- Blooms of Dublin (1986)
- A Clockwork Orange: A Play with Music (1987)

=== Short stories ===
- 'Somebody's Got to Pay the Rent', Partisan Review (Winter 1968 edition)
- 'An American Organ', in Splinters, ed. Alex Hamilton (1968)
- 'I Wish My Wife Was Dead', Transatlantic Review (Winter 1969–1970 edition)
- Will and Testament: A Fragment of Biography (reworking of Kipling's short story 'Proofs of Holy Writ') (1977)
- The Devil's Mode and Other Stories (1989) (collection)

=== For children ===
- A Long Trip to Teatime (1976)
- The Land Where The Ice Cream Grows (1979)

=== Autobiography ===
- Little Wilson and Big God, Being the First Part of the Confessions of Anthony Burgess (1986)
- You've Had Your Time, Being the Second Part of the Confessions of Anthony Burgess (1990)

=== Collections of journalism ===
- Urgent Copy: Literary Studies (1968)
- Homage to Qwert Yuiop: Selected Journalism 1978–1985 (1986), also published as But Do Blondes Prefer Gentlemen?: Homage to Qwert Yuiop and Other Writings
- One Man's Chorus: The Uncollected Writings, ed. Ben Forkner (1998)
- The Ink Trade: Selected Journalism 1961–1993, ed. Will Carr, Carcanet Press (2018), ISBN 978-1-784-10393-4

=== Biographies ===
- Shakespeare (1970)
- Ernest Hemingway and his World (1978), also published as Ernest Hemingway. Reissued in paperback, I.B.Tauris, with an introduction by Patrick Marnham (2015) (ISBN 978-1-784-53118-8)
- Flame into Being: The Life and Work of D. H. Lawrence (1985)

=== Studies of linguistics ===
- Language Made Plain (1964) (ISBN 0-8152-0222-9)
- A Mouthful of Air: Language and Languages, Especially English (1992) (ISBN 0-688-11935-2)

=== Books on music ===
- This Man and Music (1982)
- Mozart and the Wolf Gang or On Mozart: A Paean for Wolfgang, Being a Celestial Colloquy, an Opera Libretto, a Film Script, a Schizophrenic Dialogue, a Bewildered Rumination, a Stendhalian Transcription, and a Heartfelt Homage upon the Bicentenary of the Death of Wolfgang Amadeus Mozart (1991)

=== Joyce studies ===
- Here Comes Everybody: An Introduction to James Joyce for the Ordinary Reader (1965), also published as Re Joyce
- Joysprick: An Introduction to the Language of James Joyce (1973)

=== Works on literature ===
- (as John Burgess Wilson) English Literature: A Survey for Students (1958, revised 1974)
- The Novel To-day (1963)
- The Novel Now: A Student's Guide to Contemporary Fiction (1967)
- Scrissero in Inglese (1979) ("They Wrote in English", Italy only)
- Ninety-Nine Novels: The Best in English since 1939 – A Personal Choice (1984)

=== Other non-fiction ===
- 'What is Pornography?' (essay) in Perspectives on Pornography, ed. Douglas A. Hughes (1970)
- Obscenity and the Arts (1973)
- New York (1976)
- A Christmas Recipe (1977)
- On Going To Bed (1982)
- An Essay on Censorship (essay about Salman Rushdie in heroic couplets) (1989)
- Childhood (Penguin 60s series) (1996)
- Rencontre au Sommet (conversations between Burgess and Isaac Bashevis Singer in book form) (1998)
- Spain: The Best Travel Writing from the New York Times (2001) (section)
- Return Trip Tango and Other Stories from Abroad (anthology of material published in Translation magazine) (2003) (section)

=== Editor ===
- The Coaching Days of England (1966)
- The Age of the Grand Tour (1966) (co-editor with Francis Haskell)
- A Shorter 'Finnegans Wake' (1969)

=== Translations ===
- (with Lynne Wilson) Michel de Saint Pierre's The New Aristocrats (1962)
- (with Lynne Wilson) Jean Pélégri's The Olive Trees of Justice (1962)
- Jean Servin's The Man Who Robbed Poor Boxes (1965)
- Edmond Rostand's Cyrano de Bergerac (first version 1971, second version 1985; new edition 1991) (translations/stage adaptations)
- Sophocles' Oedipus the King (1972) (translation and adaptation)
- Richard Strauss's Cavalier of the Rose (Hugo von Hofmannsthal libretto) (1982).
- Georges Bizet's Carmen, libretto (1986)
- Alexandr Griboyedov's Chatsky, or the Importance of Being Stupid (four-act verse comedy) (1993)

=== Selected musical compositions ===
- Burgess: Music of an English Writer on the Riviera, album of music composed by Burgess and performed by the Aighetta Guitar Quartet, conducted by Avery Gosfield (1996 audio CD)
- 'A Manchester Overture' (1989)
- 'Tommy Reilly's Maggot', duet for harmonica and piano (1940s)
- 'Rome in the Rain', piano and orchestra (1976)
- Kalau Tuan Mudek Ka-Ulu, five Malay pantuns for soprano and native instruments (1955)
- 'Gibraltar', symphonic poem (1944)
- Dr Faustus, one-act opera (1940)
- 'Trois Morceaux Irlandais', guitar quartet (1980s)
- 'Bethlehem Palm Trees' (Lope de Vega) (1972)
- Chaika, for ship's orchestra (1961; composed aboard the Baltika on voyage to Leningrad)
- 'Song of a Northern City', for piano and orchestra (1947)
- 'The Bad-Tempered Electronic Keyboard', 24 preludes and fugues for piano (1985)
- Partita for string orchestra (1951)
- 'Terrible Crystal: Three Hopkins sonnets for baritone, chorus and orchestra' (1952)
- 'Ludus Multitonalis' for recorder consort (1951)
- 'Lines for an Old Man' (i.e. Eliot) (1939)
- Concertino for piano and percussion (1951)
- Symphonies: 1937; 1956 (Sinfoni Melayu); 1975 (No. 3 in C)
- Sinfoni Malaya for orchestra and brass band, including cries of "Merdeka!" from the audience (1957)
- Mr W.S., ballet suite for orchestra (1979)
- 'Cabbage Face', song for vaudeville skit (1937)
- Sinfonietta for jazz combo
- Pando, march for a P&O orchestra (1958)
- 'Everyone suddenly burst out singing' (Sassoon) for voices and piano (1942)
- Concertos for piano and flute
- 'The Ascent of F6' (Isherwood), music for dance orchestra (1948)
- 'Ode: Celebration for a Malay College', for boys' voices and piano (1954)
- 'Cantata for a Malay College' (1954)
- Passacaglia for orchestra (1961)
- 'Song of the South Downs' (1959)
- 'Mr Burgess's Almanack', winds & percussion (1987)
- The Eyes of New York music score for movie project (1975)
- 'Ich weiss es ist aus', group of cabaret songs (1939)
- Music for Will! (1968)
- Sonatas for piano (1946, 1951) and cello (1944)
- Trotsky in New York, opera (1980)
- Three guitar quartets, No. 1 in homage to Ravel (1986–1989)
- The Brides of Enderby, song cycle (1977)
- 'Music for Hiroshima', for double string orchestra (1945)
- Suite for orchestra of Malays, Chinese and Indians (1956)

=== Prefaces, etc. ===
- Introduction to Henry Howarth Bashford's Augustus Carp, Esquire, By Himself: Being the Autobiography of a Really Good Man (Heinemann 1966)
- Introduction to Wilkie Collins's The Moonstone (Pan Books 1967)
- Introduction to Daniel Defoe's A Journal of the Plague Year (Penguin 1967)
- Introduction to Hubert Selby Jr's Last Exit to Brooklyn (Calder and Boyars 1968)
- Introduction to Mervyn Peake's Titus Groan (Penguin 1968)
- Introduction to G. K. Chesterton's Autobiography (Hutchinson 1969)
- Introduction to G. V. Desani's All About H. Hatterr (Farrar, Straus and Giroux 1970)
- Introduction to John Collier's The John Collier Reader (Knopf 1972)
- Introduction to D. H. Lawrence and Italy (D. H. Lawrence's Twilight in Italy, Sea and Sardinia and Etruscan Places) (Viking Press 1972)
- Foreword to Douglas Jerrold's Mrs Caudle's Curtain Lectures (Harvill 1974)
- Introduction to Arthur Conan Doyle's The White Company (Murray 1975)
- Introduction to Maugham's Malaysian Stories (Heinemann 1978)
- Introduction to The Best Short Stories of J. G. Ballard (Henry Holt & Co 1978)
- Contributor to David Jacob's Book of Celebrities' Jokes & Anecdotes (Robson Books 1980)
- Introduction to Daniel Angeli and Jean-Paul Dousset's Private Pictures (Jonathan Cape 1980)
- Preface to Modern Irish Short Stories, edited by Ben Forkner (Viking Press 1980)
- Introduction to Rex Warner's The Aerodrome (Oxford University Press 1982)
- Afterword to The Heritage of British Literature (Thames and Hudson 1983)
- Foreword to Assessing the 1984 'Ulysses', No.1 in the Princess Grace Irish Library series of books (Rowman & Littlefield 1986)
- Introduction to Richard Aldington's The Colonel's Daughter (Hogarth Press 1986)
- Foreword to Alison Armstrong's The Joyce of Cooking (Station Hill Press 1986)
- Introduction to H.E. Bates's A Month by the Lake & Other Stories (New Directions, 1987)
- Introduction to Venice: An Illustrated Anthology, compiled by Michael Marquesee (Conran Octopus, 1988)
- Preface to Ian Fleming's Casino Royale (Coronet Books, 1988)
- Preface to Ian Fleming's Dr. No (Coronet Books 1988)
- Preface to Ian Fleming's Live and Let Die (Coronet Books, 1988)
- Preface to Ian Fleming's You Only Live Twice (Coronet Books, 1988)
- Preface to David W. Barber's Bach, Beethoven and the Boys: Music History as It Ought to Be Taught (Sound And Vision Publishing 1988)
- Introduction to James Hanley's Boy (Andre Deutsch, 1990)
- Introduction to Oscar Wilde's The Picture of Dorian Gray (Penguin Authentic Texts, 1991)
- Introduction to F. Scott Fitzgerald's The Great Gatsby (Penguin Authentic Texts, 1991)
- Introduction to James Joyce's A Portrait of the Artist as a Young Man (Vintage, 1992)
- Introduction to James Joyce's Ulysses (Vintage 1992)
- Introduction to James Joyce's Finnegans Wake (Vintage 1992)
- Preface to The Book of Tea (Flammarion 1992)
- Introduction to Bob Cato and Greg Vitiello's Joyce Images (W.W. Norton, 1994)
- Introduction to Candy Is Dandy: The Best of Ogden Nash (Carlton Books, 1994)
- Foreword to collector's edition of James Joyce's Dubliners (Secker & Warburg 1994)
- Foreword to collector's edition of James Joyce's A Portrait of the Artist as a Young Man (Secker & Warburg, 1994)
- Foreword to collector's edition of James Joyce's Ulysses (Secker & Warburg, 1994)
- Afterword to Erica Jong's How to Save Your Own Life (Plume 1995)
- Preface to Gore Vidal's Creation (Vintage USA 2002 edition of 1981 novel)
