= Tangier in popular culture =

Tangier has been the subject of many artistic works, including novels, films and music.

== Literature ==
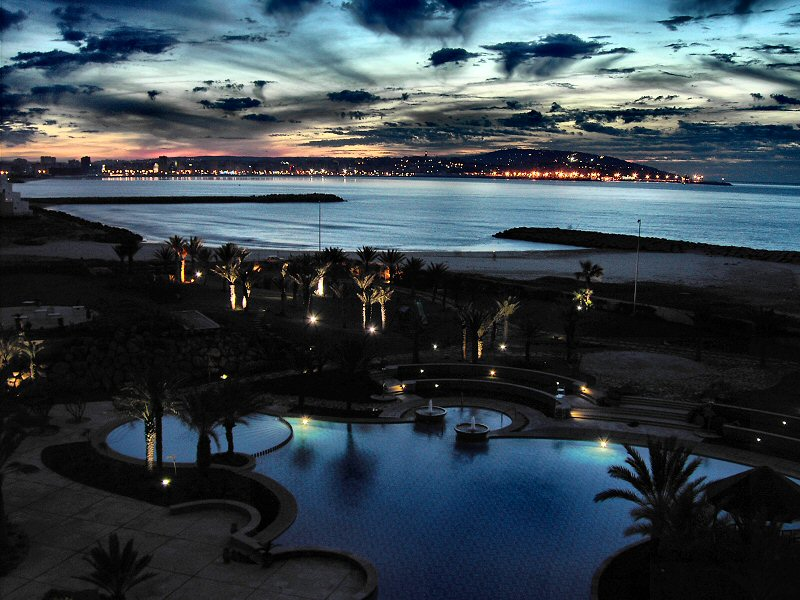
A view of Bay of Tangier at sunset as seen from the Malabata suburb.

- The Innocents Abroad (1869) by Mark Twain includes a mixed bag of comments on his visit to Tangier, ending with: "I would seriously recommend to the Government of the United States that when a man commits a crime so heinous that the law provides no adequate punishment for it, they make him Consul-General to Tangier."
- Carpenter's World Travels: From Tangier to Tripoli (1927), a Frank G. Carpenter travel guide
- The Thief's Journal (1949) by Jean Genet – Includes the protagonist's experiments in negative morality in Tangier
- Let It Come Down (1952), Paul Bowles's second novel
- Au grand socco (1952) by Joseph Kessel – A Moroccan Tangerine boy shares his adventures in the Grand Socco.
- The Strange Land (1954) by Hammond Innes. Adventure/thriller novel set at first in Tangier, and then mainly in the south of Morocco.
- Two Tickets for Tangier (1955) by F. Van Wyck Mason, a pulp spy novel
- The Crossroads of the Mediterranean (1956) by Hendrik de Leeuw chronicles the author's journey through Morocco and Tunisia in the early 1950s and includes many pages describing Tangier, notably the Petit Socco as a food market with mountain dwellers (the jebli) selling their produce and 'the street of male harlots', where they ply 'their shameful trade'.
- The poem "America" (1956) by Allen Ginsberg
- Naked Lunch (1959) by William S. Burroughs – relates some of the author's experiences in Tangier.
- Modesty Blaise (1963), a comic strip and series of books created by Peter O'Donnell. The title character is a woman who takes control of a criminal gang in Tangier and expands it to international status as "The Network". After dissolving The Network and moving to England, she maintains a house on a hillside above Tangier where many scenes in the books and comic strips take place.
- Desolation Angels (1965) by Jack Kerouac relates him living with William Burroughs and other Beat writers in Tangier.
- The Wrong People (1967) by British author Robin Maugham. The novel follows Arnold Turner, a repressed English schoolmaster on holiday in Tangier, who gives in to his long-suppressed homosexual desires and subsequently becomes embroiled in a dangerous sex trafficking scheme devised by a wealthy and manipulative American expatriate, Ewing Baird.
- Enderby Outside (1968) and The Clockwork Testament, or Enderby's End (1974) by Anthony Burgess – Partially takes place in Tangier, where the main character is given a bar by his enemy, Rawcliffe.
- The Drifters (1971) by James A Michener – a novel which follows six young characters from diverse backgrounds and various countries as their paths meet and they travel together through parts of Spain, Portugal, Morocco and Mozambique.
- Tangier (1978) by William Bayer – a novel of expatriate life set in Tangier in the 1970s, featuring a Moroccan detective who watches the foreign colony and a host of writers, painters and socialites believed to have been based on real Tangier personalities.
- The Alchemist (1988) by Paulo Coelho
- Interzone (1989) by Burroughs – It talks about a fictionalized version of Tangier as an international city called Interzone (aka International Zone)
- Jour de silence à Tanger (1990) by Tahar Ben Jelloun
- The Gold Bug Variations (1991) by Richard Powers
- Tanger (1992), Norwegian book by the author Thure Erik Lund. Jostein Bøhn, one of the main characters has it as a final destination point in his journey.
- Streetwise (1992) by Mohamed Choukri
- Seed (2002) by Mustafa Mutabaruka – An African-American dancer struggling with the death of his father meets an enigmatic young woman and her companion in Tangier.
- Dark Voyage (2004) by Alan Furst - World War II naval intrigue, partly set in Tangier.
- Le dernier ami (2004) by Tahar Ben Jelloun. The two protagonists were born in Tangier and the city is revisited many times in the book.
- A Dead Man in Tangier (2007) by Michael Pearce – Sandor Seymour, an officer of Scotland Yard's Special Branch, is sent to investigate a murdered diplomat in Tangier, during the era immediately preceding World War I.

== Periodicals ==
- Es-Saada (Note: also romanized as Essaada, Al-saʿāda, Al-saʿādah, Al-saʿādaẗ, etc.) (السعادة Happiness; November 7, 1904 - December 27, 1956) was an Arabic weekly newspaper published in Morocco that served as the mouthpiece of the French government.
- La Dépêche marocaine was a daily francophone Moroccan newspaper published in Tangier. it is considered the oldest published newspaper in Morocco after being founded by Rober-Raynaud in 1905.
- Lissan-ul-Maghreb (Arabic: لِسَانُ المَغرِب) was a Moroccan arabophone newspaper established in Tangier in 1907. It was founded by two Lebanese brothers, Faraj-Allah Namor and Artur Namor.
- El Horria - La Liberté was a Judeo-Moroccan newspaper published in Tangier by Salomon Benaioun in two versions: one in Judeo-Moroccan Arabic (was published in 1914) and one in French (was published in 1915).
- Democracia was a Spanish language Republican weekly newspaper published from Tangier. The office of Democracia was located at Petit Socco.
- The Tangier Gazette was run by American journalists Lamar Hoover and William Augustus Bird (aka Bill Bird) from 1945 until its closure in 1962.
- Antaeus, a literary magazine founded in 1970, was first published in Tangier by Daniel Halpern and Paul Bowles before being shifted to New York City in the mid-1980s.

== Films and television ==
- Tangier American film featuring María Montez, Robert Paige and Sabu – 1946
- Mission in Tangier (French: Mission à Tanger) a 1949 French drama film directed by André Hunebelle and starring Raymond Rouleau, Gaby Sylvia and Mila Parély.
- My Favorite Spy, Bob Hope and Hedy Lamarr spy comedy set mainly in Tangier – 1951
- Flight to Tangier (Charles Marquis Warren) – 1953
- Tangier Incident (1953) – an American agent posing as a black market operator, is in Tangier on a mission to stop the plans of three atomic scientists who are there to pool their secrets and sell them in a package to the Communists.
- That Man from Tangier (in Spanish Aquel Hombre de Tanger) featuring Sara Montiel – 1953
- Poison Ivy (1953) Some of its scenes were filmed in Tangier.
- Tangier Assignment (1955) Location shooting took place around Tangier in Morocco.
- Mr. Arkadin (also released as Confidential Report) is a 1955 film, Tangier serves as a key international location where the protagonist investigates Gregory Arkadin’s mysterious past. Orson Welles utilized the city's exotic "Film Noir" atmosphere, filming at iconic spots like the Grand Socco and El Minzah Hotel.
- Tangier, an episode of the television series Passport to Danger starring Cesar Romero – 1955
- Man from Tangier (a.k.a. Thunder Over Tangier) – 1957
- The Man in the Cage, an episode of the television series Thriller. The episode stars Philip Carey. – 1961
- From Russia with Love (1963) – the villain, Donald "Red" Grant, was recruited by "SPECTRE" in Tangier in 1962, whilst on the run from the law
- Espionage in Tangier. A thriller of a secret agent out to snag a dangerous molecular ray-gun – 1965
- Requiem for a Secret Agent (1966), Italian spy thriller shot in Tangier and Marrakesh
- The Man from U.N.C.L.E. episode The "J" for Judas Affair – 1967
- The Nautch of Tangier (aka The Witchmaker) – 1969
- A Suitcase for a Corpse is a 1970 Italian-Spanish giallo film.
- The Wind and the Lion (1975) – Based on the Perdicaris incident of 1904, this film, starring Sean Connery, Candice Bergen, and Brian Keith, takes place largely in Tangier. The film's Tangier, however, was actually created in the Spanish cities of Seville and Almeria.
- Black Sunday (1977) its scenes that set in Lebanon were notably filmed in Tangier.
- Tangier (1982), spy thriller with Ronny Cox and Billie Whitelaw
- The Living Daylights (1987) – a James Bond movie where he hunts Brad Whitaker down at his Tangier headquarters
- Prick Up Your Ears (1987) – Joe Orton (Gary Oldman) and Kenneth Halliwell (Alfred Molina) visit Tangier, the scene represents the 88-day holiday that Joe Orton took after the failure of his play Loot
- The Sheltering Sky, starring John Malkovich and Debra Winger. Bernardo Bertolucci's adaptation of the novel by Paul Bowles. Married American artists Port and Kit Moresby travel aimlessly through North Africa, searching for new experiences that could give sense to their relationship. But the flight to distant regions only leads both deeper into despair. – 1990
- Directed by David Cronenberg, the 1991 film Naked Lunch depicts a surrealist version of Tangier called "Interzone" but was filmed entirely in Toronto due to the Gulf War. It captures the hallucinogenic atmosphere of William S. Burroughs' time writing the novel at Tangier’s Hotel El Muniria during the city's International Zone era.
- Tangiers, July 1909, segment of Young Indiana Jones Chronicles episodes edited into 1992 episode "Young Indiana Jones and the Curse of the Jackal"
- Casino (1995), a movie directed by Martin Scorsese depicts the mainstay casino as 'Tangiers' . The movie stars Joe Pesci and Robert De Niro
- Legionnaire (1998) the film was filmed in Morocco at Tangier and Ouarzazate.
- Loin, is a 2001 French-Spanish drama film, set in Tangier in a three-day period, tells the story of three young friends making critical decisions about their uncertain future.
- Box 507 (Spanish: La caja 507) is a 2002 Spanish action thriller film, some of its scenes set in Tangier.
- Changing Times, a 2004 French drama film, a successful French civil engineer, travels to Tangier to supervise the construction of buildings for a large media center. His real motivation, however, is to seek out his first love from thirty years before, having discovered that she lives in Tangier.
- The Bourne Ultimatum, an espionage movie featuring Matt Damon – Jason Bourne tracks a man through the city who has information on his (Bourne's) past. – 2007
- Inception featuring Leonardo DiCaprio – 2010: The city was used to film the scenes set in Mombasa, Kenya
- Agent Vinod (2012 film), an Indian spy action film by Sriram Raghavan. Set in Tangier and other locations in Morocco.
- My Way released in France as Cloclo, is a 2012 French biographical drama film about the life of French singer, songwriter and entertainer Claude François.
- Archer – the title character Sterling Archer is revealed to have been born in Tangier, where his valet and caretaker Woodhouse once owned a bar; season 4 episode 10, Un Chien Tangerine (March 2013), takes place in Tangier.
- Only Lovers Left Alive (2013) – Tilda Swinton's character, Eve, lives in Tangier.
- El tiempo entre costuras (The Time in Between), Spanish period drama television series, has scenes set in Tangier – 2013
- The Informant (French: Gibraltar) is a 2013 French crime thriller film parts of the film were shot in Tangier.
- Rock the Casbah is a 2013 French-Moroccan drama film set and filmed in Tangier.
- Spectre (2015): James Bond visits a hotel named L'American.
- In 2016, in the penultimate episode of Downton Abbey, it is revealed that Bertie Hexham's cousin, the Marquess of Hexham, died in Tangiers, leaving Bertie to be the new Marquess of Hexham.
- Vagabond (Korean: 배가본드; RR: Baegabondeu), South Korean television series, has scenes set in Tangier – 2019 (filming began in June 2018)
- In 2021, in the first episode of the rebooted The Equalizer series, the title character (played by Queen Latifah) plans around a rescue tactic that she and her CIA contact utilized in Tangier.
- Indiana Jones and the Dial of Destiny is a 2023 American action-adventure film. Although the scenes take place in Tangier according to the plot, the actual filming was done in other locations like Fez.

== Music ==
- Tangier – American hard rock band.
- Tangiers – a Canadian rock music band.
- "If You See Her, Say Hello" by Bob Dylan on his Blood On The Tracks album – The song's opening line is, "If you see her say 'hello', she might be in Tangier."
- Sartori in Tangier by King Crimson – derives its title from Beat Generation influences including the Jack Kerouac novel Satori in Paris, and the city of Tangier, where a number of Beat writers resided and which they often used as a setting for their writing.
- "Waiting in Tangier" – a track in the album Woman to Woman of Fem2fem band.
- "Tangier" by the Scottish musician Donovan on his album The Hurdy Gurdy Man.
- Live at Tangiers – a solo by Michael Stanley
- "Tangiers" – an instrumental piece by John Powell featured in The Bourne Ultimatum
- My Tangier – Dave Crockett (circa 1980s)
- Intrigue in Tangiers – a track from the album What Does Anything Mean? Basically by The Chameleons.
- Idaho by Josh Ritter – "I got your letter in Tangier".
- Guantanamo by Outlandish Or we can lounge in Tangier – Not the one in Vegas, naah the one in Maroc
- Tangiers by Billy Thorpe – a concept album about Tangier, inspired by Thorpe's several visits there.
- Night Train by Looptroop – a song about travelling by night train and noticing diffidences caused by time, place and circumstances; Promoe's singing about his trip around Morocco "I'm on the night train from Tangier to Marrakesh"
- Hacker by Death Grips – First line of the song is "Going back to Tangier, with some Jordans and a Spear"
- "Intrigue in Tangiers" English band featuring Roger Hill & Mel Jones. Since 2008 "Intrigue in Tangiers" have released 9 studio albums, 2 live albums and a "best of".
- Style by Taylor Swift – the popular tourist attraction Caves of Hercules, located in Tangier, is shown on the music video of the 2015 hit song by Taylor Swift.
- Shock Treatment, the title song from the Richard O'Brien musical of the same name - "I'm not a loco with motive to suture myself/I've been a cynic for too many years/Playing doctor and nurse, it can be good for your health/I've seen clinics with those gimmicks in Tangiers."

== Paintings ==
- HMS Mary Rose and pirates by Willem van de Velde (a painting ascribed to Willem van de Velde, taken from the book: William Laird Clowes (ed.): The Royal Navy. A History From the Earliest Times to the Present, Vol. 2, London 1898)
- Market Day Outside the Walls of Tangiers by Louis Comfort Tiffany (1873 – Smithsonian American Art Museum)
- Harvest of a journey to Spain and Tangiers, The Great Mosque, and Serpent Charmers of Sokko – a painting by Emile Wauters (c. 1911–1916)
- Window at Tangier by the French artist Henri Matisse (1912 – The Pushkin Museum of Fine Arts, Moscow).
- Virtual Tangier: Visions of the City by Matisse (1913)

== Radio ==
- "A Ticket to Tangiers" is an episode of The Adventures of Harry Lime
