= Jesus of Nazareth (TV series) =

1977 British-Italian television drama

- VHS cover art
- Genre: Biblical; Biography; Drama; History
- Based on: The Gospels
- Written by: Anthony Burgess; Suso Cecchi d'Amico; Franco Zeffirelli; David Butler (additional dialogue)
- Directed by: Franco Zeffirelli
- Starring: Robert Powell; Olivia Hussey; Anne Bancroft; Ernest Borgnine; Claudia Cardinale; Valentina Cortese; Cyril Cusack; James Farentino; James Earl Jones; Stacy Keach; Tony Lo Bianco; James Mason; Ian McShane; Laurence Olivier; Donald Pleasence; Christopher Plummer; Anthony Quinn; Fernando Rey; Rod Steiger; Peter Ustinov; Michael York
- Theme music composer: Maurice Jarre
- Countries of origin: Italy; United Kingdom
- Original language: English
- No. of episodes: 4

Production
- Producers: Lew Grade; Vincenzo Labella
- Cinematography: Armando Nannuzzi; David Watkin
- Editor: Reginald Mills
- Running time: 382 minutes
- Production companies: ITC Entertainment; RAI
- Budget: $45 million

Original release
- Network: Rai 1 (Italy); ITV (United Kingdom)
- Release: 27 March – 24 April 1977

Jesus of Nazareth (Italian: Gesù di Nazareth) is a 1977 epic television drama serial directed by Franco Zeffirelli and co-written by Anthony Burgess and Suso Cecchi d'Amico, which dramatizes the birth, life, ministry, crucifixion and resurrection of Jesus. It stars Robert Powell as Jesus, and features an all-star ensemble cast of renowned actors, including seven who had won or would go on to win Academy Awards: Anne Bancroft, Ernest Borgnine, Laurence Olivier, Christopher Plummer, Anthony Quinn, Rod Steiger, Peter Ustinov; and James Earl Jones who received an Academy Honorary Award. Additionally, the ensemble cast also featured Academy Award nominees James Mason, Ian Holm, Ian Bannen and Valentina Cortese.

Some scenes were added during the writing process, with some characters (such as Zerah) added for brevity or dramatic effect. Jesus of Nazareth depicts Judas Iscariot as initially well-intentioned, but later as a selfish dupe of Zerah's who betrays Jesus largely as a result of Zerah's false platitudes and pretexts. However, in accordance with the Gospels, the film depicts Nicodemus and Joseph of Arimathea as sympathetic members of the Sanhedrin. Many of the miracles of Jesus, such as the changing of water into wine at the wedding at Cana, the transfiguration, and the calming of the storm, are not shown, although Jesus's healing of Jairus's daughter, healing the centurion's servant, the blind man and the crippled woman on the Sabbath, the feeding of the multitude, and the raising of Lazarus from the dead are presented.

Jesus of Nazareth premiered on 27 March 1977, on the Italian channel Rai 1, and was first aired in the United Kingdom, on 3 April 1977, on the ITV Network. It was a huge ratings success and received acclaim, with particular praise for Powell's portrayal of Jesus.

== Plot summary ==
The narrative of Jesus of Nazareth is a kind of cinematic Diatessaron, or Gospel harmony, blending all four New Testament accounts. It presents Jesus as both God and man. During the baptism of Jesus in the River Jordan, John speaks God's words "this is my beloved son." The familiar Christian episodes are presented chronologically: the betrothal, and later marriage, of Mary and Joseph; the Annunciation; the Visitation; the circumcision of John the Baptist; the Nativity of Jesus; the visit of the Magi; the circumcision of Jesus; the Census of Quirinius; the flight into Egypt and Massacre of the Innocents; the Finding in the Temple; the Baptism of Jesus.

Gospel accounts depicted also include the woman caught in adultery; the healing of Jairus' daughter; Jesus helping Peter catch the fish; the Parable of the Prodigal Son; a dialogue between Jesus and Barabbas (non-Biblical); Matthew's dinner party; the Sermon on the Mount; debating with Joseph of Arimathea; the curing of the blind man at the pool; the Raising of Lazarus (John 11:43); the Feeding of the Five Thousand; the entry into Jerusalem; Jesus and the money changers; the Parable of the Two Sons; healing the centurion's servant; dialogue with Nicodemus; the Last Supper; the betrayal of Jesus by Judas.

At the Sanhedrin trial of Jesus, Jesus is accused of blasphemy for calling himself the son of the God of Israel. Caiaphas announces "the LORD our God, the LORD is one", denying the God of Israel has a son. Ensuing scenes include Peter's denial of Christ and subsequent repenting; the judgment of Jesus by Pilate ("Ecce Homo"); the Johannine Passion Narrative (John 18–19; including the Agony in the Garden); the Carrying of the Cross; the Crucifixion of Christ (Sir Laurence Olivier's Nicodemus recites the "Suffering Servant" passage (Isaiah 53:3-5) as he looks helplessly on the crucified Messiah); the discovery of the empty tomb; and an appearance of the Risen Christ to his Disciples. The storyline concludes with the non-Biblical character Zerah and his colleagues gazing despairingly into the empty tomb. Zerah laments, "Now it begins. It all begins".

== Cast ==
Starring

- Robert Powell as Jesus

Guest stars

- Anne Bancroft as Mary Magdalene
- Ernest Borgnine as the Roman Centurion
- Claudia Cardinale as the Adulteress
- Valentina Cortese as Herodias
- James Farentino as Peter
- James Earl Jones as Balthazar
- Stacy Keach as Barabbas
- Tony Lo Bianco as Quintillius
- James Mason as Joseph of Arimathea
- Ian McShane as Judas Iscariot
- Laurence Olivier as Nicodemus
- Donald Pleasence as Melchior
- Christopher Plummer as Herod Antipas
- Anthony Quinn as Caiaphas
- Fernando Rey as Gaspar
- Ralph Richardson as Simeon
- Rod Steiger as Pontius Pilate
- Peter Ustinov as Herod the Great
- Michael York as John the Baptist

And

- Olivia Hussey as Mary

Also starring

- Cyril Cusack as Yehuda
- Ian Holm as Zerah
- Yorgo Voyagis as Joseph

With

- Ian Bannen as Amos
- Marina Berti as Elizabeth
- Regina Bianchi as Anne
- Maria Carta as Martha
- Lee Montague as Habakkuk
- Renato Rascel as The Blind Man
- Oliver Tobias as Joel

Co-starring

- Norman Bowler as Saturninus
- Robert Beatty as Proculus
- John Phillips as Naso
- Ken Jones as Jotham
- Nancy Nevinson as Abigail
- Renato Terra as Abel
- Roy Holder as Enoch
- Jonathan Adams as Adam
- Lorenzo Monet as Jesus aged 12 years
- Robert Davey as Daniel
- Oliver Smith as Saul
- George Camiller as Hosias
- Murray Salem as Simon the Zealot
- Tony Vogel as Andrew
- Michael Cronin as Eliphaz
- Steve Gardner as Philip
- Derek Godfrey as Elihu
- Renato Montalbano as Jairus
- John Duttine as John
- Michael Haughey as Nahum
- Keith Skinner as Possessed Boy
- Cyril Shaps as Possessed Boy's Father
- Jonathan Muller as James, son of Zebedee
- John Tordoff as Malachi
- Isabel Mestres as Salome
- Bruce Lidington as Thomas
- Keith Washington as Matthew
- Mimmo Crao as Jude Thaddeus
- John Eastham as Bartholomew
- Sergio Nicolai as James, son of Alphaeus
- Francis de Wolff as Simon the Pharisee
- Antonello Campodifiori as Ircanus
- Paul Curran as Samuel
- Tim Pearce as Rufus
- Mark Eden as Quartus
- Bruno Barnabe as Ezra
- Simon MacCorkindale as Lucius
- Forbes Collins as Jonas
- Lionel Guyett as Haggai
- Soni Razdan as Lily
- Martin Benson as Pharisee
- Peter Harlowe as Valerius
- Carl Forgione as Plotinus
- Donald Sumpter as Aram
- Pino Colizzi as Jobab
- Robert Brown as Pharisee
- Harold Bennett as Elder
- Robert Mallard as Quazra
- Abdelmajid Lakhal as the Farisaeum
- Christopher Reich as Circumcision Priest and as Metellus

=== Previous collaborations with Zeffirelli ===
Several cast members had already featured in previous Zeffirelli productions. British actors Hussey, York, Holder, Lovell and Skinner had featured in Romeo and Juliet as Juliet, Tybalt, Peter, Sampson and Balthasar respectively. Additionally, Olivier did uncredited work as the narrator and dubbing voice of Lord Montague. Colizzi, who appeared as Jobab, had previously dubbed York's Tybalt in the Italian version of Romeo and Juliet. Colizzi also dubbed Robert Powell in the Italian version of this miniseries, and in order to avoid having two characters with the same voice, another actor (Cesare Barbetti) dubbed Colizzi's lines. Claudia Cardinale, Valentina Cortese, Regina Bianchi, Maria Carta and Renato Rascel dubbed themselves in the Italian dub.

== Production ==
=== Development ===
The drama was conceived when Lew Grade was received by Pope Paul VI, who congratulated him on the making of Moses the Lawgiver, a 1974 television film starring Burt Lancaster and produced by Grade's ITC Entertainment and the Italian television network RAI. At the end of the interview, the Pope told him he hoped his next project would be about the life of Jesus. Two weeks later, while dining with an RAI executive, Grade told him he intended their companies to prepare such a film. Directing duties were offered to Franco Zeffirelli – a religious Roman Catholic who knew the Pontiff from his days as the Archbishop of Milan, when he often visited Zeffirelli's school – on the Pope's initiative, who insisted that either he would make Jesus of Nazareth or no one else. The director rejected the proposal at first, but Grade finally convinced him to agree; he accepted the job shortly before Christmas 1973.

Screenwriter Anthony Burgess later recounted the launching of the project in an essay entitled "Telejesus (or Mediachrist)":

The notion of making a six-hour television film on the life of Jesus Christ was proposed by an ennobled British Jew, with the golden blessing of an American automobile corporation. The project struck some as blasphemous, others as ecumenical. Lord Grade, then Sir Lew Grade, presided over a massive press conference in the Holy City, (Rome), and said all that was available to be said—namely, that there would be this film, that Zeffirelli would direct it, and that Burgess would write it. Fired by this announcement, the Romans laid on a great, as it were, First Supper, which the Chief Rabbi of Rome attended, as well as various cricket-playing British ecclesiastics. Sir Lew Grade was made a Cavaliere of the Republic. The Pope was noticeably absent.

Both Grade and Zeffirelli insisted their adaptation of Jesus's life should be "ecumenical", coherent, even to non-believers, and "acceptable to all denominations". To ensure the film's accuracy, the producers consulted experts from the Vatican, the Leo Baeck Rabbinical College of London, and the Koranic School at Meknes, Morocco. However, when Zeffirelli asked Rabbi Albert Friedlander to help him create Jesus's Bar Mitzvah scene, the latter replied that such ceremonies were practised only from the 15th century. The director, however, insisted on including it, and Friedlander tried to teach child actor Lorenzo Monet to read a short portion of the Pentateuch in Hebrew. Monet, however, mumbled it and the director was not satisfied (in the film, boy Jesus reads mostly in English).

=== Casting Jesus ===
The producers at first considered choosing a well-known star, who would draw a large audience, for the role of Christ. The first actor thought of was Dustin Hoffman, and Al Pacino was also a candidate. Zeffirelli decided to look for an actor whom the audience would immediately identify as Jesus. For example, Hoffman and Pacino both stand at just 5'6", and neither man's face bears a resemblance to Jesus as depicted in art, which has been based for many centuries on the image found on The Shroud of Turin. The image on the shroud is that of a man who is 6'. Eventually, the character's likeness was influenced by Warner Sallman's portrait painting Head of Christ: Paul Harvey and Edward J. Blum wrote the show "put Sallman's imagination in motion". The Virgin Mary was depicted by Olivia Hussey.

The idea to cast Robert Powell originated with Grade's wife, Kathie Moody, who told her husband the actor had "wonderful blue eyes" after watching his performance in a BBC television adaptation of Thomas Hardy's Jude the Obscure. Powell came under criticism from religious groups for "living in sin" with his companion, dancer Barbara Lord of Pan's People, while intending to portray Jesus. The couple married shortly before production began. As of 2025, Powell and Lord have been married for 50 years.

Powell rarely blinks throughout the entire film, mimicking, in this respect, H. B. Warner in 1927's The King of Kings and Max von Sydow in 1965's The Greatest Story Ever Told. This effect was a deliberate decision by Zeffirelli. James Houlden commented that the result was "a penetrating, unrelenting eye contact with Jesus's." A dark blue eyeliner was applied on set to accentuate Powell's blue eyes. Powell's portrayal has since become an often-used image in popular devotional art, and "defined the visual image of Christ in the minds of the audience... Perhaps more than any other Jesus film."

For the crucifixion scene, Powell starved himself on a diet of only cheese for twelve days prior to shooting "in order to look worn".

=== Filming ===
Principal photography was carried out in Morocco and Tunisia from September 1975 to May 1976. The synagogue scenes were shot with extras from the Jewish community in the island of Djerba. The city of Monastir in Tunisia served as 1st-century Jerusalem. Ernest Borgnine, who portrayed Cornelius the Centurion, recalled that since regulations required hiring local extras—most with poor English—for many of the smaller roles, they had to be dubbed. Zeffirelli decided to avoid recording sound altogether in many parts, and simply send the principal actors to dub their own characters in the studio later. The standing sets were later used by the British comedy troupe Monty Python for their 1979 religious satire Life of Brian.

The shoot of Jesus of Nazareth in Tunisia coincided with the shooting of Star Wars nearby. Actress Koo Stark, who was filming Star Wars on-site but was later cut from the film, stated that a problem with a radio-control transmitter caused a malfunctioning R2-D2 to "run away," and the errant droid subsequently "wandered onto the set of Jesus of Nazareth."

Reports regarding the budget vary: Presbyterian Survey stated $12 million; The Listener cited £9 million (roughly $16 million); and Third Way with £11.5 million (roughly $20 million). Other sources give the sum of $18 million. In his autobiography, Grade wrote that "in the final accounting, Jesus of Nazareth took $45 million."

== Reception ==
=== Broadcasts and ratings ===
Jesus of Nazareth premiered on 27 March 1977 on the Italian channel Rai 1; it was broadcast in five episodes, one shown weekly until 25 April. On Palm Sunday, 3 April 1977 – the date of the airing of the second episode – the Pope endorsed the programme in his public address for the holiday and recommended the faithful to view it. The series enjoyed high ratings: the German Dominican friar and film critic Ambros Eichenberger reported that according to local surveys, 84% of the television owners in the larger cities watched the series. For example, the number of viewers for the third episode, aired on 10 April, was estimated to have been 28.3 million.

In the United Kingdom and in the United States, it was broadcast in two parts, albeit in different lengths, by the ITV network in the UK and by NBC in the US. In both countries, the first part was aired on 3 April and the second on Easter, 10 April 1977. During its original showing in the UK, Jesus of Nazareth had an estimated audience of 21 million viewers.

When the first episode was broadcast in the US, it was a major success. The New York Times reported it "swamped all competing programs on Sunday night", with overnight Nielsen ratings of 53% in Los Angeles and 46% in New York City. The miniseries as a whole received a Nielsen rating of 30.8 points, with each point representing approximately 712,000 television-owning homes, and an audience share of 50% nationwide, on both nights. The company calculated that Jesus attracted about 90 million viewers.

In West Germany, it was broadcast by ZDF in four episodes on the 19th, 21st, 23rd and 24 March 1978; 40% of the audience have viewed it.

Jesus of Nazareth turned into a massive commercial success and is one of the most widely marketed, most critically acclaimed and best-known productions about Christ's life. Grade stated that it made "a net profit of $30 million."

=== Critical response ===
Famously, Pope Paul VI praised Zeffirelli's film, both in private comment and in a public address on Palm Sunday prior to the miniseries’ Holy Week debut on Italian television.

Reviews were notably positive. Writing for The Washington Post, Tom Shales was effusive: “One is tempted to call it a miracle… [Zeffirelli] has an eye for composition and lighting that is unprecedented in television films…There may never have been a religious film with so pervasive a sense of place and period…. The intrinsic dramatic and symbolic values of the story, which have eluded past filmmakers, come through with striking clarity”. Shales praised Olivia Hussey as Mary for being “simultaneously fragile, mystified and strong”. However, “Powell's appearance [as Jesus] is a drawback here. Though it may be commendable that he in no way resembles the fair-haired Aryan stereotype dominant in such films for years, Powell looks so wan and gaunt that one fears for his health. The work is, despite flaws, a truly impressive accomplishment.”

Powell's performance as Jesus in particular has been praised by critics.

=== Accolades ===
Jesus of Nazareth received an Emmy Award nomination for Outstanding Special Drama. Additionally, James Farentino, who portrayed the apostle Peter, received a nomination for Outstanding Performance by a Supporting Actor in a Drama Special, the production's lone acting nominee.

The drama was nominated for six British Academy Television Awards: Best Actor, Best Cameraman, Best Single Television Play, Best Editor, Best Costume Design, and Best Sound.

Jesus of Nazareth won awards for Best Cinematography to Armando Nannuzzi, Best Costume Design to Lucia Mirisola, and Best Production Design, to Mirisola again, from the Italian National Syndicate of Film Journalists.

== Controversy ==
Before its initial broadcast, Jesus of Nazareth came under ideological fire from some American Protestant fundamentalists, led by Bob Jones III, president of Bob Jones University in South Carolina, and Dr. Bill Bright, because they felt the TV movie had to have the resurrection of Jesus Christ to be true to the Gospel account. Zeffirelli had told an interviewer from Modern Screen that the film would portray Jesus as "an ordinary man – gentle, fragile, simple". Jones interpreted this as meaning that the portrayal would deny Christ's divine nature. Having never seen the film, Jones denounced it as "blasphemy". Others picked up the cry and 18,000 letters were sent to General Motors, which had provided $3 million of the film's cost. Sacrificing its investment, GM backed out of its sponsorship. Procter and Gamble eventually took it over, buying the U.S. rights for a relatively low price of some $1 million. Their financial support allowed the mini-series to be screened after a simulated resurrection was added at the suggestion of Dr. Ted Baehr, a theologian and media pundit, who was friends with the producer, Vincenzo Labella, and acquainted with the protesters. The scenes showed the empty tomb, and then cut to Jesus discussing his death and resurrection with his disciples.

== Subsequent broadcasts and home media ==
NBC rebroadcast the series in 1979, 1980, 1984, 1987 and 1990.

It was originally released in the early 1980s in the US as a three-tape VHS edition under the Magnetic Video label. It was released later under the mainstream video label of CBS/Fox in 1986. Another three-tape VHS edition was released by LIVE Home Video in 1992 and again on 22 February 1995. Artisan Entertainment released the DVD version on two discs in February 2000. In the UK, the original 1986 Polygram VHS (four tapes) was fully uncut and featured the full 386-minute version. The 2000 Carlton video (two tapes) featured a heavily abridged print running for 270 minutes. The Granada DVD is credited as the unedited print and runs for 374 minutes, but this is due to the PAL speed up and is the full version. The two additional scenes – a private meeting between Judas Iscariot and Zerah, and the opening betrayal sequence during the Last Supper – were actually added in the repeat UK screening 2 years later and therefore are not included as the DVD is the original 1977 cut.

The serial is broadcast every Easter and Christmas in many countries, including Greece on ANT1, and in the United States on History Channel and TBN.

In Chile, the full serial has been broadcast every Good Friday since 1982 by the public service television broadcaster Televisión Nacional de Chile.

The Region 1 DVD is the original 1977 broadcast. The first Region 2 Carlton DVD released in the UK in 2000 was substantially cut and ran to 270 minutes. But a second UK DVD, released in 2011, is the complete original 1977 broadcast. The Dutch DVD release (also Carlton Region 2) has a running time of 365 minutes (the 399-minute running time stated on the cover is a misprint).

The drama has been released on digital download (or streaming) for both Google Play and the Apple Store. The version released is the completed original 4-part 1977 broadcast, though only in its original Standard Definition. Similar to other special interest content, the film's copyright has only been loosely enforced in more recent years, resulting in it appearing on Google's advertising-paid platform YouTube in its entirety.

For Easter 2016, and again in 2018, the UK's Sky Arts channel showed one part a day over the four days of Easter. The version they used was the extended four-part edition, totaling eight hours with advertising.

The serial ran on NBC as "The Big Event" in two three-hour installments with limited commercials on Palm Sunday and Easter Sunday. Additional footage was added for a 1979 re-run and broadcast in four two-hour installments. In the 1980s and 1990, the film was re-broadcast on NBC in three installments of two- and three-hour episodes, released on VHS and DVD as one complete presentation with one set of credits.

In 2022, the full series was made available on BritBox in the UK in time for Easter.

== Books ==
Two adaptations of Jesus of Nazareth have been published. Jesus of Nazareth (1977), by Scottish theologian William Barclay, is a novelisation of the miniseries, published as a conventionally-sized paperback novel as well as a large-format hardback with extensive colour photographs from the miniseries. Man of Nazareth (1979) is Anthony Burgess' novel based upon his original script for the Jesus of Nazareth miniseries. The novel allowed Burgess to retain and expand upon elements of his script that the miniseries altered or omitted, and as a result, Man of Nazareth contains significant differences to Jesus of Nazareth. Burgess' direct sequel to Man of Nazareth, the novel The Kingdom of the Wicked (1985), was adapted to television in 1985 as A.D. (which features some actors who had appeared in Jesus of Nazareth, albeit in different roles).

Franco Zeffirelli's account of filming Jesus of Nazareth was published in 1984 as Franco Zeffirelli's Jesus: A Spiritual Diary (1984).

== See also ==
- A.D.
- List of Easter television episodes
