= Card-carrying communist =

Derogatory term for members of left-wing organizations

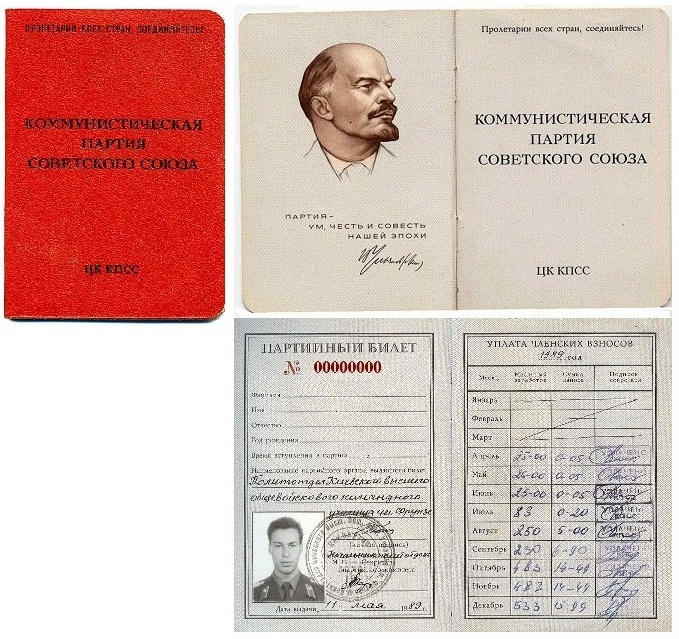
Communist Party of the Soviet Union membership card, 1989

"Card-carrying communist" is a term popularised in the United States during the Second Red Scare as a label for members of communist and far-left organisations, especially the Communist Party of the United States. The term is still considered derogatory when used in its Cold War context.

== History of the phrase ==
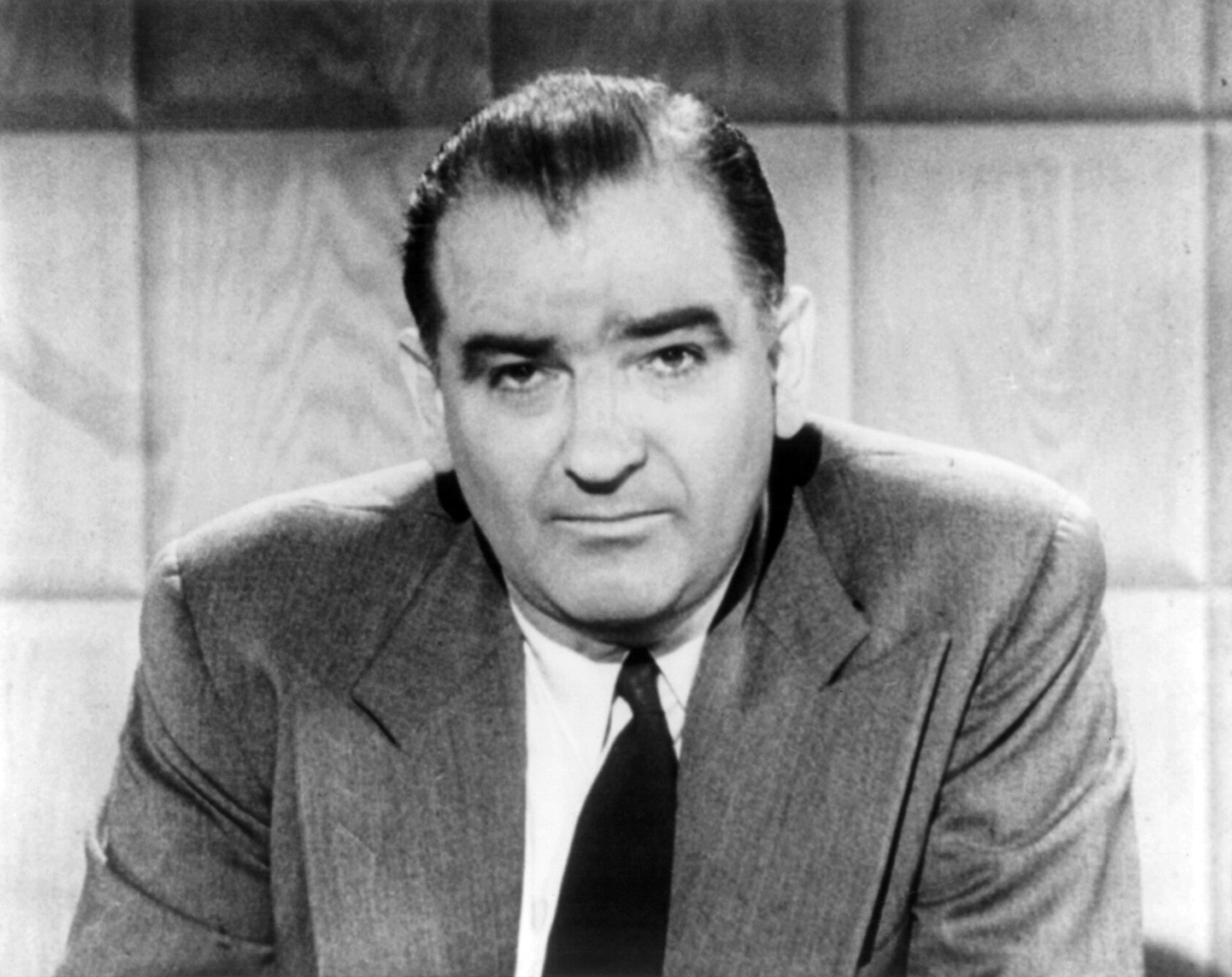
Senator Joseph McCarthy alleged that the United States Department of State had been infiltrated by "card-carrying communists."

The term "card-carrying" originally had no political connotation, and was used to describe membership in any organisation. For example, Anabaptist Christians of the Schwarzenau Brethren Churches, such as the Dunkard Brethren Church, have carried The Brethren's Card on their person since 1887.

During the Second Red Scare, the term was used as a label for members of the Communist Party, and was used in this manner by both the House Un-American Activities Committee investigations and Senator Joseph McCarthy. In the context of politics, the term remains derogatory. After the 1950s, the scope of the word expanded and is used for non-political applications.

Senator McCarthy claimed there were fifty-seven "card-carrying communists" working for the United States Department of State, an allegation that was widely reported by American newspapers. This figure was different from the 205 "bad risks" figure, confusing reporters. The "fifty-seven card-carrying Communists" phrase first appears in a radio interview that McCarthy gave in Salt Lake City, and is the phrase that appears in the Congressional Record on the speech he gave at Wheeling. McCarthy made a distinction between "card-carrying communists" and what he called "fellow travelers." A card-carrying communist was considered a genuine member of the party, while a fellow traveler only sympathised with the ideology.

== History of communist membership cards ==
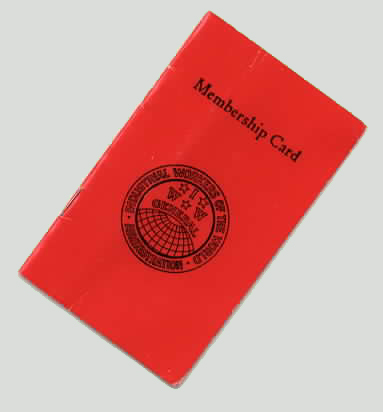
A membership card of the Industrial Workers of the World, a left-wing internationalist union.

Early in the Cold War, there were Communist Party members who kept membership cards, although many also hid their membership. Possibly the earliest mention of the phrase comes from a 1912 article in the Daily People, which mentioned "'Union-card' carrying members". A closer reference to the modern term was a 1918 piece in the New York Tribune, which described members of the Industrial Workers of the World, a prominent socialist union, as "red-card-carrying 'wobblies'".

Because of the advent of digital technology, the contemporary Communist Party USA does not issue membership cards.

== Response ==
Many Protestant and Catholic Christians, as well as political conservatives, worked together to popularize wallet-sized or pocket images of The Head of Christ by Warner Sallman, promoting the idea that "there ought to be 'card-carrying Christians' to counter the effect of 'card-carrying communists'." Up until the collapse of the Soviet Union in the 1990s, the Head of Christ "had been printed more than 500 million times and had achieved global iconic status." However, the use of holy cards by Christians (including Sunday School cards by Protestants) predates communism.

== See also ==
- Pinko
- Red Scare
- McCarthyism
