= Here Comes Everybody =

Here Comes Everybody may refer to:

- Hugh Culling Eardley Childers (1827–1896), a British statesman whose nickname was "Here Comes Everybody"
- Here Comes Everybody, a 1923 sketch by James Joyce published in 1925, which formed the basis for early chapters of the novel Finnegans Wake
- Humphrey Chimpden Earwicker, the protagonist of James Joyce's 1939 novel Finnegans Wake, frequently referred to by the acronymic moniker "Here Comes Everybody"
- Here Comes Everybody: An Introduction to James Joyce for the Ordinary Reader (1965), a critical study by Anthony Burgess
- Here Comes Everybody (1985), an album by The Wake
- Here Comes Everybody (book), by Clay Shirky, 2008
- Here Comes Everybody (photography book), by Chris Killip, 2009
- Here Comes Everybody: The Story of the Pogues, a 2012 memoir by James Fearnley
- Here Comes Everybody (album), by Spacey Jane, 2022
