= Pinko =

American political insult for someone sympathetic to communism

Pinko is a pejorative term for a person on the left of the political spectrum. The term has its origins in the notion that pink is a lighter shade of red, a color associated with communism. Thus pink could describe a "lighter form of communism", purportedly promoted by supporters and believers of socialism who were not themselves actual or "card-carrying" communists. The term pinko has a pejorative sense, whereas "pink" in this definition can be used in a purely descriptive sense, such as in the term pink tide.

One of the first recorded uses of pinko was in Time magazine in 1925 as a variant on the noun and adjective pink, which had been used along with parlor pink since the beginning of the 20th century to refer to those of leftish sympathies, usually with an implication of effeteness. In the 1920s, for example, a Wall Street Journal editorial described supporters of the Progressive politician Robert La Follette as "visionaries, ne'er do wells, parlor pinks, reds, hyphenates [Americans with divided allegiance], soft handed agriculturalists and working men who have never seen a shovel."

Pinko was widely used during the Cold War to label individuals accused of supporting the Soviet Union and Communist China, including many supporters of former vice president Henry Wallace's 1948 U.S. presidential campaign of the Progressive Party. Many politicians, like Richard Nixon, exploited the fear of communism by referring to their opponents as "pinkos". The word was predominantly used in the United States, where opposition to Communism grew strong among the population, especially during the McCarthy era. It was also in common use in South Africa during the apartheid era. In his two presidential campaigns, Alabama governor George Wallace often railed at what he called "the left-wing pinko press" and "pseudo-pinko-intellectuals."

Some of the most infamous uses of the term pink came during future president Richard Nixon's 1950 Senate campaign against Helen Gahagan Douglas: "She's pink right down to her underwear!" – a play on the fact that, at the time, pink was the usual color of women's undergarments. Nixon regularly referred to her as "the Pink Lady", and his campaign distributed political flyers printed on sheets of pink paper.

== See also ==
- Anti-communism
- Fellow traveler
- The People's Flag is Palest Pink
- Little Pink
- Political colour
- Red Scare
