= Heinrich Hofmann (painter) =

German painter (1824–1911)

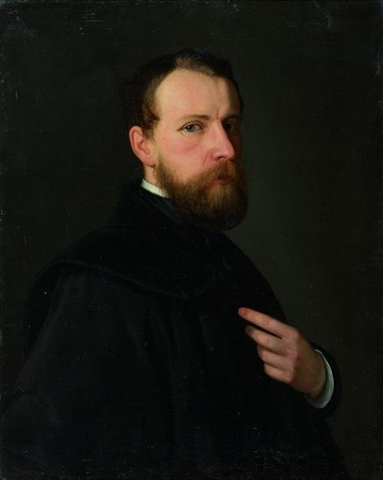
- Self-portrait of Hoffman
- Born: Johann Michael Ferdinand Heinrich Hofmann; 19 March 1824; Darmstadt, Grand Duchy of Hesse and by Rhine, German Confederation
- Died: 23 June 1911 (aged 87); Dresden, Kingdom of Saxony, German Empire
- Known for: Paintings of Jesus Christ
- Notable work: Christ in the Temple; Christ and the Rich Young Ruler; Christ in Gethsemane

Johann Michael Ferdinand Heinrich Hofmann (19 March 1824 – 23 June 1911) was a German painter of the late 19th to early 20th century. He was the uncle of the German painter Ludwig von Hofmann. He was born in Darmstadt and died in Dresden. He is best known for his many paintings depicting the life of Jesus Christ.

== Life ==
Heinrich Hofmann grew up in a family that harbored a deep interest in art. His father, advocate Heinrich Karl Hofmann (1795–1845) painted in watercolors, his mother Sophie Hofmann, née Volhard (1798–1854) gave lessons in art before she married, and his four brothers all showed artistic talent. Heinrich, however, was the only one for whom art was not only a profession but the center of his life.

Hofmann received his first lessons in art from the copper engraver Ernst Rauch in Darmstadt. Then, in 1842, he entered the Academy of Art in Düsseldorf and attended the classes given in painting by Theodor Hildebrandt. Later, he was accepted into the studio of Wilhelm von Schadow and there he created his first large painting: A scene from the life of Alboin, King of the Langobards.

Thereafter, he traveled to the Netherlands and France to intensify his studies of art. In 1846, Hofmann visited the Academy of Art in Antwerp. After passing a longer period of time in Munich he returned to Darmstadt in 1848, and at that time, he began an intensive phase of painting portraits. The young artist found that the political activities of his family opened many doors to influential persons of the time. This afforded him the opportunity to create two portraits of Heinrich von Gagern and one of Justus von Liebig (this portrait is now in the possession of Queen of the United Kingdom). In 1851, Hofmann went to Dresden to visit the art gallery there. In 1853, he traveled to Prague to paint the portrait of Dr. Beer, Great Grand Master of the Brotherhood of the Knights of the Cross.

In 1853, Hofmann returned to Darmstadt, and in the beginning of 1854, his beloved mother died. He was deeply moved by her death and it inspired him to paint his first large religious work: Burial of Christ.

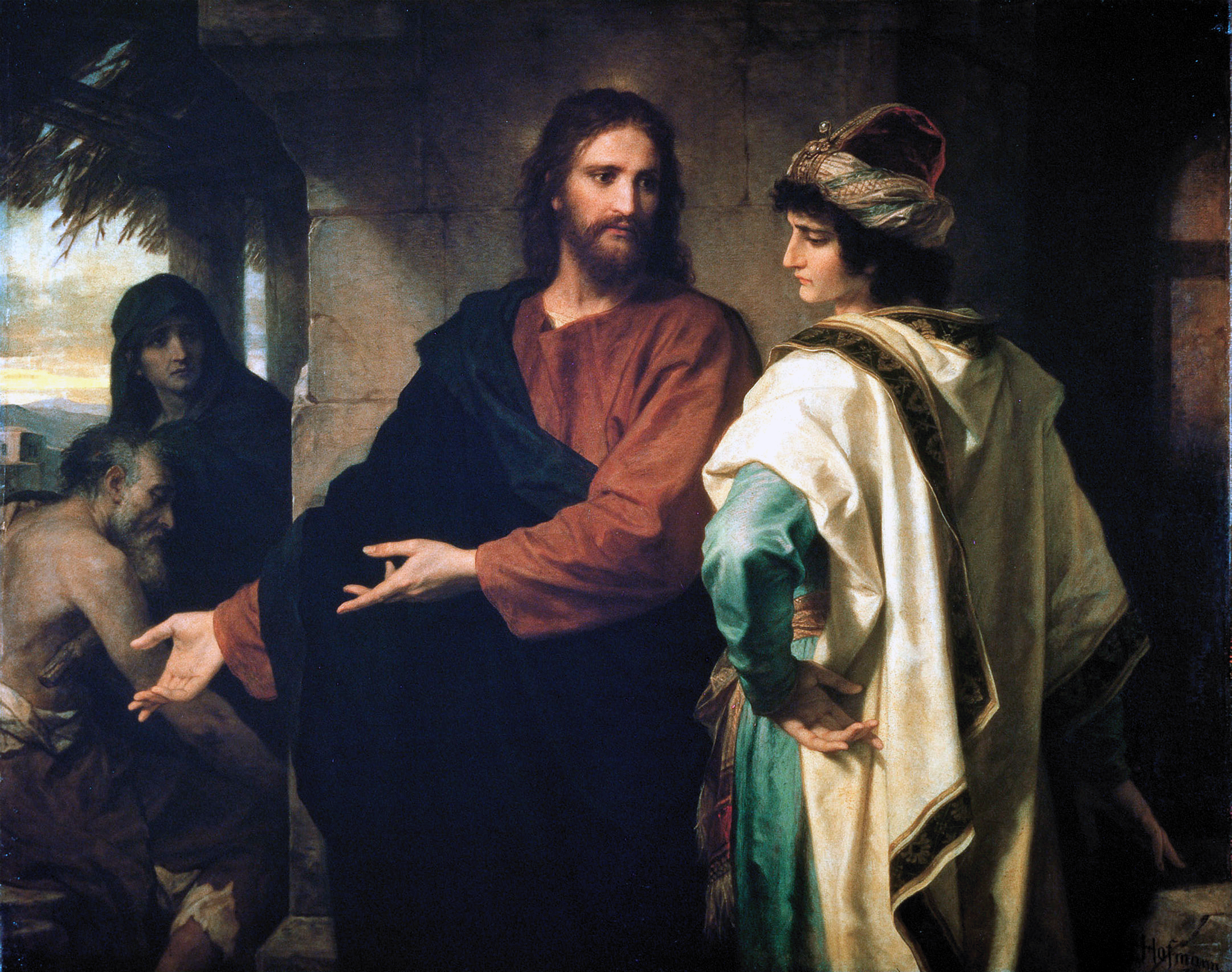
"Christ and the Rich Young Ruler" by Hofmann, 1889.

In fall of 1854, he started on a journey to Italy. His first longer stop was in Venice and he used the time there to study Giorgione, Bellini and Giotto (in nearby Padua). After having proceeded to Florence – where Hofmann stayed for two months – he then went to Rome in January 1855. The comprehensive correspondence with his family and his detailed diary reports convey an impression of his way of painting at that time. He was deeply impressed by artwork of Antiquity, Christianity and the Renaissance.

Not long after his arrival in Rome, he was introduced to Peter von Cornelius (1783–1867) and frequently paid him a visit. When he began his masterpiece The Arrest of Jesus in 1854, this work awakened the interest of Cornelius and for 4 years he accompanied Hofmann with his counsel and his constructive criticism. In 1858 the painting was finished and acquired by the Grand Duchy Art Gallery in Darmstadt. (It is still there – not on exhibition but in the archives of the Hessisches Landesmuseum.)

In 1858, Hofmann returned to Darmstadt and in the following year he married Elisabeth Werner. The couple had no children.

Now another period of painting portraits began. In addition Hofmann created a large altarpiece for the church in Obermörlen (Hesse): “Madonna with Christ Child and apostles Paul and Peter”. Some time later an altarpiece for Væggerløse Church (Denmark) was painted: “The Resurrected Christ”.

In 1862, Hofmann and his wife moved to Dresden. More and more he devoted himself to the genre of religious paintings. In 1870, Heinrich Hofmann was appointed successor of Professor Johann Carl Baehr of the Academy of Art in Dresden whose honorable member he already was. In 1872, King John bestowed on him the Great Golden Medal and later he received the Albrecht-Medal from King Albert. In 1891, Hofmann’s wife died and soon after that he withdrew from the Academy of Art in Dresden. Even though he stopped working for the Academy it is obvious from his letters that in private life he continued to create many works of art until his death on 23 June 1911.

== Body of works ==
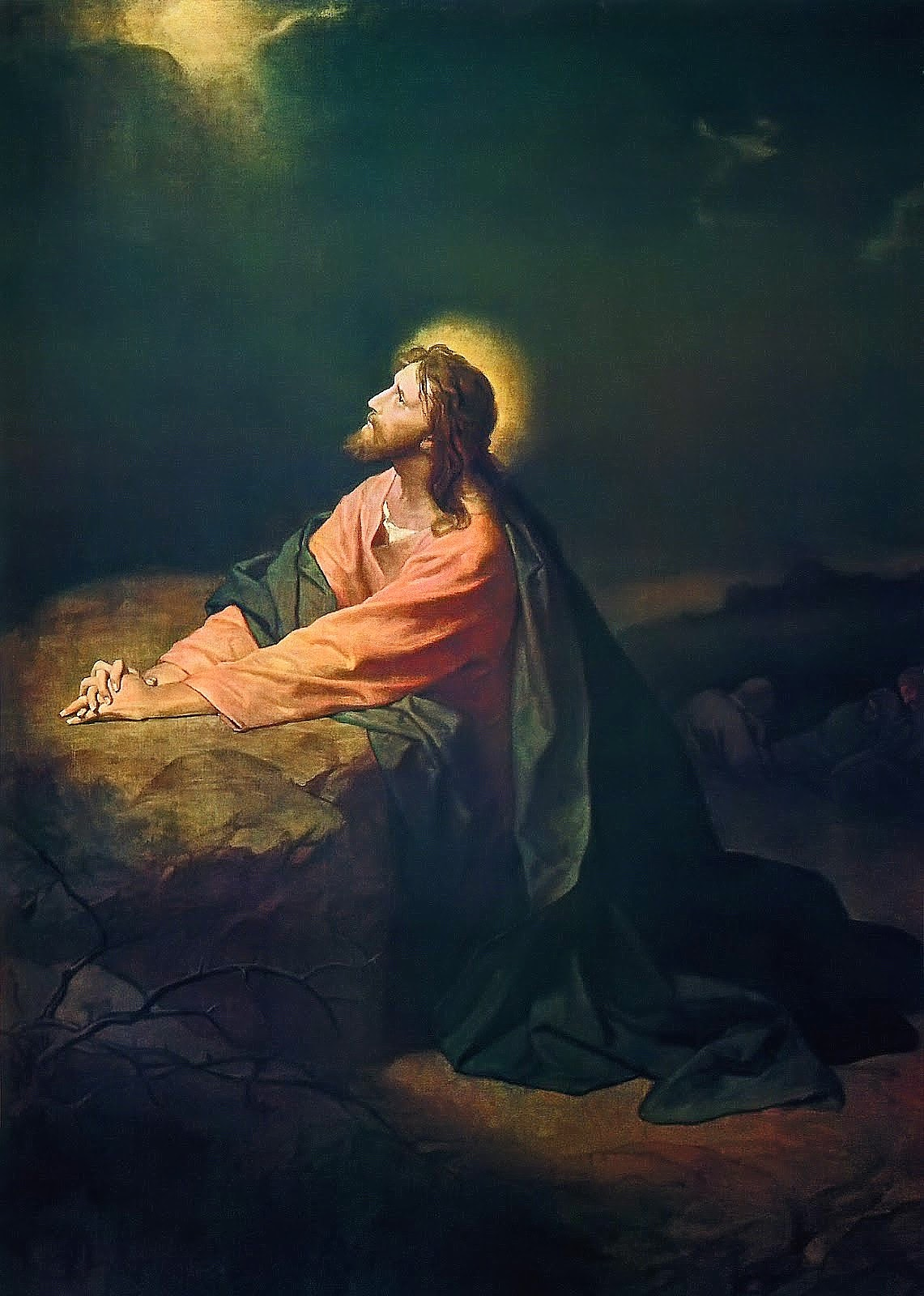
Christ in Gethsemane (1890)

Four of the most famous works of Hofmann are in the possession of the Riverside Church in New York: Christ and the Rich Young Ruler, Christ in Gethsemane, Christ in the Temple and Christ's Image. According to information of the Riverside Church, the painting Christ in Gethsemane is without much doubt one of the most copied paintings in the world.

The religious body of Hofmann’s work has gained in importance in the past years. One of the reasons for the increasing popularity of his artwork is the publication of his paintings and pencil drawings depicting the life of Jesus Christ in The Second Coming of Christ, the interpretation of the Gospels by Paramahansa Yogananda, the founder of Self Realization Fellowship, responsible for bringing the teachings of Kriya Yoga to the West.

Heinrich Hofmann was one of the pre-eminent painters of his time. The Sunday Strand – at that time a very popular British magazine– describes him as the most influential contemporary German painter. Hofmann’s style of painting was unique in its own way but at the same time he based his work on the traditional art of old German, Dutch and Italian masters. While in Rome he also came in touch with the Nazarenes – especially through the influence of Cornelius – but throughout his life he remained faithful to the great examples of the Renaissance. Religious paintings take the center stage in Hofmann’s work; but he also created numerous portraits and pictures that depict mythological and historical topics.

== Selected works ==
Three of his paintings were purchased by John D. Rockefeller Jr.: the 1882 studio copy of Christ in the Temple (1881), Christ and the Young Rich Man (1889), and Christ in Gethsemane (1890). These now are displayed at the Riverside Church in New York City.

- Scene from the Life of Alboin, King of the Langobards, 1845
- Heinrich von Gagern, 1848, first portrait, in the possession of the Gagern family
- Heinrich von Gagern, 1848, second portrait, Stadtmuseum Stettin
- Justus von Liebig, portrait around 1849, in the possession of the Queen of United Kingdom
- Peter von Cornelius, portrait around 1850, Darmstadt, Institut Mathildenhöhe
- Self-portrait, Institut Mathildenhöhe, Darmstadt
- The Sculptor Ernst Hähnel, Gemäldegalerie Neue Meister, Dresden
- Burial of Christ, 1854, owner unknown
- The Arrest of Christ, 1858, Hessisches Landesmuseum, Darmstadt
- St. Mary with Christ Child and Apostles, 1860, altarpiece for church in Obermörlen (Hesse)
- Resurrected Christ, 1867, altarpiece for church in Vaeggerlose, Denmark
- The Adulteress Before Christ, 1868, Gemäldegalerie Neue Meister, Dresden
- Drawings for the Brockhaus Shakespeare-Galerie, 1870
- Christ Preaching at the Sea of Galilee, 1875, first Nationalgalerie Berlin, then loan to the church administration in Kassel (Hesse), destroyed in the Second World War
- Engagement of Prince Albrecht von Wettin with Zedena von Böhmen, 1878, mural painting, Albrechtsburg, Meißen
- Apotheosis of the Heroes of the Greek Drama, 1876, large ceiling painting in the Royal Theater, Dresden
- Jesus in the Tempel (original), 1881, Gemäldegalerie Neue Meister, Dresden
- Jesus in the Tempel (copy made in Hofmann’s studio: partly done under his supervision, partly by himself), 1882, Riverside Church, New York
- Jesus in the Tempel, 1884, Kunsthalle Hamburg
- Remember Me, 1885, portfolio with drawings depicting the life of Jesus
- Come Unto Me, 1887, portfolio with drawings depicting the life of Jesus
- Christ with Mary and Martha, 1888, Self-Realization Fellowship, Los Angeles
- Christ and the Rich Young Ruler, 1889, Riverside Church, New York
- Christ in Gethsemane, 1890, Riverside Church, New York
- Peace Unto You, 1891, portfolio with drawings depicting the life of Jesus
- Christ's Image, 1894, Riverside Church, New York

== Bibliographical references ==
- NDB (Neue Deutsche Biographie) Vol. 9, p. 458
- Thieme/Becker Vol. 17, 1924
- Saur Allgemeines Künstlerlexikon, bibliographical index A-Z 1999-2000, Vol. 5, p. 24
- Friedrich v. Boetticher, Malerwerke des 19. Jahrhunderts, Dresden, 1895
- Müller, Rosemarie, Heinrich Hofmann, Painter of Christ, Self-Realization Magazine, Winter 2004
- Letters, diaries, records from the estate of Heinrich Hofmann, Hessisches Staatsarchiv (Hessian State Archives), Darmstadt
- Hessisches Landesmuseum Darmstadt, Barbara Bott, Gemälde Hessischer Maler des 19. Jahrhunderts im Hessischen Landesmuseum Darmstadt, Bestandskatalog (Paintings of Hessian Painters of the nineteenth century in the Hessian County Museum, Darmstadt, Catalog)

== See also ==
- Warner Sallman
