= An Essay on Censorship =

1989 essay by Anthony Burgess

An Essay on Censorship is a lengthy letter, in verse, by Anthony Burgess addressed to his fellow novelist Salman Rushdie. Published in the wake of the 1989 Iranian fatwa against Rushdie and the Bradford book-burnings that followed, Burgess's letter has been compared to the Essay on Man of Alexander Pope.
