= Enderby Outside =

1968 novel by Anthony Burgess

- Cover of First edition
- Author: Anthony Burgess
- Language: English
- Series: Enderby
- Genre: Comic novel
- Publisher: William Heinemann
- Publication date: May 1968
- Publication place: United Kingdom
- Media type: Print (Hardcover)
- Pages: 243 pp (Hardcover edition)
- ISBN: 0-434-09808-6 (hardcover edition)
- Preceded by: Inside Mr. Enderby
- Followed by: The Clockwork Testament, or Enderby's End

Enderby Outside, first published in 1968 in London by William Heinemann, is the second volume in the Enderby series of comic novels by Anthony Burgess. The series began with the publication in 1963 of Inside Mr. Enderby, continued in 1968 with Enderby Outside and 1974 with The Clockwork Testament, or Enderby's End, and concluded after a ten-year break in 1984 with Enderby's Dark Lady, or No End to Enderby.

== Plot summary ==
After a suicide attempt at the very end of Inside Mr. Enderby, the second novel opens with the protagonist under psychiatric care and working as a bartender at a large London hotel. Under the name of 'Hogg' (his stepmother's maiden name, we learn), he is persuaded to renounce the creation of poetry as an adolescent preoccupation and to pursue useful work.

Hogg-Enderby, bereft of his stock of capital and now divorced, is forced to earn his keep and finds that the poetic muse has left him. He also finds that his work has been plagiarised, again, by a certain rock singer named Yod Crewsey - whose band, the Crewsey Fixers, are managed and groomed by his former wife.

After being implicated in the public murder of Crewsey during a banquet at the hotel, Enderby-Hogg goes on the run to Morocco - to the bar of a rival poet named Rawcliffe. Assuming control and ownership of Rawcliffe's property upon his death, and the death of his 'Hogg' persona, Enderby realises that his muse is returning.
