= Moses: A Narrative =

1976 narrative poem by Anthony Burgess

First US edition (publ. Stonehill)

Moses is a 1976 narrative poem by Anthony Burgess of 200-plus pages in length, part of his religious or Biblical trilogy, the other components of the trilogy being The Kingdom of the Wicked and Man of Nazareth.

It was published shortly after he wrote the screenplay for Moses the Lawgiver, Gianfranco De Bosio's 1975 movie.
