= Homage to Qwert Yuiop =

1986 essay collection by Anthony Burgess

First edition (publ. Hutchinson)

Homage to Qwert Yuiop (1986) — published in the United States as But Do Blondes Prefer Gentlemen? — is a collection of essays and reviews by Anthony Burgess, first published in The Observer, The New York Times and The Times Literary Supplement. The title is a reference to the top row of letters on a standard QWERTY keyboard.

The contents of the book are arranged loosely by subject, covering "travel, language, film, music and, overwhelmingly, literature." Much of the book deals with the written word, including linguistic reviews of dictionaries, phrase books, and books of quotations. Burgess was widely known as a polyglot, and frequently includes linguistic anecdotes (etymology and so forth), from English, Russian, Greek, Latin and Malay.

Burgess also writes on the movie business, including a celebration of Sophia Loren and accounts of his own experiences as a scriptwriter. There are reviews of biographies (of writers such as H. G. Wells, Robert Graves and Dashiell Hammett), fiction and autobiographies, as well as an interview with Graham Greene.

The book displays the tremendous amount of knowledge Burgess had accumulated by the age of 66, especially concerning geography, travel, cultures, languages and literature.

- (1986) ISBN 0-349-10440-9
