= The Devil's Mode =

1989 collection of short stories by Anthony Burgess

- First edition cover
- Author: Anthony Burgess
- Publisher: Hutchinson
- Publication date: 1989

The Devil's Mode (1989) is the only collection of short stories by the English author Anthony Burgess.

The stories included are varied in their settings and themes and display Burgess's characteristic wide range, while touching on such themes as the private life of Shakespeare, which he speculated on in his novel Nothing Like the Sun, and the lives of British expatriates in the Far East, explored by Burgess in his Malayan trilogy.

== Contents ==
- A Meeting in Valladolid – Shakespeare, on tour in Spain, encounters Cervantes.
- The Most Beautified – A surreal, metaphysical examination of beauty.
- The Cavalier of The Rose – A literary adaptation of the opera libretto Der Rosenkavalier by Hugo von Hofmannsthal.
- 1889 and The Devil's Mode – Claude Debussy, while visiting the Rossettis in London, meets Mallarmé, whose Afternoon of a Faun he sets to music.
- Wine of The Country – A tale of infidelity and sexual licence concerning a British couple in Brunei.
- Snow – A loosely autobiographical story of a British man in Malaya during the dying days of the British Empire, intended as a counterpoint to W. Somerset Maugham's "Rain".
- The Endless Voyager – An updated The Flying Dutchman, transferred to the airline era.
- Hun – The longest of the stories, a novella about Attila the Hun as he prepares to devastate the Roman Empire.
- Murder to Music – A pastiche of a Sherlock Holmes story sees the great sleuth solve a symphonic crime.

== Reception ==
The collection received mixed to negative reviews. Helen Benedict, writing for the New York Times, writing "his first collection of short stories reads as if he had dashed them off in his bathtub". Benedict wrote positively about A Meeting in Valladolid, 1889 and the Devil's Mode, and Hun, but found the other stories to be hollow. Kirkus Reviews described the collection as "scraps from the master's table". A reviewer for Library Journal wrote "In this moderately diverting collection, mild irony and witty erudition fail to disguise a want of feeling."
