= Inside Mr Enderby =

1963 novel by Anthony Burgess

Inside Mr. Enderby
- First edition cover
- Author: Anthony Burgess (as Joseph Kell)
- Language: English
- Series: Enderby
- Genre: Comic novel
- Publisher: William Heinemann
- Publication date: 1963
- Publication place: United Kingdom
- Media type: Print (Hardcover)
- Pages: 253 (Hardcover edition)
- ISBN: 0-434-38700-2 (later hardcover edition)
- OCLC: 3074084
- Dewey Decimal: 823/.9/14
- LC Class: PZ4.B953 In 1975 PR6052.U638
- Followed by: Enderby Outside

Inside Mr Enderby is the first volume of the Enderby series, a quartet of comic novels by the British author Anthony Burgess.

The book was first published in 1963 in London by William Heinemann under the pseudonym Joseph Kell. The series began with the publication in 1963 of Inside Mr. Enderby, continued in 1968 with Enderby Outside and 1974 with The Clockwork Testament, or Enderby's End, and concluded after a ten-year break in 1984 with Enderby's Dark Lady, or No End to Enderby. Some of the poems included in the novel were later published in the collection Revolutionary Sonnets and Other Poems.

== Plot summary ==
The story opens on a note of pure fantasy, showing school children from the future taking a field trip through time to see the dyspeptic poet Francis Xavier Enderby while he is asleep. Enderby, a lapsed Catholic in his mid-40s, lives alone in Brighton as a "professional" poet - his income being interest from investments left to him by his stepmother.

Enderby composes his poems while he sits on the toilet. His bathtub, which serves as a filing cabinet, is almost full of the mingled paper and food scraps that represent his efforts. Although he is recognised as a minor poet with several published works (and is even awarded a small prize, the Goodby Gold Medal, which he refuses), he has yet to be anthologised.

He is persuaded to leave his lonely but poetically fruitful bachelor life by Vesta Bainbridge, the editor of a woman's magazine, after he accidentally sends her a love poem instead of a complaint about a recipe in her magazine. The marriage, which soon ends, costs Enderby dearly, alienating him from his muse and depriving him of his financial independence.

Months pass, and Enderby is able to write only one more poem. After spending what remains of his capital, he attempts suicide with an overdose of aspirin, experiencing visions of his stepmother as he nears death. His cries of horror bring help, and he regains consciousness in a mental institution, where the doctors persuade him to renounce his old, "immature" poetry-writing self. Rechristened "Piggy Hogg", he looks forward contentedly to a new career as a bartender.

== Criticism ==
1984 McGraw-Hill edition

Anthony Burgess wrote a review of Joseph Kell's book for the Yorkshire Post. "[W]hen the editor sent him the author's novel Burgess thought it was a practical joke, but it wasn't." When the paper found out that Kell was one of Burgess's pen names, Burgess was removed from his reviewing duties.

Anatole Broyard of The New York Times wrote:

"Mr. Burgess is so fond of Enderby — by far his best creation — that he has devoted four books to him: Inside Mr. Enderby and Enderby Outside, which were published in 1968, The Clockwork Testament in 1975, and now, Enderby's Dark Lady."

Harold Bloom has nominated the novel as one of his candidates for "the most undervalued English novel of our era".

== Reviews ==
- Broyard, Anatole (14 April 1984). "Books of The Times". The New York Times.

== Release details ==
- 1963, UK, William Heinemann (ISBN B0000CLQ13), Pub Date ? ? 1970, Hardback
- 1984, US, Mcgraw-Hill (ISBN 0-07-008973-6), Pub Date April ? 1984, Hardback
- 1984, US, Mcgraw-Hill (ISBN 0-07-008970-1), Pub Date ? ? 1984, Paperback
- 1996, US, Carroll & Graf Publishers (ISBN 0-7867-0248-6), Pub Date January ? 1996, Hardback (complete Enderby series)

== Sources, references, external links, quotations ==
- Petri Liukkonen. "Anthony Burgess". Books and Writers.
- Broyard, Anatole (14 April 1984). "Books of The Times". The New York Times.
- Biography
