= One Man's Chorus: The Uncollected Writings =

1998 essays and pieces of journalism written by Anthony Burgess

One Man's Chorus
- Author: Anthony Burgess
- Language: English
- Genre: Journalism
- Publisher: Carroll & Graf
- Publication date: Dec 1998
- Publication place: Various
- Media type: Print (Hardback and Paperback)
- Pages: 380 p.
- ISBN: 0-7867-0568-X (hardback), ISBN 0-7867-0699-6 (paperback)
- OCLC: 40283602
- Dewey Decimal: 823/.914 21
- LC Class: PR6052.U638 A6 1998

One Man's Chorus gathers various essays and pieces of journalism written by Anthony Burgess throughout the later years of his life. It was published posthumously in 1998. The book is edited and introduced by Ben Forkner.

While several of the essays may be considered autobiographical, others contain Burgess's thoughts on a wide variety of subjects including geography, culture, linguistics, and novelists.

== Contents ==
- Introduction (by Ben Forkner)
- Genius Loci

- The Ball Is Free to Roll
- Francophonia
- Going North
- Understanding the French
- Never Again Again
- Something About Malaysia
- The Brigg
- Winterreise
- The Art of Liking Rome
- France and Myself
- Farewell (& Hello Again) Manchester
- Life (of a Sort) in Venice
- Manchester as Was

- In Our Time (and Other Reflections)

- Cut Off
- The Royals
- England in Europe
- After This Our Exile
- Thoughts on Time
- The Jew and the Joke
- The British Temper
- The World Doesn't Like Gipsies
- What Makes Comedy Comic?
- Thoughts on the Thatcher Decade
- Dirty Pictures
- God and God's Voices

- Ars Poetica

- Success
- The Celtic Sacrifice
- Shaw as Musician
- Ring
- The Literature of the British from 1900 to 1982
- All About Alice
- Flann O'Brien A Prefatory Word
- Artist's Life
- Elgar non è volgare
- The Gaudiness of Gaudí
- Orson Welles: The Artist as Bricoleur
- A Clockwork Orange Resucked
- The Brotherhood
- Why Were the Revolutionaries Reactionary?
- Shakespeare the Poet
- The Oriental Diseases of Fiction
- Playing Hamlet with Hamlet
- Graham Greene: A Reminiscence
- Craft and Crucifixion—the Writing of Fiction
- Strega in Do Maggiore
- First Novel

- Anniversaries and Celebrations

- Joyce as Centenarian
- Great Scott?
- Rudyard Kipling and the White Man's Burden
- Domesday
- Lorenzo
- Quiet Pioneer
- Good Gluck
- Unravelling Ravel
- God Struck with His Wind
- Celebrating T. S. Eliot, Parts I and II
- Lord Olivier
- Gerard Manley Hopkins 1844–1889
- Two Hundred Years of the Bounty
- Our Eternal Holmes
- The Cold Eye of Yeats
- Father of the OED
- Chaplin on Stage
- Evelyn Waugh: A Revaluation
- James Joyce: Fifty Years After
- Tolkien: A Centenary
- Virginia Woolf Mortua 1941
- Marilyn
