= Man of Nazareth =

1979 historical novel by Anthony Burgess

- First edition
- Author: Anthony Burgess
- Language: English
- Genre: Historical novel
- Publisher: McGraw-Hill
- Publication date: 1979
- Publication place: United States
- Media type: Print (Hardback and Paperback)
- ISBN: 0-07-008962-0
- OCLC: 4515476
- Dewey Decimal: 823/.9/14
- LC Class: PZ4.B953 Man 1979 PR6052.U638
- Followed by: The Kingdom of the Wicked

Man of Nazareth is a 1979 historical novel by Anthony Burgess based on his screenplay for Franco Zeffirelli's television miniseries Jesus of Nazareth (1977). It is the second in a trilogy of Burgess books with biblical themes, the others being Moses (1976) and The Kingdom of the Wicked (1985).

== Plot introduction ==
Man of Nazareth is a fictionalized historic account recalling the story of Jesus from his birth to his death. Burgess uses a Greek merchant recently returned from Jerusalem following the crucifixion as the narrator, a man recounting the stories he heard about Jesus while conducting his business there.

== Release details ==
- 1979, United States, McGraw-Hill ISBN 0-07-008962-0, Pub date November 1979, Hardback

== Sources, references, external links, quotations ==
"'Love and Do as You Please'". The New York Review of Books. 26. NYR Books …. 16 August 1979.
