= Shakespeare (book) =

1970 book by Anthony Burgess

- First UK edition
- Author: Anthony Burgess
- Language: English
- Subject: William Shakespeare
- Genre: Non-fiction
- Publication date: 1970

Shakespeare, a biographical and critical study of William Shakespeare by Anthony Burgess, was published in 1970. The book talks about Shakespear's life, home, his work and plays, friends and many more.The book is decorated with a lot of beautiful pictures of Shakespeare, Queen Elizabeth first, and also with pictures of Shakespeare's home. In the book the writer also wrote about Shakespeare's plays and dramas and explained them, for example King Lear that is a very known book of Shakespeare. The writer sees Will as a sensitive, sensual and shrewd man from the provinces, and is important for England's history.

== Reception ==
Judah Waten, writing in The Age, thought that Burgess offered "and excellent impressionistic survey of the Elizabethan age." Charles A. Brady, for The Buffalo News, found the work made the age "[come] alive again".
