= Democracia (Tangier) =

Spanish-language newspaper in Morocco

- Type: Weekly
- Political alignment: Republican
- Language: Spanish language
- Headquarters: Petit Socco, Tangier

Democracia (English: Democracy) was a Spanish language Republican weekly newspaper published from Tangier, Morocco. The office of Democracia was located at Petit Socco.

On 27 December 1936 the offices of Democracia was attacked by a large group of Italian sailors, who vandalised the building and threatened to kill the editor. Returning from the attack, they sang the fascist hymn Giovinezza. The attack was interpreted at the time as indicative of the Italian support for Francisco Franco's revolt against the government in Madrid.
