= Rencontre au Sommet =

- First edition, 1998.
- Author: Anthony Burgess and Isaac Bashevis Singer
- Translator: Lili Sztajn
- ISBN: 2842053338

Rencontre au Sommet. Dialogue between Anthony Burgess and Isaac Bashevis Singer is an 86-page book containing the complete transcripts of conversations between Anthony Burgess and Isaac Bashevis Singer when they met for a Swedish television documentary in 1985.

The transcripts were translated into French by Lili Sztajn and published by Mille Et Une Nuits in 1998 (Series: La petite collection, 205).

The novelists discussed their respective religious experiences — Catholicism and Judaism — and their childhoods. They talked about God, the nature of evil, and the issue of free will in relation to Burgess's novel A Clockwork Orange. There was also a discussion of the Yiddish language in which both had a strong interest.
