= Head of Christ =

1940 painting by Warner Sallman

- Artist: Warner Sallman
- Year: 1940
- Location: Warner Sallman Collection, Anderson University; Anderson, Indiana

The Head of Christ, also called the Sallman Head, is a 1940 portrait painting of Jesus by Warner Sallman (1892–1968). As an extraordinarily successful work of Christian popular devotional art, it had been reproduced over half a billion times worldwide by the end of the 20th century. Enlarged copies of the work have been made for churches, and small pocket or wallet-sized prayer cards bearing the image have been mass-produced for private devotional use. The painting is said to have "become the basis for [the] visualization of Jesus" for "hundreds of millions" of people.

== Origins ==
The Head of Christ originated as a charcoal sketch entitled The Son of Man done in 1924 and sold to be the cover of the Covenant Companion, the denominational magazine for the Evangelical Covenant Church. Sallman completed several variations of the painting over the years, and the first oil version dates from 1935 for the fiftieth anniversary celebration of the Evangelical Covenant Church. In 1940, he was asked to reproduce that painting by the students of North Park Theological Seminary. This reproduction was seen by representatives of the Gospel Trumpet Company, the publishing arm of the Church of God (Anderson), who created a new company called Kriebel and Bates to market Sallman's work. For the next thirty years, Kriebel and Bates marketed over 100 Warner Sallman works. When Kriebel and Bates dissolved, the copyrights to these works were acquired by Warner Press.

The Baptist Bookstore initially popularized the painting, distributing various sized lithographic images for sale throughout the southern United States. The Salvation Army and the YMCA, as members of the USO, handed out pocket-sized versions of the painting to American servicemen heading overseas during World War II. After the war, groups in Oklahoma and Indiana conducted campaigns to distribute the image into private and public spaces. One Lutheran organizer in Illinois "said that there ought to be 'card-carrying Christians' to counter the effect of 'card-carrying Communists."

== Features ==
Many Lutheran and Roman Catholic Christians have praised the painting for the hidden host on the forehead of The Head of Christ, and a chalice on his temple, both pointing to the Holy Eucharist. The Head of Christ became popular among evangelical Christians as well, as they believed the portrait to emphasize the "salvific power of the life, death and resurrection of Jesus". David Morgan, a professor of religion at Duke University, states that "for many Christians during the Cold War, Sallman's portrait did symbolize a virile, manly Christ, while for others it embodied a more intimate and nurturing Jesus, a personal saviour for modern times."

== Alleged miracles ==
Warner Sallman believed that his initial sketch of The Head of Christ was the result of a "miraculous vision that he received late one night", stating that "the answer came at 2 A.M., January 1924" as "a vision in response to my prayer to God in a despairing situation."

The Head of Christ is also venerated in the Coptic Orthodox Church, following a 1991 report in which twelve-year-old Isaac Ayoub of Houston, Texas, who was diagnosed with leukemia, saw the eyes of Jesus in the painting shedding tears; Fr. Ishaq Soliman of St. Mark's Coptic Church in Houston, on the same day, "testified to the miracles" and on the next day, "Dr. Atef Rizkalla, the family physician, examined the youth and certified that there were no traces of leukemia". With episcopal approval from Bishop Tadros of Port Said and Bishop Yuhanna of Cairo, "Sallman's Head of Christ was exhibited in the Coptic Church", with "more than fifty thousand people" visiting the church to see it.

In addition, several religious magazines have explained the "power of Sallman's picture" by documenting occurrences such as headhunters letting go of a businessman and fleeing after seeing a copy of the image on his person, a "thief who aborted his misdeed when he saw the Head of Christ on a living room wall", and deathbed conversions of non-believers to Christianity.

== Appearances ==
The chancel of El Buen Samaritano United Methodist Church features a large copy of Sallman's Head of Christ rather than a traditional altar cross. St. Francis de Sales Seminary, a Roman Catholic institution in Oklahoma City, "requested and received a gigantic Head of Christ to display on campus". According to David Morgan, the Head of Christ "is still found in both Protestant and Catholic churches, enjoys fond use among Mormons, Latinos, Native Americans, and African Americans, and hangs in Christian homes in Africa, Latin America, Asia, and Eastern Europe".

The Head of Christ has appeared in scenes of several films, such as Children of the Corn (1984), Jungle Fever (1991) and Silver Linings Playbook (2012).

== See also ==
- Grace (photograph)
- The Last Supper (Leonardo da Vinci)
