= The Clockwork Testament, or Enderby's End =

Novella by Anthony Burgess

The Clockwork Testament
- Author: Anthony Burgess
- Original title: The Clockwork Testament; or, Enderby's End
- Language: English
- Series: Enderby tetralogy
- Genre: Mock epic; satire
- Publisher: Hart-Davis, MacGibbon
- Publication date: 1974
- Publication place: United Kingdom
- Media type: Print
- Preceded by: Enderby Outside
- Followed by: Enderby's Dark Lady

The Clockwork Testament is a novella by the British author Anthony Burgess. It is the third of Burgess' four Enderby novels and was first published in 1974 by Hart-Davis, MacGibbon Publishers. It is usually subtitled Enderby's End, as it was originally intended to be the last book in the Enderby series. However, a further sequel, Enderby's Dark Lady, followed in 1984.

== Plot summary ==
Enderby is a dyspeptic British poet, 56 years old, and The Clockwork Testament is an account of his last day alive. The day in question is a cold one in February. He spends it in New York City, where for the past several months he's been working as a visiting professor of English literature and composing a long poem about St Augustine and Pelagius.

Enderby's present situation arose from a chance encounter with an American film producer in Tangiers, where he owns a bar. Publican Enderby served the man a Scotch and pitched him an idea for a new film—an adaptation of Gerard Manley Hopkins's poetic masterpiece "The Wreck of the Deutschland". The producer, intrigued, asked for a script, which Enderby duly composed. The eventual film bears little resemblance to this script or to Hopkins's poem; however, his name is prominently credited, and the film, and Enderby, are now famous.

This public recognition has led to an invitation to teach English at the University of Manhattan for a year. Also, since the film has controversial elements—including a rape scene with Nazis and nuns—the reclusive, little-read poet has been receiving phone calls from citizens criticizing "his" film. These callers (and other critics) have not read the original poem and do not know it exists.

Enderby suffers three heart attacks over the course of the day, and succumbs to a fourth some time after midnight. Between attacks, he goes about his business: he happily works on his Pelagian poem; eats dyspeptic American food and smokes White Owl cigars; refuses an offer of sex from a female poetry student who wants him to give her an A; struggles through two lectures; appears on a smarmy talk show; and draws a sword he carries hidden in his cane to defend a middle-aged housewife from a gang of thugs on the subway.

Everywhere—even on the subway—he encounters incomprehension and, usually, disapproval. When he finally gets home, however, a woman he's never seen before drops by and pulls a gun on him; she has come to tell him she's read and re-read all his poetry, and is now going to murder him for writing it. First, however, she orders him to strip naked and urinate all over his collected works. Enderby strips, but since he has an erection he cannot obey the rest of her command. The scene ends, apparently, in a sexual encounter. Enderby dies later that night.

== Themes ==
A Clockwork Testament is laced with Burgess's usual mordant wit, deft literary allusions, and virtuosic wordplay. The world of the book takes its hue from Enderby's brilliant but ever-irritable outsider's psyche. In some ways, the novel echoes Joyce's Ulysses; it covers one day only, casts an unheroic man in the role of hero, and explores that man's physical and mental processes in intimate detail. In place of The Odyssey, Burgess incorporates extended references to St Augustine and Pelagius, and also to Gerard Manley Hopkins, author of a phrase Enderby makes peculiarly his own: "I am gall, I am heartburn."

The book blends social satire with self-mockery. In a classroom scene, for example, Enderby is unable to remember his planned lecture on minor Elizabethan dramatists and so on the spur of the moment invents a playwright called 'Gervase Whitelady'. He discourses learnedly on this personage for some time, helped on by a student who begins as a know-it-all but ends as a collaborator, earnestly prompting him with the details of Whitelady's life. Enderby abruptly concludes the lecture by dismissing his imaginary playwright as a failure— at which point he recognises his creation as a mirror image of himself. Later, at his poetry-writing class, Enderby finds little to admire in his students' undisciplined effusions and tries to impress on them that poetry arises from craftsmanlike effort, not emotional self-indulgence. The students, however, just look at him pityingly and ask him when he plans to leave.

As the title suggests, The Clockwork Testament also gives the author a chance to explore his own bemusement over Stanley Kubrick's film adaptation of A Clockwork Orange: Burgess came to hate the film that made him famous. This autobiographical element is most apparent in the talk show scene, where Enderby's fellow guests (an actress and a psychologist) attack the poet for his involvement in a film version of "The Wreck of the Deutschland", which has been accused of inspiring violence against nuns. Enderby, forced to defend a movie that he considers a punishment to Hopkins, reiterates the central themes of A Clockwork Orange: the human need to choose freely between good and evil, and the daemonic, joyous nature of man's creative inner self. At this point, he quotes directly from the novel. Burgess faced similar criticism over Kubrick's version of A Clockwork Orange; he, too, for example, found himself being blamed for the rape of a nun because the movie allegedly inspired it.

== Sources ==
- Broyard, Anatole. Books of the Times (review, A Clockwork Testament). The New York Times, 1 February 1975 (Full Text)
- Burgess, Anthony. "The Ecstasy of Gerard Manley Hopkins". The New York Times, 27 August 1989 (Full Text)
