= The Kingdom of the Wicked =

1985 historical novel by Anthony Burgess

- First edition
- Author: Anthony Burgess
- Language: English
- Genre: Historical novel
- Publisher: Hutchinson & Co
- Publication date: 1 September 1985
- Publication place: United Kingdom
- Media type: Print (Hardback & Paperback)
- Pages: 379 pp
- ISBN: 0-87795-753-3
- OCLC: 12051789
- Dewey Decimal: 823/.914 19
- LC Class: PR6052.U638 K5 1985

The Kingdom of the Wicked is a 1985 historical novel by Anthony Burgess.

Like two of his earlier works, the long narrative poem Moses and the novel Man of Nazareth (together these books make up what has been referred to as his biblical or religious trilogy), Burgess wrote The Kingdom of the Wicked in part as preparation for a screenplay; in this case for the television series A.D.

== Plot summary ==
The story of the birth of Christianity and its interaction with the Roman Empire is told largely chronologically by a narrator slowly succumbing to disease during the reign of Domitian.

The story starts where Man of Nazareth ended, immediately after the crucifixion of Jesus, and covers the work of the apostles, in particular Paul (who himself was not one of the original twelve apostles), the development of Christianity as an Abrahamic religion separate from Judaism, the Great Fire of Rome, the persecution of Christians, the destruction of the Second Temple, and the destruction of Pompeii.
