= Enderby's Dark Lady, or No End to Enderby =

Novel by Anthony Burgess

Enderby's Dark Lady
- First edition
- Author: Anthony Burgess
- Language: English
- Series: Enderby tetralogy
- Genre: Mock epic; satire
- Publisher: Hutchinson
- Publication date: 1984
- Publication place: United Kingdom
- Media type: Print
- Preceded by: The Clockwork Testament, or Enderby's End

Enderby's Dark Lady, or, No End to Enderby is a 1984 novel by Anthony Burgess, the final volume in the Enderby series. It was first published in the United Kingdom by Hutchinson.

The protagonist was killed off in the third book, The Clockwork Testament, or Enderby's End (1974), but Burgess later considered this a mistake and brought the character back for one more book.

== Summary ==
The ageing poet has been hired to write the libretto for a musical about William Shakespeare and relocates to the fictional Indiana town of Terrebasse. He must work with collaborators who seem more interested in crude show-biz entertainment than Enderby's intricately rhymed Elizabethan-style verses, and with the show's backer, the ostentatious local matron Mrs Schoenbaum. The co-star, in the Dark Lady role, is the luscious black pop-diva April Elgar. Enderby, consumed with lust, is soon tailoring the show to her non-Elizabethan talents. April is a well-educated daughter of a Carolinian family and is not unresponsive to Enderby's infatuation. She invites Enderby to her home for Christmas and has him pose as a clergyman, preaching an incoherent sermon to a Baptist congregation. Eventually, the opening night of Actor on his Ass, as the show is now titled, arrives, and Enderby is forced to take over the role of Shakespeare.

Although Anatole Broyard of The New York Times considered the book funny and clever, he concluded that it was "not as good as the previous three books."
