= Warner Sallman =

American painter

- Born: Warner Elias Sallman; April 30, 1892; Chicago, Illinois, U.S.
- Died: May 25, 1968 (aged 76); Chicago, Illinois, U.S.
- Education: School of the Art Institute of Chicago
- Known for: Painting, illustration
- Notable work: Head of Christ
- Patrons: Walter Marshall Cluett

Warner Elias Sallman (April 30, 1892 – May 25, 1968) was an American painter from Chicago best known for his works of Christian religious imagery. He studied at the Carlson School of Art in Minneapolis and briefly at the Chicago Art Institute. He also worked in commercial advertising, as well as in freelance illustration. He is most associated with his portrait of Jesus, Head of Christ, of which more than 500 million copies have been sold. In 1994, The New York Times wrote that he was likely to be voted the "best-known artist of the century".

== Biography ==
Warner Elias Sallman was born on April 30, 1892 and was the eldest of three children born to Elias Sallman and Christiane (Larson) Sallman who were immigrants from Finland and Sweden. He was trained in art by apprenticing in local studios while attending the Chicago Art Institute at night. There he became a protégé of Walter Marshall Cluett, a newspaper illustrator noted for his work during the Spanish-American War. He was initially affiliated with local studios until he opened his own. In 1916, he married Ruth Anderson, whom he met while both were singing in the church choir.

Sallman was a lifelong member of the Swedish Evangelical Mission Covenant of America (now the Evangelical Covenant Church), an Evangelical Protestant denomination.

Warner died on May 25, 1968, at the age of 76.

== Paintings ==
Sallman is best known for his Head of Christ, which was painted in 1940. This painting has been widely reproduced and is one of the most recognized images of Jesus. Over 500 million copies have been sold, and are used in churches of several Christian denominations, as well as for private devotional use.

Sallman is also well known for his rendition of the popular image Christ at Heart's Door. Other popular images produced from 1942 to 1950 include Christ in Gethsemane, The Lord is My Shepherd, and Christ Our Pilot.

A vast collection of his original works, including Head of Christ, is owned by Anderson University. Warner Press, the publishing arm of the Church of God in Anderson, Indiana, holds the copyright and distribution rights to all Warner Sallman images.

The Ascension of Christ (1952) in Iron Mountain, Michigan. Photo by Derrick Hautamaki.

Sallman also created a lesser-known work called The Ascension of Christ. This painting, which is owned by and located at the First Covenant Church in Iron Mountain, Michigan, measures 20 feet wide by 23 feet high. The painting was done in one of the large meeting rooms on the campus of North Park College (now University) in Chicago and shipped in two large rolls to Iron Mountain, where it was installed by the men of the church on the wall above the choir loft. Sallman came to Iron Mountain to put finishing touches on the painting and attend the dedication at First Covenant Church in May, 1952. It is believed to be the largest painting done by the artist.

Sallman named the eleven apostles in the painting (from left to right) James, the lesser; Philip; Matthew; Thaddeus; James, the elder, son of Zebedee; Thomas, the doubter; John, brother of James; Andrew, brother of Simon Peter; Simon Peter, now shepherd of the flock; Simon, the Zealot; Bartholomew. The full figure of Christ can be seen from any elevation when entering the church.

== Related reading ==
- Lundbom, Jack R (2015) Master Painter: Warner E. Sallman (Wipf and Stock; Eugene, Oregon) ISBN 978-1498223416
- Morgan, David (1996) Icons of American Protestantism: The Art of Warner Sallman (Yale University Press) ISBN 978-0300063424
- Peterson, Sylvia E and Warner Sallman Story of Sallman's The Lord's Supper (Kriebel & Bates/Prt by Warner Press. 1950)

== See also ==
- Heinrich Hofmann
