= The Cambridge Edition of the Letters and Works of D. H. Lawrence =

The Cambridge Edition of the Letters and Works of D. H. Lawrence is an ongoing project by Cambridge University Press to produce definitive editions of the writings of D. H. Lawrence. It is a major scholarly undertaking that strives to provide new versions of the texts as close as can be determined to what the author intended.

This ongoing project, started in 1979, will eventually encompass over 40 separate volumes, each complete with a high quality critical apparatus. As such, it represents the authoritative base text for academic comment, literary criticism, reference and research.

== Novels ==
- The White Peacock (1911), edited by Andrew Robertson, Cambridge University Press, 1983, ISBN 0-521-22267-2
- The Trespasser (1912), edited by Elizabeth Mansfield, Cambridge University Press, 1981, ISBN 0-521-22264-8
- Sons and Lovers (1913), edited by Helen Baron and Carl Baron, Cambridge University Press, 1992, ISBN 0-521-24276-2
- The Rainbow (1915), edited by Mark Kinkead-Weekes, Cambridge University Press, 1989, ISBN 0-521-00944-8
- Women in Love (1920), edited by David Farmer, Lindeth Vasey and John Worthen, Cambridge University Press, 1987, ISBN 0-521-23565-0
- The Lost Girl (1920), edited by John Worthen, Cambridge University Press, 1981, ISBN 0-521-22263-X
- Aaron's Rod (1922) edited by Mara Kalnins, Cambridge University Press, 1988,ISBN 0-521-25250-4
- Kangaroo (1923) edited by Bruce Steele, Cambridge University Press, 1994, ISBN 0-521-38455-9
- The Boy in the Bush (1924), edited by Paul Eggert, Cambridge University Press, 1990, ISBN 0-521-30704-X
- The Plumed Serpent (1926), edited by L. D. Clark, Cambridge University Press, 1987, ISBN 0-521-22262-1
- Lady Chatterley's Lover(1928), edited by Michael Squires, Cambridge University Press, 1993, ISBN 0-521-22266-4

== Short stories ==
- The Prussian Officer and other stories (1914), edited by John Worthen, Cambridge University Press, 1983, ISBN 0-521-24822-1
- The Vicar's Garden and Other Stories (1914), edited by N. H. Reeve, Cambridge University Press, 2014, ISBN 1-107-45751-3
- England, my England and other stories (1922), edited by Bruce Steele, Cambridge University Press, 1990, ISBN 0-521-35267-3
- The Ladybird, The Fox, The Captain's Doll (1923), edited by Dieter Mehl, Cambridge University Press, 1992, ISBN 0-521-35266-5
- St Mawr and other stories (1925), edited by Brian Finney, Cambridge University Press, 1983, ISBN 0-521-22265-6
- The Woman who Rode Away and other stories (1928) edited by Dieter Mehl and Christa Jansohn, Cambridge University Press, 1995, ISBN 0-521-22270-2
- The Virgin and the Gipsy and Other Stories (1930), edited by Michael Herbert, Bethan Jones, Lindeth Vasey, Cambridge University Press, 2006, ISBN 0-521-36607-0
- Love Among the Haystacks and other stories (1930), edited by John Worthen, Cambridge University Press, 1987, ISBN 0-521-26836-2)

== Poems ==
- The Poems, Two Volume Set, by D.H. Lawrence, edited by Christopher Pollnitz. Cambridge University Press, 2013. ISBN 978-0521294294 (hardcover).
- The Poems, Volume III: Uncollected Poems and Early Versions, by D.H. Lawrence, edited by Christopher Pollnitz. Cambridge University Press, 2018. ISBN 978-1-108-42686-2 (hardcover).

== Plays ==
- The Plays, edited by Hans-Wilhelm Schwarze and John Worthen, Cambridge University Press, 1999, ISBN 0-521-24277-0

== Non-fiction ==
- Study of Thomas Hardy and other essays (1914), edited by Bruce Steele, Cambridge University Press, 1985, ISBN 0-521-25252-0, Literary criticism and metaphysics
- Movements in European History (1921), edited by Philip Crumpton, Cambridge University Press, 1989, ISBN 0-521-26201-1
- Psychoanalysis and the Unconscious and Fantasia of the Unconscious (1921/1922), edited by Bruce Steele, Cambridge University Press, 2004 ISBN 0-521-32791-1
- Studies in Classic American Literature (1923), edited by Ezra Greenspan, Lindeth Vasey and John Worthen, Cambridge University Press, 2002, ISBN 0-521-55016-5
- Reflections on the Death of a Porcupine and other essays (1925), edited by Michael Herbert, Cambridge University Press, 1988, ISBN 0-521-26622-X
- Apocalypse and the Writings on Revelation (1931) edited by Mara Kalnins, Cambridge University Press, 1980, ISBN 0-521-22407-1
- Introductions and Reviews, edited by N. H. Reeve and John Worthen, Cambridge University Press, 2004, ISBN 0-521-83584-4
- Late Essays and Articles, edited by James T. Boulton, Cambridge University Press, 2004, ISBN 0-521-58431-0

== Travel books ==
- Mornings in Mexico and Other Essays (1927, 1922–1928), edited by Virginia Crosswhite Hyde, Cambridge University Press, 2009, ISBN 978-0-521-65292-6
- Twilight in Italy and Other Essays (1916), edited by Paul Eggert, Cambridge University Press, 1994, ISBN 0-521-26888-5
- Sea and Sardinia (1921), edited by Mara Kalnins, Cambridge University Press, 1997, ISBN 0-521-24275-4
- Sketches of Etruscan Places and other Italian essays (1932), edited by Simonetta de Filippis, Cambridge University Press, 1992, ISBN 0-521-25253-9

== Manuscripts and early drafts of published novels and other works ==
- Paul Morel (1911–12), edited by Helen Baron, Cambridge University Press, 2003, ISBN 0-521-56009-8
- The First Women in Love (1916–17) edited by John Worthen and Lindeth Vasey, Cambridge University Press, 1998, ISBN 0-521-37326-3
- Mr Noon (1920?) – Parts I and II, edited by Lindeth Vasey, Cambridge University Press, 1984, ISBN 0-521-25251-2
- The First and Second Lady Chatterley novels, edited by Dieter Mehl and Christa Jansohn, Cambridge University Press, 1999, ISBN 0-521-47116-8.
- Quetzalcoatl, edited by N. H. Reeve, Cambridge University Press, 2011, ISBN 1-107-00407-1.

== Letters ==
- The Letters of D. H. Lawrence, Volume I, September 1901 – May 1913, ed. James T. Boulton, Cambridge University Press, 1979, ISBN 0-521-22147-1
- The Letters of D. H. Lawrence, Volume II, June 1913 – October 1916, ed. George J. Zytaruk and James T. Boulton, Cambridge University Press, 1981, ISBN 0-521-23111-6
- The Letters of D. H. Lawrence, Volume III, October 1916 – June 1921, ed. James T. Boulton and Andrew Robertson, Cambridge University Press, 1984, ISBN 0-521-23112-4
- The Letters of D. H. Lawrence, Volume IV, June 1921 – March 1924 , ed. Warren Roberts, James T. Boulton and Elizabeth Mansfield, Cambridge University Press, 1987, ISBN 0-521-00695-3
- The Letters of D. H. Lawrence, Volume V, March 1924 – March 1927, ed. James T. Boulton and Lindeth Vasey, Cambridge University Press, 1989, ISBN 0-521-00696-1
- The Letters of D. H. Lawrence, Volume VI, March 1927 – November 1928 , ed. James T. Boulton and Margaret Boulton with Gerald M. Lacy, Cambridge University Press, 1991, ISBN 0-521-00698-8
- The Letters of D. H. Lawrence, Volume VII, November 1928 – February 1930, ed. Keith Sagar and James T. Boulton, Cambridge University Press, 1993, ISBN 0-521-00699-6
- The Letters of D. H. Lawrence, with index, Volume VIII, ed. James T. Boulton, Cambridge University Press, 2001, ISBN 0-521-23117-5
- The Selected Letters of D. H. Lawrence, Compiled and edited by James T. Boulton, Cambridge University Press, 1997, ISBN 0-521-40115-1
