= Nesh =

English dialect word

Nesh is an English dialect adjective meaning 'unusually susceptible to cold weather' and there is no synonym for this use. The Oxford English Dictionary defines the word as: "Soft in texture or consistency; yielding easily to pressure or force. In later use chiefly: tender, succulent, juicy."

Usage in the 21st century has been recorded in Staffordshire, the East Midlands, Lancashire, North Wales, South Yorkshire, Shropshire and Herefordshire. There is a similar term nish used in Newfoundland. In 1905, Volume 4 of the English Dialect Dictionary specified the word as being used more widely, in many dialects across England, Scotland and the United States.

The word comes from Old English hnesce meaning feeble, weak, or infirm. and is a cognate with the 16th century Dutch word nesch typically meaning damp or foolish. The Oxford English Dictionary notes that some etymologists have suggested a connection with Old High German nasc, meaning 'to eat dainty food or delicacies' (the origin of the word nosh), but it dismisses this connection as "unlikely".

Nesh was added, in 2011, to the British Library 'wordbank', a project to preserve regional dialect words and phrases.

== Cultural significance ==
This word has been used in both literature and films where other terms have not been available to convey the particular meaning. Despite being considered a dialect word, and somewhat archaic, writers have periodically turned to it. In addition to its appearance in fiction, in the 19th century it was used in official reports as a general term for susceptibility to cold.

The Middle English derivation "neshe" was used by Geoffrey Chaucer in his 1346 poem The Court of Love.

It seemeth for love his herte is tender and neshe.

The earliest traceable use in modern English, in literature, was in Mary Barton, written by Elizabeth Gaskell in 1848. Gaskell's style is notable for dignifying the use of local dialect words by putting them into the voice of her characters, and of the narrator. It was also used in Gaskell's The Manchester Marriage, written in 1858.

Now, I'm not above being nesh for other folks myself. I can stand a good blow, and never change colour; but, set me in the operating-room in the Infirmary, and I turn as sick as a girl.

At Mrs Wilson's death, Norah came back to them, as nurse to the newly-born little Edwin; into which post she was not installed without a pretty strong oration on the part of the proud and happy father; who declared that if he found out that Norah ever tried to screen the boy by a falsehood, or to make him nesh either in body or mind, she should go that very day.

In 1885 nesh formed a quarter of a curious monograph entitled Four dialect words, clem, lake, nesh, and oss, their modern dialectal range, meanings, pronunciation, etymology, and early or literary use written by Thomas Hallam.

Thomas Hardy used nesh in The Woodlanders, chapter 4, in 1887:

Whenever she and her husband came to a puddle in their walks together he'd take her up like a half-penny doll and put her over without dirting her a speck. And if he keeps the daughter so long at boarding-school, he'll make her as nesh as her mother was.

Frances Hodgson Burnett wrote in The Secret Garden, in 1911:

"Do you ever catch cold?" inquired Mary, gazing at him wonderingly. She had never seen such a funny boy, or such a nice one.

"Not me," he said, grinning "I never ketched cold since I was born. I wasn't brought up nesh enough. I've chased about th' moor in all weathers same as th' rabbits does."

A frequently quoted use of nesh is in D. H. Lawrence's 1913 Sons and Lovers:

"F-ff-f!" he went, pretending to shudder with cold.

"Goodness, man, don't be such a kid!" said Mrs. Morel. "It's not cold."

"Thee strip thysen stark nak'd to wesh thy flesh i' that scullery," said the miner, as he rubbed his hair; "nowt b'r a ice-'ouse!"

"And I shouldn't make that fuss," replied his wife.

"No, tha'd drop down stiff, as dead as a door-knob, wi' thy nesh sides."

Lawrence also used nesh in England, My England (1922), Chapter 4 – "Monkey Nuts":

From the background slowly approached a slender man with a grey moustache and large patches on his trousers.

'You've got'im back 'gain, ah see,' he said to his daughter-in-law. His wife explained how I had found Joey.

'Ah,' went on the grey man. 'It wor our Alfred scared him off, back your life. He must'a flyed ower t'valley. Tha ma' thank thy stars as 'e wor fun, Maggie. 'E'd a bin froze. They a bit nesh, you know,' he concluded to me.

'They are,' I answered. 'This isn't their country.'

The word also appears in the fourth line of Lawrence's "The Risen Lord" (1929):

The risen lord, the risen lord
has risen in the flesh,
and treads the earth to feel the soil
though his feet are still nesh.

The same usage also appears in a much less salubrious context, in the 1985 song "Now 'E's A Puff", by The Macc Lads. Part of one line of the first verse says:

He's gone all nesh, he's makin' us sick...

Nesh was used in the 1950 Michael Powell Technicolor film. Gone to Earth. Abel Woodus says to his daughter, Hazel, "You're too nesh that's what you be. Nesh.", in response to Hazel saying "Seems the world's a big spring trap and us in it.".

Usage continued to be fairly local until the word reached an international audience in the film The Full Monty. This was shot during 1997 on location in Sheffield. In this film nesh was used in the context of feeling cold when others don't.

Since the appearance in the film the word, used for lacking courage, has occurred in the national press.

Nowadays, it is considered to be a gently derogatory comment, that can be used to a friend. An example might be 'Why are you wearing a coat? That's a bit nesh, isn't it?'. A common use of the word can also be when referring to something as being, 'As nesh as a carrot' .

== Usage ==
The Oxford English Dictionary lists several meanings, some of which are obsolete. Those still in use, include:

- Soft in texture or consistency; yielding easily to pressure or force. In later use chiefly: tender, succulent, juicy. For example, "It is hoped that the report will have a wide circulation as a guideline to asking sharp and pertinent questions that strip away the nish outer flesh and get right to the bone of the problem."
- Damp, moist, wet, chilly.
- Lacking courage, spirit, or energy; timid, faint-hearted; lazy, negligent. For example: "The worst crime was the charge of being 'nesh'... It was..nesh to..wait for the bus to stop before jumping into the road [etc.]."
- Delicate, weak, sickly, feeble; unable to endure fatigue, etc.; susceptible (to cold, etc.). For example: "A delicate, easily affected child, who therefore needs more than ordinary care, is said by old people to be nash."
- Fastidious, squeamish, dainty.

The definitions in the Microsoft Encarta Dictionary are:

1. sensitive to cold: very sensitive to cold temperatures.
2. timid: lacking courage or self-confidence.

The New Shorter Oxford English Dictionary defines nesh as: "soft – in consistency, mind, or morals".

Webster's Online Dictionary 1913 defines nesh, in its earlier usage, as: "'Soft, tender, delicate".
