= Brinsley Colliery =

Coal mine in Nottinghamshire, England

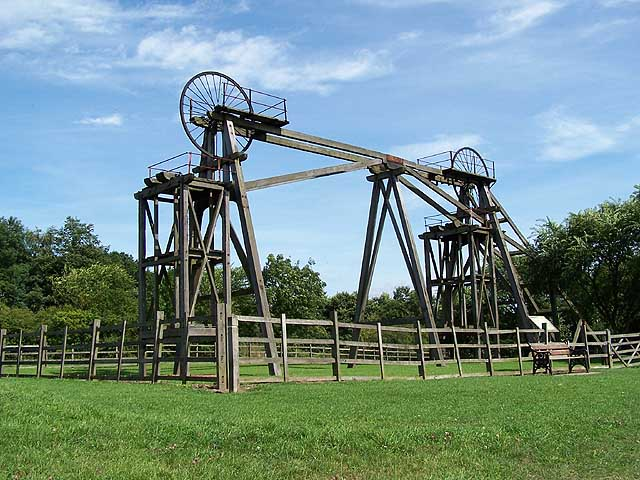
- Brinsley headstocks in August 2005

- Location in Nottinghamshire
- Location: Brinsley, Nottinghamshire, Nottinghamshire, England; 53°02′06″N 1°18′30″W
- Products: Coal
- Opened: 1842
- Closed: 1970

Brinsley Colliery was a coal mine in west Nottinghamshire, close to the boundary with Derbyshire, in what is now Broxtowe district.

== History ==
It was opened around 1842.

It closed as a working pit in 1934 when the seams were exhausted. The shafts were kept open until 1970 for access to neighbouring pits.

== Production ==
It was originally sunk to 450 ft (137m). A second shaft was sunk in 1872 to 780 ft (238m), and the tandem headstocks were built with this shaft.

At peak of production, it was producing 500 tons of coal a day, employing 361 men, of whom 282 worked at the coal face.

== Current site ==
It is now reclaimed and is a picnic site and conservation area, east of the fast-flowing busy A608 road between Eastwood and junction 27 of the M1 at Felley.

== 20th century literature ==
Arthur John Lawrence (18 June 1847 – 1924), father of David Herbert Lawrence, from Eastwood, worked at the pit. Arthur Lawrence was born in Brinsley. Arthur Lawrence's father, Bert, worked at the pit. DH Lawrence's mother came from a middle-class background. There is also reference of this mine in DH Lawrence's short story Odour of Chrysanthemums and this is a focal point of life in the novel

In his book Sons and Lovers, published in May 1913, the colliery is called Beggarlee. In 1999 the Modern Library ranked Sons and Lovers as ninth in their Modern Library 100 Best Novels, with people regarding it as his best book. Beggarlee is also the name of another nearby former pit.

The headstocks of the pit appear in the opening scenes of the 1960 film of the book. The film, directed by Freddie Francis, won the 1960 Academy Award for Best Cinematography.
