= Movements in European History =

Textbook by D.H. Lawrence

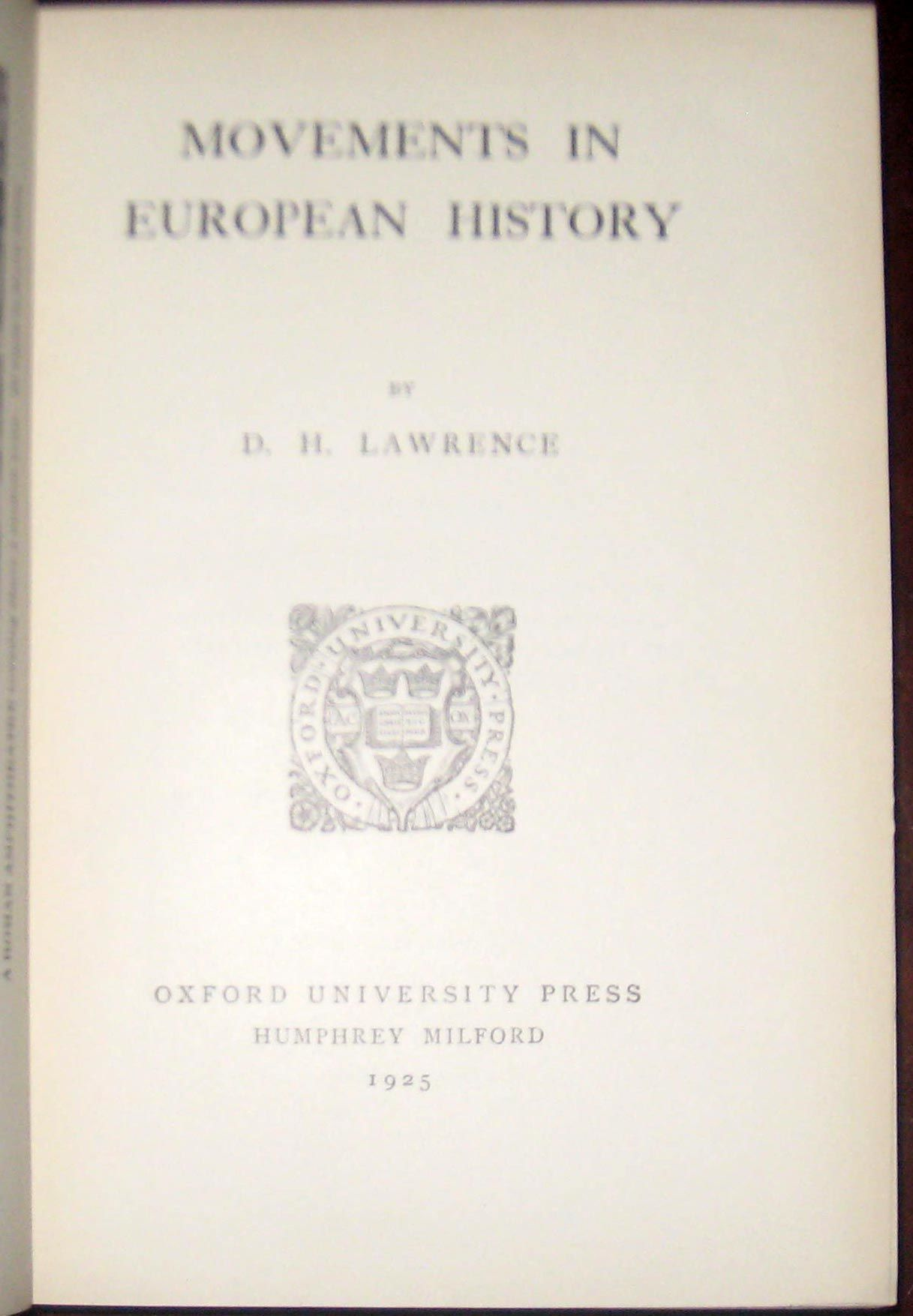
- Author: D. H. Lawrence
- Language: English
- Genre: Non-fiction
- Publisher: Oxford University Press
- Publication date: 1921
- ISBN: 0-521-26201-1

Movements in European History was a school textbook, originally published by Oxford University Press, by the English author D. H. Lawrence. Lawrence was facing destitution at the time and he wrote it as a potboiler. The first edition was published under the pseudonym "Lawrence H. Davison" because his fictional works, such as The Rainbow (1915), had been prosecuted for alleged eroticism.

== Original edition ==
Movements in European History, Oxford University Press, 1921

== Other editions ==
Movements in European History, Illustrated edition, Oxford University Press, 1925, ...Epilogue (intended for the second edition) written in 1924

Movements in European History, Irish Edition, censored, 1926

Movements in European History (1921), Introduction by James T. Boulton, Oxford University Press, 1971

-Re-issued as an Oxford Paperback, 1981, ISBN 0-19-285113-6

== Standard edition ==
Movements in European History (1921), edited by Philip Crumpton, Cambridge University Press, 1989, ISBN 0-521-26201-1

-Paperback edition, Cambridge University Press, 2002, ISBN 978-0-521-00703-0 | ISBN 0-521-00703-8
