= The Princess (Lawrence short story) =

Literary work by D. H. Lawrence

"The Princess" is a short story by the English author D. H. Lawrence. He wrote it in September and October 1924 during a stay at the Kiowa Ranch in New Mexico. The story was first published in instalments in the March, April and May 1925 issues of the Calendar of Modern Letters. It was then printed as a book, along with St Mawr, by Martin Secker on 14 May 1925.

== Standard edition ==
- St Mawr and other stories (1925), edited by Brian Finney, Cambridge University Press, 1983, ISBN 0-521-22265-6
