= The Ladybird =

1923 novella by D. H. Lawrence

First book edition (UK)

The Ladybird is a novella by D. H. Lawrence.

The work was first drafted in 1915 as a short story entitled The Thimble. Lawrence rewrote and extended it under a new title in December 1921, and sent the final version to his English agent on 9 January 1922. It was collected with two other tales, The Captain's Doll and The Fox, and the three novellas were then published in London by Martin Secker in March 1923 under the title The Ladybird and in New York by Thomas Seltzer as The Captain's Doll in April 1923.

== Plot introduction ==
A wounded German officer, Count Psanek, shares his philosophies on life and love with a local acquaintance, Lady Daphne, while interned in London during the final months of the First World War. Lady Daphne finds herself alternately attracted and repulsed by the Count, and when her husband returns home from the front she finds her feelings toward him are equally ambiguous.

== Standard edition ==
- The Ladybird, The Fox, The Captain's Doll (1923), edited by Dieter Mehl, Cambridge University Press, 1992, ISBN 0-521-35266-5
