= The Woman who Rode Away =

Short story by D. H. Lawrence

First US edition

"The Woman who Rode Away" is a short story by D. H. Lawrence. It was written in New Mexico during the summer of 1924 and first published in The Dial in two installments in 1925. It later became the title story for a collection of Lawrence's short stories, The Woman who Rode Away and Other Stories, issued in 1928 by Martin Secker in the UK and Alfred A. Knopf in the US. The cave that features at the end of the story was inspired by a visit to a cave on Lucero Peak that overlooks the town of Arroyo Seco, New Mexico.

The story was inspired by Lawrence's association with Mabel Dodge Luhan (1879–1962). In D. H. Lawrence and The Dial, Nicholas Joost and Alvin Sullivan write that the story constituted Lawrence's "revenge on Mabel Luban.... Lawrence killed off Mrs. Lederman and thus dealt his mortal blow at Mabel Luhan's ideology—her primitivism, her advocacy of Jungian psychology—but he also released something of his own insecurity and self-mistrust in the violent conclusion of his story." Joost and Sullivan add that the story "satirizes rather viciously [Luhan's] adoration of Indian cultures. Yet the story has a purpose much more significant.... It expresses some of the views about civilizations and races which Lawrence held...."

== Standard edition ==
- D. H. Lawrence (1995). The Woman Who Rode Away and Other Stories. ISBN 978-0-521-22270-9.

== Sources ==
- Joost, Nicholas, and Sullivan, Alvin (1970). D. H. Lawrence and The Dial. Carbondale and Edwardsville: Southern Illinois University Press, and London and Amsterdam: Feffer & Simons, Inc.

== See also ==
- The Plumed Serpent
