= The Prussian Officer and Other Stories =

1914 short story collection by D. H. Lawrence

First edition (UK)

The Prussian Officer and Other Stories is a collection of early short stories by D. H. Lawrence. It was published by Duckworth in London on 26 November 1914, and in America by B. W. Huebsch in 1916.

The stories collected in this volume are:

- "The Prussian Officer"
- "The Thorn in the Flesh"
- "Daughters of the Vicar"
- "A Fragment of Stained Glass"
- "The Shades of Spring"
- "Second Best"
- "The Shadow in the Rose Garden"
- "Goose Fair"
- "The White Stocking"
- "A Sick Collier"
- "The Christening"
- "Odour of Chrysanthemums"

== Plot of "The Prussian Officer" ==
The first narrative in the collection is "The Prussian Officer", which tells of a captain and his orderly. Having wasted his youth gambling, the captain has been left with only his military career, and though he has taken on mistresses throughout his life, he remains single. His young orderly is involved in a relationship with a young woman, and the captain, feeling sexual tension towards the young man, prevents the orderly from engaging in the relationship by taking up his evenings. These evenings lead to the captain abusing his orderly and leaving large, painful bruises on his thighs, making it hard for the orderly to walk. Whilst isolated in a forest during manoeuvres, the orderly takes out murderous revenge on the captain, but finds himself in a daze seemingly due both to the pain of the bruises and thirst. The orderly eventually collapses and dies in the hospital shortly thereafter. The corpses of the two men lay side by side.

== Standard edition ==
- The Prussian Officer and other stories (1914), first edition
- The Prussian Officer and other stories (1914) (annoted), edited by John Worthen, Cambridge University Press, 1983, ISBN 0-521-24822-1
