= The Captain's Doll =

1923 novella by D. H. Lawrence

- First US edition (publ. Thomas Seltzer, 1923)
- Author: D. H. Lawrence
- Cover artist: Knud Merrild
- Publisher: Martin Secker
- Publication date: March 1923

The Captain's Doll is a novella by the English author D. H. Lawrence. It was written in 1921 and first published by Martin Secker in March 1923 in a volume with The Ladybird and The Fox. It was the basis of the 1983 TV film of the same name with Jeremy Irons as the Captain.

The story chronicles the journey of fallen German aristocrat Countess Johanna 'Hannele' zu Rassentlow as she dates a Scottish officer of unusual philosophy. The relationship develops into one of D. H. Lawrence's idiosyncratic 'wicked triangles'. The intimate relationship between Captain Alexander Hepburn and Hannele is intruded upon when the captain's wife Evangeline travels to Germany suspicious of foul play.

== Plot ==
The plot unfolds with two parallel narratives; one in the symbolic domain, the other a traditional short story narrative about these protagonists. The concurrent symbolic tale that unfolds centers around the central image of The Captain's Doll–after which the story gains its title. This doll is a striking portrait of the Captain, with his "slender legs" and mesmerizing dark stare encapsulated in the silks and calico of a lifeless, inanimate object.

This doll is an ongoing motif throughout the story as it acts as a metaphor for the dehumanizing effects of war on Hepburn – an English gentleman who had been part of the war machine and in the aftermath has come to believe that "we are worth so very little".

Another profound metaphor and image employed by Lawrence is the great 'glacier' described from afar to be "cold, angry" and a reflection of the captain's deep-seated desire to subjugate Hannele and arguably conquer her "physically, sexually and from the inside" as she muses in free indirect speech narration. The couple ascend the mountain together, and the sheer enormity of this natural wonder prompts discussion of the smallness of a human being in comparison, bringing the captain to make megalomaniacal claims that he is indeed bigger than the mountain. He projects this onto the vast ice, its "soft flesh like" described with uncanny similarity to the earlier descriptions of Hannele swimming in the lake near her new home in Austria.

== Reception ==
Critics have debated the symbolic meaning of this ice monument, as the captain's determination to conquer it points to the obvious metaphorical domination of Hannele who "watches from below" as the crazed captain scrambles to the summit. Reaching the top, the captain is invigorated, yet Lawrence's narration becomes quite introspective of the transformation of the captain's worldview implicitly coupled with description of this barren vista of ice–"a world of ice"–that is "sufficient unto itself in its lifelessness".

Akin to the gender commentary in The Fox on how the war had created a paradigm shift in the social roles within English society, this compelling narrative imparts to the reader a more intimate account of the death of a spirit and the dissemblance of class. The introduction of D. H. Lawrence, Three Novellas, an anthology that collates The Fox, The Captain's Doll, and The Ladybird, makes a comparison between the poetic works of Wilfred Owen and these stories as literary exploration of war that 'pity war'. This comes across in many of Lawrence's letters and implicitly in these texts, as each of the characters is in some way impacted by World War I. Lawrence must have been a keen observer of the social and personal ramifications of World War I, having written and published soon after the war, in 1923.

== Standard edition ==
- The Ladybird, The Fox, The Captain's Doll (1923), edited by Dieter Mehl, Cambridge University Press, 1992, ISBN 0-521-35266-5
