= Mornings in Mexico =

Collection of travel memoirs written by D. H. Lawrence

- First edition
- Author: D. H. Lawrence
- Language: English
- Publisher: Martin Secker
- Publication date: 1927

Mornings in Mexico is a collection of travel essays by D. H. Lawrence, first published by Martin Secker in 1927. These brief works display Lawrence's gifts as a travel writer, catching the 'spirit of place' in his own vivid manner.

Lawrence wrote the first four of these essays at the same time as he was completing and revising his Mexican novel The Plumed Serpent (1926). Three of the others, about Puebloans, were written earlier in 1924 in New Mexico, and the final piece "A Little Moonshine with Lemon" came later as Lawrence remembered his New Mexico ranch (Kiowa Ranch) from Italy. The Cambridge Edition, Mornings in Mexico and Other Essays edited by Virginia Crosswhite Hyde (2009), adds an additional twelve essays, most of them concerning American Southwestern peoples and places.

The eight essays in the original volume are:

- "Corasmin and the Parrots"
- "Walk to Huayapa"
- "The Mozo"
- "Market Day"
- "Indians and Entertainment"
- "Dance of the Sprouting Corn"
- "The Hopi Snake Dance"
- "A Little Moonshine with Lemon".
