= The Widowing of Mrs. Holroyd =

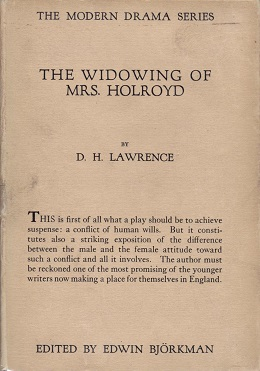
First US publication

The Widowing of Mrs. Holroyd is a play by the English writer D. H. Lawrence. It was written in 1911 and the revised version was published in 1914 by Duckworth & Co. in London and Mitchell Kennerley in New York. It is the dramatisation of Lawrence's short story "Odour of Chrysanthemums".

== Plot introduction ==
Mrs. Holroyd is married to a loutish miner, who drinks, patronizes prostitutes, and apparently brutalizes her. When a gentlemanly neighbor makes romantic advances to her, she wishes her husband dead. Sooner than she hoped, her wish comes true—when her husband dies in a mining accident.

When Charles Holroyd's body is brought home from the mine, and his wife and mother must wash him and lay him out for his funeral, we see for the first time the other side of the relationship between Mr. and Mrs. Holroyd—now, when it's too late.

== Real life connection ==
As in many of Lawrence's works there is a real life connection to The Widowing of Mrs. Holroyd. Even though his uncle had been killed in a pit accident before Lawrence was born, the story would be told often in the family. The real life 'Mrs. Holroyd' was in fact his aunt Polly, who "lived in a tiny cottage just up the line from the railway crossing at Brinsley, near Eastwood." Lawrence may have borrowed the surname from the company that his elder brother Ernest worked for in London: John Holroyd and Company. However, the personal experience of the issues that are discussed in the play, such as the drunken miner's evening absence and the mother's scornful hate are the experiences of his own mother and father rather than his aunt's family's.
