= Studies in Classic American Literature =

Book by D.H. Lawrence

- Cover of the first edition
- Author: D.H. Lawrence
- Language: English
- Subject: American literature
- Publisher: Thomas Seltzer
- Publication date: 1923
- Publication place: United States
- Media type: Print
- Pages: 264

Studies in Classic American Literature is a work of literary criticism by the English writer D. H. Lawrence. It was first published by Thomas Seltzer in the United States in August 1923. The British edition was published in June 1924 by Martin Secker.

The authors discussed include Benjamin Franklin, J. Hector St. John de Crèvecœur, James Fenimore Cooper, Edgar Allan Poe, Nathaniel Hawthorne, Richard Henry Dana Jr., Herman Melville, and Walt Whitman.

== Reception ==
Edmund Wilson described Studies in Classic American Literature as "one of the few first-rate books that have ever been written on the subject" despite "shots that do not hit the mark and moments that are quite hysterical." Lawrence's work is generally credited with contributing to the restoration of Herman Melville as a seminal figure in American literature.

== Standard editions ==
- Studies in Classic American Literature (1923), edited by Ezra Greenspan, Lindeth Vasey and John Worthen, Cambridge University Press, 2002, ISBN 0-521-55016-5
