= Birds, Beasts and Flowers =

Collection of poems by D.H. Lawrence

- Cover of the first edition
- Author: D. H. Lawrence
- Language: English
- Genre: Poetry
- Publisher: Martin Secker
- Publication date: 1923
- Publication place: London, England, United Kingdom
- Media type: Hardcover
- Pages: 207
- OCLC: 2607626

Birds, Beasts and Flowers is a collection of poetry by the English author D. H. Lawrence, first published in 1923. These poems include some of Lawrence's finest reflections on the 'otherness' of the non-human world.

Lawrence started the poems in this collection during a stay in San Gervasio near Florence in September 1920. He continued working on individual poems in Taormina (Sicily), Ceylon and Australia before completing the book in February 1923 whilst staying in New Mexico.

Many of these individual poems are popular in anthologies. However, they also need to be seen within the context of the whole book. In preparing the original collection for publication, the author grouped the poems into the sequence shown in the table of contents and then prefaced many of the sub-sections with brief quotations from the third edition of John Burnet's Early Greek Philosophy, a book that he was particularly interested in at the time.

== Table of contents ==
- FRUITS:
  - Pomegranate
  - Peach
  - Medlars and Sorb-Apples
  - Fig
  - Grapes
- The Revolutionary
- The Evening Land
- Peace
- TREES:
  - Cypresses
  - Bare Fig-Trees
  - Bare Almond-Trees
- Tropic
- Southern Night
- FLOWERS:
  - Almond Blossom
  - Purple Anemones
  - Sicilian Cyclamens
  - Hibiscus and Salvia Flowers
- THE EVANGELISTIC BEASTS:
  - St Matthew
  - St Mark
  - St Luke
  - St John
- CREATURES:
  - Mosquito
  - Fish
  - Bat
  - Man and Bat
- REPTILES:
  - Snake
  - Baby Tortoise
  - Tortoise Shell
  - Tortoise Family Connections
  - Lui et Elle
  - Tortoise Gallantry
  - Tortoise Shout
- BIRDS:
  - Turkey-Cock
  - Humming-Bird
  - Eagle in New Mexico
  - Blue Jay
- ANIMALS:
  - Ass
  - He-Goat
  - She-Goat
  - Elephant
  - Kangaroo
  - Bibbles
  - Mountain Lion
  - The Red Wolf
- GHOSTS:
  - Men in New Mexico
  - Autumn at Taos
  - Spirits summoned West
- The American Eagle

== Standard edition ==
- Birds, Beasts and Flowers, Black Sparrow Press, Santa Rosa, 2001 ISBN 0-87685-867-1
