= D. H. Lawrence =

English writer and poet (1885–1930)

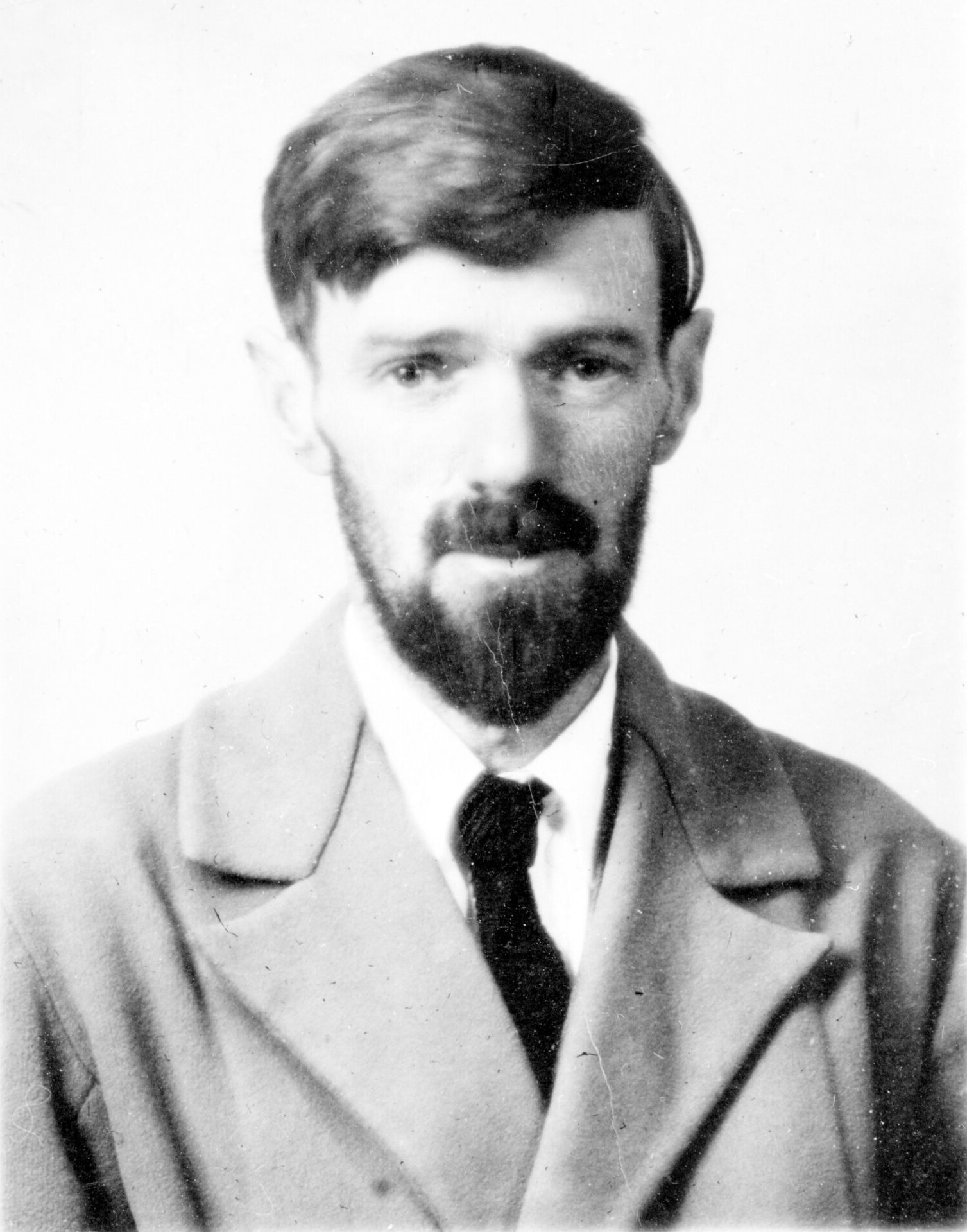
- Lawrence in 1929
- Born: David Herbert Richards Lawrence; 11 September 1885; Eastwood, Nottinghamshire, England
- Died: 2 March 1930 (aged 44); Vence, Alpes-Maritimes, France
- Resting place: Mediterranean Sea and D. H. Lawrence Ranch, Taos, New Mexico, US
- Education: University College Nottingham
- Spouse: Frieda Weekley (m. 1914)
- Writing career
- Language: English
- Period: 1907–1930
- Genres: Modernism; philosophical fiction
- Notable works: Novels: Sons and Lovers; The Rainbow; Women in Love; Lady Chatterley's Lover; Short stories: "Odour of Chrysanthemums"; "The Rocking-Horse Winner"

David Herbert Lawrence (11 September 1885 – 2 March 1930) was an English novelist, short story writer, poet, playwright, literary critic, travel writer, essayist, and painter. His modernist works reflect on modernity, social alienation and industrialisation, while championing sexuality, vitality and instinct. Four of his most famous novels – Sons and Lovers (1913), The Rainbow (1915), Women in Love (1920), and Lady Chatterley's Lover (1928) – were the subject of censorship trials for their radical portrayals of romance, sexuality, and use of explicit language.

Lawrence's opinions and artistic preferences earned him a controversial reputation; he endured persecution and the misrepresentation of his creative work throughout his life, much of which he spent in a voluntary exile that he described as a "savage enough pilgrimage". At the time of his death, he had been variously scorned as tasteless, avant-garde, and a pornographer who had only garnered success for erotica; however, the English novelist and critic E. M. Forster, in an obituary notice, challenged this widely held view, describing him as "the greatest imaginative novelist of our generation". Later, the English literary critic F. R. Leavis also championed both Lawrence's artistic integrity and his moral seriousness.

== Early life and education ==
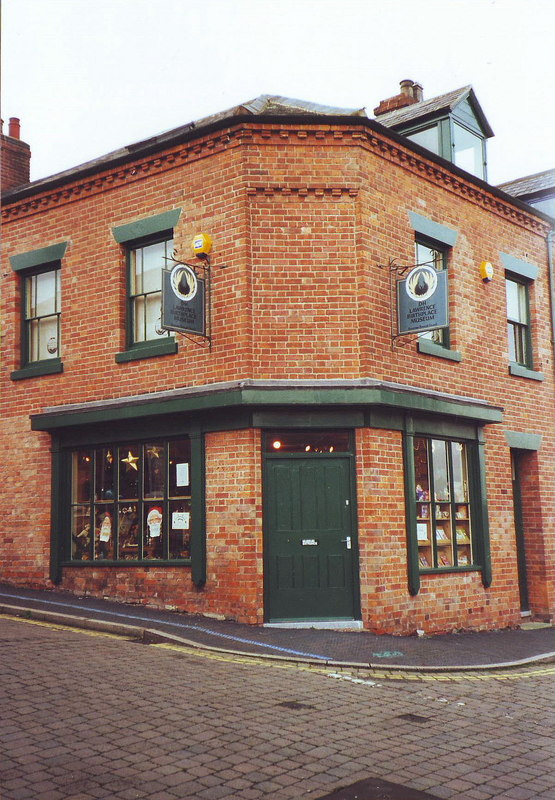
D. H. Lawrence Birthplace Museum in Eastwood, Nottinghamshire

Lawrence was born on 11 September 1885, in Eastwood, Nottinghamshire, England, the fourth child of Arthur John Lawrence, a barely literate miner at Brinsley Colliery, and Lydia Lawrence (née Beardsall), a former pupil-teacher who had been obliged to perform manual work in a lace factory due to her family's financial difficulties. He spent his formative years in the coal mining town of Eastwood, Nottinghamshire. The house in which he was born, 8a Victoria Street, is now the D. H. Lawrence Birthplace Museum. His working class background and the tensions between his parents provided the raw material for some of his early works. Lawrence roamed out from an early age in the patches of open, hilly country and remaining fragments of Sherwood Forest in Felley woods to the north of Eastwood, beginning a lifelong appreciation of the natural world, and he often wrote about "the country of my heart" as a setting for much of his fiction. Although Lawrence's father wanted his sons "to go down pit", his mother "was bitterly determined that her children should not earn their livings by any kind of manual labor", and she prevailed, at least as to Lawrence.

Lawrence attended Greasley Beauvale Board School near Eastwood from 1891 until 1898, becoming the first local pupil to win a county council scholarship to Nottingham High School in nearby Nottingham. He left Nottingham High School in 1901, working for three months as a junior clerk at Haywood's surgical appliances factory, but a severe bout of pneumonia ended this career. During his convalescence he often visited Hagg's Farm in Underwood, the home of the Chambers family, and began a friendship with one of the daughters, Jessie Chambers, who would inspire characters he created in his writing. An important aspect of his relationship with Chambers and other adolescent acquaintances was a shared love of books, an interest that lasted throughout Lawrence's life.

In a private letter written in 1908, Lawrence voiced support for eugenics by the method of a "lethal chamber" to dispose of "all the sick, the halt, the maimed".

Lawrence was an early supporter of the poet Anna Wickham, whose work he admired and encouraged, recommending her poetry for publication.

== Career ==
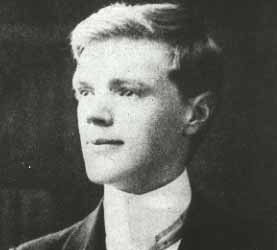
Lawrence at age 21 in 1906

From 1902 until 1906, Lawrence was a pupil-teacher at the British School in Eastwood. He went on to become a full-time student and received a teaching certificate from University College, Nottingham (then an external college of University of London), in 1908. During these early years he was working on his first poems, some short stories, and a draft of a novel, Laetitia, which was eventually to become The White Peacock. At the end of 1907, he won a short story competition in the Nottinghamshire Guardian, the first time that he had gained any wider recognition for his literary talents.

=== Early career ===
In the autumn of 1908, the newly qualified Lawrence left his childhood home for London. While teaching in Davidson Road School, Croydon, he continued writing. Jessie Chambers submitted some of Lawrence's early poetry to Ford Madox Ford (then known as Ford Hermann Hueffer), editor of the influential The English Review. Hueffer then commissioned the story "Odour of Chrysanthemums" which, when published in that magazine, encouraged Heinemann, a London publisher, to ask Lawrence for more work. His career as a professional author now began in earnest, although he taught for another year.

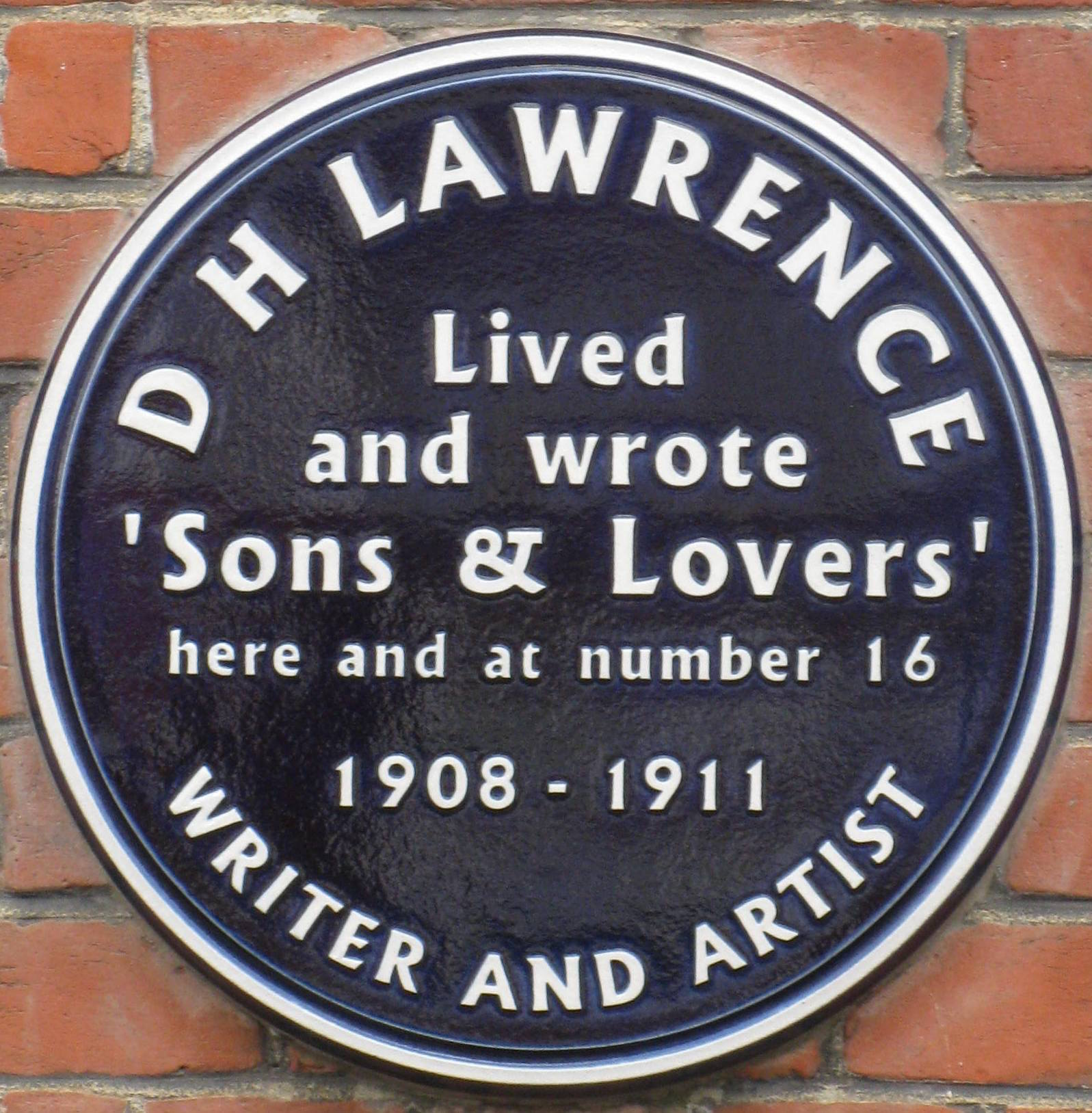
A commemorative plaque to Lawrence on Colworth Road in Croydon, south London

Shortly after the final proofs of his first published novel, The White Peacock, appeared in 1910, Lawrence's mother died of cancer, leaving him devastated. He described the following few months as his "sick year". Due to Lawrence's close relationship with his mother, his grief became a major turning point in his life. Essentially concerned with the emotional battle for Lawrence's love between his mother and "Miriam" (based on Jessie Chambers), the novel also documents Lawrence's (through his protagonist, Paul) brief intimate relationship with Chambers that Lawrence had finally initiated in the Christmas of 1909, ending it in August 1910. The hurt this caused Chambers and, finally, her portrayal in the novel, ended their friendship; after it was published, they never spoke again.

In 1911, Lawrence was introduced to Edward Garnett, a publisher's reader, who acted as a mentor and became a valued friend, as did his son David. Throughout these months, the young author revised Paul Morel, the first draft of what became Sons and Lovers. In addition, a teaching colleague, Helen Corke, gave him access to her intimate diaries about an unhappy love affair, which formed the basis of The Trespasser, his second novel. In November 1911, Lawrence came down with a pneumonia again; once recovered, he abandoned teaching in order to become a full-time writer. In February 1912, he broke off an engagement to Louie Burrows, an old friend from his days in Nottingham and Eastwood.

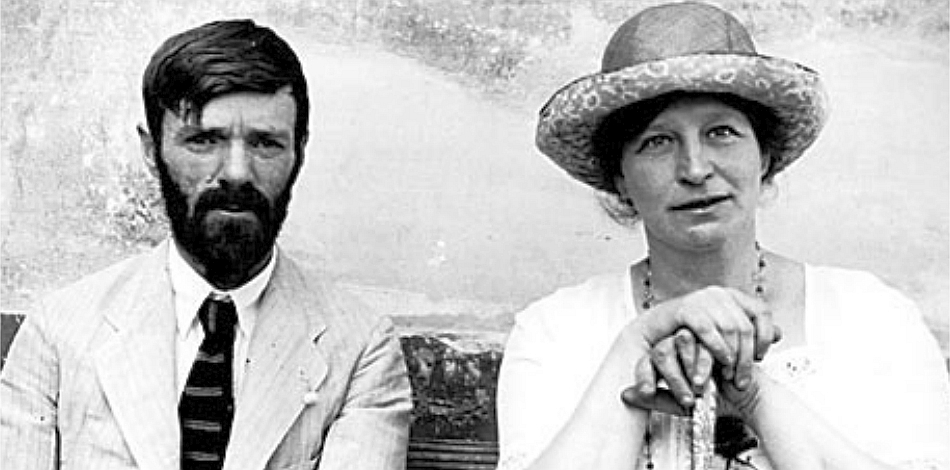
Lawrence and Frieda Lawrence in 1914

In March 1912, Lawrence met Frieda Weekley (née von Richthofen), with whom he was to share the rest of his life. Six years his senior, she was married to Ernest Weekley, his former modern languages professor at University College, Nottingham, and had three young children. However, she and Lawrence eloped and left England for Frieda's parents' home in Metz, a garrison town (then in Germany) near the disputed border with France. Lawrence experienced his first encounter with tensions between Germany and France when he was arrested and accused of being a British spy, before being released following an intervention from Frieda's father. After this incident, Lawrence left for a small hamlet to the south of Munich where he was joined by Frieda for their "honeymoon", later memorialised in the series of love poems titled Look! We Have Come Through (1917).

In 1912, Lawrence wrote the first of his so-called "mining plays", The Daughter-in-Law, written in Nottingham dialect. The play was not performed or even published in Lawrence's lifetime.

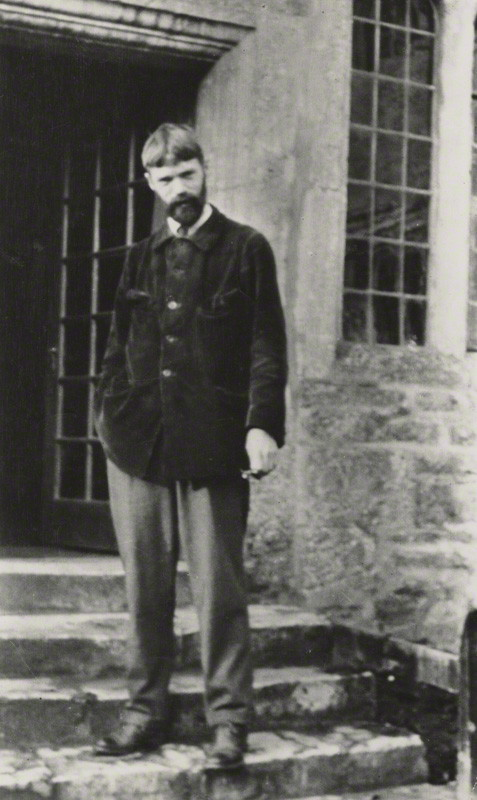
A photo of Lawrence by Lady Ottoline Morrell in November 1915

From Germany, they walked southwards across the Alps to Italy, a journey that was recorded in the first of his travel books, a collection of linked essays titled Twilight in Italy and the unfinished novel, Mr Noon.

During his stay in Italy, Lawrence completed the final version of Sons and Lovers. Having become tired of the manuscript, he allowed Edward Garnett to cut roughly 100 pages from the text. The novel was published in 1913 and hailed as a vivid portrait of the realities of working class provincial life.

Lawrence and Frieda returned to Britain in 1913 for a short visit, during which they encountered and befriended critic John Middleton Murry and New Zealand-born short story writer Katherine Mansfield.

Also during that year, on 28 July, Lawrence met the Welsh tramp poet W. H. Davies, whose nature poetry he initially admired. Davies collected autographs, and was keen to have Lawrence's. Georgian poetry publisher Edward Marsh secured this for Davies, probably as part of a signed poem, and also arranged a meeting between the poet and Lawrence and his wife. Despite his early enthusiasm for Davies' work, Lawrence's view cooled after reading Foliage; whilst in Italy, he also disparaged Nature Poems, calling them "so thin, one can hardly feel them".

After the couple returned to Italy, staying in a cottage in Fiascherino on the Gulf of Spezia Lawrence wrote the first draft of what would later be transformed into two of his best-known novels, The Rainbow and Women in Love, in which unconventional female characters take centre stage. Both novels were highly controversial and were banned on publication in the UK for obscenity, although Women in Love was banned only temporarily.

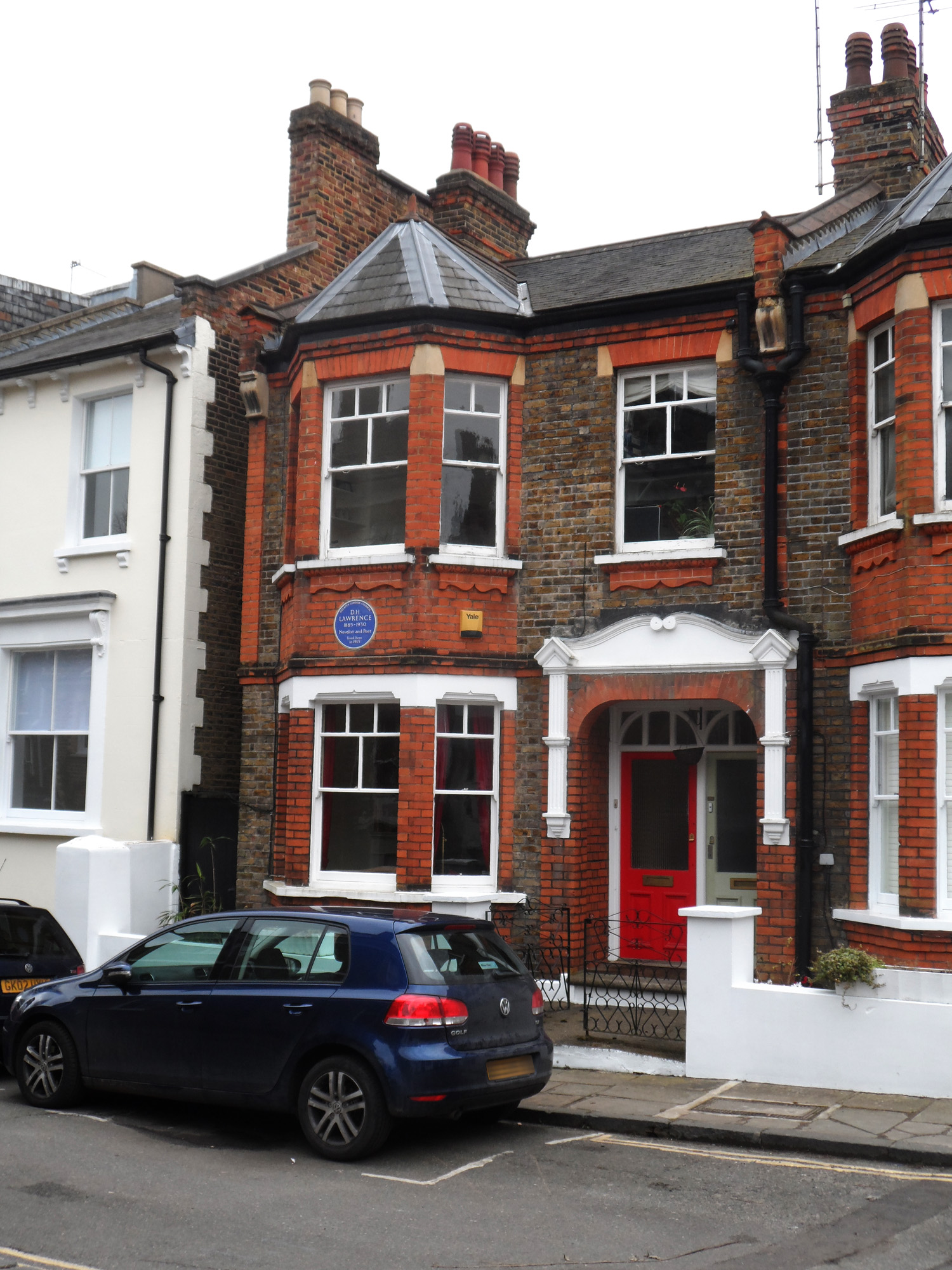
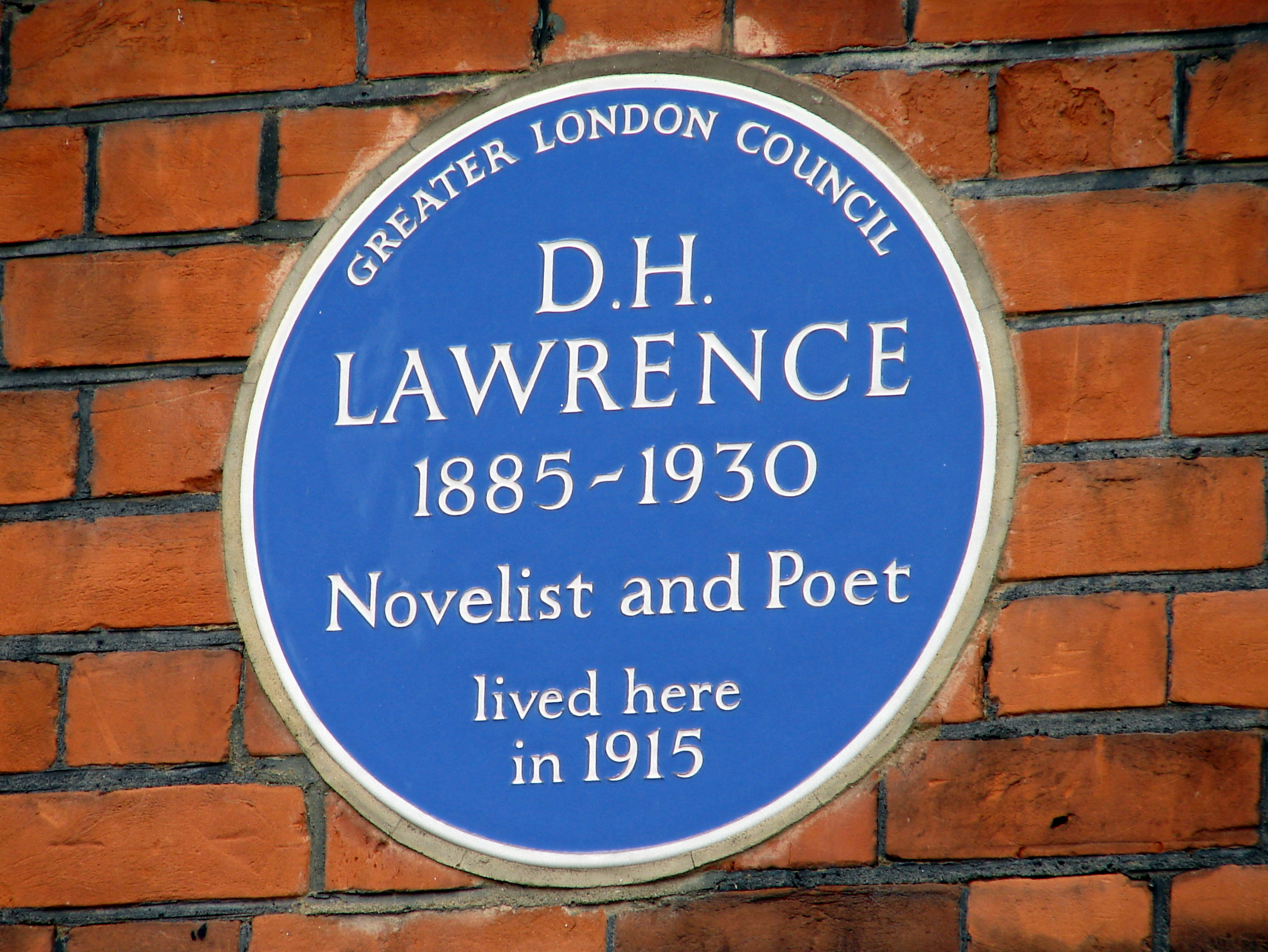
Lawrence's house in Camden, London in 1915, with a close up of the commemorative blue plaque at the address

The Rainbow follows three generations of a Nottinghamshire farming family from the pre-industrial to the industrial age, focusing particularly on a daughter, Ursula, and her aspiration for a more fulfilling life than that of becoming a housebound wife. Women in Love delves into the complex relationships between four major characters, including Ursula of The Rainbow and her sister Gudrun. Both novels explore grand themes and ideas that challenged conventional thought on the arts, politics, economic growth, gender, sexual experience, friendship, and marriage. Lawrence's views as expressed in the novels are now thought to be far ahead of his time. The frank and relatively straightforward manner in which he wrote about sexual attraction was ostensibly why the books were initially banned, in particular the mention of same-sex attraction; Ursula has an affair with a woman in The Rainbow, and there is an undercurrent of attraction between the two principal male characters in Women in Love.

While working on Women in Love in Cornwall during 1916–17, Lawrence developed a strong relationship with a Cornish farmer named William Henry Hocking, which some scholars believe was possibly romantic, especially considering Lawrence's fascination with the theme of homosexuality in Women in Love. Although Lawrence never made it clear whether their relationship was sexual, Frieda believed it was. In a 1913 letter, he writes, "I should like to know why nearly every man that approaches greatness tends to homosexuality, whether he admits it or not...." He is also quoted as saying, "I believe the nearest I've come to perfect love was with a young coal-miner when I was about 16." However, given his enduring and robust relationship with Frieda, it is likely that he was primarily what might be termed today bisexual, and whether he actually ever had homosexual relations remains an open question.

Frieda obtained her divorce from Ernest Weekley. Lawrence and Frieda returned to Britain shortly before the outbreak of World War I and were married on 13 July 1914. During this time, Lawrence worked with London intellectuals and writers such as Dora Marsden, T. S. Eliot, Ezra Pound, and others connected with The Egoist, an important Modernist literary magazine that published some of his work. Lawrence also worked on adapting Filippo Tommaso Marinetti's Manifesto of Futurism into English. He also met the young Jewish artist Mark Gertler, with whom he became good friends for a time; Lawrence would later express his admiration for Gertler's 1916 anti-war painting, Merry-Go-Round as "the best modern picture I have seen.... it is great and true." Gertler would inspire the character Loerke (a sculptor) in Women in Love.

Frieda's German parentage and Lawrence's open contempt for militarism caused them to be viewed with suspicion and be forced to live in near-destitution in wartime Britain; this suspicion may have contributed to The Rainbow being suppressed and investigated in 1915 for its alleged obscenity. Later, the couple were accused of spying and signalling to German submarines off the coast of Cornwall, where they lived at Zennor. During this period, Lawrence finished his final draft of Women in Love. Not published until 1920, it is now widely recognised as a novel of great dramatic force and intellectual subtlety.

In late 1917, after constant harassment by the armed forces and other authorities, Lawrence was forced to leave Cornwall on three days' notice under the terms of the Defence of the Realm Act. He described this persecution in an autobiographical chapter of his novel Kangaroo (1923). Lawrence spent a few months of early 1918 in the small, rural village of Hermitage near Newbury, Berkshire. Subsequently, he lived for just under a year (mid-1918 to early 1919) at Mountain Cottage, Middleton-by-Wirksworth, Derbyshire, where he wrote one of his most poetic short stories, Wintry Peacock. Until 1919, poverty compelled him to shift from address to address.

During the 1918 influenza pandemic, he barely survived a severe attack of influenza.

=== Exile ===
After the wartime years, Lawrence began what he termed his "savage pilgrimage", a time of voluntary exile from his native country. He escaped from Britain at the earliest practical opportunity and returned only twice for brief visits, spending the remainder of his life travelling with Frieda. This wanderlust took him to Australia, Italy, Ceylon (Sri Lanka), the United States, Mexico and the south of France. Abandoning Britain in November 1919, they headed south, first to the Abruzzo region in central Italy and then onwards to Capri and the Fontana Vecchia in Taormina, Sicily. From Sicily they made brief excursions to Sardinia, Monte Cassino, Malta, Northern Italy, Austria and Southern Germany.

Many of these places appear in Lawrence's writings, including The Lost Girl (for which he won the James Tait Black Memorial Prize for fiction), Aaron's Rod, and the fragment titled Mr Noon (the first part of which was published in the Phoenix II anthology of his works, and in its entirety in 1984). He wrote novellas such as The Captain's Doll, The Fox and The Ladybird. In addition, some of his short stories were issued in the collection England, My England and Other Stories. During these years Lawrence also wrote poems about the natural world in Birds, Beasts and Flowers.

Lawrence is often considered one of the finest travel writers in English. His travel books are Twilight in Italy, Etruscan Places, Mornings in Mexico, and Sea and Sardinia, which describes a brief journey he undertook in January 1921 and focuses on the life of Sardinia's people. Less well known is his eighty-four page introduction to Maurice Magnus's 1924 Memoirs of the Foreign Legion, in which Lawrence recalls his visit to the monastery of Monte Cassino. Lawrence told his friend Catherine Carswell that his introduction to Magnus's Memoirs was "the best single piece of writing, as writing, that he had ever done". Norman Douglas criticized Lawrence's introduction to Magnus's book in A Plea for Better Manners. Lawrence replied to A Plea for Better Manners with "The Late Mr Maurice Magnus: A Letter," in New Statesman, 20 February 1926.

His other nonfiction books include two responses to Freudian psychoanalysis, Psychoanalysis and the Unconscious and Fantasia of the Unconscious; Apocalypse and Other Writings on Revelation; and Movements in European History, a school textbook published under a pseudonym, because of Lawrence's blighted reputation in Britain.

=== Later life and career ===
In late February 1922, the Lawrences left Europe, intending to migrate to the United States. They sailed in an easterly direction, however, first to Ceylon and then on to Australia. During a short residence in Darlington, Western Australia, Lawrence met local writer Mollie Skinner, with whom he coauthored the novel The Boy in the Bush. This stay was followed by a brief stop in the small coastal town of Thirroul, New South Wales, during which Lawrence completed Kangaroo, a novel about local fringe politics that also explored his wartime experiences in Cornwall.

The Lawrences finally arrived in the United States in September 1922. Lawrence had several times discussed the idea of setting up a utopian community with several of his friends, having written in 1915 to Willie Hopkin, his old socialist friend from Eastwood:

I want to gather together about twenty souls and sail away from this world of war and squalor and found a little colony where there shall be no money but a sort of communism as far as necessaries of life go, and some real decency … a place where one can live simply, apart from this civilisation … [with] a few other people who are also at peace and happy and live, and understand and be free.…

It was with this in mind that they made for Taos, New Mexico, a Pueblo town where many white "bohemians" had settled, including Mabel Dodge Luhan, a prominent socialite. Here they eventually acquired the 160-acre (0.65 km^{2}) Kiowa Ranch, now called the D. H. Lawrence Ranch, in 1924 from Dodge Luhan in exchange for the manuscript of Sons and Lovers. The couple stayed in New Mexico for two years, with extended visits to Lake Chapala and Oaxaca in Mexico. While Lawrence was in New Mexico, he was visited by Aldous Huxley.

Editor and book designer Merle Armitage wrote a book about D. H. Lawrence in New Mexico. Taos Quartet in Three Movements was originally to appear in Flair magazine, but the magazine folded before its publication. This short work describes the tumultuous relationship of D. H. Lawrence, his wife Frieda, artist Dorothy Brett, and Mabel Dodge Sterne Luhan. Armitage took it upon himself to print 16 hardcover copies of this work for his friends. Richard Pousette-Dart executed the drawings for Taos Quartet, published in 1950.

While in the US, Lawrence rewrote and, in 1923, published Studies in Classic American Literature, which Edmund Wilson described as "one of the few first-rate books that have ever been written on the subject". These interpretations, with their insights into symbolism, New England Transcendentalism and the Puritan sensibility, were a significant factor in the revival of the reputation of Herman Melville during the early 1920s. In addition, Lawrence completed new fictional works, including The Boy in the Bush, The Plumed Serpent, St Mawr, The Woman who Rode Away, The Princess and other short stories. He also produced the collection of linked travel essays that became Mornings in Mexico.

A brief voyage to England at the end of 1923 was a failure and Lawrence soon returned to Taos, convinced his life as an author now lay in the United States. However, in March 1925 he suffered a near fatal attack of malaria and tuberculosis while on a third visit to Mexico. Although he eventually recovered, the diagnosis of his condition obliged him to return once again to Europe. He was dangerously ill and poor health limited his ability to travel for the remainder of his life. The Lawrences made their home in a villa in Northern Italy near Florence, where he wrote The Virgin and the Gipsy and the various versions of Lady Chatterley's Lover (1928). The latter book, his last major novel, was initially published in private editions in Florence and Paris and reinforced his notoriety. A story set once more in Nottinghamshire about a cross-class relationship between a Lady and her gamekeeper, it broke new ground in describing their sexual relationship in explicit yet literary language. Lawrence hoped to challenge the British taboos around sex: to enable men and women "to think sex, fully, completely, honestly, and cleanly." Lawrence responded robustly to those who took offence, even publishing books of poems (Pansies and Nettles) as well as a tract on Pornography and Obscenity.

The return to Italy allowed him to renew old friendships; during these years he was particularly close to Aldous Huxley, who was to edit the first collection of Lawrence's letters after his death, along with a memoir. After Lawrence visited local archaeological sites (particularly old tombs) with artist Earl Brewster in April 1927, his collected essays inspired by the excursions were published as Sketches of Etruscan Places, a book that contrasts the lively past with Benito Mussolini's fascism. Lawrence continued to produce short stories and other works of fiction such as The Escaped Cock (also published as The Man Who Died), an unorthodox reworking of the story of Jesus Christ's Resurrection.

During his final years, Lawrence renewed his serious interest in oil painting. Official harassment persisted; an exhibition of his paintings at the Warren Gallery in London was raided by the police in mid-1929, and several works were confiscated.

=== Death ===
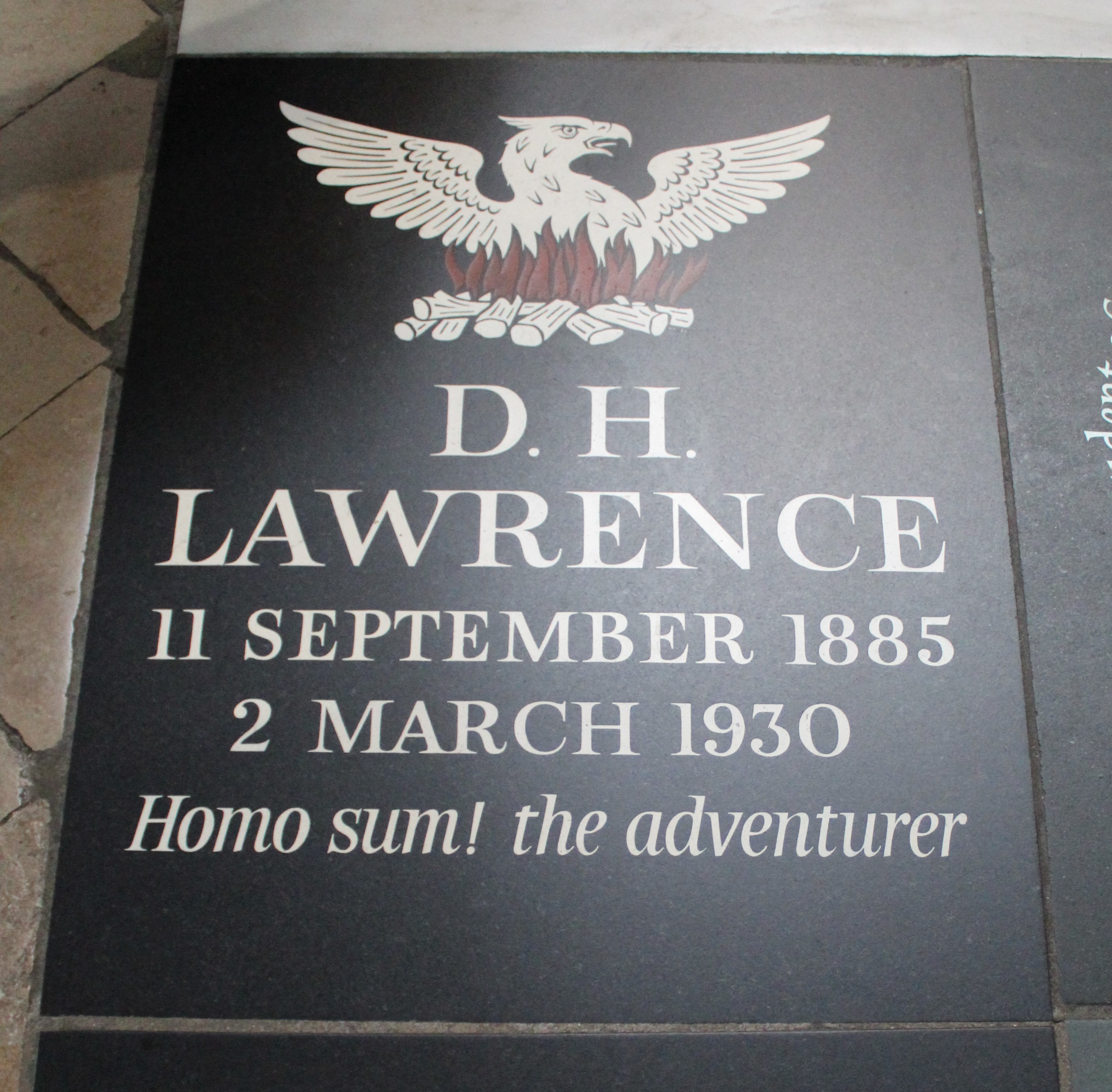
D. H. Lawrence's memorial stone in Westminster Abbey, London

Lawrence continued to write despite his failing health. In his last months he wrote numerous poems, reviews, and essays, as well as a robust defence of his last novel against those who sought to suppress it. His last significant works were Apocalypse, a reflection on the Book of Revelation, and Are Men of Today a Success?, a posthumous contribution on the feminisation of modern society.

After being discharged from a sanatorium, Lawrence died on 2 March 1930 at the Villa Robermond in Vence, France, from complications of tuberculosis. Frieda commissioned an elaborate headstone for his grave bearing a mosaic of his adopted emblem of the phoenix. After Lawrence's death, Frieda lived with the couple's friend Angelo Ravagli on a ranch in the mountains of Taos, New Mexico and eventually married him in 1950. In 1935, Ravagli arranged, on Frieda's behalf, to have Lawrence's body exhumed and cremated. However, upon boarding the ship he learned he would have to pay taxes on the ashes, so he instead scattered them in the Mediterranean, a preferable resting place, in his opinion, to a concrete block in a chapel. Dust and earth were interred in a small chapel on the Taos ranch, where they remain.

== Written works ==
=== Novels ===
Lawrence is best known for his novels Sons and Lovers, The Rainbow, Women in Love and Lady Chatterley's Lover. In these books, Lawrence explores the possibilities for life within an industrial setting, particularly the nature of relationships that can be had within such a setting. Though often classed as a realist, Lawrence in fact uses his characters to give form to his personal philosophy. His depiction of sexuality, seen as shocking when his work was first published in the early 20th century, has its roots in this highly personal way of thinking and being.

Lawrence was very interested in the sense of touch, and his focus on physical intimacy has its roots in a desire to restore an emphasis on the body and rebalance it with what he perceived to be Western civilisation's overemphasis on the mind; in a 1929 essay, "Men Must Work and Women As Well", he wrote:

"Now then we see the trend of our civilization, in terms of human feeling and human relation. It is, and there is no denying it, towards a greater and greater abstraction from the physical, towards a further and further physical separateness between men and women, and between individual and individual.... It only remains for some men and women, individuals, to try to get back their bodies and preserve the other flow of warmth, affection and physical unison. There is nothing else to do." Phoenix II: Uncollected, Unpublished, and Other Prose Works by D.H. Lawrence, ed. Warren Roberts and Harry T. Moore (New York: The Viking Press, 1968), pp. 589, 591.

In his later years, Lawrence wrote the novellas St Mawr, The Virgin and the Gypsy and The Escaped Cock.

=== Short stories ===
Lawrence's best-known short stories include "The Captain's Doll", "The Fox", "The Ladybird", "Odour of Chrysanthemums", "The Princess", "The Rocking-Horse Winner", "St Mawr", "The Virgin and the Gypsy" and "The Woman who Rode Away". (The Virgin and the Gypsy was published as a novella after he died.) Among his most praised collections is The Prussian Officer and Other Stories, published in 1914. His collection The Woman Who Rode Away and Other Stories, published in 1928, develops the theme of leadership and power that Lawrence also explored in novels such as Kangaroo and The Plumed Serpent and the story Fanny and Annie. "Not until 1928 did Lawrence admit that 'the leader of men is a back number' and 'the leader-cum-follower relationship is a bore' and return to write of more private personal relationships."

=== Poetry ===
Lawrence wrote almost 800 poems, most of them relatively short. His first poems were written in 1904 and two of his poems, "Dreams Old" and "Dreams Nascent", were among his earliest published works in The English Review. It has been claimed that his early works clearly place him in the school of Georgian poets, and indeed some of his poems appear in the Georgian Poetry anthologies. However, James Reeves in his book on Georgian Poetry notes that Lawrence was never really a Georgian poet. Indeed, later critics contrast Lawrence's energy and dynamism with the complacency of Georgian poetry.

Just as the First World War dramatically changed the work of many of the poets who saw service in the trenches, Lawrence's own work dramatically changed during his years in Cornwall. During this time, he wrote free verse influenced by Walt Whitman. He set forth his manifesto for much of his later verse in the introduction to New Poems. "We can get rid of the stereotyped movements and the old hackneyed associations of sound or sense. We can break down those artificial conduits and canals through which we do so love to force our utterance. We can break the stiff neck of habit.... But we cannot positively prescribe any motion, any rhythm."

Lawrence rewrote some of his early poems when they were collected in 1928. This was in part to fictionalise them, but also to remove some of the artifice of his first works. As he put it, "A young man is afraid of his demon and puts his hand over the demon's mouth sometimes and speaks for him." His best-known poems are probably those dealing with nature, such as those in the collection Birds, Beasts and Flowers, including the Tortoise poems and "Snake", which is one of his most frequently anthologised and displays some of his most frequent concerns, including modern man's distance from nature. It also subtly hints at religious themes.

In the deep, strange-scented shade of the great dark carob tree
I came down the steps with my pitcher
And must wait, must stand and wait, for there he was at the trough before me.
(From "Snake")

Look! We have come through! is his other work from the period of the end of the war and it reveals another important element common to much of his writings; his inclination to lay himself bare in his writings. Ezra Pound in his Literary Essays complained of Lawrence's interest in his own "disagreeable sensations" but praised him for his "low-life narrative". This is a reference to Lawrence's dialect poems akin to the Scots poems of Robert Burns, in which he reproduced the language and concerns of the people of Nottinghamshire from his youth.

Tha thought tha wanted ter be rid o' me.
'Appen tha did, an' a'.
Tha thought tha wanted ter marry an' se
If ter couldna be master an' th' woman's boss,
Tha'd need a woman different from me,
An' tha knowed it; ay, yet tha comes across
Ter say goodbye! an' a'.
(From "The Drained Cup")

Although Lawrence's works after his Georgian period are in the modernist tradition, they were often different from those of many other modernist writers, such as Pound. Pound's poems were often austere, with every word carefully worked on. Lawrence felt all poems had to be personal sentiments and that a sense of spontaneity was vital. He called one collection of poems Pansies, partly for the ephemeral nature of the verse, but also as a pun on the French word panser, to dress or bandage a wound. "Pansies", as he made explicit in the introduction to New Poems, is also a pun on Blaise Pascal's Pensées. "The Noble Englishman" and "Don't Look at Me" were removed from the official edition of Pansies on the grounds of obscenity, which wounded him. Even though he lived most of the last ten years of his life abroad, his thoughts were often still on England. Published in 1930, just eleven days after his death, his last work, Nettles, was a series of bitter, nettling but often wry attacks on the moral climate of England.

O the stale old dogs who pretend to guard
the morals of the masses,
how smelly they make the great back-yard
wetting after everyone that passes.
(From "The Young and Their Moral Guardians")

Two notebooks of Lawrence's unprinted verse were posthumously published as Last Poems and More Pansies. These contain two of Lawrence's most famous poems about death, "Bavarian Gentians" and "The Ship of Death".

=== Literary criticism ===
Lawrence's criticism of other authors often provides insight into his own thinking and writing. Of particular note is his Study of Thomas Hardy and Other Essays. In Studies in Classic American Literature Lawrence's responses to writers like Walt Whitman, Herman Melville and Edgar Allan Poe also shed light on his craft.

=== Plays ===
Lawrence wrote A Collier's Friday Night about 1906–1909, though it was not published until 1939 and not performed until 1965. He wrote The Daughter-in-Law in 1913, though it was not staged until 1967, when it was well received. In 1911 he wrote The Widowing of Mrs. Holroyd, which he revised in 1914; it was staged in the US in 1916 and in the UK in 1920, in an amateur production. It was filmed in 1976; an adaptation was shown on television (BBC 2) in 1995. He also wrote Touch and Go towards the end of World War I, and his last play, David, in 1925.

== Painting ==
D. H. Lawrence had a lifelong interest in painting, which became one of his main forms of expression in his last years. His paintings were exhibited at the Warren Gallery in London's Mayfair in 1929. The exhibition was extremely controversial, with many of the 13,000 people visiting mainly to gawk. The Daily Express claimed, "Fight with an Amazon represents a hideous, bearded man holding a fair-haired woman in his lascivious grip while wolves with dripping jaws look on expectantly, [this] is frankly indecent". However, several artists and art experts praised the paintings. Gwen John, reviewing the exhibition in Everyman, spoke of Lawrence's "stupendous gift of self-expression" and singled out The Finding of Moses, Red Willow Trees and Boccaccio Story as "pictures of real beauty and great vitality". Others singled out Contadini for special praise. After a complaint, the police seized thirteen of the twenty-five paintings, including Boccaccio Story and Contadini. Despite declarations of support from many writers, artists, and members of Parliament, Lawrence was able to recover his paintings only by agreeing never to exhibit them in England again. Years after his death, his widow Frieda asked artist and friend Joseph Glasco to arrange an exhibition of Lawrence's paintings, which he discussed with his gallerist Catherine Viviano. The largest collection of the paintings is now at La Fonda de Taos hotel in Taos, New Mexico. Several others, including Boccaccio Story and Resurrection, are at the Humanities Research Centre of the University of Texas at Austin.

== Lady Chatterley trial ==
A heavily censored abridgement of Lady Chatterley's Lover was published in the United States by Alfred A. Knopf in 1928. This edition was posthumously reissued in paperback in the United States by both Signet Books and Penguin Books in 1946. The first unexpurgated edition of Lady Chatterley's Lover was printed in July 1928 in Florence by a small publisher, Giuseppe Orioli: 1000 copies in a very good print, according D. H. Lawrence, who wrote a thank-you poem to Orioli. When the unexpurgated edition of Lady Chatterley's Lover was published by Penguin Books in Britain in 1960, the trial of Penguin under the Obscene Publications Act of 1959 became a major public event and a test of the new obscenity law. The 1959 act (introduced by Roy Jenkins) had made it possible for publishers to escape conviction if they could show that a work was of literary merit. One of the objections was to the frequent use of the word "fuck" and its derivatives and the word "cunt".

Various academic critics and experts of diverse kinds, including E. M. Forster, Helen Gardner, Richard Hoggart, Raymond Williams and Norman St John-Stevas, were called as witnesses, and the verdict, delivered on 2 November 1960, was "not guilty". This resulted in a far greater degree of freedom for publishing explicit material in the UK. The prosecution was ridiculed for being out of touch with changing social norms when the chief prosecutor, Mervyn Griffith-Jones, asked if it were the kind of book "you would wish your wife or servants to read".

The Penguin second edition, published in 1961, contains a publisher's dedication, which reads: "For having published this book, Penguin Books were prosecuted under the Obscene Publications Act, 1959 at the Old Bailey in London from 20 October to 2 November 1960. This edition is therefore dedicated to the twelve jurors, three women and nine men, who returned a verdict of 'Not Guilty' and thus made D. H. Lawrence's last novel available for the first time to the public in the United Kingdom."

== Philosophy and politics ==
Despite often writing about political, spiritual and philosophical matters, Lawrence was essentially a contrarian by nature and hated to be pigeonholed. Critics such as Terry Eagleton have argued that Lawrence was right-wing due to his lukewarm attitude to democracy, which he intimated would tend towards the levelling down of society and the subordination of the individual to the sensibilities of the "average" man. In his letters to Bertrand Russell around 1915, Lawrence voiced his opposition to enfranchising the working class and his hostility to the burgeoning labour movements, and disparaged the French Revolution, referring to "Liberty, Equality, and Fraternity" as the "three-fanged serpent". Rather than a republic, Lawrence called for an absolute dictator and equivalent dictatrix to lord over the lower peoples. In 1953, recalling his relationship with Lawrence in the First World War, Russell characterised Lawrence as a "proto-German Fascist", saying "I was a firm believer in democracy, whereas he had developed the whole philosophy of Fascism before the politicians had thought of it." Russell felt Lawrence to be a positive force for evil. However, in 1924 Lawrence wrote an epilogue to Movements in European History (a textbook he wrote, originally published in 1921) in which he denounced fascism and Soviet-style socialism as bullying and "a mere worship of Force". Further, he declared "I believe a good form of socialism, if it could be brought about, would be the best form of government." In the late 1920s, he told his sister he would vote Labour if he was living back in England. In general, though, Lawrence disliked any organised groupings, and in his essay Democracy, written in the late twenties, he argued for a new kind of democracy in which

each man shall be spontaneously himself – each man himself, each woman herself, without any question of equality or inequality entering in at all; and that no man shall try to determine the being of any other man, or of any other woman.

Lawrence held seemingly contradictory views on feminism. The evidence of his written works, particularly his earlier novels, indicates a commitment to representing women as strong, independent, and complex; he produced major works in which young, self-directing female characters were central. In his youth he supported extending the vote to women, and he once wrote, "All women in their natures are like giantesses. They will break through everything and go on with their own lives." However, some feminist critics, notably Kate Millett, have criticised, indeed ridiculed, Lawrence's sexual politics, Millett claiming that he uses his female characters as mouthpieces to promote his creed of male supremacy and that his story The Woman Who Rode Away showed Lawrence as a pornographic sadist with its portrayal of "human sacrifice performed upon the woman to the greater glory and potency of the male." Brenda Maddox further highlights this story and two others written around the same time, St. Mawr and The Princess, as "masterworks of misogyny".

Despite the inconsistency and at times inscrutability of his philosophical writings, Lawrence continues to find an audience, and the publication of a new scholarly edition of his letters and writings has demonstrated the range of his achievement. Philosophers like Gilles Deleuze and Félix Guattari found in Lawrence's critique of Sigmund Freud an important precursor of anti-Oedipal accounts of the unconscious that has been much influential.

== Posthumous reputation ==
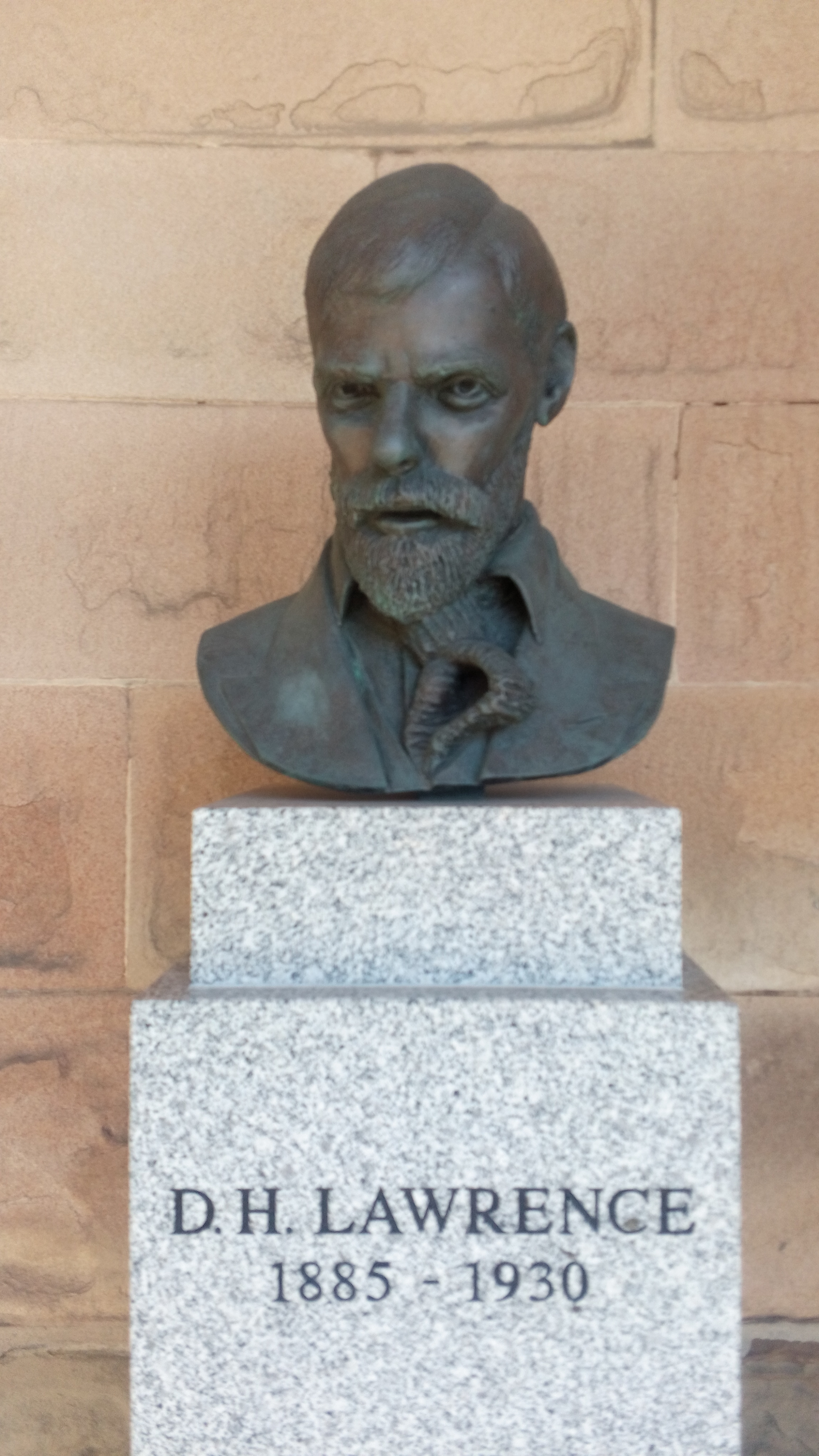
Bust of D. H. Lawrence at Nottingham Castle

The obituaries shortly after Lawrence's death were, with the exception of the one by E. M. Forster, unsympathetic or hostile. However, there were those who articulated a more favourable recognition of the significance of this author's life and works. For example, his long-time friend Catherine Carswell summed up his life in a letter to the periodical Time and Tide published on 16 March 1930. In response to his critics, she wrote:

In the face of formidable initial disadvantages and lifelong delicacy, poverty that lasted for three quarters of his life and hostility that survives his death, he did nothing that he did not really want to do, and all that he most wanted to do he did. He went all over the world, he owned a ranch, he lived in the most beautiful corners of Europe, and met whom he wanted to meet and told them that they were wrong and he was right. He painted and made things, and sang, and rode. He wrote something like three dozen books, of which even the worst page dances with life that could be mistaken for no other man's, while the best are admitted, even by those who hate him, to be unsurpassed. Without vices, with most human virtues, the husband of one wife, scrupulously honest, this estimable citizen yet managed to keep free from the shackles of civilisation and the cant of literary cliques. He would have laughed lightly and cursed venomously in passing at the solemn owls—each one secretly chained by the leg—who now conduct his inquest. To do his work and lead his life in spite of them took some doing, but he did it, and long after they are forgotten, sensitive and innocent people—if any are left—will turn Lawrence's pages and will know from them what sort of a rare man Lawrence was.

Aldous Huxley also defended Lawrence in his introduction to a collection of letters published in 1932. However, the most influential advocate of Lawrence's literary reputation was Cambridge literary critic F. R. Leavis, who asserted that the author had made an important contribution to the tradition of English fiction. Leavis stressed that The Rainbow, Women in Love, and the short stories and tales were major works of art. Later, the obscenity trials over the unexpurgated edition of Lady Chatterley's Lover in America in 1959, and in Britain in 1960, and subsequent publication of the full text, ensured Lawrence's popularity (and notoriety) with a wider public.

Since 2008, an annual D. H. Lawrence Festival has been organised in Eastwood to celebrate Lawrence's life and works; in September 2016, events were held in Cornwall to celebrate the centenary of Lawrence's connection with Zennor.

== Selected film and fictional depictions of Lawrence's life ==
- Priest of Love: a 1981 film based on the non-fiction biography of Lawrence with the same title. It stars Ian McKellen as Lawrence. The film is mostly focused on Lawrence's time in Taos, New Mexico, and Italy, although the source biography covers most of his life.
- Coming Through: a 1985 film about Lawrence and Weekley, portrayed by Kenneth Branagh and Helen Mirren respectively.
- Zennor in Darkness: a 1993 novel by Helen Dunmore in which Lawrence and his wife feature prominently.
- On the Rocks: a 2008 stage play by Amy Rosenthal showing Lawrence, his wife Frieda Lawrence, short-story writer Katherine Mansfield and critic and editor John Middleton Murry in Cornwall in 1916–17.
- Lawrence – Scandalous! Censored! Banned!: A musical based on the life of Lawrence. Winner of the 2009 Marquee Theatre Award for Best Original Musical. Received its London premiere in October 2013 at the Bridewell Theatre.
- Husbands and Sons: A stage play adapted by Ben Power from three of Lawrence's plays, The Daughter-in-Law, A Collier's Friday Night, and The Widowing of Mrs Holroyd, which were each based on Lawrence's formative years in the mining community of Eastwood, Nottinghamshire. Husbands and Sons was co-produced by the National Theater and the Royal Exchange Theater and directed by Marianne Elliott in London in 2015.
- Frieda: The Original Lady Chatterley (Hodder & Stoughton, 2019): a novel by Annabel Abbs.
- Point Counter Point, a novel by Aldous Huxley, features a character named Mark Rampion, who is based on Lawrence.

== Works ==
=== Novels ===
- The White Peacock (1911)
- The Trespasser (1912)
- Sons and Lovers (1913)
- The Rainbow (1915)
- Women in Love (1920)
- The Lost Girl (1920)
- Aaron's Rod (1922)
- Kangaroo (1923)
- The Boy in the Bush (1924), coauthored with M.L. (Mollie or Molly) Skinner
- The Plumed Serpent (1926)
- Lady Chatterley's Lover (1928)
- The Escaped Cock (1929), republished as The Man Who Died

=== Short-story collections ===
- The Prussian Officer and Other Stories (1914)
- England, My England and Other Stories (1922)
- The Complete Short Stories (1922) Three volumes, reissued in 1961 by The Viking Press, Inc.
- The Fox, The Captain's Doll, The Ladybird (1923)
- St Mawr and Other Stories (1925)
- The Woman who Rode Away and Other Stories (1928)
- The Virgin and the Gipsy and Other Stories (1930)
- Love Among the Haystacks and Other Pieces (1930)
- The Lovely Lady and Other Tales (1932)
- The Tales of D.H. Lawrence (1934) – Heinemann
- Collected Stories (1994) – Everyman's Library

=== Collected letters ===
- The Letters of D. H. Lawrence, Volume I, September 1901 – May 1913, ed. James T. Boulton, Cambridge University Press, 1979, ISBN 0-521-22147-1
- The Letters of D. H. Lawrence, Volume II, June 1913 – October 1916, ed. George J. Zytaruk and James T. Boulton, Cambridge University Press, 1981, ISBN 0-521-23111-6
- The Letters of D. H. Lawrence, Volume III, October 1916 – June 1921, ed. James T. Boulton and Andrew Robertson, Cambridge University Press, 1984, ISBN 0-521-23112-4
- The Letters of D. H. Lawrence, Volume IV, June 1921 – March 1924 , ed. Warren Roberts, James T. Boulton and Elizabeth Mansfield, Cambridge University Press, 1987, ISBN 0-521-00695-3
- The Letters of D. H. Lawrence, Volume V, March 1924 – March 1927, ed. James T. Boulton and Lindeth Vasey, Cambridge University Press, 1989, ISBN 0-521-00696-1
- The Letters of D. H. Lawrence, Volume VI, March 1927 – November 1928 , ed. James T. Boulton and Margaret Boulton with Gerald M. Lacy, Cambridge University Press, 1991, ISBN 0-521-00698-8
- The Letters of D. H. Lawrence, Volume VII, November 1928 – February 1930, ed. Keith Sagar and James T. Boulton, Cambridge University Press, 1993, ISBN 0-521-00699-6
- The Letters of D. H. Lawrence, with index, Volume VIII, ed. James T. Boulton, Cambridge University Press, 2001, ISBN 0-521-23117-5
- The Selected Letters of D. H. Lawrence, Compiled and edited by James T. Boulton, Cambridge University Press, 1997, ISBN 0-521-40115-1
- D. H. Lawrence's Letters to Bertrand Russell, edited by Harry T. Moore, New York: Gotham Book Mart, 1948.

=== Poetry collections ===
- Love Poems and others (1913)
- Amores (1916)
- Look! We have come through! (1917)
- New Poems (1918)
- Bay: a book of poems (1919)
- Tortoises (1921)
- Birds, Beasts and Flowers (1923)
- The Collected Poems of D H Lawrence (1928)
- Pansies (1929)
- Nettles (1930)
- The Triumph of the Machine (1930; one of Faber and Faber's Ariel Poems series, illustrated by Althea Willoughby)
- Last Poems (1932)
- Fire and other poems (1940)
- The Complete Poems of D.H. Lawrence (1964), ed. Vivian de Sola Pinto and F. Warren Roberts
- The White Horse (1964)
- D.H. Lawrence: Selected Poems (1972), ed. Keith Sagar.
- Snake and Other Poems

=== Plays ===
- The Daughter-in-Law (1913)
- The Widowing of Mrs. Holroyd (1914)
- Touch and Go (1920)
- David (1926)
- The Fight for Barbara (1933)
- A Collier's Friday Night (1934)
- The Married Man (1940)
- The Merry-Go-Round (1941)
- The Complete Plays of D.H. Lawrence (1965)
- The Plays, edited by Hans-Wilhelm Schwarze and John Worthen, Cambridge University Press, 1999, ISBN 0-521-24277-0

=== Non-fiction books and pamphlets ===
- Study of Thomas Hardy and Other Essays (1914), edited by Bruce Steele, Cambridge University Press, 1985, ISBN 0-521-25252-0, Literary criticism and metaphysics. Study of Thomas Hardy is reprinted in Phoenix.
- Movements in European History (1921), edited by Philip Crumpton, Cambridge University Press, 1989, ISBN 0-521-26201-1, Originally published under the name of Lawrence H. Davison
- Psychoanalysis and the Unconscious and Fantasia of the Unconscious (1921/1922), edited by Bruce Steele, Cambridge University Press, 2004 ISBN 0-521-32791-1
- Studies in Classic American Literature (1923), edited by Ezra Greenspan, Lindeth Vasey and John Worthen, Cambridge University Press, 2003, ISBN 0-521-55016-5
- Reflections on the Death of a Porcupine and Other Essays (1925), edited by Michael Herbert, Cambridge University Press, 1988, ISBN 0-521-26622-X
- My Skirmish With Jolly Roger (1929), Random House – expanded into A Propos of Lady Chatterley's Lover
- A Propos of Lady Chatterley's Lover (1930) – Lawrence wrote this pamphlet to explain his novel. It is reprinted in Phoenix II.
- Apocalypse and the Writings on Revelation (1931), edited by Mara Kalnins, Cambridge University Press, 1980, ISBN 0-521-22407-1
- Phoenix: The Posthumous Papers of D. H. Lawrence (1936)
- Phoenix II: Uncollected, Unpublished, and Other Prose Works by D. H. Lawrence (1968)
- Introductions and Reviews, edited by N. H. Reeve and John Worthen, Cambridge University Press, 2004, ISBN 0-521-83584-4
- Late Essays and Articles, edited by James T. Boulton, Cambridge University Press, 2004, ISBN 0-521-58431-0
- Selected Letters, Oneworld Classics, 2008. Edited by James T. Boulton. ISBN 978-1-84749-049-0
- The New Adelphi, vol. III, no. 4, June–August, 1930, edited by John Middleton Murry. Includes, by Lawrence, "Nottingham and the Mining Countryside," Nine Letters (1918–1919) to Katherine Mansfield, and Selected Passages from non-fiction works. Also includes essays on Lawrence by John Middleton Murry, Rebecca West, Max Plowman, Waldo Frank, and others.
- Memoir of Maurice Magnus, Keith Cushman, ed. 1 December 1987, Black Sparrow Press. ISBN 978-0-87685-716-8, 0-87685-716-0 This book includes the unexpurgated version of Lawrence's introduction to Magnus's Memoirs of the Foreign Legion and related material.

=== Travel books ===
- Twilight in Italy and Other Essays (1916), edited by Paul Eggert, Cambridge University Press, 1994, ISBN 0-521-26888-5. Twilight in Italy paperback reissue, I.B. Tauris, 2015, ISBN 978-1-78076-965-3
- Sea and Sardinia (1921), edited by Mara Kalnins, Cambridge University Press, 1997, ISBN 0-521-24275-4
- Mornings in Mexico and Other Essays (1927), edited by Virginia Crosswhite Hyde, Cambridge University Press, 2009, ISBN 978-0-521-65292-6.
- Sketches of Etruscan Places and Other Italian Essays (1932), edited by Simonetta de Filippis, Cambridge University Press, 1992, ISBN 0-521-25253-9; Etruscan Places, New York: The Viking Press (1932).

=== Works translated by Lawrence ===
- Lev Isaakovich Shestov, All Things are Possible (1920)
- Ivan Alekseyevich Bunin, The Gentleman from San Francisco (1922), tr. with S. S. Koteliansky
- Giovanni Verga, Mastro-don Gesualdo (1923)
- Giovanni Verga, Little Novels of Sicily (1925)
- Giovanni Verga, Cavalleria Rusticana and other stories (1928)
- Antonio Francesco Grazzini (Lasca), The Story of Doctor Manente (1929)

=== Manuscripts and early drafts of works ===
- Paul Morel (1911–12), edited by Helen Baron, Cambridge University Press, 2003 (first publication), ISBN 0-521-56009-8, an early manuscript version of Sons and Lovers
- The First Women in Love (1916–17) edited by John Worthen and Lindeth Vasey, Cambridge University Press, 1998, ISBN 0-521-37326-3
- Mr Noon (unfinished novel) Parts I and II, edited by Lindeth Vasey, Cambridge University Press, 1984, ISBN 0-521-25251-2
- The Symbolic Meaning: The Uncollected Versions of Studies in Classic American Literature, edited by Armin Arnold, Centaur Press, 1962
- Quetzalcoatl (1925), edited by Louis L Martz, W W Norton Edition, 1998, ISBN 0-8112-1385-4, Early draft of The Plumed Serpent
- The First and Second Lady Chatterley Novels, edited by Dieter Mehl and Christa Jansohn, Cambridge University Press, 1999, ISBN 0-521-47116-8.

=== Paintings ===
- The Paintings of D. H. Lawrence, London: Mandrake Press, 1929.
- D. H. Lawrence's Paintings, ed. Keith Sagar, London: Chaucer Press, 2003.
- The Collected Art Works of D. H. Lawrence, ed. Tetsuji Kohno, Tokyo: Sogensha, 2004.
