= Odour of Chrysanthemums =

Short story by D. H. Lawrence

"Odour of Chrysanthemums" is a short story by D. H. Lawrence. It was written in the autumn of 1909 and after revision, was published in The English Review in July 1911. Lawrence later included this tale in his collection entitled The Prussian Officer and Other Stories, which Duckworth, his London publisher, brought out on 26 November 1914. An American edition was produced by B W Huebsch in 1916. Lawrence later adapted the story into the play The Widowing of Mrs. Holroyd.

== Plot ==
The story concerns Elizabeth Bates, a coal miner's wife. She has two children and is pregnant with a third. She angrily waits for her alcoholic husband to come home from the mine, but suspects that he is at the pub getting drunk. Elizabeth's neighbour runs to the pub, but her husband is nowhere to be found; it is later revealed that he died in an accident in the coal mine earlier that day. His fellow workmen return with his body, and as Elizabeth and her mother-in-law prepare him for burial, Elizabeth reflects on her husband and feels that they never really knew each other at all.

== Film ==
In 2002 the story was adapted into a short film by Mark Partridge. The film won first prize at the Milan Film Festival.

== Standard edition ==
- The Prussian Officer and Other Stories (1914), edited by John Worthen, Cambridge University Press, 1983, ISBN 0-521-24822-1
