= Kangaroo (novel) =

1923 novel by D. H. Lawrence

- First edition (publ. Martin Secker)
- Author: D. H. Lawrence
- Language: English
- Publication date: 1923

Kangaroo is a 1923 novel by D. H. Lawrence. It is set in Australia.

== Description ==
Kangaroo is an account of a visit to New South Wales by an English writer named Richard Lovat Somers and his German wife Harriet in the early 1920s. It was written in six and a half weeks during Lawrence and his wife Frieda’s eleven week stay in the NSW coastal town of Thirroul in 1922. The novel includes a chapter ("Nightmare") describing the Somers' experiences in wartime St Ives, Cornwall, vivid descriptions of the Australian landscape, and Richard Somers' sceptical reflections on fringe politics in Sydney. Ultimately, after being initially somewhat drawn to the right-wing Digger movement led by Benjamin Cooley (aka 'Kangaroo') neither it nor the "great general emotion" of Kangaroo himself appeal to Somers. Similarly, Somers rejects the socialism of Willie Struthers, with its emphasis on "generalised love". In this, the novel reflects Lawrence's own response to World War I, as Somers opts “To be clear of love, and pity, and hate. To be alone from it all. To cut himself finally clear from the last encircling arm of the octopus humanity. To turn to the old dark gods, who had waited so long in the outer dark.”

The Oxford Companion to Australian Literature describes Kangaroo as a ‘strongly auto-biographical’ novel: "reflecting the almost daily flow of Lawrence’s thoughts and impressions while in Australia. Richard Somers, the restless hero, is a barely disguised picture of Lawrence, as Harriet, his wife, is of Frieda, and many of the domestic incidents are drawn directly from their Australian experience. Described by Lawrence as a ‘thought-adventure’, the novel's apparent formlessness expresses the flow of Somers's inner life; his attraction to and withdrawal from politics; his European memories; his concern with the fundamental question of authority in marriage, society and politics and with the attractions and dangers of democracy, fascism and socialism."

Bruce Steele, in his explanatory notes for Kangaroo in the Cambridge edition of the Letters and Works of D. H. Lawrence, traces the Fascist allusions in Kangaroo to Lawrence’s 1920-1921 experiences in Italy.

Australian journalist Robert Darroch – in several articles in the late 1970s, the book D. H. Lawrence in Australia (Macmillan, 1981) and the self-published book The Horrible Paws: D. H. Lawrence’s Australian Nightmare (Svengali Press, 2019) – claims that the ‘secret army’ of Diggers featured in Kangaroo must have existed at the time of Lawrence’s arrival in NSW, as Lawrence was a realist writer who depended on personal experience for his material. Darroch posits Major General Sir Charles Rosenthal, a notable NSW World War I leader and co-founder of the NSW branch of the King and Empire League as model for Ben Cooley, and Major John Scott, D.S.O. associate of Rosenthal and 1931 Old Guard recruitment officer, as model for Jack Callcott, the Somers’ neighbour.

Historian, Barbara Kearns, in a centenary review of the novel, contests Darroch’s argument and points out that Lawrence arrived in Sydney with all the material needed to create his ‘thought adventure’. She traces the source of background details for several of Kangaroo’s key characters, to known contacts of Lawrence in Cornwall. She also cites the novel The Black Curtain, by Douglas Goldring, dedicated to Lawrence in 1920, as having had a significant influence on Kangaroo’s plot. In the Black Curtain, as in Kangaroo, the story reaches its dramatic peak when a mob of Diggers storms a socialist meeting.

Historian Joseph Davis in D. H. Lawrence at Thirroul (1989) pointed out it was not possible Lawrence could have had time for secret meetings with political leaders in Sydney, since he was too busy writing his novel in Thirroul, a feat Lawrence accomplished at the average rate of 3,100 words per day.

Davis’ subsequent work D. H. Lawrence and the Mussolini of Austinmer, offers what he calls a “detailed debunking of the myth that D. H. Lawrence ever encountered members of some so-called ‘Old Guard’ in NSW”.

Kangaroo's minor character, James Sharpe is said to have been based on the music critic and composer Cecil Gray.

== Influence and adaptations ==
Kangaroo has influenced Australian historiography to the extent that Historian Andrew Moore - following Darroch - has cited the novel as evidence of a missing link in a continuum of ‘secret counterrevolutionary organisations’ in NSW, between the farmers armies of 1917 and Campbell's 'Old Guard’ of 1931, collectively termed by Moore ‘The Old Guard.’

Kangaroo was partly responsible for inspiring the Jindyworobak movement, an Australian nationalist literary group, that emerged in the 1930s and was committed to the production of Australian writing evoking 'spirit of place', P.R. Stephensen having argued in The foundations of Culture in Australia (1936) that “visitors, such as D. H. Lawrence, have discerned a spiritual quality of ancient loveliness in our land itself.”

Kangaroo was adapted as a film, also called Kangaroo, in 1986, featuring Colin Friels as Somers, Judy Davis as Harriet and Hugh Keays-Byrne as Kangaroo.

Novelist Margaret Barbalet, in her fiction Steel Beach, (Penguin, 1988) imagined what the known-to-have-been-excised pages from the Kangaroo manuscript could have contained, and evoked an extra-marital Lawrentian affair in Thirroul, complete with illegitimate son.

Australian composer Peter Sculthorpe used extracts from the novel in his work for speaker and orchestra, The Fifth Continent (1963). It was recorded in 1963 by Fred Parslow, Melbourne Symphony Orchestra and Thomas Matthews, and then again in 1997 with the composer narrating, accompanied by Tasmanian Symphony Orchestra and David Porcelijn - released on ABC Classics.

Several Australian artists have been inspired by Kangaroo. Sidney Nolan painted 8 canvases in a “D. H. Lawrence, Kangaroo” series. Gary Shead has also produced numerous paintings based on Kangaroo and the period Lawrence spent in Thirroul. Several of these, including “Checkmate” which shows Somers playing chess with Callcott, are in Wollongong Art Gallery.
