= The Lost Girl =

1920 novel by D.H. Lawrence

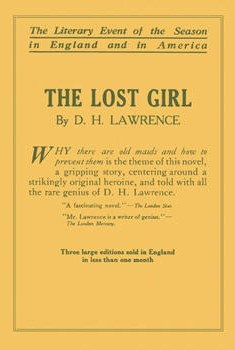
- First US edition
- Author: D. H. Lawrence
- Language: English
- Publisher: Martin Secker (UK); Thomas Seltzer (US)
- Publication date: 1920
- Publication place: United Kingdom
- Media type: Print (Hardcover, Paperback)
- Pages: 371
- OCLC: 432428229
- Dewey Decimal: 823/.912 19
- LC Class: PR6023.A93 L62 1981
- Preceded by: Women in Love
- Followed by: Aaron's Rod

The Lost Girl is a novel by D. H. Lawrence, first published in 1920. It was awarded the 1920 James Tait Black Memorial Prize in the fiction category. Lawrence started it shortly after writing Women in Love, and worked on it only sporadically until he completed it in 1920.

== Synopsis ==
Alvina Houghton, the daughter of a widowed Midlands draper, comes of age just as her father’s business is failing. In a desperate attempt to regain his fortune and secure his daughter’s proper upbringing, James Houghton buys a theatre. Among the travelling performers he employs is Cicio, a sensual Italian who immediately captures Alvina’s attention. Fleeing with him to the impoverished Neapolitan countryside, she leaves her safe world behind and enters one of sexual awakening, desire, and fleeting freedom.

== Editions ==
- The Lost Girl (1920), edited by John Worthen, pub. Cambridge University Press, 1981, ISBN 0-521-22263-X.
- The Lost Girl, pub. New York: Thomas Seltzer, 1921. Online edition at Google Books. Snippet view, United States Only.
