= Sketches of Etruscan Places and Other Italian Essays =

Collection of travel writings by D. H. Lawrence

First US edition (publ. Viking, 1932)

Sketches of Etruscan Places and other Italian Essays, or Etruscan Places, is a collection of travel writings by D. H. Lawrence, first published posthumously in 1932. In this book Lawrence contrasted the life-affirming world of the Etruscans with the shabbiness of Benito Mussolini's Italy during the late 1920s.

In preparing these essays, Lawrence travelled through the countryside of Tuscany with his friend Earl Brewster during the spring of 1927.

The first U.S. edition, published by the Viking Press in 1932 and titled Etruscan Places, states, "A portion of this material originally appeared in Travel, and was copyrighted (1927) by Robert M. McBride & Company, Inc."

The volume published in 1932 included the following essays:

- Cerveteri
- Tarquinia
- The Painted Tombs of Tarquinia 1
- The Painted Tombs of Tarquinia 2
- Vulci
- Volterra
- The Florence Museum
