= Sons and Lovers =

1913 novel by DH Lawrence

- Author: D. H. Lawrence
- Language: English
- Genre: Autobiographical novel
- Publisher: Gerald Duckworth and Company Ltd
- Publication date: 1913
- Publication place: United Kingdom
- Pages: 423
- Preceded by: The Trespasser
- Followed by: The Rainbow
- Text: Sons and Lovers at Wikisource

Sons and Lovers is a 1913 novel by the English writer D. H. Lawrence. It traces emotional conflicts through the protagonist, Paul Morel, and his suffocating relationships with a demanding mother and two very different lovers, which exert complex influences on the development of his manhood. The novel was originally published by Gerald Duckworth and Company Ltd., London, and Mitchell Kennerley Publishers, New York. While the novel initially received a mediocre reception, along with allegations of obscenity, it is today considered a masterpiece by many critics and is often regarded as Lawrence's finest achievement. It goes into detail about Lawrence's life and his phases. His first phase was in 1910 when he lost his mother, to whom he was particularly attached. He met Frieda Richthofen during that time. Also, he began conceiving his other two novels, The Rainbow and Women in Love, which had more sexual emphasis and maturity.

== Title ==
Lawrence rewrote the work four times until he was happy with it. Although the work was usually titled Paul Morel before publication, Lawrence finally settled on Sons and Lovers.

== Synopsis ==
=== Part I ===
The refined daughter of a "good old burgher family", Gertrude Coppard meets a rough-hewn miner, Walter Morel, at a Christmas dance and falls into a whirlwind romance characterised by physical passion, but soon after her marriage to Walter, she realizes the difficulties of living off his inadequate salary in a rented house. The couple fight and drift apart, and Walter retreats to the pub after work each day. Mrs. Morel's affections gradually shift to her sons beginning with the oldest, William.

As a boy, William is so attached to his mother that he does not enjoy the fair without her. As he grows older, he defends her against his father's occasional violence. He eventually leaves their Nottinghamshire home for a job in London, where he begins to rise up into the middle class. He gets engaged, but he detests his fiancée's superficiality. William dies, and Mrs. Morel is heartbroken. When her second son, Paul, catches pneumonia, she rediscovers her love for him.

=== Part II ===
Both repulsed by and drawn to his mother, Paul is afraid to leave her, but wants to go out on his own, and needs to experience love. He gradually falls into a relationship with Miriam, a farmer's daughter who attends his church. The two take long walks and have intellectual conversations about books, but Paul resists, in part because his mother disapproves. At Miriam's family's farm, Paul meets Clara Dawes, a young woman with feminist sympathies who has separated from her husband, Baxter.

After pressuring Miriam into a physical relationship, which he finds unsatisfying, Paul breaks up with her as he becomes closer with Clara, who is more passionate physically. Even she cannot hold him however, and he returns to his mother. When his mother dies soon after, he is alone.

=== In Lawrence's own words ===
Lawrence summarised the plot in a letter to Edward Garnett on 19 November 1912:

It follows this idea: a woman of character and refinement goes into the lower class, and has no satisfaction in her own life. She has had a passion for her husband, so her children are born of passion, and have heaps of vitality. But as her sons grow up she selects them as lovers – first the eldest, then the second. These sons are urged into life by their reciprocal love of their mother – urged on and on. But when they come to manhood, they can't love, because their mother is the strongest power in their lives, and holds them. It's rather like Goethe and his mother and Frau von Stein and Christiana – As soon as the young men come into contact with women, there's a split. William gives his sex to a fritter, and his mother holds his soul. But the split kills him, because he doesn't know where he is. The next son gets a woman who fights for his soul – fights his mother. The son loves his mother – all the sons hate and are jealous of the father. The conflict goes on between the mother and the girl with the son as object. The mother gradually proves stronger, because of the ties of blood. The son decides to leave his soul in his mother's hands, and, like his elder brother, go for passion. He gets passion. Then the split begins to tell again. But, almost unconsciously, the mother realises what is the matter, and begins to die. The son casts off his mistress, attends to his mother dying. He is left in the end naked of everything, with the drift towards death.

== Development and publication history ==
The third published novel of D. H. Lawrence, said by many to be his earliest masterpiece, tells the story of Paul Morel, a young man and budding artist.

The original 1913 edition was heavily edited by Edward Garnett who removed 80 passages, roughly a tenth of the text. The novel is dedicated to Garnett. Garnett, as the literary advisor to the publishing firm Duckworth, was an important figure in leading Lawrence further into the London literary world during the years 1911 and 1912. It was not until the 1992 Cambridge University Press edition was released that the missing text was restored.

Lawrence began working on the novel in the time of his mother's illness, and often expresses this sense of his mother's wasted life through his female protagonist Gertrude Morel. Letters written around the time of its development clearly demonstrate the admiration he felt for his mother, viewing her as a 'clever, ironical, delicately moulded woman', and her unfortunate marriage to his coal-miner father, a man of 'sanguine temperament' and instability. He believed his mother had married below her class status. Unlike her husband, Lydia grew up in a middle class religious family, and the differences in their backgrounds often caused family conflicts. On one hand, Mr. Lawrence would spend his wages on alcohol after working for hours in the coal mine. On the other hand, Mrs. Lawrence focused on their children's upbringing, welfare, and education while also harbouring a desire to open her own haberdashery shop. This personal family conflict experienced by Lawrence provided him with the impetus for the first half of his novel where William, the older brother, and Paul Morel become increasingly contemptuous of their father and the subsequent exploration of Paul Morel's antagonising relationships with each of his lovers, which are both incessantly affected by his allegiance to his mother.

The first draft of Lawrence's novel is now lost and was never completed, which seems to be directly due to his mother's illness. He did not return to the novel for three months, at which point it was titled 'Paul Morel'. The penultimate draft of the novel coincided with a remarkable change in Lawrence's life, as his health was thrown into turmoil and he resigned his teaching job to spend time in Germany. This plan was never followed, however, as he met and married the German minor aristocrat, Frieda Weekley, who was the wife of a former professor of his at the University of Nottingham. According to Frieda's account of their first encounter, she and Lawrence talked about Oedipus and the effects of early childhood on later life within twenty minutes of meeting.

The third draft of 'Paul Morel' was sent to the publishing house Heinemann; the response, a rather violent reaction, came from William Heinemann himself. His reaction captures the shock and freshness of Lawrence's novel, 'the degradation of the mother [as explored in this novel], supposed to be of gentler birth, is almost inconceivable'; he encouraged Lawrence to redraft the novel one more time. In addition to altering the title to a more thematic 'Sons and Lovers', Heinemann's response had reinvigorated Lawrence into vehemently defending his novel and its themes as a coherent work of art. To justify its form, Lawrence explains, in letters to Garnett, that it is a 'great tragedy' and a 'great book', one which mirrors the 'tragedy of thousands of young men in England'.

== Literary significance and criticism ==
In 1999, the Modern Library ranked Sons and Lovers ninth on a list of the 100 best novels in English of the 20th century.

The novel contains a frequently quoted use of the English dialect word "nesh". The speech of several protagonists is represented in Lawrence's written interpretation of the Nottinghamshire dialect, which also features in some of his poems.

== Film, TV and theatrical adaptations ==
Sons and Lovers has been adapted for the screen several times including the Academy Award winning 1960 film, a 1981 BBC TV serial and another on ITV1 in 2003. The 2003 serial has been issued on DVD by Acorn Media UK.

== Standard editions ==
- Baron, Helen; Baron, Carl, eds. (1992) [1913]. Sons and Lovers. Cambridge University Press. ISBN 0-521-24276-2.
- Baron, Helen, ed. (2003) [1911]. Paul Morel. Cambridge University Press. ISBN 0-521-56009-8. "An early manuscript version of Sons and Lovers"

== Sources ==
- Black, Michael (1986). D. H. Lawrence: The Early Fiction. Palgrave MacMillan. ISBN 978-0521322935.
- Black, Michael (1992). Sons and Lovers. Landmarks of World Literature. Cambridge University Press. ISBN 978-0521369244.
- Jeffers, Thomas L. (2005). Apprenticeships: The Bildungsroman from Goethe to Santayana. New York: Palgrave. pp. 135–158. ISBN 978-1403966070.
