= England, My England and Other Stories =

Collection of short stories by D. H. Lawrence

- First edition (US)
- Publisher: Thomas Seltzer
- Publication date: October 24, 1922
- Pages: 280

England, My England is a collection of short stories by D. H. Lawrence. Individual items were originally written between 1913 and 1921, many of them against the background of World War I. Most of these versions were placed in magazines or periodicals. Ten were later selected and extensively revised by Lawrence for the England, My England volume. This was published on 24 October 1922 by Thomas Seltzer in the United States. The first United Kingdom edition was published by Martin Secker in 1924.

== Contents ==
The stories were all written and revised between July 1913 and January 1922. The only story not previously published is "The Primrose Path".

- "England, My England", written June 1915. (The English Review. October, 1915.)
- "Tickets, Please", November 1918. (The Strand Magazine. April, 1919.)
- "The Blind Man", December 1918. (The English Review. July, 1920.)
- "Monkey Nuts", May 1919. (Sovereign Magazine. August, 1922)
- "Wintry Peacock", January 1919. (Metropolitan. August, 1921)
- "You Touched Me", July 1919. (Land and Water. April, 1920)
- "Samson and Delilah", November 1916. (The English Review. March, 1917).
- "The Primrose Path", July 1913.
- "The Horse Dealer's Daughter", January 1917. (The English Review. April, 1922)
- "Fanny And Annie", May 1919. (Hutchinson's Story Magazine. November, 1921)

== Synopsis ==
=== Wintry Peacock ===
The short story "Wintry Peacock" tells the story of an Englishwoman who has been left with her husband's parents for the duration of the war. Shortly before her husband's return, there is a letter addressed to her husband written in French. She asks a man she sees in passing to translate it, and although the letter details that her husband had an affair with a young woman while away at war, and that this woman had recently delivered a baby by him and plans to come to England, the man translating tells the woman instead that the baby is the young girl's newborn brother and that her parents named the child after the soldier for having protected their family during the war. That evening the man finds the woman's peacock in the cold and takes it in, returning it the following day to find that the husband has returned. When asked in private what the letter had said, the letter having since been burnt according to his wife, the translator tells the husband both what the letter said, leaving out that the woman and her child are coming to England, and tells him also what he told his wife. The husband laughs and jokingly berates the man for bringing the peacock home and suggests that, although his wife loves it very much, he will perhaps kill it. The two both laugh, seemingly at the misfortune of both the wife and the mistress, although the translator may be laughing as well at the husband himself.

=== You Touched Me ===
"You Touched Me" tells the story of a young boy who is adopted by a family that is without any male children. The mother having died, and one sister having been married off, two sisters remain with the father and raise the boy, although the boy is reluctant to embrace the education and lifestyle offered him and opts to leave for Canada. When war breaks out the boy returns as a young man and spends time with the patriarch of the house who is close to death. The sisters believe the young man is in search of a legacy, but when the elder sister mistakenly brushes her hand against the young man, thinking that it is her father in the dark of her father's bedroom, the young man asks the father for the daughter's hand in marriage, even though she is old enough to be his mother. Both daughters are opposed to the proposition and assume the young man is doing this in hopes of inheriting money (although the boy admits to himself alone that this is only part of the reason, as he wants both the money and the daughter). The father redrafts his will, stating that his entire legacy will go to the young man if his daughter refuses to marry him. The daughter eventually gives in and while on his death bed the father demands to watch his elder daughter kiss the young man as if asserting his will over his daughter.

=== Samson and Delilah ===
"Samson and Delilah" details the narrative of a woman whose husband had abandoned both her and her newborn child to go mining for gold, only to return unannounced some fifteen years later to the lodging where his wife serves as a landlady. Although she at firsts denies being his wife, she eventually admits to it, but only after having soldiers staying at her lodgings tie up her husband and leave him outside. He breaks free from the rope restraining him, and re-enters the lodgings, finding his wife sitting by the warmth of a fire. He takes a seat next to her and admits to his wrongdoing, but asks her to take him back, telling her that he has returned with a thousand pounds to his name.

=== The Primrose Path ===
"The Primrose Path" tells of the youngest sibling of a family, considered to be a black sheep of sorts, who leaves his first wife for a young woman who later, according to him, poisons him. He jumps around from England to Australia and back, where he finally settles in as a taxi-cab driver and takes up with a young woman, living with both her and her mother. A nephew of his reconnects with him and tells him that his first wife is dying of consumption, and on her deathbed asks that he takes their remaining daughter (the elder of their two daughters was given to a wealthy aunt). He agrees and then returns to his girlfriend's home with his nephew to share dinner. At the end of the narrative it is stated that the young girl will leave him, suggesting the fleeting nature of the life he has chosen.

=== The Horse Dealer's Daughter ===
Mable Pervin and her three brothers gather as their father's estate is sold to cover his debts. She is despondent at the loss of status and purpose. After cleaning her mother's gravestone, she attempts suicide in a nearby pond. The local doctor saves her and brings her back to the house. As he warms her by the fire, Mabel is convinced of his love. The doctor is repulsed but succumbs to her.

== Reception ==
England, My England has been described as a fragmentary novel. D.H. Lawrence used that term to describe Ernest Hemingway's In Our Time.

"The Horse Dealer's Daughter" typifies the kind of narrative rhythm E. M. Forster described in Aspects of the Novel. The story moves from death to life as the doctor and Mabel are the agents of each other's rebirth.
