= Mr Noon =

1981 novel by D. H. Lawrence

- Cover of the first edition
- Author: D. H. Lawrence
- Language: English
- Genre: Autobiographical novel
- Publisher: Cambridge University Press
- Publication date: 1934 (as part of A Modern Lover); 1984 (complete publication)
- Publication place: United Kingdom
- Media type: Print (Hardcover and Paperback)
- Pages: 418 (1984 Cambridge University Press edition)
- ISBN: 978-0521252515

Mr Noon is an unfinished novel by the English writer D. H. Lawrence. It appears to have been drafted in 1920 and 1921 and then abandoned by the author. It consists of two parts.

The first part was published posthumously by Secker as a long short story in the 1934 volume A Modern Lover. This fragment was reissued in 1968 in the Phoenix II collection of Lawrence's assorted writings. It is set in the East Midlands, where the author was born and spent his youth. The second fragment "effectively disappeared for about 50 years and then [was] bought by the University of Texas in 1972". It was finally published along with the introductory section in 1984 and describes the experiences of the main character during his elopement to the continent.

The book is characterised by a flippant, sarcastic tone as Lawrence reflects on the sexual behaviour and attitudes of provincial men and women in the period before the First World War.

== Reception ==
The biographer Brenda Maddox writes that Mr Noon provides a new perspective on D. H. Lawrence's relationship with Frieda Lawrence, and that "the novel's second half appears to be a factually accurate and barely fictionalized account of Lawrence and Frieda's early sexual relations." According to Maddox, the critic Diana Trilling viewed the book as "biographical fact" and "was so shocked by its revelations of Frieda's casual promiscuity that she accused Lawrence of artistic dishonesty".

== Standard edition ==
- Mr Noon - Parts I and II, edited by Lindeth Vasey, Cambridge University Press, 1984, ISBN 0-521-25251-2
