= The Virgin and the Gypsy =

1930 novella by D.H. Lawrence

First UK edition (publ. Martin Secker, 1930)

The Virgin and the Gipsy is a 1930 novella by English author D. H. Lawrence. It was written in 1926 and published posthumously in 1930. Today it is often entitled The Virgin and the Gypsy which can lead to confusion because first and early editions had the spelling "Gipsy".

== Synopsis ==
The tale relates the story of two sisters, daughters of an Anglican vicar, who return from finishing school overseas to a drab, lifeless rectory in the East Midlands, not long after the World War I. Their mother has run off with another man, a scandal that is not talked about by the family, especially the girls' father, who was deeply humiliated and only remembers his wife as she was when they first met many years before.

Their new home is dominated by a blind and selfish grandmother called "Mater" and her mean-spirited, poisonous daughter Aunt Cissie; there is also Uncle Fred, who lives a solitary life. The young women, Yvette and Lucille, risk being suffocated by the life they now lead at the rectory. In particular, Yvette's desperation is compounded by the fact that she has "borrowed" a little money from a charity fund that her family manages. Her relationship with both her father and aunt suffer: She sees her father as a mean-spirited and cowardly person for the first time when he reacts savagely to her petty crime.

But even so, the girls try their utmost every day to bring colour and fun into their lives. They go on outings with the Framleys, their neighbourhood friends. On one such outing, Yvette encounters a gipsy man and his family. She and the other girls have their fortunes told by the gipsy man's wife, a magnetic and strong woman who seems to see easily through them. The gipsy man also sees deeply into Yvette and the impression he makes on her this first time is unforgettable. This first meeting reinforces her disenchantment with the oppressive domesticity of the rectory. It also awakens in her a sexual curiosity she has not felt or thought much about before despite her having admirers.

While on a second visit to the gipsy family, she befriends a married Jewish woman who has left her husband and who is now living with her paramour, impatiently waiting for her divorce to come through. Yvette does not pass judgment on anyone new she meets, neither the gipsy nor the Jewish woman, because she is young and modern-minded. But when her father finds out about this friendship, he threatens her with "the asylum", and Yvette realizes that, at his heart, her father too is mean-spirited, bigoted, provincial and shallow. Apparently, her father believes that one cannot associate with a wealthy divorced woman who is merely marrying a handsome man, who happens to be a war hero, as an excuse to dump her first and older husband.

The novel has a surprise twist at the end. A huge flood surges through the vale, coming from a burst dam at a nearby reservoir. It just so happens that the gipsy man is approaching the rectory house. Nobody is at home but Yvette and her blind grandmother. In the nick of time, the brave gipsy man rescues Yvette despite the fact that the surprise flood washes most of the rectory away, drowning the grandmother.

A moving scene ensues as the gipsy hero breathes life and warmth back into the virginal Yvette, who feels the powerful attraction of his manhood and strength. She falls asleep and the gipsy disappears. Her family returns home to find her safe, and they adulate the gipsy as her savior.

One day she receives a brief note from the gipsy, "hoping to see her again" and it is only here that both reader and Yvette learn his name is Joe Boswell.

The reader knows that Yvette's feeling and understanding for life is changed forever.

== Themes ==
The story is a romance of blossoming spirit. The character of young Yvette contains the spirit of youthful unrest, curiosity, free-thinking and unprejudiced innocence. Yvette represents the desire for experience and freedom that Lawrence recognized as dominating the imaginations of the younger generation in England. The theme of aspiration for authentic experience is carried by her rebellious attitude and is further developed in her natural attraction to the gipsy man. Her day-to-day experience and the responses of her family are intended to contrast the inexperience and desires of youth with the limitations imposed by the strictures of conventional society.

Social propriety for its own sake, a propriety that imposes inhibitions and crushes the possibilities of genuine free-thinking and loving experience, is one of the main enemies in Lawrence's work. Even Mrs. Fawcett is shocked at the notion Yvette could be attracted by the gipsy despite the fact that she herself is living with a younger man even before her divorce has come through.

The gipsy represents male sexuality as well as individual freedom. The theme of virginity, and its almost unconscious aspiration for experience, is synonymous with the collective desires for the entire society before it has been perverted by an education made of prejudice and inhibitions. The virgin is inexperienced, and is therefore purely free to see the world as it is before others have had time to cause damage. Lawrence portrays Yvette as unrestrained in a positive sense: She visits the gipsies and the unmarried couple without thinking about any social consequences. She has an innate curiosity for an interesting and genuine life. The themes of her purity and innocence equate closely with a being absolutely untainted by prejudices or judgment. At home, the stifling environment created by her Aunt Cissie and the indolent, annoying Mater drive Yvette to search for uncharted social waters. She is not ashamed of her response to nature when she confesses her strong attraction to the gipsy during conversations with her sister Lucille as well as Mrs. Fawcett and Mr. Eastwood.

Another theme is that society is influenced heavily by ignorance, jealousy and fear. Lawrence saw himself as a liberator for people who needed to enjoy and experience life without fear or shame.

The only resolution for the virgin and her gipsy that Lawrence could allow in this story was an act of God. The flood brings the gipsy to Yvette's doorstep in time for him to save Yvette's life. Chilled by the water, his warming touch soothes and saves her from an icy death.

Other themes in this story include the intrinsic value of human life. The gipsy is a war hero, and seemingly, a gentleman. But none of this matters to polite society, which would condemn him even for setting his eyes on the young society girl. So, the gypsy remains nameless until the end of the tale, once he has proven himself the hero again, having saved Yvette's life. His namelessness represents the traditional social inferiority of the gipsy in English society. With no way inside society, he is an unimportant creature to everyone except Yvette. The gipsy is not granted recognition by anyone except Yvette until the end of the novel.

Another significant idea that Lawrence wants to convey is the transference of character and spirit from the “dominant gene” of one parent to the offspring. In Yvette's case, she is like the reincarnation of her mother's rebellious nature as she yearns for freedom; and, like her mother, she seems heedless of the wants of her peers. Her carelessness equates with the way in which her mother abandoned the family years before. Lawrence suggests that, despite attempts to understand life or defy fate, the individual always will be guided by the form of our ancestors and their particular character.

== Media adaptations ==
A film adaptation was made in 1970, directed by Christopher Miles from a screenplay by Alan Plater starring Imogen Hassall, Joanna Shimkus, Franco Nero, Honor Blackman, Mark Burns and Fay Compton. The work was broadcast as a radio play on BBC Radio 4 on 29 July 2017 at 21:00.
