= The Rainbow =

1915 novel by D. H. Lawrence

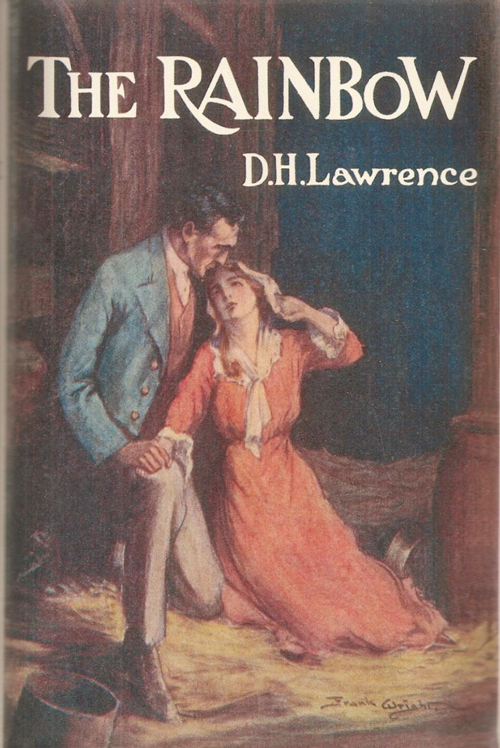
- Front cover of the first British edition
- Author: D. H. Lawrence
- Cover artist: Frank Wright
- Language: English
- Genre: Novel, family saga
- Set in: East Midlands, 1840s–1905
- Publisher: Methuen & Co.
- Publication date: 1915
- Publication place: United Kingdom
- Media type: Print
- Pages: 464
- Dewey Decimal: 823.912
- Preceded by: Sons and Lovers
- Followed by: Women in Love
- Text: The Rainbow at Wikisource

The Rainbow is a novel by English author D. H. Lawrence, first published by Methuen & Co. in 1915. It follows three generations of the Brangwen family living in Nottinghamshire, focusing particularly on the individual's struggle for growth and fulfilment within the confining structures of English social life. Lawrence's 1920 novel Women in Love is a sequel to The Rainbow.

== Plot ==
The Rainbow tells the story of three generations of the Brangwen family, a dynasty of farmers and craftsmen who live around the Erewash Valley, on the borders of Nottinghamshire and Derbyshire. The book spans a period of roughly 65 years from the 1840s to 1905, and shows how the love relationships of the Brangwens change against the backdrop of the increasing industrialisation of Britain. The first central character, Tom Brangwen, is a farmer whose experience of the world does not stretch beyond these two counties; while the last, Ursula, his granddaughter, studies at university and becomes a teacher in the progressively urbanised, capitalist and industrial world.

The book starts with a description of the Brangwen dynasty, then deals with how Tom Brangwen, one of several brothers, fell in love with a Polish refugee and widow, Lydia. The next part of the book deals with Lydia's daughter by her first husband, Anna, and her destructive, battle-driven relationship with her husband, Will, the son of one of Tom's brothers. The last and most extended part of the book, and also probably the most famous, then deals with Will and Anna's daughter, Ursula, and her struggle to find fulfilment for her passionate, spiritual, and sensual nature against the confines of the increasingly materialist and conformist society around her. She experiences a same-sex relationship with a teacher, and a passionate but ultimately doomed love affair with Anton Skrebensky, a British soldier of Polish ancestry. At the end of the book, having failed to find her fulfilment in Skrebensky, she has a vision of a rainbow towering over the Earth, promising a new dawn for humanity:

"She saw in the rainbow the earth's new architecture, the old, brittle corruption of houses and factories swept away, the world built up in a living fabric of Truth, fitting to the over-arching heaven."

== Censorship ==
Lawrence's frank treatment of sexual desire, and the part it plays within relationships as a natural and even spiritual force of life, caused The Rainbow to be prosecuted in an obscenity trial at Bow Street Magistrates' Court on 13 November 1915, as a result of which 1,011 copies were seized and burnt. After this ban, it became unavailable in Britain for 11 years, although editions were available in the United States.

== Sequel ==
The Rainbow was followed by a sequel in 1920, Women in Love. Although Lawrence conceived of the two novels as one, considering the titles The Sisters and The Wedding Ring for the work, they were published as two separate novels at the urging of his publisher. However, after the negative public reception of The Rainbow, Lawrence's publisher opted out of publishing the sequel.

Ursula's spiritual and emotional quest continues in Women in Love, in which she continues to be a main character. This second work follows her into a relationship with Rupert Birkin (often seen as a self-portrait by Lawrence), and follows her sister Gudrun's parallel relationship with Birkin's friend, Gerald Crich.

== Reception ==
The philosopher Roger Scruton argues in Sexual Desire (1986) that "because we live in a world structured by gender, the other sex is forever to some extent a mystery to us, with a dimension of experience that we can imagine but never inwardly know." Scruton believes that the prevailing theme of Lawrence's novels is that "In desiring to unite with [the other sex], we are desiring to mingle with something that is deeply – perhaps essentially – not ourselves, and which brings us to experience a character and inwardness that challenge us with their strangeness." Scruton believes that The Rainbow vindicates Lawrence's vision. In 1999, the Modern Library ranked The Rainbow forty-eighth on a list of the 100 best novels in English of the 20th century.

== Adaptations ==
In 1988, the BBC produced a television adaptation directed by Stuart Burge, with Imogen Stubbs in the role of Ursula Brangwen. The following year, the novel was adapted into the UK film The Rainbow, directed by Ken Russell, who had also directed the 1969 film adaptation Women in Love.

In 2021, BBC produced a new two-part radio adaptation of the novel, aired on Radio 4 and starring Cassie Bradley in the role of Ursula and Karl Collins as Tom.

== Cultural Reference ==
In the fourth episode of the second season of the television series, The Son, the adolescent Jeannie McCullough is seen reading The Rainbow, before assaulting a boy that had maligned her father. The Son is also trigenerational, but the McCullough family live on the Texas-Mexico border, rather than along the Erewash Valley. The fictional Brangwens and McCulloughs are roughly contemporary, with the third generation growing up in the shadow of a fossil-fuel industry before this specific event's 1916 setting.
