= The Plumed Serpent =

1926 novel by D. H. Lawrence

- Cover of the first edition
- Author: D. H. Lawrence
- Language: English
- Genre: Political fiction Romance novel Mythological fiction
- Publisher: Martin Secker
- Publication date: January 1926 March 1926 (reprint)
- Publication place: United Kingdom
- Media type: Print (Hardcover and Paperback)
- Pages: 445 (Vintage international edition)
- ISBN: 0-679-73493-7 (Vintage international edition)

The Plumed Serpent is a "political, mythological, and romance novel" by D. H. Lawrence, set in Mexico and published in 1926.

== See also ==
- Fascism
- Mornings in Mexico
- Polytheistic reconstructionism
