= St Mawr =

1925 novella by D. H. Lawrence

- First US edition (publ. Knopf, 1925)
- Author: D. H. Lawrence
- Language: English
- Publication date: 1925

St Mawr is a novella written by D. H. Lawrence. It was first published in 1925.

The heroine of the story, Lou Witt, abandons her sterile marriage and a brittle, cynical post-First World War England. Her sense of alienation is associated with her encounter with a high-spirited stallion, the eponymous St Mawr. She eventually settles in a remote ranch set high in the mountains of New Mexico, near Taos.

The inspiration for the novel came from Lawrence seeing a magnificent bay stallion while staying during January 1924 in the village of Pontesbury, Shropshire, while visiting a writing friend Frederick Carter.

Lawrence wrote most of this brief novel whilst spending five months of the summer of 1924 at what is now known as the D. H. Lawrence Ranch, a property which he and wife, Frieda, acquired from Mabel Dodge Luhan earlier that year.

St Mawr first appeared in St Mawr and Other Stories which, in addition to the novella, consists of two short stories 'The Overtone' and 'The Princess', and two unfinished stories 'The Wilful Woman' and 'The Flying Fish'. All these works were written during Lawrence's stay in America between 1922 and 1925.

== Standard edition ==
- St Mawr and other stories (1925), edited by Brian Finney, Cambridge University Press, 1983, ISBN 0-521-22265-6
