= James Boulton =

British literary scholar

James Thompson Boulton, FBA (17 February 1924 – 18 July 2013) was a British academic. He was a leading scholar of eighteenth-century literature and of D. H. Lawrence.
