= The Fox (novella) =

1922 novella by D. H. Lawrence

The Fox is a novella by D. H. Lawrence which first appeared in The Dial in 1922. Set in Berkshire, England, during World War I, The Fox, like many of D. H. Lawrence's other major works, deals with the psychological relationships of three protagonists in a triangle of love and hatred. Without the help of any male laborers, Nellie March and Jill Banford struggle to maintain a marginal livelihood at the Bailey Farm. A fox has raged through the poultry, and although the women—particularly the more masculine Nellie—have tried to shoot the intruder, he seems always to elude traps or gunshot.

== Plot introduction ==
Banford and March live on a farm together because it does not look like they will marry. Although they are only in their late twenties, in that era women who were still single at their age were generally considered to have forgone the prospect of marriage. Banford is thin and frail, in contrast to her companion who is physically masculine. However particular emphasis is given to March's face, which is feminine and expressive. The women are depicted as fearful of femininity and fertility. For example, they sell a heifer before it calves.

The fox becomes a hindrance to Banford and March, but March finds she cannot hunt it, and rather, she becomes entranced by it. Shortly after this, Henry, a young man, comes to stay with the women, and a link is established between the fox and Henry.

This intriguing novella explores gender roles, sexuality, femininity, and the pity of war, as do two other Lawrence novellas written at the same time, The Ladybird and The Captain's Doll.

== Film adaptation ==
A 1967 film was made from The Fox, starring Sandy Dennis as Jill Banford, Anne Heywood as Ellen March, and Keir Dullea as Paul (not Henry) Grenfield.
