= John Worthen (literary critic) =

English academic

John Worthen (born June 1943) taught at universities in North America and Wales before becoming Professor of D. H. Lawrence Studies at the University of Nottingham, where he remains Emeritus Professor. His inaugural lecture as Professor of D. H. Lawrence Studies was published under the title Cold Hearts and Coronets. His career as Lawrence’s biographer began in the 1980s and culminated in the celebrated D. H. Lawrence: The Early Years 1885–1912, the first part of the definitive three-volume Cambridge biography (Cambridge University Press, 1991–98). Material from this project later formed the foundation of Worthen's single-volume study, D. H. Lawrence: The Life of an Outsider (2005).

Though based in Lawrence’s hometown of Nottingham, he has researched and travelled around the world to complete this portrait of the writer. In 2001 he published a group biography of the Wordsworth-Coleridge circle, The Gang: Coleridge, the Hutchinsons, and the Wordsworths in 1802; in 2007 he published a life of the musician Robert Schumann and since then has completed a short biography of T.S. Eliot (2009), an Introduction to Samuel Taylor Coleridge for Cambridge University Press (2011), a volume of unpublished lectures on D. H. Lawrence entitled Experiments (2012), a biography of William Wordsworth (2014), and a biography of Percy Bysshe Shelley (2019). A short book, Shelley Drowns (2019), covers Shelley's last days; his first novel, 'Young Frieda', offers a two-part fictional development of the lives of Ernest Weekley and Frieda Lawrence. In 2022 followed his first book of history, following up an interest lasting over the previous fifty years: 'Regicide: The Trials of Henry Marten' describes for the first time the life of Marten.

In addition to this biographical work, Worthen has edited or co-edited seven individual volumes in The Cambridge Edition of the Letters and Works of D. H. Lawrence series and is a member of the editorial board of the edition.
