= 1970 in art =

Events from the year 1970 in art

== Events ==
- January 16 – John Lennon's exhibition of Bag One at the London Arts Gallery is shut down by Scotland Yard for displaying "erotic lithographs".
- March 2–29 - Melvin Edwards: Works, a solo exhibition by American artist Melvin Edwards at New York's Whitney Museum, the first solo show by an African-American sculptor in the museum's history.
- October - In celebration of her large gift of art works (including ones by Gauguin, Mary Cassatt, and Picasso, ) to the DeYoung Museum in San Francisco from the collection assembled by her late husband Thomas Edward Hanley, Tullah Hanley throws an epic party with rock bands, nude participants, exotic dancers (including herself), live animals and various other musical acts.
- October 26 – Garry Trudeau's comic strip Doonesbury debuts in approximately two dozen newspapers in the United States.
- November 27 – Bolivian artist Benjamin Mendoza tries to assassinate Pope Paul VI during his visit to Manila.
- Tom Keating admits that a number of watercolours in the style of Samuel Palmer were painted by him.
- Sammlung zeitgenössischer Kunst der Bundesrepublik Deutschland, the Federal collection of contemporary art, is established in Germany.
- Contemporary Art Museum of Macedonia in Skopje, designed by the "Warsaw Tigers" (Wacław Kłyszewski, Jerzy Mokrzyński and Eugeniusz Wierzbicki), is built.
- Conceptual Art and Conceptual Aspects, the first dedicated conceptual art exhibition, is mounted at the New York Cultural Center.
- Theodor W. Adorno's book Aesthetic Theory (Asthetische Theorie) is published posthumously in Germany.

== Exhibitions ==
- February 10 until March 29 - 22 Realists (William Bailey, Jack Beal, Robert Bechtle, Howard Bruder, John Clem Clarke, Chuck Close, Arthur Elias, Richard Estes, Audrey Flack, Maxwell Hendler, Richard Joseph, Howard Kanovitz, Gabriel Laderman, Alfred Leslie, Richard McLean, Malcolm Morley, Philip Pearlstein, Donald Perlis, Paul Staiger, Sidney Tillim, Paul Wiesenfeld, and Donald James Wynn) at the Whitney Museum of American Art in New York City.
- March 2 until March 29 - Melvin Edwards: Works at the Whitney Museum of American Art in New york City (curated by Robert M. Doty),

== Awards ==
- Archibald Prize: Eric Smith – Gruzman – Architect
- Prix Puvis de Chavannes – Daniel du Janerand

== Works ==
- Gilbert and George – The Singing Sculpture (performance)
- Barbara Hepworth – Family of Man
- Alvin D. Loving Jr. – Cube 27 (Museum of Fine Arts, Boston)
- Brice Marden - For Pearl
- Henry Moore – Reclining Figure LH608
- Kanda Nissho – Indoor Landscape
- Isamu Noguchi – Night Wind
- Victor Pasmore – Apollo Pavilion (Peterlee, England)
- William Scott – Still Life With Orange Note (Arts Council of Northern Ireland)
- Aaron Shikler – Official portrait of President John F. Kennedy
- Robert Smithson – Spiral Jetty
- Peter Stämpfli - M301 In All Its' Glory
- Wayne Thiebaud - Pop Bottles

== Births ==
- January 22 – Alex Ross, American comic book painter and illustrator
- January 24 – Maria Balshaw, English curator
- February 10 – Peter Richards, British artist and curator
- February 15 – Shepard Fairey, American artist, graphic designer and illustrator
- February 27 – Matthias Lechner, German set designer and art director
- March 12 – Marine Delterme, French actress, painter, sculptor and model
- May 3 – Jeffrey Sebelia, American fashion designer
- May 9 – Damian Loeb, American painter
- May 26 – Nobuhiro Watsuki, Japanese manga artist
- June 1 – Joshua Compston, British gallerist (d.1996)
- July 6 – Grant Bond, American comic book artist and writer
- July 9 – Benoit Pierre Emery, French art director and fashion designer
- August 4 – Pete Abrams, American webcomic writer and illustrator
- August 23 – Ben Eine, née Flynn, English street artist
- November 22 – Aleksander Balos, Polish-born American artist and figurative painter
- date unknown
  - Helen Cammock, English artist
  - Stéphane Ducret, Swiss contemporary artist
  - Emily Jacir, Palestinian artist
  - Tomoki Kyoda, Japanese animation director and animator
  - Vincent Paronnaud, French comics artist and filmmaker
  - David Quinn, Irish artist
  - Bosco Sodi, Mexican-born abstract painter

== Deaths ==
- January 27
  - Rita Angus, New Zealand painter (born 1908)
  - Erich Heckel, German painter and printmaker (born 1883)
- February 25 – Mark Rothko, Latvian-born American painter and printmaker (born 1903)
- February 26 – Ángel María de Rosa, Argentine sculptor and philanthropist (born 1888)
- March 2 – Marc-Aurèle Fortin, Canadian painter (born 1888)
- March 8
  - Waldo Peirce, American painter (born 1884)
  - Anton Räderscheidt, German painter (born 1892)
- March 22 – Georges Malkine, French Surrealist painter (born 1898)
- April 20 – Robert Laurent, American sculptor (born 1890)
- April 29 – Charles R. Chickering, American illustrator (born 1891)
- May 13 – William Dobell, Australian sculptor and painter (born 1899)
- May 29 – Eva Hesse, German-born American sculptor (born 1936)
- May 31 - Clare Sheridan, English sculptor and author (born 1885)
- June 3 - Roberto Longhi, Italian art historian curator (born 1890)
- June 6
  - Camille Bombois, French naïve painter (born 1883)
  - Signe Hammarsten-Jansson, Swedish-Finnish graphic artist (born 1882)
- June 15 – Almada Negreiros, Portuguese artist (born 1893)
- June 27 – Edwin La Dell, British artist (born 1914)
- July 4 – Barnett Newman, American artist (born 1905)
- July 7 – Dame Laura Knight, English Impressionist painter (born 1877)
- July 13 – Lazar Drljača, Serbian painter (born 1883)
- July 30 – Maud Lewis, Canadian folk artist (born 1903)
- November 29 - Walter Stuempfig, American painter (born 1914)
- December 1 – Hermine David, French painter (born 1886)
- December 19 – Stig Blomberg, Swedish sculptor (born 1901)
- date unknown – Ze'ev Raban, Israeli painter (born 1890)

== See also ==
- 1970 in fine arts of the Soviet Union
