= Priest of Love =

1981 British film by Christopher Miles

- Theatrical film poster
- Directed by: Christopher Miles
- Written by: Alan Plater; Harry T. Moore (biography)
- Produced by: Christopher Miles; Andrew Donally
- Starring: Ian McKellen; Janet Suzman; Ava Gardner; Penelope Keith; Jorge Rivero; John Gielgud; Maurizio Merli; James Faulkner; Massimo Ranieri; Graham Faulkner
- Cinematography: Ted Moore B.S.C
- Edited by: Paul Davies; Ann Chegwidden
- Music by: Joseph James
- Production companies: Milesian Films with Ronceval Inc; Filmways Pictures (U.S.)
- Release dates: 11 October 1981; 8 November 1985
- Running time: 98 minutes
- Country: United Kingdom
- Languages: English, German, Spanish, Italian

Priest of Love is a 1981 British biographical film about D. H. Lawrence and his wife Frieda (née Von Richthofen) played by Ian McKellen and Janet Suzman. It was a Stanley J. Seeger presentation, produced and directed by Christopher Miles and co-produced by Andrew Donally. The screenplay was by Alan Plater from the biography The Priest of Love by Harry T. Moore. The music score was by Francis James Brown and Stanley J. Seeger, credited jointly as "Joseph James".

The film was first released by Filmways in New York on 11 October 1981 and then by Enterprise Pictures Ltd in London with a Royal Premiere on 18 February 1982.

The film was then re-cut in 1985 by the director for the centenary of D. H. Lawrence's birth, and was re-released in cinemas by Enterprise Pictures to greater commercial and critical success. All copies of the 1981 original version were legally withdrawn and are no longer available. The world rights are now owned by Milesian Lion and distributed by Screenbound International Pictures.

This 1985 Centenary Version was then remastered in 2011 for a new DVD release in the United States (Kino International – standard DVD and Blu-ray) and in the UK (Odeon Entertainment – standard DVD, 2012). The extras on both DVDs include interviews with Ian McKellen and Christopher Miles, and Penelope Keith narrates "The Way We Got It Together", on the making of the film.

== Plot ==
At the start of the Great War in 1914, Lawrence and his new wife Frieda are living a bohemian life in rural Cornwall. There is great hostility towards Frieda because she is a German, and Lawrence feels persecuted by the authorities, who claim his books are obscene. A year later on 13 November 1915, 1,011 copies of his book The Rainbow were seized for obscenity by the censor Herbert G. Muskett and burnt in front of the Royal Exchange in the city of London. At the same time, following the invitation of the wealthy American art patroness Mabel Dodge Luhan, Lawrence, Frieda and their loyal friend, the Hon. Dorothy Brett, leave for New Mexico. There, Lawrence reluctantly accepts an old ranch from Mabel in exchange for the manuscript of Sons and Lovers, while Brett continues to work on her painting and typing out Lawrence’s novels.

Frieda tells Mabel the story of her romance with Lawrence. Although Frieda is from an old German aristocratic family and has left her husband and children behind in England in order to elope with Lawrence, she firmly believes she is the right woman for the man she affectionally calls "Lorenzo" and considers a literary giant. Lawrence bluntly tells her before the start of their life as a couple: "There will be no fear, but there will be pain".

Always looking for new material, the Lawrences and Brett head further south to Oaxaca in Mexico, where Lawrence's fascination for the ancient Mayan "Dark Gods" cannot hide his health problems from Frieda, who insists on taking him to Mexico City to see a good doctor. The prognosis is bad: he has tuberculosis and is given a year or two at the most. Frieda crumbles at this terrible news, and they return to England.

Back in Lawrence's native Nottingham, the couple revisit the places of his childhood, which had so influenced his early writing; Lawrence exclaims: “Twenty-eight books and still no peace...”. Lawrence's restless search for both peace and inspiration, and for sunnier lands to ease his tuberculosis, drives them to take up their travels once more and return to Italy, where they lived once.

The couple move to Tuscany and rent the top floors of an old villa. Lawrence, who had been suffering from a long and tormented fallow period as a writer, finds inspiration once more. He resumes his work to write again what is to become his most controversial novel, Lady Chatterley’s Lover. Lawrence confides in Frieda that the description of the protagonist's feelings was based on Frieda's: "Since I met you, every woman I’ve ever written about has been you. And a little bit about me", he tells her. The years in Tuscany become Lawrence's final period of great creativity, and in between writing he also finds time to paint using the canvasses Aldous and Maria Huxley left behind.

Lawrence finds an Italian printer for Lady Chattersley's Lover who lives nearby in Florence and, predictably, when the published book arrives in London it's quickly labeled obscene, and banned by the authorities. An exhibition of Lawrence's paintings is later mounted in a London gallery, and Frieda travels to England "to protect them" as she explains to Lawrence. The exhibition draws huge crowds, but Lawrence's old nemesis Herbert G. Muskett, the public censor who has been responsible for the banning and burning of so much of his works, steps in and has the gallery raided by the police. Frieda telegraphs the news to Lawrence, who suffers a debilitating fit of coughing and is moved to a sanitarium near Nice.

On Frieda's return to France, she is upset to find Lawrence so weak. He begs her to move him from the sanitarium and "find a house" for his final days. This she does, along with friends and family who nurse and implicitly say goodbye to Lawrence. As the end approaches, Frieda urges Lawrence to let go and find in death the peace that so eluded him in life.

After his death and burial, Lawrence appears in a flashback, writing in a letter: "I shall always be a priest of love. And a glad one".

== Cast ==
- Ian McKellen as D. H. Lawrence
- Janet Suzman as Frieda Lawrence
- Penelope Keith as Dorothy Brett
- Ava Gardner as Mabel Dodge Luhan
- Jorge Rivero as Tony Luhan
- John Gielgud as Herbert G. Muskett
- Maurizio Merli as Angelo Ravagli
- James Faulkner as Aldous Huxley
- Mike Gwilym as John Middleton Murry
- Massimo Ranieri as Piero Pini
- Elio Pandolfi as Giuseppe Orioli
- Adrienne Burgess as Katherine Mansfield
- Jane Booker as Frieda's daughter Barbara Weekley Barr
- Julian Fellowes as Barbara Weekley Barr's fiancé
- Patrick Holt as Arthur Lawrence
- Niall Padden as British Soldier
- Andrew McCulloch as British Sergeant
- Adrienne Burgess as Katherine Mansfield
- Gareth Forwood as Photographer on Aquitania
- Andrew Lodge as British Officer
- Daniel Chatto as Aquitania Officer
- John Hudson as Clerk to Herbert G. Muskett
- Elizabeth Spender as Elsa Weekley
- Shane Rimmer as Chief Immigration Officer
- Burnell Tucker as Earl Brewster
- Roger Sloman as Simon The English Reporter

== Production ==
In 1972, Christopher Miles wanted to make a biographical film about a writer who wouldn't compromise, D.H. Lawrence, and met the writer's agent, Laurence Pollinger, who was then still alive. However, in order to quote from the writer's many novels, poems and letters in the film, Pollinger's huge asking price was more "Lawrence of Arabia" than "Lawrence of Nottingham" so Miles dropped the idea.

Five years later, Pollinger's son Gerald, contacted Miles asking if he was still interested and suggested a meeting with Professor Harry Moore to discuss his biography The Priest of Love, this time more reasonable deals were discussed, and Miles commissioned a screenplay from Alan Plater, whom he had worked with on The Virgin and the Gypsy.

Casting and finance were the next hurdles. Miles had always wanted Suzman for Frieda Lawrence, as she represented for him the life force of the woman behind the great man, but the casting of Lawrence was more problematic. The first financier, a German film investor and producer, wanted other actors for the two main roles, but Miles rejected them. Although McKellen's film career had been minimal up to then, Miles went to see him in a play and was convinced he'd make a good Lawrence. The big US studios were unwilling to proceed; nor were any of the UK producers. In the meantime a couple of friends whom Miles had approached for a musical theme for the film asked about progress.

Hearing it was going badly, one of the composers, Stanley Seeger, asked Miles to see his solicitor and discuss the project. From that moment, Miles was able to cast the film as he wished, as Seeger had just come into an oil inheritance and decided to finance the production. Miles felt that McKellen not only had the talent and looks, but the vibrant irascible humour of Lawrence, and McKellen delightedly accepted the role, after which Ava Gardner accepted the role of Mabel Dodge Luhan, the wealthy art patroness. Miles decided from then on to cast actors who resembled the real people in the script, as there were too many portraits and photographs of the main protagonists and their friends to ignore the public's expectations. So he was glad Penelope Keith agreed to play the Hon. Dorothy Brett, and John Gielgud, who had worked with Miles previously, to play Herbert G. Muskett, the formidable British censor, who loathed Lawrence and all he stood for.

Through his Italian co-producers, Miles also found good look-a-like Italian actors for Angelo Ravagli and the local gamekeeper, who resembled the portrait Lawrence painted of him later, and while in Italy, Miles was amazed to see how little the Villa Mirenda, near Florence, had changed since Lawrence's day. During the shooting, an old retainer at the villa cried out "Lorenzo!" on seeing McKellen, who felt as if he had been applauded. Both he and Suzman said that filming in the place where Lady Chatterley's Lover was actually written gave a frisson lacking on a film set. The superb location also helped inspire the director and crew.

Other locations where the Lawrences lived were found in Cornwall, London, Nottingham, France, New and old Mexico and their beloved Italy. Some interiors were filmed at Shepperton Studios for a total ten-week shoot, which came in on schedule and on budget.

== 1985 re-release ==
The two main reasons for re-cutting were that Miles and Seeger were soon aware that although the film had gone down fairly well, however at 125 minutes it needed shortening, and there were also complaints about the Shepperton soundtrack, which needed remixing.

The fact that scenes in the film actually happened in reality, such as Lawrence meeting a film star on his boat to Capri, or the Zapotec prophesies on his health at the temple of Mitla, are interesting, but their inclusion destroyed the film’s emotional narrative drive. The same often applied to flashbacks, which were changed to their correct chronological order.

The soundtrack was remixed by Dean Humphreys, and the film restoration was supervised by John Pegg.

The present - and now only - cut of 98 minutes has gone down better, and as Miles told Phillip Bergson in a ‘What’s On’ Cinema Interview: “It was good to come back to the film after the dust had settled and re-edit this version for Lawrence’s centenary. I put back a couple of scenes, and tightened others. I reckon we should all leave a film for a while and look at it afresh later... if we can”.

== 1985 critical reception ==
Dilys Powell, film critic of The Sunday Times, was a defence witness for Penguin in R v Penguin Books Ltd (the "Lady Chatterley" trial) in 1960. She wrote this review for Punch on seeing the film a second time: "With astonished delight one finds, watching a film which when seen four years ago seemed indeed reputable, but not really equal to its subject, that now shows itself a work of deep understanding and devotion.... [D]irected by Christopher Miles, the film has been re-shaped since its first appearance. There are small additions but it is the cutting which has effected the transformation. "Priest of Love" now concentrates on Lawrence's life with his wife (played by Janet Suzman with a strength not as clear in 1982) ... and the writer played by Ian McKellen is a figure at once powerful and heart-rending — he loves, hates, jokes and works. Mr Miles had the persistence to find even the Italian villa where they lived. The landscapes are suffused with light and life...and the people are beautifully alive Ava Gardner (Mabel Dodge Luhan) Penelope Keith (Brett) and John Gielgud... the film leads up to the publication of Lady Chatterley’s Lover a book of heroic quality, but probably the least successful of his novels ... the errors of genius are in the bones of genius. If one is an admirer, one must accept them. Mr Miles's film rightly urges one to thankfully accept Lady Chatterley’s Lover".

The Daily Telegraph wrote, "Can a film, only slightly faulted, be redeemed by re-editing?... it certainly has happened now ... with some new material by Mr Miles to give a shorter, sharper, more chronological account.... [A]s a result the emphasis falls strongly on the relations between Frieda and Lawrence, so illustrating what he tried to convey in his major works". and The Times thought the film was "Honourable and absorbing, with vivid, rounded, warty characterisations of Lawrence and Frieda by Ian McKellen and Janet Suzman, and creditable support by Ava Gardner, John Gielgud and Penelope Keith".

DVD Savant review thought that "Priest of Love" deserves a major reevaluation about the last years of "notorious author D. H. Lawrence and is a welcome surprise, an intelligent and engaging look at the writer.... Ian McKellen gives one of the best portrayals of a writer I've seen, while Janet Suzman is riveting as his courageous wife. Christopher Miles has a firm handle on all aspects of the production ... without turning it into a travelogue. Alan Plater's fine screenplay presents Lawrence as a temperamental man with little patience for conventional people, even the eccentric Mabel Luhan (one of the few Ava Gardner late-career roles that are worth seeing).... The film does not exploit its subject, a major cultural sensation of the 1920s. Kino International new Blu-ray makes the 30-year-old picture look brand new.

Peter Martin of Twitch wrote, "It feels like being tossed into the deep end of a man's soul, but McKellen proves to be a solid anchor and has made a smooth transition to a leading role in this film. He's matched in his fiery nature by his wife Frieda (Janet Suzman). It's rare nowadays to see two middle-aged people portrayed as a loving couple on the big screen. Director Miles does not shy away from the carnal component of their relationship ... but it never strays into exploitation territory. The Blu-ray from Kino International looks absolutely impeccable. Miles conducts a relaxed informal interview with McKellen filled with fond remembrances and even telling the director which scenes he didn't like in the finished film, and why. Priest of Love paints an intriguing portrait of an artist who was underappreciated in his time.
