= Ernest Weekley =

British philologist (1865–1954)

Weekley in 1935

Ernest Weekley (27 April 1865 – 7 May 1954) was a British philologist, best known as the author of a number of works on etymology. His An Etymological Dictionary of Modern English (1921; 850 pages) has been cited as a source by most authors of similar books over the 90 years since it was published. From 1898 to 1938, he was Professor of Modern Languages at the University of Nottingham.

He married Frieda von Richthofen in 1899. Together they had three children: Charles Montague (born 1900), Elsa Agnès (born 1902) and Barbara Joy (born 1904). Weekley divorced Frieda in 1913 following her elopement with D. H. Lawrence. Following the divorce Frieda and Lawrence married in 1914. She had been legally obliged to leave her children with Weekley because divorced adulterous women were unable to gain custody. Frieda had an affair with Angelo Ravagli during the last four years of Lawrence's life.

Frieda's life and relationships with Weekley and Lawrence are thought to be the inspiration behind Lawrence's renowned novel, Lady Chatterley's Lover, as described by Annabel Abbs in her biographical novel, Frieda: The Original Lady Chatterley (Two Roads, 2021).

== Selected bibliography ==
- The Romance of Words (1912; and subsequent editions in 1913 (2nd), 1917 (3rd), 1922 (4th) and 1928 (5th))
- The Romance of Names (1914; and subsequent editions in 1914 (2nd), 1922 (3rd) and 1928 (4th))
  - 1914 edition, apparently first edition at the Internet Archive
- Surnames (1916) and subsequent editions in 1917 (2nd) and 1936 (3rd)
- A Concise Etymological Dictionary of Modern English (1924)
- Words Ancient and Modern (1926)
- More Words Ancient and Modern (1927)
- Adjectives — and other words (1930)
- Words and Names (1932)
- Something about words (1935)
- Jack and Jill. A Study in Our Christian Names (1939)
- Words Ancient and Modern (new combined ed.) (1946)
