= Andrew Waterman (poet) =

English poet (1940–2022)

Andrew Waterman (1940–2022) was an English poet.

== Biography ==
Born in London, Waterman grew up in Woodside and Croydon, and at the age of eleven won a scholarship to the Trinity School of John Whitgift. He left before sitting his A levels, and after six years of clerical and manual jobs in London and Jersey began studying English at the University of Leicester as a mature student, graduating in 1966. With the help of poet G. S. Fraser, Waterman was then awarded funding to conduct postgraduate research at Worcester College, Oxford, although he stayed there only briefly and did not graduate. From 1968 to 1997, he lectured in English Literature at the University of Ulster, Coleraine, and in 1998 retired to Norfolk. In "Ulsterectomy", Waterman commented on how writers who happened to have been born in Northern Ireland are claimed for that nationality, ignoring their other cultural influences. He received a Cholmondeley Award for poets. From 1990, he was registered blind, though in practice was partially sighted. His son is the poet Rory Waterman.

== Books ==
Poetry

- Living Room (Marvell Press, 1974)
- From the Other Country (Carcanet Press, 1977)
- Over the Wall (Carcanet, 1980)
- The Poetry of Chess (ed.) (Anvil Press Poetry, 1981)
- Out for the Elements (Carcanet, 1981)
- Selected Poems (Carcanet, 1986)
- In the Planetarium (Carcanet, 1990)
- The End of the Pier Show (Carcanet, 1995)
- Collected Poems (Carcanet, 2000)
- The Captain's Swallow (Carcanet, 2007)
- By the River Wensum (Shoestring Press, 2014)

Anthologies including Andrew Waterman

- The Wearing of the Black, ed. Padraic Fiacc (Blackstaff Press, 1974)
- Modern Poets Five, ed. Jim Hunter (Faber and Faber, 1981)
- Some Contemporary Poets of Britain and Ireland, ed. Michael Schmidt (Carcanet, 1983)
- Poems in Focus, ed. Christopher Martin (Oxford University Press, 1985)
- The London Magazine 1961–1985, a selection from 25 years of the magazine, ed. Alan Ross (Chatto & Windus, 1986)
- Post-War British Poets, ed. Dannie Abse (Hutchinson 1989)
- Elected Friends: Poems for and about Edward Thomas, ed. Anne Harvey (Enitharmon Press, 1991)
- A Rage for Order: Poetry of the Northern Ireland Troubles, ed. Frank Ormsby (Blackstaff Press, 1992)
- Earth Songs: An Anthology of Contemporary Eco-Poetry, ed. Peter Abbs (Green Books/Resurgence, 2002)

Waterman has also written a considerable amount of critical prose.
