= The House of Breath =

1950 novel by William Goyen

- First edition
- Author: William Goyen
- Language: English
- Genre: Semi-autobiographical novel
- Publisher: Random House
- Publication date: 1950
- Publication place: United States
- Media type: Print
- Pages: 181 pp
- ISBN: 978-0-8101-5067-6 (TriQuarterly Books/Northwestern University Press, Fiftieth Anniversary Edition)
- Followed by: Ghost and Flesh: Stories and Tales

The House of Breath is a novel written by the American author William Goyen. It was his first book, published in 1950. It is not a novel in the usual sense in that it lacks traditional plot and character development. Upon its publication, reviewers noted the book for its unusual literary technique and style. Goyen called it a series of “arias”. Some critics have called it not a novel at all but a work to be read as poetry, over and over. The book touches on themes of family (kinship), human sexuality, place, time, and memory. It received critical acclaim upon its publication, not commercial success, but it did lead the way for support of the author’s further work through fellowships.

== Background ==
Goyen began to sketch parts of the novel during World War II, when he served on the aircraft carrier USS Casablanca. After the war he and Navy friend Walter Berns moved to Taos, New Mexico, where they lived near benefactor Frieda Lawrence (widow of D.H. Lawrence) to pursue writing. Publications of several short stories followed, and Goyen was awarded the Southwest Review Literary Fellowship in 1949, which supported his continuing work on the book. It is an autobiographical work, but not in the sense that people might usually think of autobiography. Goyen once remarked, “Everything is auto-biography for me.”

== Origin of book title ==
In an interview with The Paris Review in 1976 (on the occasion of the publication of the book’s Twenty-fifth Anniversary Edition), Goyen relates how he happened upon the title. He was serving on an aircraft carrier during World War II at the time:

Suddenly—it was out on a deck in the cold—I saw the breath that came from me. And I thought that the simplest thing that I know is what I belong to and where I came from and I just called out to my family as I stood there that night, and it just . . . I saw this breath come from me and I thought—in that breath, in that call, is "their" existence, is their reality . . . and I must shape that and I must write about them—"The House of Breath".

Alternate titles Goyen considered were Cries Down a Well, Six Elegies, and Six American Portraits.

== Book summary ==
Two epigraphs open the book. The first is from a character in the book, Aunt Malley Ganchion: “What kin are we all to each other, anyway?” The second is the famous quote from French poet Rimbaud: “JE est un autre.” Literally translated, it means “I is another.” Goyen scholar Reginald Gibbons noted this “has the effect of alerting the reader in advance to the multiplicity of selves who narrate the book, all of them also in some sense the author-narrator “Goyen.”” Davis interprets both thus:

Kinship juxtaposed to otherness. The character from within the novel, Aunt Malley, poses the broad and basic question of William Goyen's writing: What is kinship? What do we owe to other people as relatives, as human beings? What is the basis and nature of our obligations, our debts? This questioning makes room for gestures such as Rimbaud's (or rather Goyen’s as he ventriloquizes this separation). And so the capitalized and insistent "I" (JE) calls out its strangeness, a sense of distance already implied in the shadow of the porch, the precarious umbrella, already waiting in kinship, its shadowy trace.

The book is narrated by several people, most notably a man returning after a long absence to his abandoned family home in Charity, Texas; other characters in the man’s family narrate their own sections, as do inanimate objects (a river, the wind, the woods). The text does not adhere to the usual structure of a novel: there is no “plot” to develop, and characters and events are explored deeply as moments of life are recalled. The book is thus composed of linked accounts of people who lived in the town, loosely connected by the first-person narrator. “The focus of the novel is the leaving and returning of the self-exiled “children” of Charity—the interrelatedness of people and place.”

== Main characters ==
- The main narrator of the book can be read as being both Boy Ganchion (nephew of Follie and Christy Ganchion) and Ben Berryben Ganchion (son of Malley Ganchion, and thus also a nephew of both Follie and Christy Ganchion). Boy and Ben are distinct characters, but in a few passages their identities seem to overlap.
- Granny Ganchion is the family matriarch, the mother of daughters Lauralee and Malley and sons Follie and Christy.
- Folner ‘Follie’ Ganchion, a son of Granny Ganchion, runs away from home with a trapeze artist after experiencing a "sensual revelation". He is openly effeminate.
- Christy Ganchion, older brother of Follie by 14 years, was born from a one-night stand with a traveling circus performer.

== Themes ==
Primary themes of the book include family (kinship), time, memory, sexuality, place and the identity it brings, and the Christ figure. The book is noted for being “a meditation on the nature of identity and origins, memory, and time’s annihilation of life.” Some later scholars have focused on the book’s treatment of male homosexuality.

== Critical response and reception ==
The House of Breath was received with critical success and puzzlement. Critics appreciated Goyen’s lyric and evocative prose but at the same time did not think it always worked in the author’s favor. Goyen’s family and the people in Trinity, Texas were troubled by what appeared to be the book’s disturbing autobiographical look at a “fictional” family in a “fictional” East Texas town.

In her New York Times review, writer Katherine Anne Porter (best known for her novel Ship of Fools) wrote: “The House of Breath is not a well-made novel, indeed it is not a novel at all but a sustained evocation of the past….” But she concludes her review: “the writing as a whole is disciplined on a high plane, and there are long passages of the best writing, the fullest and richest and most expressive, that I have read in a very long time—complex in form, and beautifully organized…”

A review in Harper’s Magazine noted:

Some will label its style confused, pretentious, neo-Thomas Wolfe with homosexual overtones. To others it will seem poetic magic of the most poignant beauty and intensity. Here is unquestionably a new and remarkable talent and a book which can be read, like poetry, over and over for deeper meanings and unexpected flashes of insight.

Well-known literary critic Northrop Frye wrote at the time that it was “a remarkable book.” Another reviewer called the book “absorbing” and “moving.”

The publication of the book brought some literary fame to Goyen, both in New York and in Texas. He would later recall that he felt that “everyone he met in the literary world wanted a piece of him, wanted to admire him as the moment’s fashion, and yet at the same time he felt that others were angry at him for his moment of public recognition.” He would also recall later that he was “just about disinherited” by his family after the book’s publication, and “fell out of favor with many people” in his home town.

Later critics have addressed the book’s exploration and presentation of male homosexuality.

== Literary technique and style ==
Various critics and reviewers have called the style that the book is written in as abstract, psychological, lyrical, poetic, surreal, experimental, mythic, and fantastic. Goyen scholar Reginald Gibbons stated that the work “pondered the problem of how to think about the past, about the life of feeling that one had had in the past…”

Of the form his book takes, Goyen stated in an interview:

The form of that novel is the way it was written. It was slow, although it poured from me and a whole lot of it was simply given to me, absolutely put into my mouth. There were great stretches when nothing came. Then it poured out . . . in pieces, if that’s possible. So I thought of it as fragments . . . that was what established its form.

Goyen recalled afterwards that the book was “like a series of related ‘’arias’’…” Gibbons said that, with The House of Breath, “Goyen invented a new form of the novel.”

== Publication history ==
Most of the final text was published in magazines before the entire novel was first published in 1950. It was a critical but not commercial success, and soon fell out of print. However, in 1952 the book was translated in Germany by Ernst Robert Curtius (who also translated T.S. Eliot's The Waste Land) and Elizabeth Schnack and in France by Maurice Edgar Coindreau (William Faulkner's translator). Goyen’s work enjoyed more success in Europe than in America, and the book never went out of print there.

In 1975 in the U.S., the book was reprinted as a Twenty-fifth Anniversary Edition, with a brief introductory note from the author, and “with changes that downplayed the novel’s erotic charge.” In 2000, TriQuarterly Books (Northwestern University Press) printed the original version, as a Fiftieth Anniversary Edition, with an afterword by Reginald Gibbons, former editor of TriQuarterly magazine and Goyen scholar.

== Adaptation ==
Goyen adapted the book into a play of the same name, published in 1956. In 1971 he adapted the book into a play titled House of Breath Black/White. Trinity Square Repertory Company (Providence, Rhode Island) staged this adaptation, in which three characters were duplicated by black and white actors.

== Honors ==
In the year of its first edition, The House of Breath won the MacMurray Award for best first novel by a Texan. The book was also nominated for the first National Book Award for Fiction. An excerpt from the book, “Her Breath on the Windowpane,” was selected for publication in The Best American Short Stories 1950. In 1952, when the French translation was published, it won the French Halperin-Kaminsky Prize.
