= Dorothy Brett =

American painter (1883–1977)

- Born: Dorothy Eugénie Brett; October 11, 1883; London, England
- Died: August 27, 1977 (aged 93); Taos, New Mexico, U.S.
- Education: Slade School of Art
- Known for: Painting
- Father: Reginald Brett, 2nd Viscount Esher

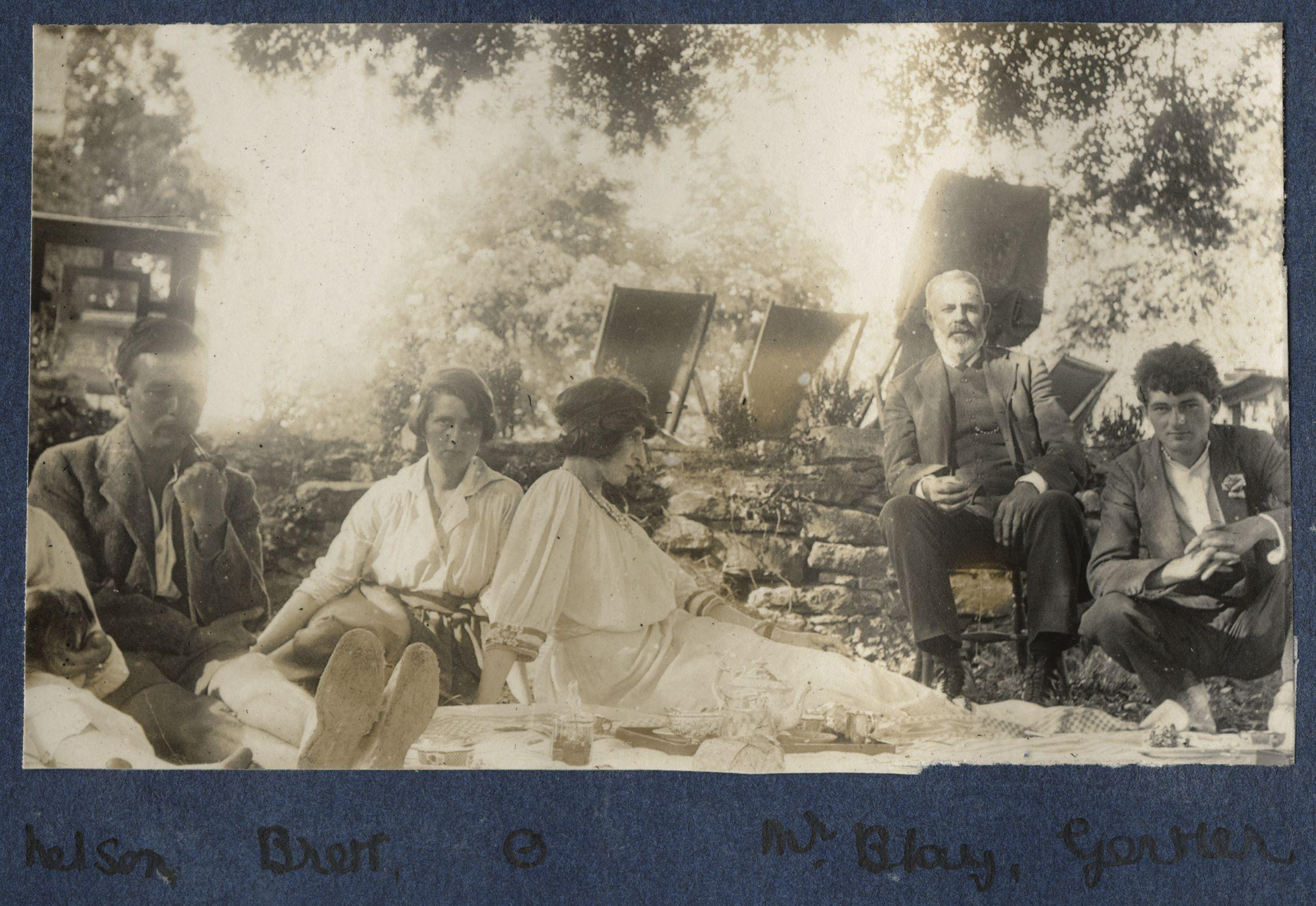
Brett (second from left) with Lady Ottoline Morrell, Mark Gertler and other companions

Hon. Dorothy Eugénie Brett (10 November 1883 – 27 August 1977) was an Anglo-American painter, remembered as much for her social life as for her art. Born into an aristocratic British family, she lived a sheltered early life. During her student years at the Slade School of Art, she associated with Dora Carrington, Barbara Hiles and the Bloomsbury group. Among the people she met was novelist D. H. Lawrence, and it was at his invitation that she moved to Taos, New Mexico in 1924. She remained there for the rest of her life, becoming an American citizen in 1938.

Her work can be found in the Smithsonian American Art Museum in Washington D.C., in the Millicent Rogers Museum and the Harwood Museum of Art, both in Taos. Also at the New Mexico Museum of Art, Santa Fe, the Roswell Museum and Art Center, Roswell, New Mexico and in many private collections.

== Early life in London ==
Dorothy Brett and her sister had extremely sheltered childhoods. Their father, Reginald Baliol Brett (from 1899 Viscount Esher), was a Liberal Party politician who became influential at the court of Queen Victoria at Windsor Castle, where the girls attended dancing classes with Princess Beatrice's children, overseen by the Queen. Their mother Eleanor was the daughter of Sylvain Van de Weyer and granddaughter of Joshua Bates; their paternal grandmother was French. The family lived near Windsor and had homes in London and at Callander in Perthshire, Scotland, where Dorothy spent days fishing in the River Teith and nearby Loch Lubnaig.

Dorothy recounted in later life that a friend of her father attempted to sexually assault her when aged about 14–15, an experience to which she attributed her later fear and distrust of men.

However, as noted by a New Mexico historian, a childhood experience may have influenced her decision to see the American West: "In her childhood, the girl attended the touring Buffalo Bill's Wild West Show. She was thrilled to view a stagecoach chased around the arena by an Indian war party dressed in feathered head gear. Her fascination with American Indians, beginning that day, never left her."

In 1910 Dorothy enrolled at the Slade School of Art where she studied until 1916, and began to be known by her surname only. Along with other female art students, especially Dora Carrington and Barbara Hiles, she had her hair cut short (for the time) in a style that led Virginia Woolf to call them 'cropheads'. Through fellow student Mark Gertler, she met Lady Ottoline Morrell and began mixing in an artistic and literary circle that included Clive Bell, Bertrand Russell, D. H. Lawrence, Virginia Woolf, Augustus John, Aldous Huxley, Gilbert Cannan, and George Bernard Shaw. Her sister Sylvia became Ranee of Sarawak. During this period, Dorothy became severely deaf, causing difficulty in communication that lasted the rest of her life; she used an ear trumpet and, later, hearing aids.

After visiting Taos for the first time in 1923 at the invitation of Mabel Dodge Luhan and then returning to London, D. H. Lawrence held a dinner party at the Cafe Royal (which he called "The Last Supper"). There he tried to recruit friends to move to Taos in order "to create a utopian society he called 'Rananim'", an idea he had first proposed in a letter of 3 January 1915. While almost all who attended had "agreed to follow Lawrence to New Mexico ... when it came to the actual packing for departure, there was only one recruit — the Honorable Dorothy Brett."

== Life in New Mexico after 1924 ==
In March 1924 Lawrence, Frieda Lawrence, and Brett arrived in Taos and stayed with Luhan. Initially, they all got along well, "but tensions gradually built ... [and] Mabel, in a burst of generosity (and probably to keep Lawrence in Taos) offered Lawrence a tract of 160 acres on her ranch" located some twenty miles northwest of Taos. The Lawrences first named it the "Lobo Ranch" and then the "Kiowa Ranch", while today it has been known as the D. H. Lawrence Ranch ever since it was acquired by the University of New Mexico in the 1950s.

Lawrence refused Luhan's offer, but Frieda accepted it, and the deed was in her name. After some renovations, the trio settled at the ranch in May/June 1924 and Brett took the smaller of the two cabins on the property. She spent much of her time there painting "or she would assist Lawrence by typing his manuscripts," among which were St Mawr and The Woman who Rode Away.

Among Brett's accomplishments when living with the Lawrences were her "exceptional ... handyman skills, including carpentry", but "[t]he three women — Frieda, Mabel and Brett — competed for D. H. Lawrence's attention. The rivals often got along fairly well with one another, but sometimes not". Early in 1926 Brett and the Lawrences met again on Capri. From there D. H. Lawrence and Brett travelled to Ravello, where they stayed together for ten days, while Frieda remained on Capri.

After the Lawrences left New Mexico in 1925 and his death in 1930, Simmons notes that:

Brett remained alone on the ranch before moving into Taos. There she lived in poverty for several years, in one case obliged to share an outhouse in winter with neighbor and author Frank Waters. She managed to survive by selling her paintings of Pueblo Indians, cranked out for the tourist market at give-away prices. In time, though, her art took on a mystical quality and began to be snapped up by museums around the country.

Editor and book designer Merle Armitage wrote a book about this time in New Mexico. Taos Quartet in Three Movements was originally to appear in Flair Magazine, but the magazine folded before its publication. This short work describes the tumultuous relationship of D. H. Lawrence, his wife Frieda, Dorothy Brett and Mabel Dodge Sterne Luhan, a wealthy patron of the arts. Armitage took it upon himself to print 16 hardcover copies of this work for his friends. Richard Pousette-Dart executed the drawings for Taos Quartet that was published in 1950.

She became a United States citizen in 1938. In later life she became admired as one of the leading personalities of Taos. Living alone in her small home outside of town, she was fawned over by the Taos elite during infrequent visits to town. During her time in Taos, she became friends with American author William Goyen and many in his circle including American artist Joseph Glasco. She was partner in the Manchester Gallery on Ledoux Street with Henry Manchester where she met Navajo artist R.C. Gorman, whose art she helped exhibit in the 1960s. He painted at least one portrait of her in 1964 during a visit to Taos while showing at the Manchester Gallery. She and Gorman became good friends and he created another drawing of her with her dog in 1968 called Brett & Reggie "What Fun". Again, circa 1972 R.C. made a masterful depiction of the Lady Brett approaching her 90th birthday in oil pastel.

== Depictions ==
Penelope Keith portrayed Brett in the 1981 film Priest of Love, which told the story of Lawrence's last years in New Mexico.
