= D. H. Lawrence Ranch =

- D. H. Lawrence Ranch Historic District
- U.S. National Register of Historic Places
- U.S. Historic district
- NM State Register of Cultural Properties
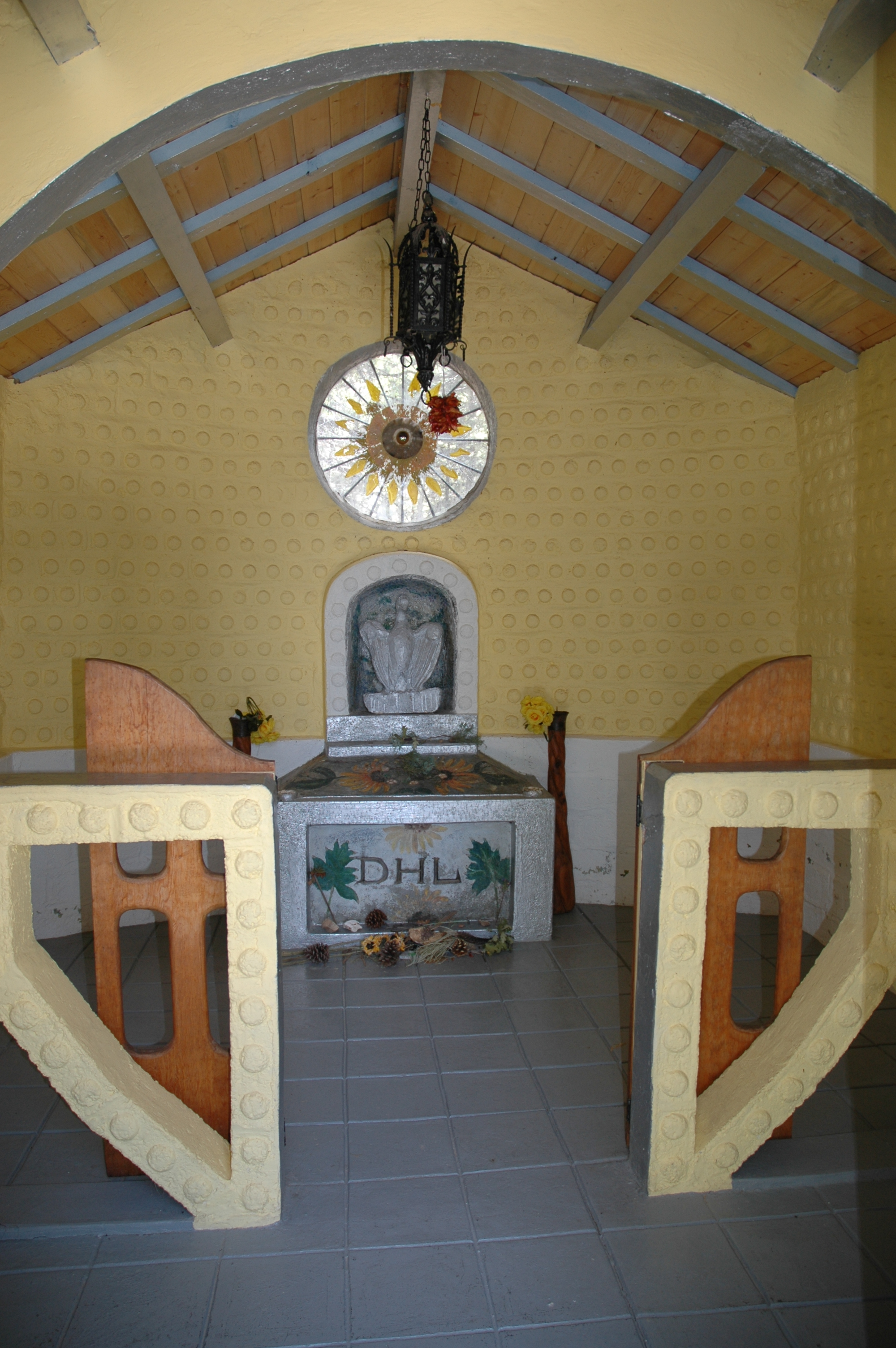
- Interior of the Lawrence Memorial, with the stone containing the initials D.H.L.

- Location within New Mexico
- Nearest city: San Cristobal, New Mexico
- Coordinates: 36°34′55″N 105°35′37″W
- Area: 160 acres (65 ha)
- Built: 1891
- Architect: John Craig; et al.
- Architectural style: Log cabins
- NRHP reference No.: 03001410
- NMSRCP No.: 1841

Significant dates
- Added to NRHP: January 15, 2004
- Designated NMSRCP: August 8, 2003

The D. H. Lawrence Ranch, as it is now known, was the New Mexico residence of the English novelist D. H. Lawrence for about two years during the 1920s and the only property Lawrence and his wife Frieda owned. The 160-acre (65 ha) property, originally named the Kiowa Ranch, is located about eighteen miles (29 km) northwest of Taos, New Mexico, near Lobo Mountain and San Cristobal in Taos County, at about 8,600 feet (2,600 m) above sea level. The gate of the ranch is 4.2 miles (6.8 km) by road from a historic marker and turnoff on state route NM 522.

The ranch was briefly owned by Mabel Dodge Luhan as part of more extensive holdings nearby, although it had been occupied by homesteaders and several structures existed on the property dating back to the 1890s. When Mabel donated it to Frieda Lawrence (after Lawrence himself declined) in 1924, it became first the summer home of the couple and then Frieda's home until her death in 1956, at which time she bequeathed it to the University of New Mexico. The ranch is on the National Register of Historic Places and the New Mexico State Register of Cultural Properties. It was closed to visitors from 2008 to 2014 for repairs, but re-opened to the public in March 2015.

== Lawrence in New Mexico ==
Lawrence and his wife Frieda received an invitation dated November 1921 from Mabel Dodge Sterne, who had read some of Lawrence's Sea and Sardinia, excerpts from which had appeared in The Dial, a literary magazine to which Lawrence contributed. Sterne was a wealthy society hostess and arts patron who had taken up residence in Taos and who was to marry Tony Lujan (stylized Luhan by Sterne), a Native American from Taos Pueblo, thus becoming Mabel Dodge Luhan in 1923. Traveling via Australia, then to San Francisco, Lawrence and Frieda arrived in Taos in mid-September 1922.

After some conflict between the Lawrences and Sterne and Lujan, during which the Lawrences moved into one of Tony's guest houses, then into another belonging to friends, Lawrence and Frieda went south to Mexico in March 1923, after which Frieda returned to Europe. Finally, a reluctant Lawrence sailed for England that November. In London, an attempt to lure friends to return to Taos with him brought only one recruit, Dorothy Brett, an artist in her own right and daughter of a lord. Lawrence, Frieda, and Dorothy Brett arrived in Taos in March 1924, again as guests of Sterne. Again, tensions arose and possibly to keep Lawrence in New Mexico, it was proposed to give Lawrence the Kiowa Ranch, some 20 miles from Taos. He refused, saying, "We can't accept such a present from anybody." However, Frieda accepted, telling Lawrence that "we'll give Mabel the manuscript" of one of Lawrence's most well-known novels, Sons and Lovers. The deed was in her name.

While the couple spent a relatively short time there, the ranch became the only property that they ever owned during their marriage, and it became a place of rest and relaxation, where Lawrence wrote much of his novel St Mawr and began The Plumed Serpent, during five months of the summer of 1924. Aldous Huxley is known to have visited the Lawrences at the ranch.

By October 1924, Lawrence and Frieda left for Mexico and it was while they were in Oaxaca that he was diagnosed with tuberculosis. The couple returned to the U.S., and by April 1925, they were back at the ranch where they spent the summer, Lawrence continuing work on the novel which became The Plumed Serpent. However, with his better health and their six-month visa about to expire, Lawrence was determined to return to Europe. They left Taos on September 11, Lawrence's 40th birthday, and settled in Italy. Although he never returned to New Mexico, in a letter to Brett in December 1929 from Bandol, France, Lawrence expressed some interest in doing so: "I really think that I shall try to come back in the spring. I begin to believe that I shall never get well over here."

However, D. H. Lawrence died in France on March 2, 1930, and his body was buried near Vence. In 1935, at Frieda's request, his remains were exhumed and then cremated and his ashes were brought to the ranch by Angelo Ravagli (Frieda's lover and the man who became her third husband in 1950) with the intention that they be buried there.

== Memorial ==
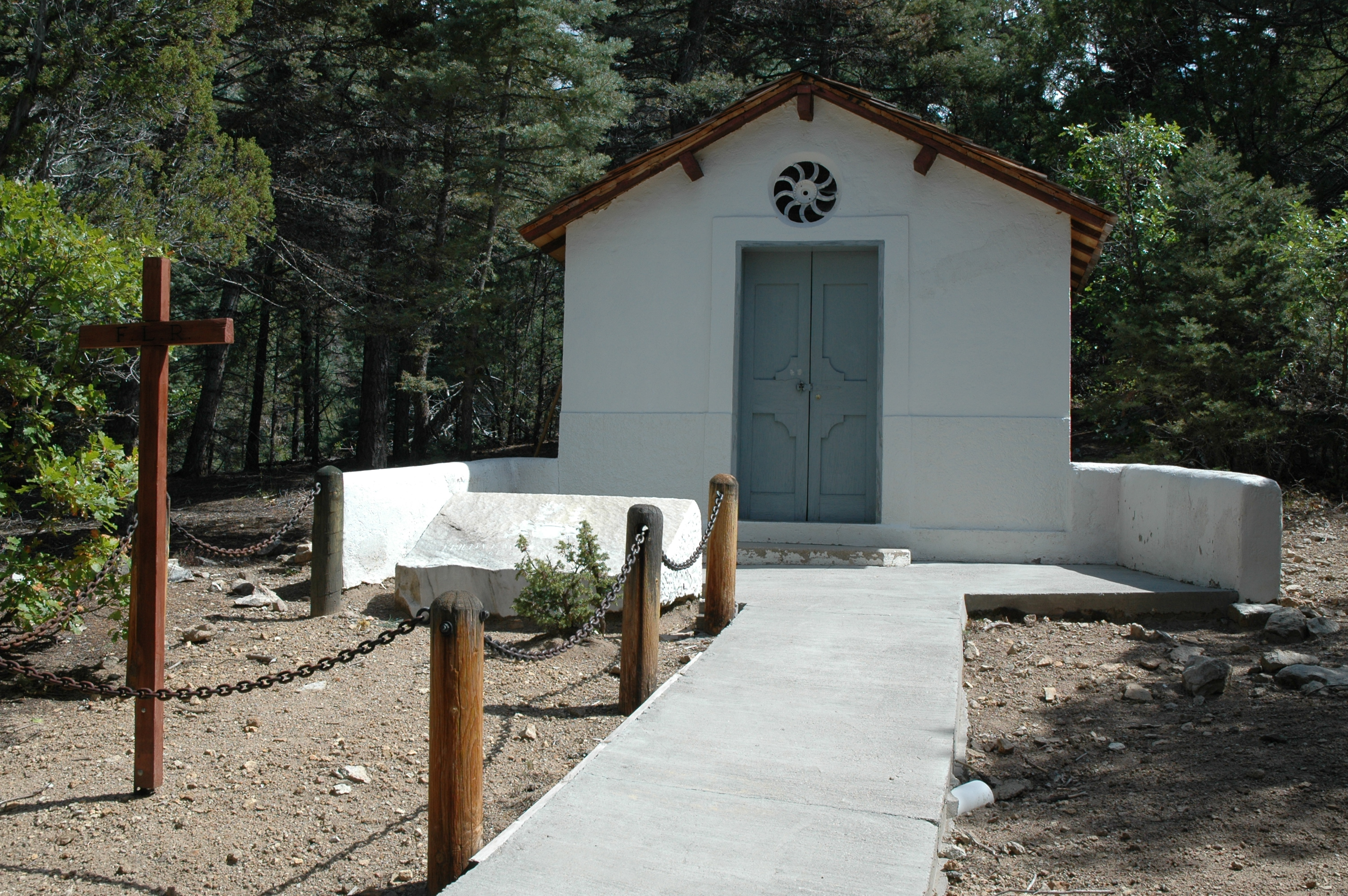
View up the steps towards the exterior of the D. H. Lawrence Memorial

After Lawrence's death, Frieda returned to the ranch and lived there with Ravagli, who constructed the white plastered 12 ft. x 15 ft. Memorial building in 1934.

While some controversy surrounds the issue of what exactly happened to the writer's ashes after the cremation, it generally is agreed that they were brought to New Mexico and then mixed with concrete to form part of the large memorial stone which was placed in a small covered building on the ranch site, now known as the Lawrence Memorial, although the term "shrine" had been used in the past.

At her death in Taos in 1956, Frieda was buried on the ranch property and she bequeathed it to the University of New Mexico at Albuquerque, its present owner (overseen through the UNM D. H. Lawrence Ranch Initiatives, co-chaired through the Department of English and Institutional Support Services/Physical Plant Department). Her grave is located just outside the Memorial building and visible on the left of the picture.

A guest book allows visitors to sign in, see who has been there and from where they have traveled. For example, in Spring 1979, the guest book showed the bold, black signature of English novelist "Iris Murdoch, Oxford, England."

The UNM D. H. Lawrence Ranch Initiatives was created the end of 2014. "The purpose of the Ranch Initiatives is to preserve the legacy of novelist D. H. Lawrence and his wife, Frieda Lawrence. The Ranch Initiatives program will seek to place the operation of the property on a firm financial basis and to restore and develop the site so that it can support educational, cultural, and research activities for students, faculty, and the greater New Mexico community. This mission honors the directives of Frieda Lawrence's will, which stipulated that the property 'be used for educational, cultural, charitable, and recreational purposes.'"

Rananim, the online writing community of the D. H. Lawrence Ranch Initiatives, began offering its first set of online workshops in October 2014 to bring awareness to the ranch. Net proceeds benefit the renovation and promotion of the ranch. Rananim was the name of the utopian society Lawrence wished to create with other writers and artists.

== Other features ==
=== Dwellings ===
"Two dwellings and a small barn existed on the property" when Lawrence, Frieda, and Dorothy Brett went to live there in early May, 1924. The largest, "The Homesteader's Cabin" was chosen by the couple while Lady Brett occupied the small one-room cabin, which may be visited. Neither log cabin was in good repair and renovations were necessary in the early months of their occupancy.

=== The Lawrence Tree ===
A striking feature of the exterior is the very large pine which became known as the Lawrence Tree. The writer frequently worked at a small table at its base and he expressed his love for it as follows:

The big pine tree in front of the house, standing still and unconcerned and alive ... the overshadowing tree whose green top one never looks at ... One goes out of the door and the tree-trunk is there, like a guardian angel. The tree-trunk, the long work table and the fence!

In the summer of 1929, on one of her early visits to New Mexico, Georgia O'Keeffe visited the Lawrence Ranch. The visit inspired her painting The Lawrence Tree, with its unusual viewpoint gained from lying on a long bench and looking up into the branches of the tree.

== In popular culture ==
American author Charles Baxter's short story "Surprised by Joy" centers around a couple who travels to the Ranch while recovering from the death of their child.

== See also ==
- National Register of Historic Places listings in Taos County, New Mexico
