= Angelo Ravagli =

Italian officer notable in the life of D.H. Lawrence

Angelo Ravagli (1891–1976) was an officer in the Italian Bersaglieri who is notable for the part he played in the life of D. H. Lawrence.

In 1926, shortly after Lawrence and his wife, Frieda von Richthofen, went to stay in Spotorno in Italy in late 1925, von Richthofen started an affair with Ravagli that continued intermittently over the four years until Lawrence's death in 1930. Ravagli took English lessons from Lawrence who, when Ravagli helped him fix a smoking chimney, told von Richthofen: "That is a man who would be useful to have at the Kiowa ranch."

In 1931, Ravagli left his wife and three children and went with von Richthofen to Lawrence's ranch in New Mexico, married her in 1950, and lived there with her until her death in 1956. In 1935, von Richthofen sent Ravagli to Vence, where Lawrence had spent the last weeks of his life in the Ad Astra Sanatorium, to have Lawrence's body exhumed and cremated and his ashes brought back to the ranch.

Ravagli claimed that Lawrence once discovered him and Frieda having sex. One of Lawrence's biographers says that Lawrence responded by having an affair with Dorothy Brett. John Worthen, another of his biographers, believed that Frieda's affair with Ravagli inspired Lawrence to write Lady Chatterley's Lover, which Lawrence started to write in Italy in October 1926. Worthen based this on letters Frieda wrote to her mother in the 1920s.

This story is corroborated in an autobiography by dancer-turned-socialite Tullah Hanley, who visited Ravagli sometime after Frieda had died, in order to write a piece about him for Life Magazine. He was living in Spotorno, near Genoa and claimed he once had a "ménage à trois" with Lawrence and his wife, and the affair with her began after Lawrence had left home to work on a book. Ravagli had previously told Tullah that he was the "gardener-lover" in the book, but he was by this time living as a grandfather in Italy, enjoying relative anonymity as apparently town-folk had not discovered this secret. Being respected in the community, he was content that the book had not become popular in America so his village (and presumably himself) didn't become a tourist attraction.
