= Adrienne Burgess =

Australian actress (born 1947)

Adrienne Burgess (born 20 November 1947) is a UK-based Australian actress, mainly seen on British television and resident in the UK.

Her acting credits include: Doctor Who (in the serial The Sun Makers), Blake's 7, Terry and June, Just Good Friends, Dickens of London, The Bill, and the 1981 film Priest of Love. She is married to actor Martin Cochrane.
