= The Lawrence Tree =

1929 painting by Georgia O'Keeffe

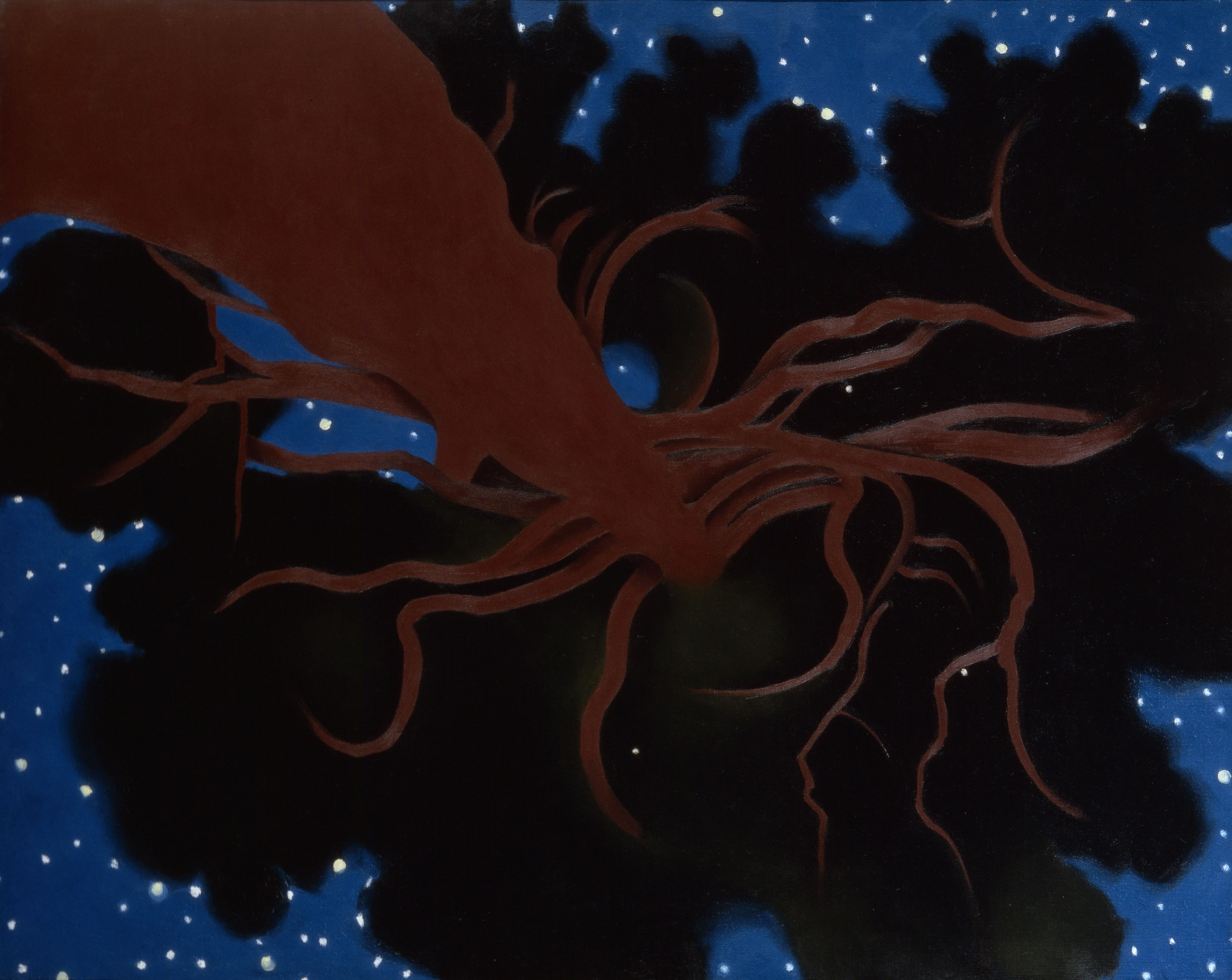
- The Lawrence Tree, 1929
- Artist: Georgia O'Keeffe
- Year: 1929
- Medium: Painting
- Subject: Ponderosa pine
- Dimensions: 79 cm × 99.5 cm (31 in × 39.18 in)
- Location: Wadsworth Atheneum, Hartford
- Accession: 1981.23
- Website: Wadsworth Atheneum

The Lawrence Tree is a painting by Georgia O'Keeffe in 1929 of a large ponderosa pine tree on the D. H. Lawrence Ranch in Taos County, New Mexico. The tree still survives (as of 2024) and may be visited at the Lawrence Ranch.

== Background ==
D. H. Lawrence and Frieda Lawrence lived in a cabin near the tree, under which the author sat on a weathered bench and wrote on a table.

The big pine tree in front of the house, standing still and unconcerned and alive...the overshadowing tree whose green top one never looks at... One goes out of the door and the tree-trunk is there, like a guardian angel. The tree-trunk, the long work table and the fence!

— D. H. Lawrence

== Overview ==
In 1929, O'Keeffe stayed with Mabel Dodge Luhan, who was a patroness who brought modernists to the Taos art colony. While there she visited the ranch and painted the tree. The perspective was captured by lying down on the bench and looking into the night sky through the branches of the tree. Because of this, the work can be hung in different ways. The Wadsworth Atheneum, who owns the painting, displays it with the treetop facing the bottom edge. They note that "when the Wadsworth Atheneum acquired this painting from the artist, she confirmed its ambiguous orientation. At one point it was installed with the trunk emerging from the lower edge. It is presently shown, in keeping with her earlier preference, as it is oriented here, allowing the viewer to experience the artist’s favored vantage point."

Art historian Bonnie L. Grad has shown that O'Keeffe's painting is not simply a depiction of this monumental tree, but is an homage to Lawrence, whose writings were an important though generally overlooked source of inspiration for the artist (as explored in Grad's 1998 article, "Georgia O'Keeffe's Lawrencean Vision" in the Archives of American Art Journal). She describes this painting as "a fitting and generous tribute to the author whose legacy she had become heir to."
