= Joseph Glasco =

American artist (1925–1996)

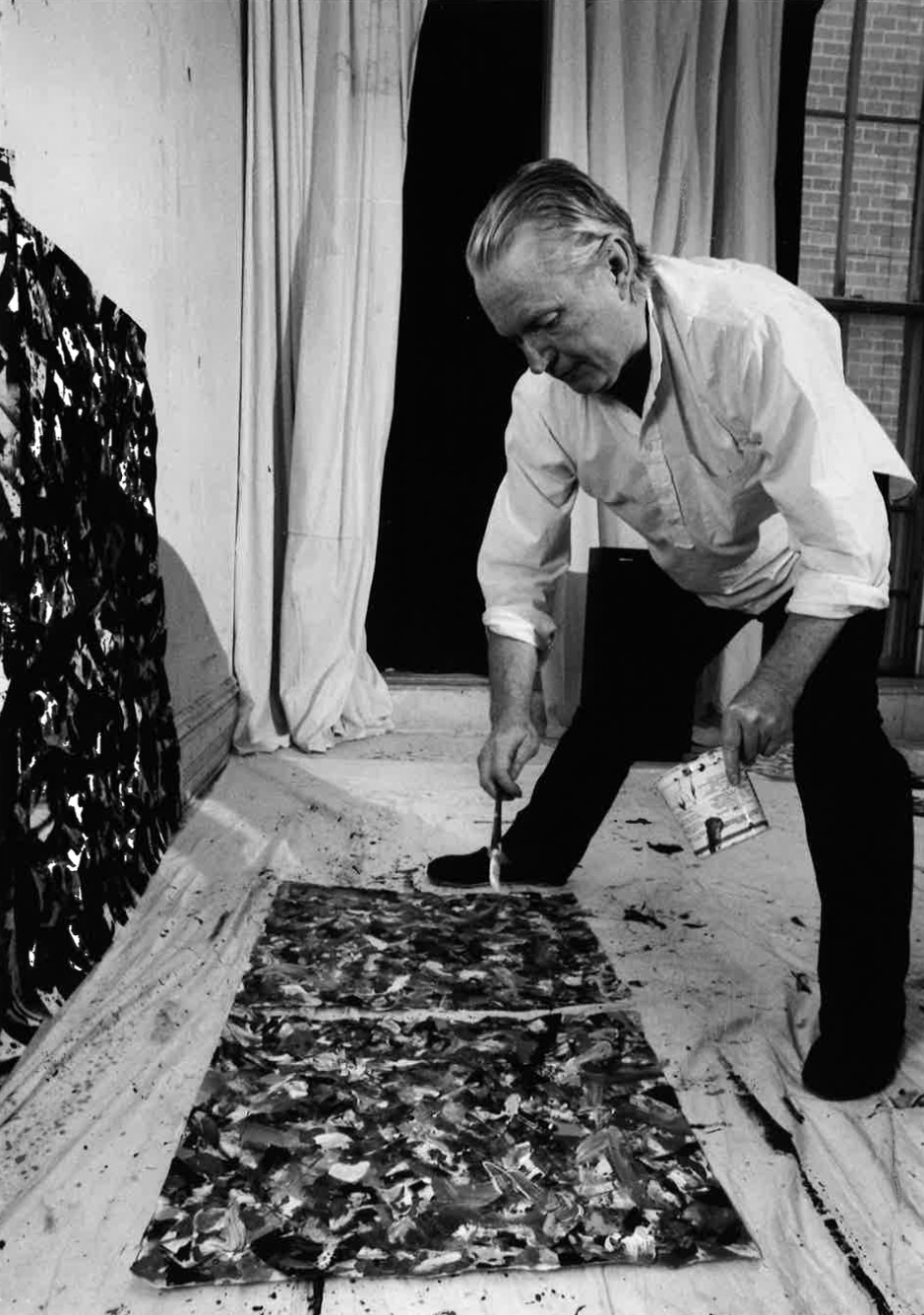
- Glasco, early 1990s
- Born: January 19, 1925; Pauls Valley, Oklahoma, U.S.
- Died: May 31, 1996 (aged 71); Galveston, Texas, U.S.
- Education: University of Texas at Austin (1941-1942 before drafted); Portsmouth Art School; Jeppson Institute; School of Painting and Sculpture, San Miguel de Allende; Art Students League
- Occupation: Artist
- Known for: Drawing painting sculpture
- Movement: Figurative art, surrealism, cubism, abstract art, abstract expressionism

Joseph Glasco (January 19, 1925 – May 31, 1996) was an American abstract expressionist painter, draftsman and sculptor. He is most known for his early figurative drawings and paintings and in later years for deconstructing the figure to develop his non-objective paintings building on abstraction of the 1950s.

During his early years in New York, Alfonso Ossorio, Jackson Pollock, Lee Krasner and others were friends and influences. Other influences on Glasco's art included Jean Dubuffet and Hans Hofmann. Later in his life, Glasco befriended younger artists including Julian Schnabel, and George Condo.

== Formative years (1925–1949) ==
Joseph Glasco was born in Pauls Valley, Oklahoma in 1925 and grew up in Tyler, Texas. His parents were Lowell and Pauline Glasco. He had three brothers, Gregory, Gordon, Michael, and two sisters, Anne Brawley and Marion Chambers (married to oil executive C. Fred Chambers).

He was sent to boarding school in St. Louis where he pursued his interest in art and subsequently attended the University of Texas at Austin. He was drafted by the United States Army where he served in the European theatre during World War II. Glasco became a decorated soldier from his service as a Private first class in Patton's 3rd Army in the Battle of the Bulge where he earned a Bronze Star Medal. While waiting for his orders to return to the U.S. after VE Day, Glasco was assigned to Portsmouth Art School in Bristol, England, to study art. This enabled him to visit London and its theaters frequently. After Glasco's military orders arrived, he returned to Texas to seek employment.

Glasco lived and worked in Dallas for a time and drafted advertisements for the Dreyfuss & Son Department Store. When he realized advertising did not suit his interests, Glasco moved to Los Angeles to continue his art studies. There he met and briefly studied with Rico Lebrun at the Jeppson Art Institute. He then later studied at the School of Painting and Sculpture in San Miguel de Allende, Mexico founded by the Peruvian intellectual and artist Felipe Cassio del Pomar and the American Stirling Dickinson the director of artistic studies. In San Miguel de Allende, Glasco also became acquainted with Jesús Guerrero Galván as well as Rufino Tamayo and his wife.

== New York City (1949-1960) ==
In 1949, Glasco arrived in New York City and attended the Art Students League of New York where he studied with George Grosz. Glasco was soon recognized as a skilled draftsman and painter.

Shortly after Glasco arrived in New York City, he met Alfonso A. Ossorio, an artist and wealthy patron of the arts who introduced Glasco to his circle of artist friends including Jackson Pollock, Lee Krasner, Willem de Kooning, Jean Dubuffet, and Clyfford Still. He was influenced by his friendship with Jackson Pollock and Alfonso A. Ossorio as well as the artwork of Dubuffet and the art theory of Hans Hofmann.

At the age of twenty-five, Glasco had his first one-man show at New York's prestigious Perls Gallery. After his successful exhibition at Perls, Glasco became the youngest artist featured in an collection of abstract expressionists' works at the Museum of Modern Art in New York. His work "Big Sitting Cat" was purchased for the permanent collection of The Museum of Modern Art when the museum acquired his drawing in 1949. The Metropolitan Museum of Art also acquired one of Glasco's 1949 drawings and his career as a New York artist was launched. When Perls closed, Glasco moved to the Catherine Viviano Gallery, which also managed the estate of Max Beckmann and several other important European and American artists. Glasco met the well-known Picasso collector Stanley J. Seeger at the Catherine Viviano Gallery. Seeger became one of Glasco's most important patrons and the two remained friends until his death. Another important collector of Glasco's paintings and sculptures was Joseph Hirshhorn. The Smithsonian Institution established the Joseph H. Hirshhorn Museum and Sculpture Garden in Washington, D.C., in 1966 to hold the collection of over 6,000 works including Glasco's paintings and sculptures. Pulitzer Prizing winning poet and short story writer, Elizabeth Bishop also collected Glasco's early drawings. Glasco would remain with the Catherine Viviano Gallery until the gallery closed in 1970.

Glasco often credited his conversations about painting with Jackson Pollock as critical to how he thought about his own art over the entire arc of his career. But while Pollock had been a critical influence on Glasco during his nascent years in New York, Glasco's early paintings stood apart from the Abstract Expressionist movement which was gaining momentum and attracting national and even international recognition. Instead, as Abstract Expressionism was exploding around him, Glasco's remained steadfast with work that was distinctly figurative, densely worked, and formal in style.

While his conversations with Pollock remained important to Glasco throughout his lifetime, it was, in fact, Ossorio and Dubuffet and not Pollock who likely provided the early catalyst for change in Glasco's work as it became more textural and abstract.

== 1962–1975 ==
Glasco's peripatetic nature and restless soul demanded he leave New York and travel widely in service to his unique vision. After living and working in New York City with frequent stays at Ossorio's well-known East Hampton estate, The Creeks, the artist followed Ossorio's lead and spent considerable time in Taos, New Mexico with his partner, the author William Goyen. There, he became known as one of the Taos Moderns and made the acquaintance of Frieda Lawrence (widow of D.H. Lawrence) who would be another pivotal influence on his life and work. After her death and after a concentrated period creating sculpture in Taos, Glasco decamped again to the East Coast and England where he had made influential acquaintances among the London theater crowd.

It is believed that Glasco may have known gotten to know of Cy Twombly through the artist Afro Balsaldella while Glasco and Afro were in Mykonos in 1961. However, it's also possible they knew each other earlier through their connection with the Art Students League in New York. Later, Glasco said that he and Twombly saw each every summer in Mykonos for years.

While Glasco's early work featured highly stylized representational forms, over the next 20 years, his work gradually shifted to a heavily patterned, geometric almost cubist approach to the figure.

Then, in the mid-seventies, Glasco left figurative, surrealist and cubist work behind to explore large abstract paintings. However, before this stylistic transformation in his art would evolve, Glasco's restless spirit took him on many sojourns to various places in Europe including Greece and the Canary Islands, and later back to Mexico.

Glasco's work continued to be exhibited by the Catherine Viviano Gallery and elsewhere across the U.S. while he moved from place to place. After his extensive travels in Europe, by the early 1970 he found a large, New York-style 19th Century loft in Galveston, Texas which he made his permanent home base. After 1975, Glasco spent time working primarily in Galveston with repeated and extended stays in Europe and New York.

== Late paintings (1975–1996) ==
Under the influence of Ossorio, Glasco first explored abstract collage in the early 1960s, but it wasn't until the mid-1970s his paintings had become completely abstract. He then began producing intensely colored, all-over abstract paintings of rhythmical, mosaic-styled canvas on canvas paintings in two stages. He first covered the surface with a gestural layer of paint, and then applied and adhered canvas pieces cut from painted canvases made expressly of random patterns for adding to the works in progress. Glasco uses collaged elements both to carry color and to activate the surface.

For Glasco, this approach to painting was appealing due to the hands-on nature which allowed him the spontaneity he prized. Using collage and richly hued paint, he made textured abstractions he felt were the next step beyond the drip paintings of Jackson Pollock. And, he was particularly fascinated with the process of creating layers of paint and applied canvas creating an uneven, oftentimes rough surface texture. Glasco was satisfied by the shadows, silhouettes and contours he produced as he broke the surface plane of the canvas with a cut patchwork of painted layers. Glasco discussed his late paintings in a video discussion supported by the Mellon Foundation with Carol Mancusi-Ungaro of The Menil Collection and Marti Mayo, then Director of the Contemporary Arts Museum Houston.

Glasco's new and innovative approach to painting began to take precedence. As he advanced his unique approach to painting, he returned to New York and established a studio in Soho which allowed him to make more work and renew his involvement in the New York art world. This resulted in two exhibitions at Gimpel & Weitzenhoff Gallery on Madison Avenue in 1979 and 1983. After his second one-person show at Gimpel, Glasco returned to work in his Galveston loft with frequent forays to New York. In Galveston, Glasco became acquainted with Julian Schnabel, a young artist who graduated from the University of Houston, moved to New York, and returned to Houston temporarily. Schnabel visited an artist with a loft adjacent to Glasco's on The Strand, Galveston's bustling main street. After the two became acquainted, while decades apart in age, Schnabel and Glasco recognized their artistic and intellectual kindred spirits and became fast friends. Glasco often traveled with Schnabel and his family and they discussed each other's work, and advised on the installation of each other's exhibitions. It became an important relationship to both artists which continued until Glasco's death.

Over several decades, Glasco had many gallery exhibitions in Houston, including exhibitions with Meredith Long & Company. The exhibitions attracted numerous Texas collectors to Glasco's work. After leaving Meredith Long, Glasco was represented by Betty Moody Gallery in Houston until his death in 1996.

Glasco's reputation in Texas and beyond continued to grow when a major work by Glasco was selected as the signature object for Barbara Rose's inaugural Fresh Paint exhibition of Texas art for The Museum of Fine Arts Houston where she was then chief curator. The exhibition drew even greater attention to Glasco's works within the art world and the work was acquired by the museum. This interest culminated in a 1986 retrospective exhibition of Glasco's work at the Contemporary Arts Museum Houston organized by then curator (and subsequent director) Marti Mayo.

After the 1986 retrospective, Joseph Glasco continued to work in his loft on The Strand and in the 19th Century Victorian house he purchased on Sealy Street in Galveston's historic district. Glasco was often visited by an array of locals, family members, and many out-of-town visitors such as Schnabel and the artist George Condo with whom he had become friends and remained close in his later years. His visitors included friends from all over the world including museum professionals and gallery owners such as Leslie Waddington of Waddington Galleries and Betty Moody, both of whom he would have exhibitions with in the late 1980s and 1990s.

Glasco continued to paint, and show his work nationally and internationally while traveling frequently to Europe, India, Hong Kong, Japan, Malaysia, Nepal, Singapore and Thailand. Notably, forty years after his work appeared in the 1952 Whitney Annual, his work was chosen for the 1991 Biennial Exhibition at the Whitney Museum of American Art in which, among others, Jasper Johns, Ellsworth Kelly, Joan Mitchell, Robert Rauschenberg, Julian Schnabel and Cy Twombly were also exhibited.

Several of Glasco's late works were purchased by leading museums including the Museum of Fine Arts, Houston, The Museum of Modern Art in New York, and other distinguished institutions.

Troubled by health issues late in his life, Glasco continued his work producing a significant body of paintings in the 1990s until his death in 1996. Glasco's final exhibition before his death, Joseph Glasco: A Celebration, took place in Galveston at the Galveston Arts Center. Glasco died on May 31, 1996, in Galveston, Texas.

Glasco's estate endowed the Joseph Glasco Charitable Foundation with the specific purpose of managing the Glasco estate art holdings, cultivating the legacy of Joseph Glasco and providing university scholarships for black students.

== Select museum collections ==
At the time, Glasco was the youngest artist collected by The Museum of Modern Art in New York at the age of 25. Following this early success, Glasco's art was collected by many of the top museums in the United States including: Albright-Knox Art Gallery, Buffalo, New York; The Art Museum, Princeton University, Princeton, New Jersey; The Baltimore Museum of Art, Baltimore, Maryland; Brooklyn Museum, Brooklyn, New York; Corcoran Gallery of Art, Washington, D.C.; Dallas Museum of Art, Dallas, Texas; The Detroit Institute of Arts, Detroit, Michigan; Harvard Art Museums, Cambridge, Massachusetts; High Museum of Art, Atlanta, Georgia; Hirshhorn Museum and Sculpture Garden, Smithsonian Institution, Washington, D.C.; The Menil Collection; The Metropolitan Museum of Art, New York, New York; Museum of Fine Arts, Houston, Texas; The Museum of Modern Art, New York, New York; Solomon R. Guggenheim Museum, New York, New York; Whitney Museum of American Art, New York, New York; Yale University Art Gallery, New Haven, Connecticut.

From July–October 2025, the Museum of Fine Arts, Houston exhibited Celebrating Joseph Glasco for the centenary of Glasco's birth.

== Honors and awards ==
- Mayor's Awards for Outstanding Contributions to the Arts, 1987, Houston Texas

== Personal life ==
Poet and poetry editor for The New Yorker, Howard Moss introduced Glasco to writer William Goyen and from 1952 to the early 1960s they were partners. In Clark Davis' biography of Goyen, It Starts With Trouble, Davis documents their relationship.

In addition to his many relationships with artists across several generations, Glasco's friendships and acquaintances extended to many other important figures of the time from art and art criticism, film, literature, music, opera, and theater including: Donald Baechler, Tallulah Bankhead, Samuel Barber, Paul Bowles, Jane Bowles, Dorothy Brett, Francesco Clemente, John Dexter, Mary Doyle, John Frankenheimer, Clement Greenberg, David Hockney, Margo Jones, Peter Lanyon, Frieda Lawrence, Giancarlo Menotti, Frank O'Hara, Vincent Price, Stephen Spender, Teresa Stratas, Elaine Stritch and Thornton Willis among many others.

Stanley Seeger and David Chesler were friends of Glasco and collected his art throughout the artist's career. The Glasco artworks held in the estates of Seeger and Chesler have been managed by Wolfs Gallery in Beachwood, Ohio.
