= Annabel Abbs =

English writer and novelist

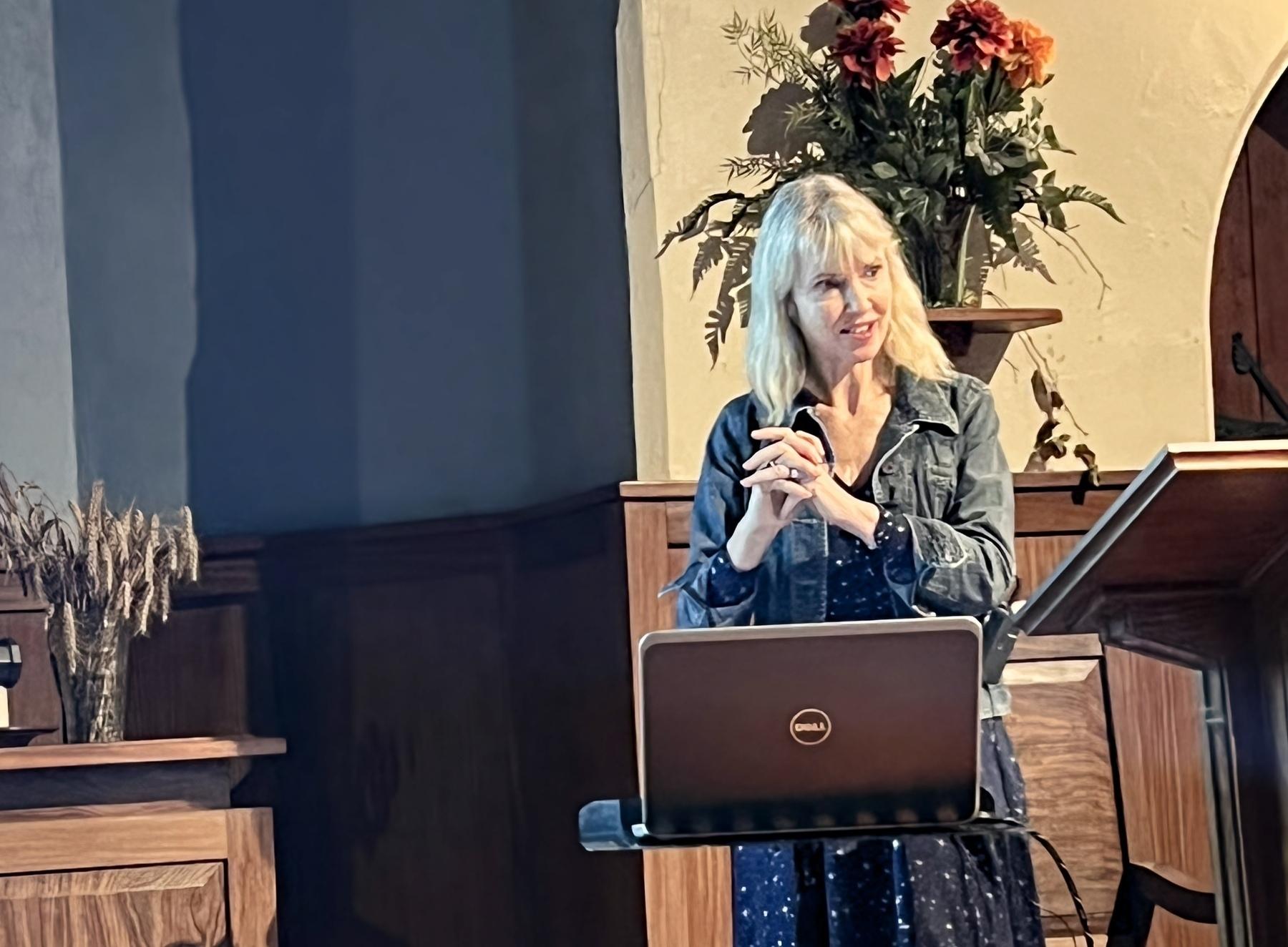
- Annabel Abbs in 2024
- Born: 20 October 1964 (age 61); Bristol, England
- Occupation: Writer
- Parents: Peter Abbs (father); Barbara Abbs (mother)
- Website: annabelabbs.com

Annabel Abbs (born 20 October 1964) is an English writer and novelist.

== Early life ==
The daughter of poet and academic, Professor Peter Abbs and gardening writer, Barbara Abbs, Annabel Abbs lives in London and East Sussex. She is the eldest of three children and was born in Bristol. She grew up in Bristol, Dorset, Wales, and Lewes in East Sussex. She attended Lewes Priory school and has a BA in English Literature from the University of East Anglia, and an MA from Kingston University.

== Works ==
Her first novel, The Joyce Girl, was published in 2016 and tells a fictionalised story of Lucia Joyce, daughter of James Joyce. It won the Impress Prize for New Writers, the Spotlight First Novel Award, was longlisted for the Bath Novel Award, the Caledonia Novel Award and the Waverton Good Read Award.

The Joyce Girl was a Reader Pick in The Guardian 2016 and was one of ten books selected for presentation at the 2017 Berlin Film Festival, where it was given Five Stars by the Hollywood Reporter. The Joyce Girl was published in the UK, Ireland, Australia, New Zealand, Germany, Turkey, Spain, South America, Bulgaria, Poland and Russia. The Historical Novel Society described The Joyce Girl as "the best 20th century fiction of the year."

Abbs’ second novel, Frieda, tells the fictionalised story of the elopement of Frieda Weekley, wife of Ernest Weekley, with writer D.H. Lawrence in 1912. Previously Frieda von Richthofen, sister of Else von Richthofen, Frieda was a German aristocrat who later became the inspiration for many of Lawrence's female characters including Ursula in Women in Love and Connie in Lady Chatterley’s Lover. Abbs’ novel was published in 2018 in Australia/New Zealand by Hachette and in the UK by Two Roads, part of John Murray Press.

Frieda was a 2018 Times Book of the year (historical fiction) and described in The Observer as ‘exuberant’ and ‘compelling’. In 2019 Abbs delivered the annual DH Lawrence Birthday lecture alongside Dr Annalise Grice

In 2019 Abbs was described in The Observer "as one of the best historical novelists today" by literature critic, Alexander Larman.

Abbs’ first non-fiction book, The Age-Well Project, co-written with, Susan Saunders, was published by Piatkus in May 2019 and serialised in The Daily Mail and The Guardian.

Abbs' 2021 book, Windswept: Walking the Paths of Trailblazing Women (US) / Why Women Walk (UK), is a memoir and history of women who walked. Windswept was a 2021 Smithsonian Top Ten Travel Book, and one of Wanderlust's Top Ten Travel Books 2021. It was shortlisted for The Biographer’s Club Best First Biography and for the 2022 Banff Mountain Book Award.

Her 2021 novel The Language of Food, about poet Eliza Acton, was optioned for a television adaptation by Stampede Ventures and CBS Studios. Published in 19 territories as Miss Eliza's Kitchen, it was one of the New York Times Books‘ Best Historical Fiction for Winter 2021. The Historical Novel Society made it their Editor’s Choice for November 2021. In 2024, it won France’s Pocket Award for Best Foreign Fiction. In 2025, it was one of 15 books selected for The Reading Agency and BBC Arts for their Big Tasty Read, an initiative to encourage reading.

Abbs' seventh book, Sleepless: Discovering the Power of the Night Self (2024), describes a period of prolonged insomnia and examines the insomnia-induced art and activity of multiple women, many of whom only found time for themselves as everyone else slept. Translated into seven languages, it was praised by critics, including The Irish Times, The Times Literary Supplement, where Joe Moran described it as ‘Beautifully observed' and 'lyrically persuasive’ and in The Times, where it was Book of the Week.

In 2025 Abbs' eighth book, The Walking Cure (2025), was published, investigating the effects of landscape on how we think and feel.

Abbs has written for The Guardian, The Telegraph, The Financial Times, The Telegraph, The Observer, The Paris Review, Good Housekeeping, The Irish Times, Tatler, The Author, Sydney Morning Herald, The Weekend Australian Review, Psychologies and Elle Magazine. Abbs has spoken at literary festivals and given Masterclasses for The Guardian.

Abbs was a judge of the Impress Prize for New Writers in 2017 and 2019. and supports a post-graduate student of creative writing at the University of East Anglia each year.

== Controversy ==
Abbs' first book was criticised in reviews in the Irish Times and Irish Examiner for the author's 'unsubstantiated speculations' on matters including incest between Lucia Joyce and her brother, and the causes of her mental illness. In A Companion to Literary Biography (ed. Robert Bradford, Wiley Blackwell, 2019), Joyce scholar Professor John McCourt, a trustee of the International James Joyce Foundation, wrote that "With Abbs, the perverse cycle of interest in Lucia comes full circle. We are back in the territory of fiction fraudulently posing as biography", and concluded it to be "a prime contender for the worst Joyce-inspired 'biography' ever."

== Published works ==
- Abbs, Annabel (2016), The Joyce Girl, Impress, UK, 2016 ISBN 978-1-907605-87-1
- Abbs, Annabel (2018), Frieda, Two Roads, UK, 2018 ISBN 978-1-529-30018-5
- Streets, Annabel (2019), The Age-Well Project, Piatkus, UK, 2019 ISBN 978-0349419701
- Abbs, Annabel (2021), Windswept - Why Women Walk, Two Roads, UK, 2021 ISBN 978-1-529-32473-0
- Abbs, Annabel (2021), The Language of Food, Simon & Schuster, UK, 2021 ISBN 978-1-3985-0225-3
- Streets, Annabel (2022), 52 Ways to Walk, Bloomsbury, UK, 2022 ISBN 978-1-5266-5644-5
- Abbs, Annabel (2024), Sleepless, John Murray, UK, 2024 ISBN 978-1-529-36647-1
- Streets, Annabel (2025), The Walking Cure, Bloomsbury, UK, 2025 ISBN 978-1-5266-7632-0
