= C. Fred Chambers =

American oilman and political activist (1918–1989)

- Born: March 22, 1918; Dallas, Texas, U.S.
- Died: November 13, 1989 (aged 71); Houston, Texas, U.S.
- Education: University of Texas School of Law
- Occupations: Oilman, political activist
- Political party: Republican Party
- Spouse: Marion Glasco
- Children: 8
- Relatives: Joseph Glasco (brother-in-law)

C. Fred Chambers (March 22, 1918 – November 13, 1989) was an American oilman and political activist. He was the co-founder of several oil and has companies active in North America and the Netherlands. He was an aide to former president George H. W. Bush.

== Early life ==
C. Fred Chambers was born on March 22, 1918, in Dallas, Texas. He graduated from the University of Texas School of Law in Austin. He subsequently served in the United States Navy.

== Business career ==
Chambers worked as a businessman in the oil industry in Dallas and Midland, Texas. With William Kennedy, he co-founded C & K Petroleum in 1953. The oil and gas company was active in the Permian Basin, the Gulf Coast, the Mid-Continent oil province, the Rocky Mountains and Western Canada. By 1981, they sold C & K Petroleum to Alaska Interstate Company for US$200 million.

With Kennedy and J.M. Ritchie, Chambers co-founded Ritchie Oil C&K, another oil and gas company based in Alberta, Canada. They also co-founded C&K Nederland Company in the Netherlands. By 1980, Chambers co-founded Chambers Explorations with two of his sons, Charlie and Bill.

Chambers was inducted into the Hall of Fame of the Permian Basin Petroleum Museum in 2005.

== Political involvement ==
Chambers became friends with George H. W. Bush when they were both oilmen in Midland. In December 1968, Chambers was invited by Bush to a dinner at the Alibi Club in Washington, D.C., in honor of astronaut Frank Borman. Meanwhile, Chambers chaired the finance committee of Bush's 1970 senatorial campaign.

== Personal and death ==
Chambers married Marion Glasco, the sister of painter Joseph Glasco. They had eight children. They resided in Houston, Texas, and they maintained an additional property in Santa Fe, New Mexico.

Chambers died on November 13, 1989, in Houston, Texas. His funeral, held at St. Michael's Catholic Church, was attended by President Bush and Secretary of State James Baker.
