= Priory School, Lewes =

Priory School

Location
- Mountfield Road; Lewes, East Sussex, BN7 2XN; England; 50°52′09″N 0°00′58″E

Information
- Type: Foundation school
- Established: 1969
- Local authority: East Sussex
- Department for Education URN: 114598 Tables
- Ofsted: Reports
- Headteacher: Jon Curtis-Brignell
- Gender: Coeducational
- Age: 11 to 16
- Enrolment: 1,165 pupils
- Website: www.priory.e-sussex.sch.uk

Priory School is a British co-educational secondary school for 11- to 16-year-olds located on Mountfield Road in the East Sussex town of Lewes.

== History ==
=== Formation ===
Priory School was originally formed in 1969 when the Lewes County Grammar School for Girls, the Lewes County Grammar School for Boys and the Lewes Secondary Modern School were amalgamated to form a comprehensive school called Priory School, its name referring to the nearby Lewes Priory. At this point, although the school was comprehensive for children who lived within the town of Lewes, it was also open to children from the surrounding towns and villages who had passed the 11 plus. During this period there was also academic streaming: the names of the streamed groups were based on the letters of the word MOUNTFIELD.

=== Split site ===
In its early years (from 1969 until around 1980) the school was in three separate locations: the former Girls' Grammar School buildings in Potter's Lane housed the Lower School (ages 12–13), while on Mountfield Road the Secondary Modern buildings housed the Middle School (ages 14–15), with the Upper School (ages 16–18) in the former Boys' grammar school.

In 1970 the school entered a team into the Top of the Form radio competition. Susan Serns, Lynn Batchelor, Elizabeth Sharp, and Ruth Stanley were in the sixth form. The school team won against a boys team from Sutton Valence School. It was broadcast Saturday October 17, 1970.

=== Combined school ===
Later, in the early 1990s, Potter's Lane site was turned into a primary school now housing Southover and Western Road Schools; Priory School itself was split into Priory School (11–16) on the former Secondary Modern site and the Sixth Form (16-18), housed on the former Boys' Grammar School site, merged with Lewes Technical College, which had a site opposite in Mountfield Road, to become Lewes Tertiary College and now East Sussex College.

In 2017 the uniform was changed to prohibit new joiners from wearing skirts, and was said by the headteacher to be "gender-neutral". Multiple news outlets and alumni, including Piers Morgan criticised the move, stating that the restrictions were more of a contradiction than a progression in uniforms. This decision led to a protest by students in 2019 on the basis of environmental issues, after it was announced that the change would affect every student, as opposed to just the new joiners.

== Site ==
Priory School then became centred on the site of the former Secondary Modern School and new buildings have since been added. The adjacent buildings formerly used by the County Grammar School for Boys and by the Sixth Form have become part of the Lewes Campus of East Sussex College (further education). The chapel of the former Boys' Grammar School, was retained by the Priory School. This chapel was built after the Second World War to commemorate the boys from the school who fought in the war. Next to it is the music block, which was rebuilt in 2008 in place of a temporary one.

In 1993, the school opened with a new wing – the "South Block" – and a refurbished main building. The latter was the home of Lewes Secondary Modern School until 1969, with a distinctive copper-plated clock tower. The main building included new science labs, a library and design technology rooms, built in anticipation of design technology being in the National Curriculum. The South Block hosts, on the ground floor, the art, maths, modern foreign languages and English classrooms and on the first floor the humanities classrooms. The performing arts block was built next to the Main Hall.

The nearby leisure centre is used for indoor sports and the nearby Convent Fields, the cricket nets and the tennis courts, for outdoor ones. Between the South Block and the main building is a playground called the Quad.

== Arts ==
Priory has been awarded Arts and Language College statuses, specialising in these areas with increased funding. The three modern foreign languages taught are Spanish, French and German. There is also a Chinese club.

A number of pupils have gone on to make careers in the arts. Eric Goulden and Pete Thomas made their names in the music business. Annabel Abbs and Lucy Atkins have had a number of books published.

== Chapel ==
In 1960 a chapel, designed by Sir Edward Maufe, was built to honour the boys from the Lewes County Grammar School for Boys who died in the Second World War. Their names are shown on the walls of the vestibule, with the Latin motto "Dare Nec Computare" above the door, translating as "To give and not to count the cost".

== Notable former pupils ==
- Annabel Abbs, writer
- Lucy Atkins, writer
- John Authers, financial journalist
- Ralph Brown, actor
- Eric Goulden, musician
- Alex Hughes, Church of England priest and Archdeacon of Cambridge
- Tim Loughton, former Member of Parliament for East Worthing and Shoreham
- Piers Morgan, presenter, (named Piers Pughe-Morgan whilst at Priory)
- Lloyd Russell-Moyle, former Member of Parliament for Brighton Kemptown
- David Rutley, former Member of Parliament for Macclesfield
- Ronald Smith, musician
- Emma Tucker, national newspaper editor
- Graeme K Talboys, writer
- Pete Thomas, musician
