= William Goyen =

American writer, editor, and teacher

- Born: April 24, 1915; Trinity, Texas, U.S.
- Died: August 30, 1983 (aged 68); Los Angeles, California, U.S.
- Education: Rice Institute; University of Iowa (Ph.D.)
- Occupations: Novelist; short story writer; poet; playwright; editor; teacher
- Spouse: Doris Roberts (m. 1963)
- Writing career
- Period: Modernism
- Notable works: The House of Breath, A Book of Jesus, Arcadio

Charles William Goyen (April 24, 1915 – August 30, 1983) was an American novelist, short story writer, playwright, poet, editor, and teacher. Born in a small town in East Texas, these roots would influence his work for his entire life.

In World War II he served as an officer aboard an aircraft carrier in the South Pacific, where he began work on one of his most important and critically acclaimed books, The House of Breath. After the war and through the 1950s, he published short stories, collections of stories, other novels, and plays. He never achieved commercial success in America, but his translated work was highly regarded in Europe. During his life he could not completely support himself through his writing, so at various times he took work as an editor and teacher at several prominent universities. At one point he did not write fiction for several years, calling it a "relief" to not have to worry about his writing.

Major themes in his work include home and family, place, time, sexuality, isolation, and memory. His style of writing is not easily categorized, and he eschewed labels of genre placed on his works.

In 1963, he married Doris Roberts, the actress perhaps best known for her work in Everybody Loves Raymond; they remained together until his death in 1983.

== Biography ==
=== Early years ===
Goyen was born in the small town of Trinity, Texas, on April 24, 1915, to Charles Provine and Mary Inez (née Trow) Goyen. His father worked at the local sawmill, and his mother's family ran the post office.

He was the oldest of three children and thought to be epileptic; he "was subject to sudden and prolonged spells of crying." In 1923 he moved with his family to Houston. He resided in the Woodland Heights neighborhood, where he attended Travis Elementary School and Hogg Middle School. In 1932 he graduated from Sam Houston High School. He attended Rice Institute (now University), where he earned a BA in literature (1937) and an MA in comparative literature (1939). He briefly pursued a Ph.D. at the University of Iowa.

=== Career ===
Goyen taught for one year at the University of Houston in 1939, then joined in the U.S. Navy that same year. During World War II he served as an officer on the aircraft carrier USS Casablanca in the South Pacific. After the war he and Navy friend Walter Berns moved to Taos, New Mexico, where they lived near benefactor Frieda Lawrence (widow of D.H. Lawrence) to pursue writing. He traveled and lived at various times in New Mexico, Europe, New York, and California, living principally in New York.

From 1955 to 1960, he taught creative writing at the New School of Social Research, which provided opportunities for European travel and literary productivity. During the 1960s he taught at various universities, including Columbia, Princeton, and the University of Houston. From 1966 to 1971 he was a senior trade editor for McGraw-Hill, but resigned to return to his writing. In 1973 he was visiting professor of English at Brown University. He moved to Los Angeles in 1975 and lived there most of the rest of his life.

=== Personal life ===
Biographers have noted his sometimes excessive drinking, sometimes fragile mental state and ambiguous sexual orientation. His drinking at times became debilitating. Of his mental state when he would work, Goyen stated: "Ghost and Flesh ... you can see in those stories ... wow ... quite surreal and I loved those, and when that was finished and published, I kind of went off the beam. I think the book made me quite mad; writing it, the obsession of that book;…"

In 1951 he had an affair with writer Katherine Anne Porter, but their restored letters to each other during this time reveal "the convoluted nature" of their relationship, "one of the most hopeless of her life".

In the early 1950s for about ten years, William Goyen and artist Joseph Glasco lived and traveled in New Mexico, Pennsylvania and Europe together as partners. Their relationship is detailed in Michael Raeburn's biography of Joseph Glasco: Joseph Glasco: The Fifteenth American.

His interest in the theater and stage productions (original plays and adaptations of his own work) brought him into contact with the actress Doris Roberts, who starred in one of his plays. They married on November 10, 1963. In an interview after his death, Ms. Roberts said the greatest influence on her life was Goyen, referring to him as her "mentor".

In 1971, Goyen had a conversion experience, which he described in some detail:

What I found, or what found "me", was a very physical, touchable and touching Jesus. He was a man that touched and poked, patted and held and embraced. I had forgotten that he had stuck his finger in the ears of deaf people to make them hear; that he had spat in his hand and mixed clay with it to put on the eyes of blind people. A very touchable person seized me—the feeling was like love or lust: and it worked so swiftly that I was "turned", changed "at once".

This experience produced the nonfiction work, A Book of Jesus. Of this work Goyen said: "A very real man began to live with me, of flesh and blood. He did the same work on me that He did on the people of the New Testament that He walked among…."

=== Last years and death ===
In 1976 he joined Alcoholics Anonymous and stopped drinking altogether. His later years were among the most productive in his life. He died in Los Angeles of leukemia on August 30, 1983, aged 68, two months before his novel Arcadio was published.

== Writing ==
Goyen began writing what would become his first book, The House of Breath, when he served on an aircraft carrier during World War II. After the war he continued work on the novel and began writing short stories. His first published short story, "The White Rooster," appeared in Mademoiselle in April 1947. Other stories included "The Fallen Splendid House" in Southwest Review, in Spring 1949, and "A Bridge of Breath" in Partisan Review, in June 1949.

In 1948 he received a Literary Fellowship from Southwest Review. During this time he was also working on a translation from French of Albert Cossery's Les fainéants dans la vallée fertile (The Lazy Ones), which would be published in 1952. In 1950, his first book, The House of Breath, was received with critical acclaim and led to support through fellowships and awards.

In 1950–51, he lived in New York, Chicago, Houston, and New Mexico, while completing stories for what would be his first collection, Ghost and Flesh: Stories and Tales. About this time his work was being translated into German and French by Ernst Robert Curtius and Maurice Coindreau in Europe, where it remains in print in several languages and where he is highly regarded.

In the early 1950s he began to write plays and adaptations of his own works for the stage, and he eventually had several of his plays produced over many years: The Diamond Rattler (1960), Christy (1964), House of Breath Black/White (1971), and Aimee (1973). In 1954 the stage version of his first novel was produced off Broadway, and 1955 saw publication of his second novel, In a Farther Country, which had a hostile reception.

During this time he was becoming more involved in the theatre world and traveled back and forth between New York and New Mexico. In 1958 he revised the screenplay and wrote song lyrics for the Paul Newman film, The Left-Handed Gun. A comic novel, The Fair Sister, about two African-American families, was published in 1963, but it was pulled by the publisher after a reviewer in The New York Times Book Review called Goyen "insensitive".

He continued to have difficulty finding publishers and audiences for his work in America. He gave up his own writing when he was an editor with McGraw-Hill, from 1966 to 1971. He would later say about this time in his life: "There was no question of my own writing. I was relieved not to have to worry about my own writing." Following a conversion experience in 1971, he published the non-fiction work, A Book of Jesus, in 1973. A biographer later noted: "Jesus cost Goyen his editorial job."

His fourth novel, Come the Restorer, was published in 1974. This tale about a community's search for a savior Goyen called his "biggest accomplishment". His limited readership made commercial publishers wary, and even for Arcadio, his final novel, he had to search widely for an interested firm. By this time "no one would touch his writing."

Arcadio was published two months after his death in 1983. The book concerns a hermaphrodite who, in general terms, is seeking a way to reconcile the warring halves of his/her self. A posthumous publication included Half a Look of Cain: A Fantastical Narrative, which was written in the 1950s and early 1960s and was published in 1998.

== Style ==
Goyen is considered "a writer's writer". His East Texas origins and early childhood had an enduring influence on the speech patterns and cultural characteristics reflected in his writings, which are marked by the rhythms of rural speech, the Bible, and a sense of story and place.

His style has been compared to Virginia Woolf, William Faulkner, and Gabriel García Márquez. Biographer Peede notes that his works are known "for their incantatory passages, their fragmented brilliance, but not their seamless design." Critics have tried to define his style with labels such as Southern, Southern Gothic, modernist, postmodernist, contemporary, and magical realist. But Goyen insisted that his work should be considered outside any genre: "I'm really not very interested in contemporary fiction, anyway. I consider my fiction absolutely separate and apart from and unrelated to "contemporary American fiction."

== Themes ==
Recurring themes in Goyen's work include alienation (from self and from the world), isolation, loneliness, home and family, time, memory, spirituality, sexuality, and place.

For me, environment is all. Place ... is absolutely essential.

— William Goyen, Paris Review interview, 1975

== Awards and honors ==
Goyen was the recipient of several awards and fellowships. These include:

- Southwest Review Literary Fellowship, 1949
- MacMurray Award for best first novel by a Texan, 1950
- Guggenheim Fellowship, 1952 and 1954
- Ford Foundation grantee, 1963–64
- Music awards for words and music, the American Society of Composers, Authors, and Publishers (A.S.C.A.P.), 1964, 1965, 1968, 1970, and 1971
- Distinguished Alumnus Award, Rice University, 1977

== Legacy ==
The importance of Goyen's contribution to literature is not settled. Some critics have argued that he may yet prove to be one of the most distinctive literary voices of the 20th century. His books continued to remain in print in Europe long after they were unavailable in America.

In 2001, Doris Roberts established the Doris Roberts-William Goyen Fellowship in Fiction through the Christopher Isherwood Foundation. The monetary award is given annually and intended to support writers who have published at least one book of fiction, either a novel or a collection of stories.

== Selected list of works ==
=== Novels ===
- The House of Breath (1950)
- In a Farther Country (1952)
- The Fair Sister (1963)
- Come the Restorer (1974)
- Arcadio (1983)

=== Non-fiction ===
- A Book of Jesus (1973)
- Wonderful Plant (1980)

=== Short story collections ===
- Ghost and Flesh: Stories and Tales (1952)
- The Faces of Blood Kindred (1960)
- The Collected Stories (1975)
- Had I a Hundred Mouths (1988)

=== Plays ===
- The House of Breath (1956)
- The Diamond Rattler (1960)
- Christy (1964)
- House of Breath Black/White (1971)
- Aimee (1973)

=== Translation ===
- The Lazy Ones (author Albert Cossery) (1952)

=== Poetry ===
- Nine Poems (1976)
