= Aleksander Balos =

American painter

Aleksander Balos (born 1970) is a Romani-Polish-American artist and figurative painter, known for his classical photorealistic paintings depicting contemporary subject matter and narrative. He currently lives in the United States and is a naturalised American.

== Life and art ==
Aleksander Balos was born in Gliwice, Poland. His father Jan worked in an industrial factory and his mother Janina was a schoolteacher. Neither was a member of the Communist Party Polska Zjednoczona Partia Robotnicza or PZPR, and due to Jan’s candid criticisms of government policies during the 1980s, his name was placed on a list to be sent to a Soviet labor camp. Following Janina's death in 1982, Aleksander's health declined until he suffered a severe case of rheumatic fever which damaged his heart, rendering him medically housebound at age 14 for a period of six months. Due to his personal challenges and the overall socio-economic climate of mid-1980s Poland, Balos focused his attention over the next few years searching for a means to leave the country and emigrate to the West. In the summer of 1989 at the age of 18 he was able to relocate to the United States, after receiving a student visa to attend St. Joseph High School in Kenosha, Wisconsin. While there he received the encouragement of his art teacher Kathy Gagliardi, who assisted him in applying to colleges to study art.

Balos received a full scholarship to Cardinal Stritch University in Milwaukee WI, where he studied painting and drawing with Philosophy Professor Garry Rosine. After completing his BFA and experiencing his first museum show at Charles Allis Art Museum and exhibited at Northwestern Mutual Art Gallery at Cardinal Stritch as an Alumni in 2009. In 1995 Balos relocated to Chicago to study in the classical European atelier program at the School of Representational Art with Bruno Surdo and Mike Chelich. Here he primarily studied drawing and painting of the human form. In 1998, he exhibited his triptych Last Supper at Ann Nathan Gallery in Chicago, which led to subsequent shows in Chicago, as well as in other cities in the U.S. and Europe. Figurative realism and portraiture constituted most of the body of Balos' work in the '90s and early 2000s. During that time, Balos returned frequently to Europe to research painting techniques and contents of the old masters' paintings. Balos' work utilizes the human figure to portray various ideals and faults of human existence without suggesting solutions. The narrative compositions are intended to be interpreted by the audience, as only then the paintings gain their temporal and subjective meaning. While in Chicago, Balos also became an American citizen.

Since 1997 Balos has been represented by the Ann Nathan Gallery in Chicago, where he has held five solo exhibitions. Since 2000 Balos has contributed work to art gallery shows in New York, Atlanta, Chicago, Paris, Utrecht and Barcelona; and for art fairs such as The Armory Show in NY, Art Chicago, EXPO Chicago, Palm Beach3, Art Palm Beach, WWK Biennale in Munich, and the Royal Academy Summer Exhibition in London.

In 2005 Balos relocated to Northern California and since then his body of work has expanded to include looser applications, utilizing abstractions and multi-media techniques and styles. Balos also teaches drawing and painting privately at his atelier school ArtRoster in Mount Shasta, where his students host an annual "Forgery Show" on April 1 of each year.

In 2018 Balos started Vast Self, a 501(c)(3) public charity #83-1669166

== Distinctions ==
- Florence Biennale Invited to Florence Biennale 2007
- Forbes Trinchera Residency co-sponsored by American Artist magazine

== Publications ==
Nothing is Changing, oil painting on linen 36 x 66 inch by Aleksander Balos

- Metamorphosis 2, 2008
- Dreamscape 2, Netherlands 2008
- Direct Art Magazine, #13, NY, article Fall 2006
- The Departed, Martin Scorsese, 2005
- Who's Who in International Professionals, 2004
- Miroir de l’Art, Number 4, Paris, 2004
- NY Arts Magazine, his philosophy on art 2002
- G. Jurek Polanski, Parables, Artscopes.net, April 2001
- ArtNet, dealers selling his art 2000
- New American Paintings, Juried Exhibition in Print, Number 29, Open Studio Press, 2000
- G. Jurek Polanski, Mystical Realism of Eastern and Western Spirituality, Arscope.net, November 1999
- The Chicago Art Scene: Sixty-eight Contemporary Artists, Book, Crow Woods Publishing, 1998

== Notes and references ==
- Publishing, Firehouse (2014-03-20). The Art of Man - Volume 15 - eBook. Lulu Press, Inc. ISBN 9781940290232.
- Glossary: Figurative Tate online. Accessed May 22, 2006
- Glossary: Surreal Tate online. Accessed May 22, 2006
- Glossary: Representational Tate online. Accessed May 22, 2006
