= Peter Abbs =

English poet and academic (1942-2020)

- Born: 22 February 1948; Cromer, Norfolk, England
- Died: December 2025 (aged 83); London, England
- Education: University of Bristol
- Occupations: Poet, academic
- Website: www.peterabbs.net

Peter Francis Abbs (22 February 1942 – December 2020) was an English poet and academic, born in Cromer, Norfolk. He was the author of ten books of poetry and numerous works on the philosophy of education and creative writing. He was the father of writer Annabel Abbs.

== Early life ==
Second son of Eric Charles Abbs, a bus driver, and Mary (née Bullock), a shop assistant, Abbs was born at Cromer, and grew up on the North Norfolk coast. The bare landscape was to exert a significant influence on his later poetry, as was the walled garden at Upper Sheringham Hall, where his grandfather was head gardener. His mother was deeply committed to the Catholic faith and this influenced his boyhood desire to become a priest. After leaving St Joseph's School in Sheringham in 1954, Abbs travelled to Liverpool to join Saint Peter's College, a seminary run by the Mill Hill missionary fathers. However, he quickly became disillusioned and in 1956, with the active support of his father, he left to continue his education at Norwich Technical College. Here he completed his O- and A-levels and in 1961 began a joint degree in English and Philosophy at the University of Bristol, which he completed in 1963.

== Career ==
In 1964, inspired by progressive ideas in education, he trained as an English teacher, taking his first post at Filton High School, then a grammar school on the edge of Bristol. His first book, English for Diversity, proclaiming the power of creativity and imagination, drew largely from his experience there. After three years of teaching, Abbs took up his first academic position as a research fellow in the University of Wales in Aberystwyth (now the University of Aberystwyth), where he edited the independent quarterly journal Tract from 1971 to 1981. His time in Wales produced his first collection of poetry, For Man and Islands, as well as several works on English and education, including Autobiography in Education and Root and Blossom: the Philosophy, Practice and Politics of English Teaching.

In 1975 Abbs became Lecturer in Education at the University of Sussex. He took a DPhil from the university in 1986. The university was to become his permanent academic home. Committed to aesthetic education and the potency of Socratic learning, he became increasingly opposed to the dominant pedagogic instrumentalism of the day. In 1986 he began editing The Falmer Press Library of Aesthetic Education, a series of twelve volumes on the theory and practice of teaching the arts. The library proposed the radical idea that the six arts – drama, dance, art, music, film and literature – belonged together as a single community of expression and understanding, and that each discipline, seen both as an expressive and critical activity, should be represented in any balanced school curriculum.

While developing his pedagogical philosophy, Abbs continued to write poetry. In 1981 he published a 'sonnet autobiography', Icons of Time, which was particularly praised for the long sequence on the poet's relationship with his father. It was followed in 1995 by Personae and in 1999 by Love after Sappho; both collections ranged widely across the western tradition of poetry and philosophy. In his poetry and in his poetics Abbs has consistently urged the need for musical cadence, metaphysical imagination and historic continuity. In later work, Viva la Vida (2005), The Flowering of Flint (2007), and Voyaging Out (2009), these elements found a further union, both sparse and wide-ranging.

In 2000, he became poetry editor of Resurgence and helped produce one of the first anthologies of eco-poetry, Earth Songs.

In 2002, having been made the first Professor of Arts Education and then Professor of Creative Writing, Abbs took up a new role within the Humanities department at Sussex, where he directed a D.Phil. programme in creative writing. During this period Abbs wrote his most passionate defence of what he saw as authentic education: Against the Flow. This sets out his critique of the encroaching managerialism in the organisation of schools and, drawing on both seminal principle and good practice, posited a bold alternative: education for wholeness of being and the creative life.

Drawing on his doctorate The Development of Autobiography in Western Culture from Augustine to Rousseau (1986), Abbs's ongoing project, The Story of the Self, is a critical history of Western notions of selfhood. The work focuses on key figures who have shaped the tradition of introspection and reflexivity. Related essays on Augustine, Dante, Petrarch, Montaigne, Rousseau, Nietzsche, Freud and Jung have already appeared in recent issues of The London Magazine.

Abbs retired in 2006 and became Emeritus Professor of Creative Writing at the University of Sussex.

In 1963, Abbs married Barbara Beazeley; they had a son, Theodore, and two daughters, Annabel and Miranda, before divorcing in 2002.

He died in December 2020, at the age of 78.

== Bibliography ==
=== Poetry ===
- Abbs, Peter (1978). For man and islands.
- 1981 Songs of a New Taliesin, Poems by Peter Abbs & Prints by Nicholas Parry. The Gryphon Press. Limited edition of Autumn 1981.
- 1991 Icons of Time
- 1995 Personae
- 1996 Angelic Imagination
- 1999 Love After Sappho
- 2002 Earth Songs: a Resurgence Anthology of Contemporary Eco-poetry
- 2005 Viva La Vida
- 2007 The Flowering of Flint (Collected poems)
- 2008 The Greater Journey (with John Pack)
- 2009 Voyaging Out

=== Non fiction ===
- 1969 English for Diversity
- 1974 Autobiography in Education
- 1975 (Ed) The Black Rainbow: essays on the present breakdown of culture
- 1976 Root and Blossom: the Philosophy, Practice and Politics of English Teaching
- 1977 Proposal for a New College (co-authored with Graham Carey [1932–2012])
- 1979 Reclamations: Essays on Culture, Mass Culture and the Curriculum
- 1982 English Within the Arts
- 1983 (Ed) 'Introduction' to Father and Son by Edmund Gosse
- 1987 (Ed) Living Powers: the arts in education
- 1988 A is for Aesthetic: Essays on Creative and Aesthetic Education
- 1989 (Ed) The Symbolic Order: a contemporary reader on the arts debate
- 1990 The Forms of Poetry (with John Richardson)
- 1990 The Forms of Narrative (with John Richardson)
- 1994 The Educational Imperative: In Defence of Socratic and Aesthetic Learning
- 1996 The Polemics of Imagination
- 2003 Against the Flow: Education, the Arts and Postmodern Culture
- Abbs, Peter (Jun–Jul 2014). "William Blake and the forging of the creative self". The London Magazine: 49–62.
