= Bundeskunstsammlung =

Modern-artwork collection Germany's government holds

The Bundeskunstsammlung (Sammlung zeitgenössischer Kunst der Bundesrepublik Deutschland) – The Federal Collection of Contemporary Art, is a collection of modern works of art held by the government of the Federal Republic of Germany.

Based on the principle that creative arts play an important role in democratic society, the collection was founded in 1970 by Chancellor Willy Brandt acting on a proposal by the then chairman of the German Federation of Artists. The collection does not have a central, permanent home; instead, the works are exhibited in various museums and government offices throughout the country. An independent commission, whose members serve for five years, selects the acquisitions.

As of 2020, the collection encompasses 1,700 works of Isa Genzken, Thomas Struth, Olafur Eliasson, Jonathan Monk, Georg Baselitz, Markus Lüpertz, A. R. Penck, Markus Oehlen, Gerhard Richter, Wolfgang Tillmans and others. Its annual budget usually does not exceed €500,000. From 2012 until 2020, the collection acquired a total of 300 works for 2.7 million euros. In 2020, it pledged to acquire around 150 works worth 3 million in total in a bid to help artists and galleries overcome the economic impact of the COVID-19 pandemic in Germany.
