= Stéphane Ducret =

Swiss artist

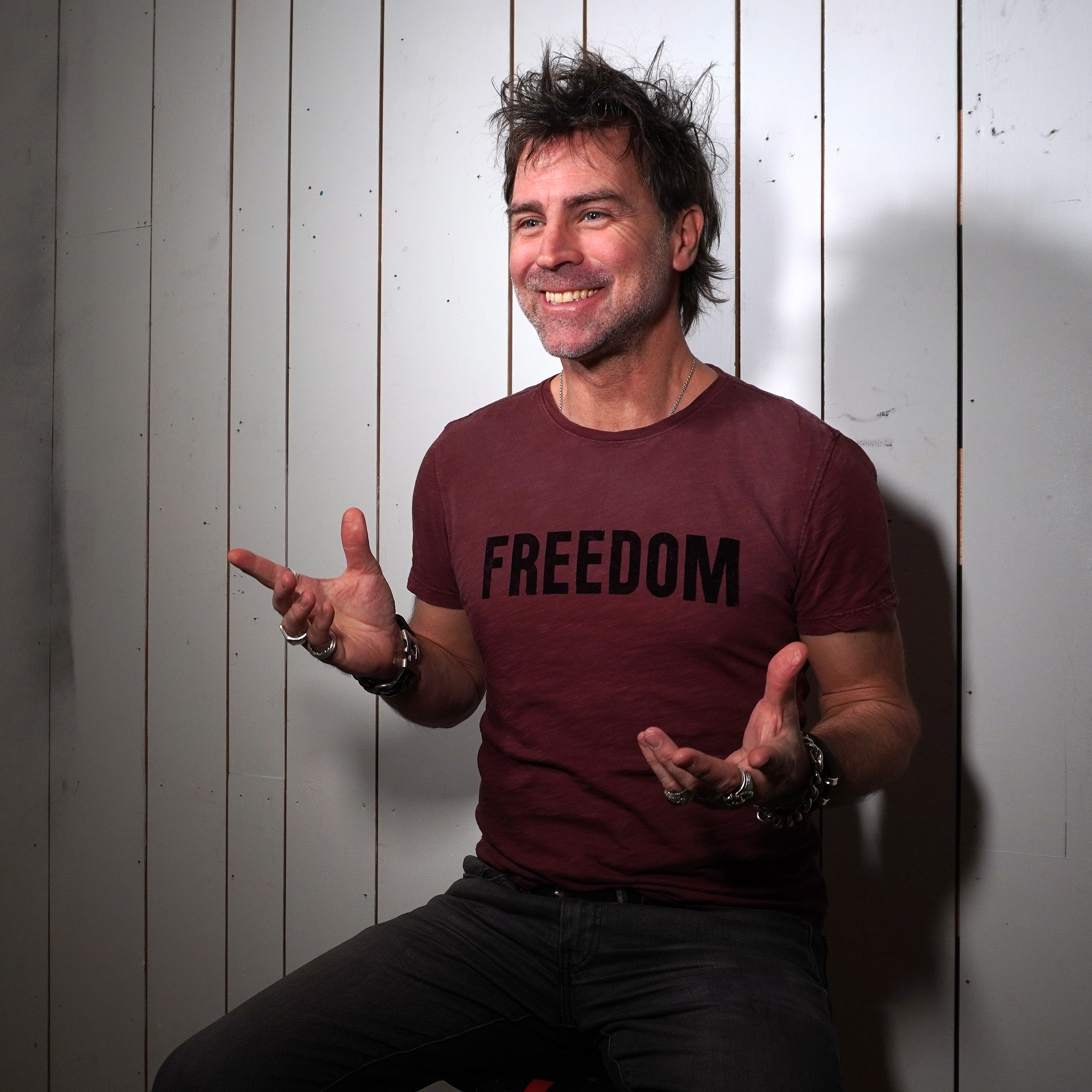
- Born: 1970 (age 55–56); Lausanne, Switzerland
- Education: Geneva University of Art
- Occupation: contemporary artist
- Known for: teacher, École cantonale d'art de Lausanne (ÉCAL)
- Notable work: develops art classes for adults

Stéphane Ducret (born 1970) is a Swiss contemporary artist born in 1970 in Lausanne, Switzerland, and living in Geneva, Switzerland since 2012.

== Life ==
Ducret was Silvie Defraoui's, Gilles Porret's and Christian Marclay's pupil at the Geneva University of Art (HEAD, or ex ESAV). He was commissioned to make large-scale paintings by the Geneva Hospital (1998) and by the Geneva International Conference Center (1999) before moving to New York City. He showed his work at the Bronx Museum of the Arts (2000) among others, and founded the Point Gallery (2000–2002). He now lives and works in Geneva after having lived in New York, Porto and Buenos Aires.

== Work ==
Stéphane Ducret is a Visual Artist, born in 1970 in Lausanne, awarded in 2003 by the Leenaards Fondation, an Art Teacher and Coach based in Geneva. He holds a Master in Art and Art History from the Ecole Supérieure d’Art Visuel de Genève (now renamed HEAD).

His work has been exhibited at The Bronx Museum of the Arts, New York; Forum d’Art Contemporain, Sierre; Fondation de l’Hermitage, Lausanne; Centro Cultural Borges, Buenos Aires; Centre PasquArt, Bienne; Musée cantonal des beaux-arts, Lausanne; The Artists Space, New York and his artworks are part of the collections BCV ART, CICG, AXA Assurances, Fonds cantonal d’art de Genève, Fonds des arts plastiques de Lausanne, Hôpital universitaire de Genève, Musée de Pully among others.

Ducret has had art residencies in New York, Porto, Buenos Aires and Mexico City. From 2002 to 2006, he has been a member of the direction of École cantonale d'art de Lausanne (ÉCAL), where he was a teacher and in charge of the proficiency program. He founded two art galleries, one in New York and the other in Geneva and he has been the director of l'elac (l'espace lausannois d'art contemporain).

From 2016, he develops « ART CLASSE par Stéphane Ducret » (www.artclasse.com) for adults, children and corporates, in order to respond to an increased and diverse demand around contemporary art. ART CLASSE’s wide range of propositions include: creativity workshops such as the REAL/FAKE workshops (a painting class in Switzerland, where the participants create their own « real/fake » artwork to bring home, based on the practices of contemporary artists), for clients such as Audemars Piguet, Banques Mirabaud and Pictet, JTI, etc.; coaching for artists and future gallery owners; international trips focused on contemporary art and « Art Advisory » for collectors who want to form a coherent contemporary art collection.
