= Tullah Hanley =

Hungarian-Egyptian dancer and art collector (1924–1992)

- Born: Tullah Innes; 1924
- Died: June 2, 1992
- Occupations: Dancer, writer, art collector, philanthropist

Tullah Hanley (née Innes; 1924 – June 2, 1992) was a Hungarian-Egyptian dancer, writer, art collector, and philanthropist. She began her career as an exotic dancer in Hungary before immigrating to the United States in 1945. She married oil and gas heir T. Edward Hanley in 1948, and following his death in 1969, she donated hundreds of artworks from their collection to museums. She later established a youth center and founded the Tullah Hanley Youth Foundation. She also wrote the books The Strange Triangle of G. B. S. (1956) and Love of Art and the Art of Love (1975).

== Life and career ==
=== Early life and career ===
Tullah Innes was born in Egypt and raised in Hungary. Her mother was Egyptian, and her Hungarian father worked as a building contractor. She had an older sister and a younger sister. Following her father's death when she was 6, the family experienced financial hardship.

Tullah was educated in Hungary and Switzerland and spoke five languages. She began dancing at 15 and performed classical Egyptian and African dances in music halls, vaudeville theaters, and nightclubs.

Tullah and her sister, Amy Innes, immigrated to the United States in 1945. They initially had difficulty entering the country, but they were eventually admitted after performing their act.

=== Marriage, art, and lectures ===
While dancing at McVan's Night Club in Buffalo, she met Thomas Edward Hanley, a wealthy oil and gas well developer from Pennsylvania, in 1945. They were introduced by artist Tony Sisti, whom Hanley had hired to find paintings for his art collection. He then commissioned an artist to paint Tullah's portrait, beginning a three-year courtship during which she continued performing in nightclubs across the country.

After Hanley divorced his first wife, a Philadelphia socialite, Tullah married him in New York City in 1948. Her sister Amy moved in with the couple at their home in Bradford, Pennsylvania. Their marriage attracted attention in Bradford, where residents regarded Tullah as a stripper because of her dancing career.

Her book The Strange Triangle of G. B. S. was published in 1956. It's a novel about the love triangle involving writer George Bernard Shaw and actress Janet Achurch.

Tullah helped her husband acquire paintings for their collection, which, along with thousands of rare books and manuscripts, was housed in their Bradford home. She studied art history and developed extensive knowledge of art. In the 1960s, she persuaded her husband to exhibit the paintings and began a second career as a socialite and lecturer. Known for her outspoken personality and flamboyant attire; she led tours of the collection and delivered lectures covering topics such as love, sex, health, and marriage.

She stated that her husband had given her his collection as a wedding gift and reaffirmed the gift in a letter in 1963. She had declined to formally accept it on both occasions because of the gift taxes involved. Following his death in 1969, she accepted the collection so that she could sell selected paintings to pay the inheritance taxes on his $15 million estate. She donated a substantial portion of the collection to museums.

=== Philanthropy and later life ===
1970, Tullah was diagnosed with breast cancer and advised to undergo a mastectomy. She declined and instead had the tumor surgically removed at the New York office of a Hungarian physician friend.

Tullah supported the youth in Bradford, offering assistance with medical expenses and clothing. She counseled young people on drug use, sexual health, and personal hygiene, and sometimes accompanied them to doctors. Tullah also said she offered to pay for abortions for girls under 16 with parental consent. A Bradford resident described her as someone teenagers approached for advice when they could not turn to their parents.

In June 1972, Tullah opened the Hanley Creative Youth Center, which offered art, music, and dance classes to local teenagers. She had purchased the former Joseph Marks Furniture Store at 24 Main Street in Bradford for $32,000 to establish the center. The first floor was an art gallery, which sold work from her collection to help finance the center. Tullah performed at the opening in a sheer crocheted pantsuit before changing into a G-string, a skimpy bra, and a decorative veil.

In October 1972, Tullah was charged with "operating a disorderly house and corrupting the morals of a minor" and released on $1,000 bail. She expressed surprise at the charges, saying she had contacted authorities to investigate suspected drug use and underage drinking at the center. Tullah closed the youth center but continued operating the art gallery until September 1973. She attributed pressure to close the center to opposition from local authorities and the building's failure to meet certain state regulations.

In 1975, Tullah purchased the former Elks Club and founded the Tullah Hanley Youth Foundation in Bradford. Through the foundation, she provided loans to businesses to help them hire young people. She also financed vocational and technical training for people aged 17 to 30.

Tullah published her autobiography, Love of Art and the Art of Love, through Minneapolis-based Piper Publishers in 1975. That fall, she embarked on a national book tour to promote it. Although she was a major patron of the de Young Museum in San Francisco, the institution declined to host a book signing, due to the book's risqué content.

In her later years, Tullah supported higher education by setting up scholarships. In 1989, the University of Pittsburgh honored her at the dedication of its new $3.5 million library at the Bradford campus. She contributed $1.3 million toward the library, including $75,000 in artworks donated in memory of her husband.

In 1990, she offered to pay liability insurance costs so that the city of Bradford could lift its ban on skateboarding.

== Death ==
Tullah Hanley died on June 2, 1992, at Bradford Regional Hospital in Bradford, Pennsylvania, after experiencing difficulty breathing. She was buried in the Hanley mausoleum at St. Bernard Cemetery.

== The Hanley collection ==
T. Edward Hanley began collecting art while he was a Harvard college student, purchasing works on the installment plan with his allowance. His acquisitions included American artists such as Rembrandt Peale, John Wesley Jarvis, Gilbert Stuart, and Winslow Homer, and French artists associated with Impressionism and Post-Impressionism, such as Édouard Manet, Edgar Degas, Pierre-Auguste Renoir, Henri de Toulouse-Lautrec, Gustave Courbet, and Vincent van Gogh. His collection also featured Georges Seurat, Paul Cézanne, Paul Gauguin, Henri Matisse, Marc Chagall, and Raoul Dufy.

Tullah Hanley became actively involved in her husband's collecting, developing an interest in modern art and studying the collection. "In time I became an art junkie myself. I became addicted like Edward," she later recalled. She added more than 300 pieces to the collection, which comprised nearly 900 works.

In 1967, the first exhibition dedicated to the Hanley collection was mounted at New York's Gallery of Modern Art, located at 2 Columbus Circle. Art critic John Canaday of The New York Times wrote that "Hanley has accumulated a mass of art that certainly must be the most varied, and might be the most personal, of major private collections in this country. … If the entire Hanley collection were exhibited, this collector would probably emerge as a wonderful hybrid between an intellectual packrat and a pure connoisseur."

In August 1968, 14 paintings and two statues were stolen from the Hanley collection at their home in Bradford, including Pablo Picasso's Au Moulin Rouge, valued at $500,000. The stolen items, estimated to be worth a total of $1.3 million, were recovered without appreciable damage. The Buffalo Mafia orchestrated the theft under the oversight of crime boss Stefano Magaddino. In January 1969, three men and a woman were convicted in federal court in Buffalo, New York of transporting the stolen artworks across state lines.

After her husband's death, 127 paintings and sculptures from the Hanley collection was displayed for the benefit of the Bradford Young Women's Christian Association (YWCA) in May 1969. Later that year, there was an exhibition at Canisius College in Buffalo.

In September 1969, Tullah donated more than 90 paintings, valued at approximately $1 million, to the Denver Art Museum. The artworks included pieces by Picasso, James McNeill Whistler, Toulouse-Lautrec, and Gilbert Stuart. The paintings were displayed in the museum's new headquarters, completed in 1971.

In January 1970, Tullah donated 211 artworks to the M. H. de Young Memorial Museum in San Francisco. She "disinherited" the Philadelphia Museum of Art after a disagreement over the timing of the transfer. Museum president George M. Cheston disputed her account, noting that the institution had received paintings from the collection both before and after her husband's death. Tullah said the works intended for Philadelphia instead gone to San Francisco, while she kept several paintings to sell to cover inheritance taxes on her husband's estate.

In October 1970, Tullah organized a celebration that attracted over 9,000 visitors for the preview of the Hanley collection at the M. H. de Young Memorial Museum. The event featured nude art students covered in body paint, magicians, puppeteers, fire eaters, and rock bands. Tullah appeared in five different see-through costumes and belly danced. She was presented with the "Best Bottom" award by Jennie Lee "the Bazoom Girl," who was president of the Exotic Dancer's League of America. Among the artworks exhibited were Seated Woman by Picasso; Bermuda Window by Marsden Hartley; Nude Boy Flute Player by Albert Pinkham Ryder; Boy Driving a Hay Wagon by Andrew Wyeth; Loper's Coat by Henry Moore; bronzes and drawings by Gaston Lachaise. There were also works by Matisse, Renoir, Degas, Mary Cassatt, Édouard Manet, and Salvador Dalí.

In 1972, 350 artworks from the Hanley collection were offered for sale at Tullah's art gallery to benefit the Hanley Creative Youth Center in Bradford. She also planned to sell the remaining 600 pieces from the collection displayed at her Bradford home and New York apartment to expand the center to other cities. However, the center closed after only a few months.
