= Frieda Lawrence =

German baroness, wife of D. H. Lawrence

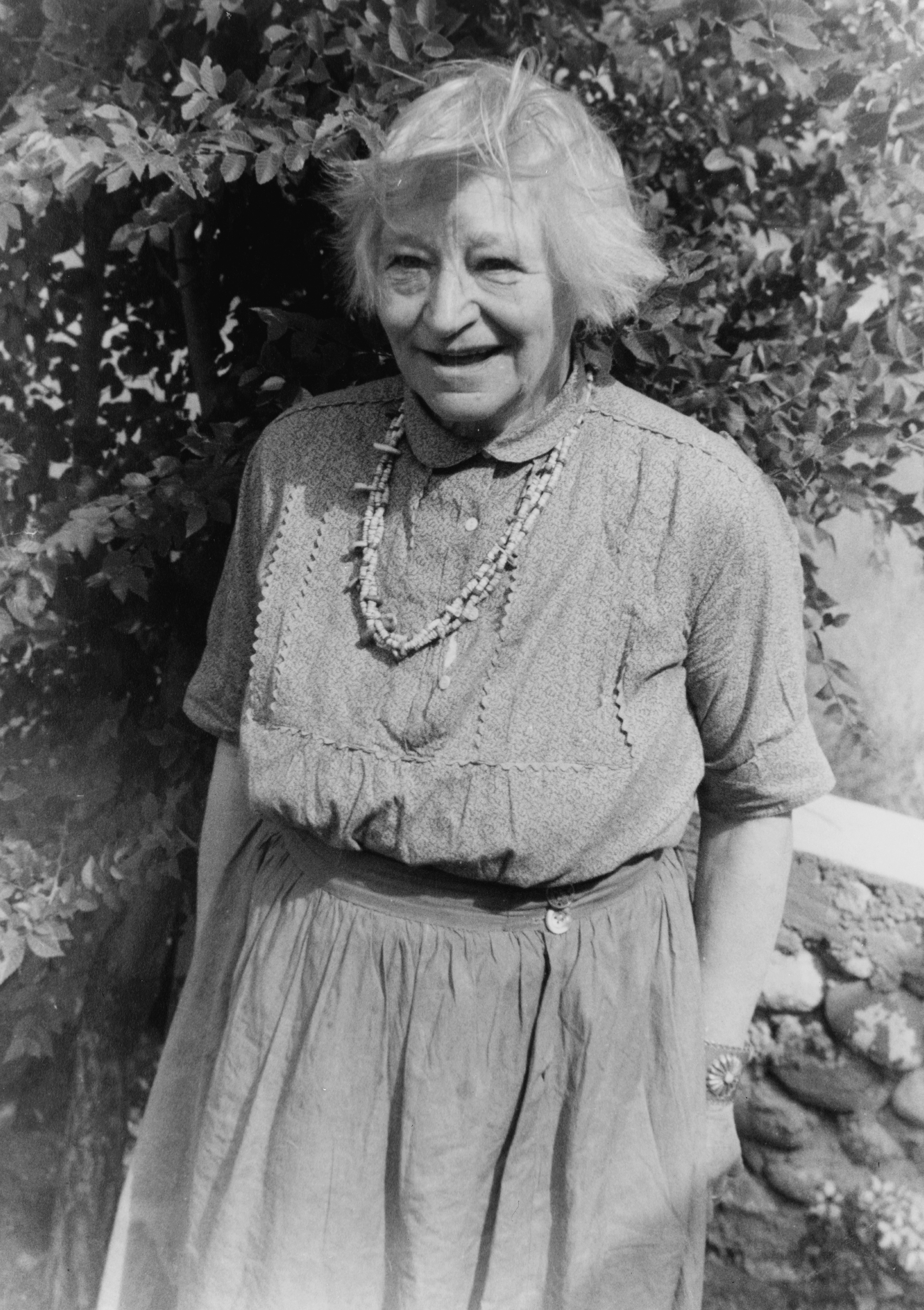
- Lawrence in 1950, photographed by Carl Van Vechten
- Born: Emma Maria Frieda Johanna Freiin von Richthofen; August 11, 1879; Metz, Alsace-Lorraine, German Empire (now in Grand Est, France)
- Died: August 11, 1956 (aged 77); Taos, New Mexico, U.S.
- Spouse(s): Ernest Weekley (m. 1899; div. 1913) D. H. Lawrence (m. 1914; died 1930) Angelo Ravagli (m. 1950)
- Children: 3
- Relatives: Else von Richthofen (sister)

Frieda Lawrence (August 11, 1879 – August 11, 1956) was a German author and wife of the British novelist D. H. Lawrence.

== Life ==
Emma Maria Frieda Johanna Freiin von Richthofen (also known under her married names as Frieda Weekley, Frieda Lawrence, and Frieda Lawrence Ravagli) was born at Metz into the Heinersdorf line of the Richthofen family. Her father was Baron Friedrich Ernst Emil Ludwig von Richthofen (1844–1916), an engineer in the Imperial German Army, and her mother was Anna Elise Lydia Marquier (1852–1930). Her elder sister was the economist and social scientist Else von Richthofen. She was a distant cousin of Manfred von Richthofen, the "Red Baron".

In 1899, she married a British philologist and professor of modern languages, Ernest Weekley, who was some fourteen years her senior, with whom she had three children, Charles Montague (born 1900), Elsa Agnès (born 1902) and Barbara Joy (born 1904). They settled in Nottingham, where Ernest was an academic at the university. During her marriage to Weekley she began to translate German literature, mainly fairy tales, into English.

In 1912 she met D. H. Lawrence, a former student of her husband; she and Lawrence soon fell in love and eloped to Germany. During their stay Lawrence was arrested for spying; after the intervention of Frieda's father, the couple walked south over the Alps to Italy. In 1914, following her divorce, Frieda and Lawrence married. She had to leave her children with Weekley, because, as the adulterous respondent to a divorce instigated by her husband, she was not legally able to gain custody unless he consented.

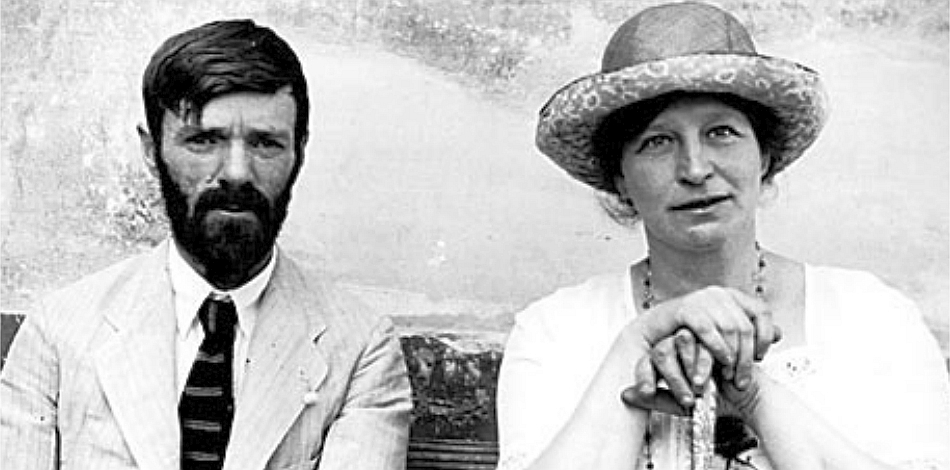
D. H. Lawrence and Frieda (1914)

They had intended to return to the continent, but the outbreak of war kept them in England, where they endured official harassment and censorship. They also struggled with limited resources and Lawrence's already frail health.

Leaving postwar England at the earliest opportunity, they traveled widely, eventually settling at the Kiowa Ranch near Taos, New Mexico, and in Lawrence's last years at the Villa Mirenda, near Scandicci in Tuscany. After her husband's death in Vence, France, in 1930, she returned to Taos to live with her third husband, Angelo Ravagli. The ranch is now owned by the University of New Mexico at Albuquerque.

Georgia O'Keeffe, who knew her in Taos, said in 1974: "Frieda was very special. I can remember very clearly the first time I ever saw her, standing in a doorway, with her hair all frizzed out, wearing a cheap red calico dress that looked as though she'd just wiped out the frying pan with it. She was not thin, and not young, but there was something radiant and wonderful about her."

Joseph Glasco became close friends with Frieda when he and William Goyen lived together in Taos in the 1950s. At one point, Frieda asked Glasco to arrange an exhibition of D. H. Lawrence's paintings. They remained friends until her death in 1956.

Mainly through her elder sister, Frieda became acquainted with many intellectuals and authors, including the socioeconomist Alfred Weber and sociologist Max Weber, the radical psychoanalyst Otto Gross (who became her lover), and the writer Fanny zu Reventlow.

=== Lady Chatterley's Lover ===
D.H. Lawrence's Lady Chatterley's Lover is thought to be based partly on Frieda Lawrence's relationship as an aristocrat with the working-class Lawrence. John Harte's dramatisation led to its being Lawrence's only novel to be staged. She loved the play when she read it and supported its staging, but the copyright to Lawrence's story had already been acquired by Baron Philippe de Rothschild, a close friend. He did not relinquish it until 1960, after the film version had been released. John Harte's play was first produced at the Arts Theatre in London in 1961, five years after her death.

== Death ==
Frieda Lawrence died on her seventy-seventh birthday in Taos.

== In popular culture ==
Frieda Lawrence's life inspired the biographical novel Frieda: The Original Lady Chatterley (Two Roads, 2018), by Annabel Abbs. The novel was a Times Book of the Month, then a Times Book of the Year 2018. Abbs also wrote about Lawrence's love for walking and the great outdoors in Windswept: Walking in the Footsteps of Remarkable Women (Two Roads, 2021).

In the 1985 British television movie Coming Through about Weekley and Lawrence's affair, Helen Mirren portrayed Frieda Weekley.

She is an important character in On the Rocks, a play by Amy Rosenthal that deals with her sometimes difficult relationship with D. H. Lawrence.

She is played by Judy Cornwell in "Private Affairs: Mrs. Weekley's Lover" 1975 (TV Episode) by Fay Weldon; Directed by Don Taylor; With Michael Kitchen as D.H. Lawrence and Michael Bryant as Ernest Weekley.

Lawrence was the inspiration for the character Harriet Somers, played by Judy Davis in the Australian film Kangaroo (1986). The film is based on D. H. Lawrence's semi-autobiographical novel of the same name.

== Bibliography ==
=== Autobiography ===
- Lawrence, Frieda von Richthofen. Not I, but the Wind... With an afterword by Harry T. Moore. New York: Viking, 1934.
  - Reprint. Carbondale: Southern Illinois University Press, 1974. LCCN 74-8660 ISBN 0809306905.

=== Biographies ===
- Byrne, Janet. A Genius for Living: The Life of Frieda Lawrence. New York: HarperCollins, 1995. ISBN 0060190019.
- Crotch, Martha Gordon. Memories of Frieda Lawrence. Edinburgh: Tragara Press, 1975. ISBN 0902616196.
- Green, Martin. The von Richthofen Sisters: The Triumphant and the Tragic Modes of Love: Else and Frieda Von Richthofen, Otto Gross, Max Weber, and D.H. Lawrence, in the Years 1870–1970. New York: Basic Books, 1974. ISBN 0465090508.
- Jackson, Rosie. Frieda Lawrence (Including Not I, But the Wind and other autobiographical writings). London and San Francisco: Pandora, an imprint of HarperCollins Publishers, 1994.
- Lawrence, Frieda von Richthofen, Harry T. Moore, and Dale B. Montague, eds. Frieda Lawrence and Her Circle: Letters from, to, and About Frieda Lawrence. London: Macmillan, 1981. ISBN 0333276000.
- Lucas, Robert. Frieda Lawrence: The Story of Frieda Von Richthofen and D. H. Lawrence. New York: Viking Press, 1973.
- Patmore, Brigit. "A Memoir of Frieda Lawrence". Moore, Harry T., ed. A D. H. Lawrence Miscellany. London: Heinemann, 1961, pp. 136-139.
- Squires, Michael, and Talbot, Lynn K. Living at the Edge: A Biography of D.H. Lawrence and Frieda Von Richthofen. Madison, Wisconsin: The University of Wisconsin Press, 2002.
- Squires, Michael. D. H. Lawrence and Frieda: A Portrait of Love and Loyalty. London: Welbeck Publishing Group Limited, 2008.
- Squires, Michael. The Limits of Love: The Lives of D. H. Lawrence and Frieda Von Richthofen. Baton Rouge: Louisiana State University Press, 2023 ("originated, in part, from D. H. Lawrence and Frieda: A Portrait of Love and Loyalty").
- Tedlock, Jr., E. W., ed. Frieda Lawrence: The Memoirs and Correspondence. New York: Alfred A. Knopf, 1964.
