= List of works by Georgette Heyer =

Georgette Heyer bibliography
- Georgian novels↙: 8
- Regency novels↙: 26
- Other historical novels↙: 6
- Contemporary novels↙: 4
- Detective novels↙: 12
- Essays↙: 2

Georgette Heyer (1902–1974) was an English author particularly known for her historical romance novels set in the Regency and Georgian eras. A best-selling author, Heyer's writing career saw her produce works from a variety of genres; in total she published 32 novels in the romance genre, 6 historical novels, 4 contemporary novels, and 12 in the detective fiction genre.

Born in Wimbledon, London, the nineteen-year-old Heyer published her first novel, The Black Moth, in 1921 from a story she had written for her haemophiliac younger brother Boris. The Georgian novel, which featured an earl who turns to outlawry in the 18th century, set the template for many of her future stories – romance, a historical setting, characters from the nobility, and a "saturnine" male lead. The Black Moth was popular with readers and Heyer continued to publish more Georgian novels until the release of Faro's Daughter in 1941.

Heyer's fame stemmed mainly from her Regency novels, which made her a household name. The first, Regency Buck, became a best-seller when it was published in 1935, and featured a wealthy heiress from the English countryside, whose sense of independence causes her to clash with London's social norms, but eventually conform to them – qualities seen in many other Heyer heroines. Gradually, Heyer developed a "distinct, light-hearted" style, and her 1940 Regency novel The Corinthian established elements common in her future works: clever plotting, light comedic elements, and a writing style reminiscent of the Regency era. After 1940 her output consisted mainly of Regency novels, a collection of works that totalled 26 by the time of her death in 1974.

Heyer was noted for the thorough historical detail she invested in her works – unlike her literary predecessors, who typically lived in the eras they wrote about, Heyer had to enliven the past for her contemporary readers; she thus endeavoured to research every available aspect of her chosen plot settings. Despite the popularity of her romance novels, Heyer did not consider herself a romance writer and had ambivalent feelings towards the genre, once dismissing her stories as "another bleeding romance." Heyer published historical novels such as The Conqueror (1931), which depicted the early years of William I. The careful detail found in her 1937 historical romance, An Infamous Army, attracted critical acclaim. Her other novels never reached this level of positive critical opinion and have been largely overlooked by scholars. Heyer aspired for many years to produce "the magnum opus of my latter years," a medieval trilogy featuring the House of Lancaster. This project failed to come to full fruition, as she faced pressure from eager readers to continue publishing her popular romance novels; the tax liabilities she dealt with were also a factor. Heyer's only instalment of the Lancaster trilogy, My Lord John (1975), went unfinished and was published a year after her death.

Early in her career, Heyer experimented with other literary genres, resulting in the release of four serious contemporary novels between 1922 and 1930, all of which enjoyed multiple reprints though were not as successful as her historical novels of the time, and were later suppressed by the author.

With the help of her husband George Ronald Rougier, who devised the murder method in most of her detective novels, Heyer also delved into works of contemporary detective fiction such as Footsteps in the Dark (1932) and They Found Him Dead (1937). In total she published 12 in the genre between 1932 and 1953, when her final detective novel Detection Unlimited appeared. In most of the books, detectives from Scotland Yard are called in. They are treated seriously and solve the case, sometimes with help from one of the characters.

Heyer's romance novels sold in huge numbers (one million a year in paperback in the 1970s) and had been translated into more than 10 languages by the time of her death. She is mostly remembered for these works, rather than for her efforts in other literary genres. Heyer has been credited with "virtually invent[ing]" the Regency romance novel and its "comedy of manners," a literary form in turn influenced by Jane Austen. Heyer described herself as "a mixture of [Samuel] Johnson and Austen," and according to the scholar Mary Joannou, Austen's influence on Heyer is clear: both wrote of the Regency era and focused on marriage to drive the plot. Pamela Regis cites Heyer's influence in every historical romance novel published since 1921, and Elizabeth Spillman adds that because Heyer wrote romances for five decades, "her writing career spans the emerging of the romance as a publishing category and she was influential in shaping that genre." Widely read today, most of Heyer's works are still in print and adaptations have been made on film, television, stage, and radio.

== Georgian novels ==
The Georgian novels of Georgette Heyer
Title	Date of first publication	First edition publisher	Ref.
The Black Moth	1921	Constable (London)	
The Transformation of Philip Jettan (later republished as Powder and Patch)	1923	Mills & Boon (London)	
These Old Shades	1926	William Heinemann (London)	
The Masqueraders	1928	William Heinemann (London)	
Devil's Cub	1932	William Heinemann (London)	
The Convenient Marriage	1934	William Heinemann (London)	
The Talisman Ring	1936	William Heinemann (London)	
Faro's Daughter	1941	William Heinemann (London)	

== Regency novels ==
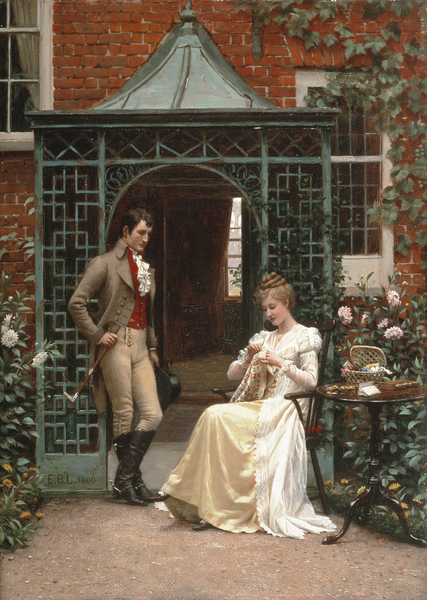
Many of Heyer's novels featured romance in the Regency era

The Regency novels of Georgette Heyer
Title	Date of first publication	First edition publisher	Ref.
Regency Buck	1935	William Heinemann (London)	
An Infamous Army	1937	William Heinemann (London)	
The Spanish Bride	1940	William Heinemann (London)	
The Corinthian	1940	William Heinemann (London)	
Friday's Child	1944	William Heinemann (London)	
The Reluctant Widow	1946	William Heinemann (London)	
The Foundling	1948	William Heinemann (London)	
Arabella	1949	William Heinemann (London)	
The Grand Sophy	1950	William Heinemann (London)	
The Quiet Gentleman	1951	William Heinemann (London)	
Cotillion	1953	William Heinemann (London)	
The Toll-Gate	1954	William Heinemann (London)	
Bath Tangle	1955	William Heinemann (London)	
Sprig Muslin	1956	William Heinemann (London)	
April Lady	1957	William Heinemann (London)	
Sylvester, or the Wicked Uncle	1957	William Heinemann (London)	
Venetia	1958	William Heinemann (London)	
The Unknown Ajax	1959	William Heinemann (London)	
A Civil Contract	1961	William Heinemann (London)	
The Nonesuch	1962	William Heinemann (London)	
False Colours	1963	The Bodley Head (London)	
Frederica	1965	The Bodley Head (London)	
Black Sheep	1966	The Bodley Head (London)	
Cousin Kate	1968	The Bodley Head (London)	
Charity Girl	1970	The Bodley Head (London)	
Lady of Quality	1972	The Bodley Head (London)	

== Other historical novels ==
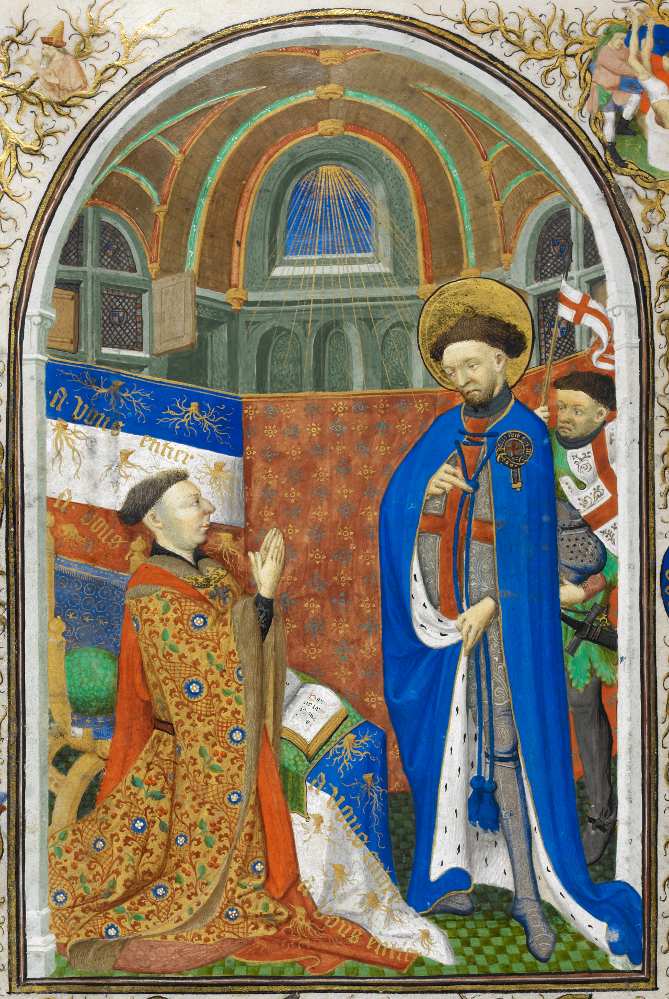
Heyer's final novel, My Lord John, featured John of Lancaster (pictured on the left), brother of Henry V

The other historical novels of Georgette Heyer
Title	Date of first publication	First edition publisher	Ref.
The Great Roxhythe	1922	Hutchinson (London)	
Simon the Coldheart	1925	William Heinemann (London)	
Beauvallet	1929	William Heinemann (London)	
The Conqueror	1931	William Heinemann (London)	
Royal Escape	1938	William Heinemann (London)	
My Lord John	1975	The Bodley Head (London)	

== Contemporary novels ==
The contemporary novels of Georgette Heyer
Title	Date of first publication	First edition publisher	Ref.
Instead of the Thorn	1923	Hutchinson (London)	
Helen	1928	Longmans and Co (London)	
Pastel	1929	Longmans and Co (London)	
Barren Corn	1930	Longmans and Co (London)	

== Detective novels ==
The detective novels of Georgette Heyer
Title	Date of first publication	First edition publisher	Ref.
Footsteps in the Dark	1932	Longmans and Co (London)	
Why Shoot a Butler?	1933	Longmans and Co (London). Serialised in British newspapers as Suspected! in 1933	
The Unfinished Clue	1934	Longmans and Co (London). Serialised in British newspapers as One Woman Who Knew in 1934	
Death in the Stocks	1935	Longmans and Co (London) also published as Merely Murder (U.S.)	
Behold, Here's Poison	1936	Hodder & Stoughton (London)	
They Found Him Dead	1937	Hodder & Stoughton (London)	
A Blunt Instrument	1938	Hodder & Stoughton (London)	
No Wind of Blame	1939	Hodder & Stoughton (London)	
Envious Casca	1941	Hodder & Stoughton (London) also published as A Christmas Party	
Penhallow	1942	William Heinemann (London)	
Duplicate Death	1951	William Heinemann (London)	
Detection Unlimited	1953	William Heinemann (London)	

== Essays ==
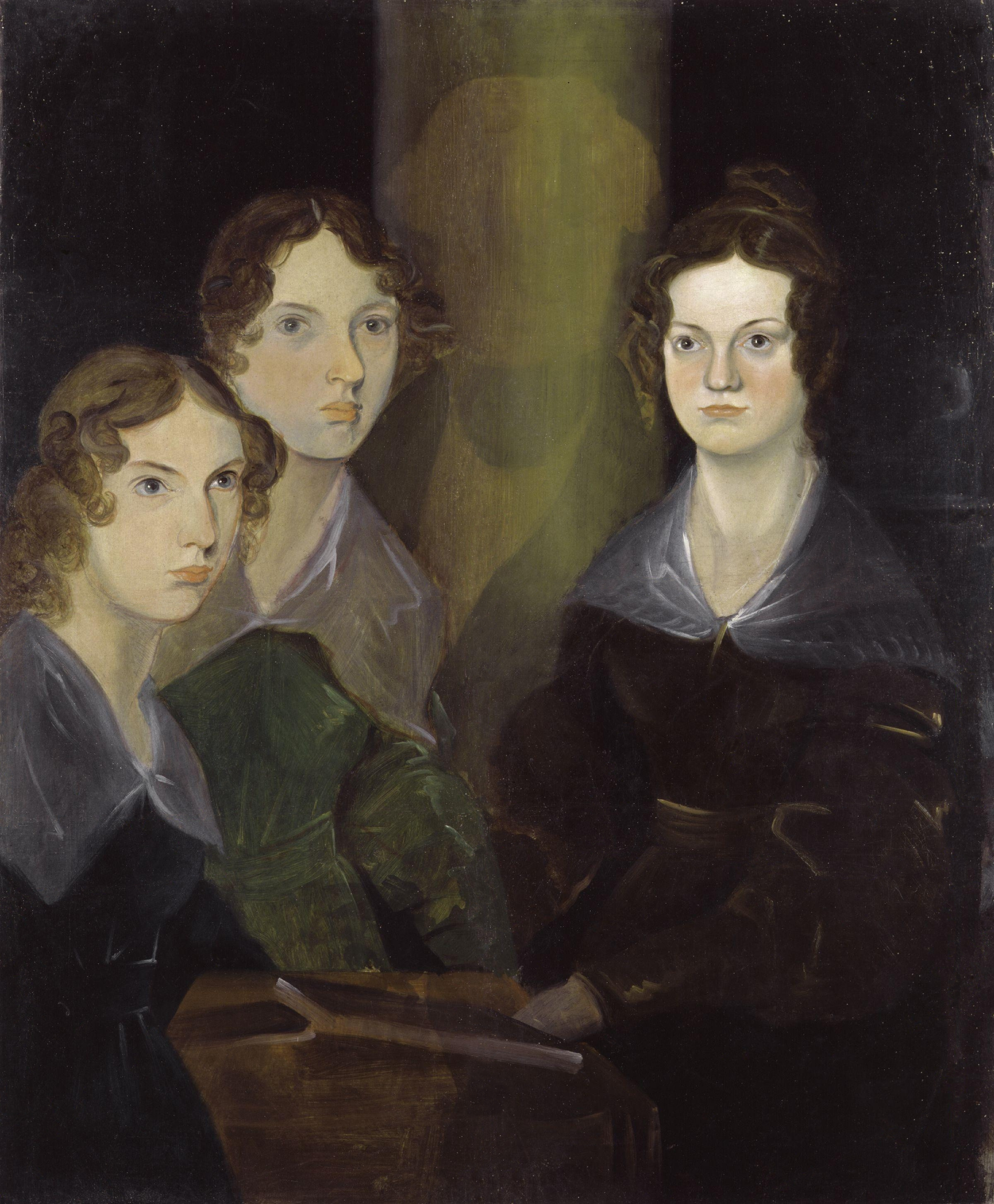
In 1954 Punch published an essay by Heyer about the Brontë sisters (pictured)

The essays of Georgette Heyer
Title	Date of first publication	First edition publisher	Ref.
"Books about the Brontës"	31 March 1954	Punch	
"How to be a Literary Critic"	28 April 1954	Punch	

== Short stories ==
The short stories of Georgette Heyer
Title	Date of first publication	First appearance	Ref.
"A Proposal to Cicely"	4 September 1922	The Happy Magazine	
"The Bulldog and the Beast"	March 1923	The Happy Magazine	
"Linckes' Great Case"	2 March 1923	The Detective Magazine	
"The Horned Beast of Africa"	22 June 1929	The Sphere	
"Runaway Match"	April 1936	Woman's Journal	
"Lady, Your Pardon"	3 April 1937	The Australian Women's Weekly	
"Incident on the Bath Road"	29 May 1937	The Australian Women's Weekly	
"Pursuit"	1939	The Queen's Book of the Red Cross	
Pistols for Two, which contains: "Pistols for Two"; "A Clandestine Affair"; "Bath Miss"; "Pink Domino"; "A Husband for Fanny"; "To Have the Honour"; "Night at the Inn"; "The Duel"; "Hazard"; "Snowdrift"; "Full Moon"	1960	William Heinemann (London) reissued in 2016, with three additional stories, as Snowdrift	
Acting on Impulse - Contemporary Short Stories by Georgette Heyer, which contains: "A Proposal to Cicely"; "The Little Lady"; "Lincke's Great Case"; "The Bulldog and the Beast"; "Acting on Impulse"; "Whose Fault Was It?"; "The Chinese Shawl"; "The Old Maid"; "Love"	2019	Overlord (Melbourne) with commentary from Jennifer Kloester and Rachel Hyland	
