= 1923 in literature =

This article contains information about the literary events and publications of 1923.

== Events ==
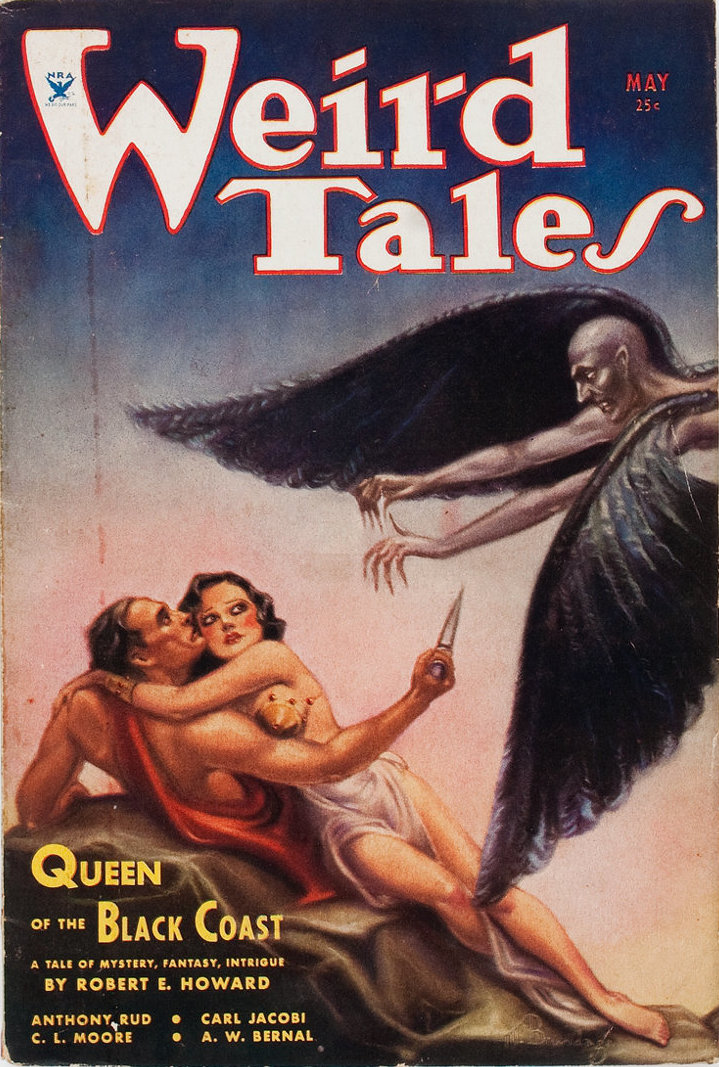
The May 1934 cover of Weird Tales, illustrating Queen of the Black Coast, one of Robert E. Howard's Conan the Barbarian stories

- January
  - A copy of James Joyce's 1922 novel Ulysses posted to a London bookseller by the proprietor of Davy Byrne's pub in Dublin, which features in the book, is detained as obscene by the British authorities.
  - T. E. Lawrence is forced to leave the British Royal Air Force, his alias as 352087 Aircraftman John Hume Ross having been exposed. He joins the Royal Tank Corps as 7875698 Private T. E. Shaw.
- February 5 – Poet and super-tramp W. H. Davies marries Helen Payne, an ex-prostitute thirty years his junior, at East Grinstead in England.
- February 18 (dated March) – The first issue of the pulp magazine Weird Tales appears in the U.S. It becomes noted for its horror fiction and fantasy.
- April 11 – Seán O'Casey's drama The Shadow of a Gunman, the first of his "Dublin Trilogy", set during the recent Irish War of Independence, opens at the Abbey Theatre, Dublin.
- April 21 – The first of a series of innovative modern–dress productions of Shakespeare plays, Cymbeline, directed by H. K. Ayliff, opens at Barry Jackson's Birmingham Repertory Theatre in England.
- May 9 – The première of Bertolt Brecht's play In the Jungle of Cities (Im Dickicht der Städte) at the Residenz Theatre in Munich is disrupted by Nazi demonstrators.
- May 11 – Dorothy L. Sayers' fictional English detective and bibliophile, Lord Peter Wimsey, makes his first appearance in the novel Whose Body?, published by Boni & Liveright in the United States. The first U.K. edition follows in October from T. Fisher Unwin.
- July 6 – A riot breaks out at the re-staging of Tristan Tzara's Dadaist play The Gas Heart at the Théâtre Michel, Paris, between those aligned with André Breton and those aligned with Tzara. The conflict leads to a permanent split in the Dada movement and the founding of Surrealism as an alternative.
- Summer – The teenage English brothers Julian and Quentin Bell begin issuing a family newspaper, the Charleston Bulletin, at their Sussex home, Charleston Farmhouse, with occasional contributions by their maternal aunt Virginia Woolf.
- September – T. S. Eliot's poem The Waste Land (1922) is first published in the United Kingdom in book form, complete with notes, in a limited edition by the Hogarth Press of Richmond upon Thames. The firm is run by Eliot's Bloomsbury Group friends Leonard and Virginia Woolf, and the type handset by Virginia (completed in July).
- October 8 – A production of Shakespeare's Titus Andronicus at The Old Vic, directed by Robert Atkins, is the first in London since 1857. It is also the first to restore the full original text since the playwright's time.
- December – Persian poet Nima Yooshij publishes the poem Afsaneh, the manifesto of the She'r-e Nimaa'i school of modernist poetry.
- December 28 – George Bernard Shaw's drama Saint Joan is premièred at the Garrick Theatre (New York City) on Broadway by the Theatre Guild, with Winifred Lenihan in the title role.
- unknown dates
  - The poet Xu Zhimo founds the Crescent Moon Society at private dinner meetings in China.
  - The Swedish printers Almqvist & Wiksell of Uppsala move into publishing.

== New books ==
=== Fiction ===
- Sherwood Anderson – Many Marriages
- Gertrude Atherton – Black Oxen
- Arnold Bennett – Riceyman Steps
- Maxwell Bodenheim – Blackguard
- Elizabeth Bowen – Encounters (short stories)
- Thomas Alexander Boyd – Through the Wheat
- Max Brand – Seven Trails
- John Buchan – Midwinter
- Hall Caine – The Woman of Knockaloe
- Willa Cather – A Lost Lady
- Alphonse de Chateaubriant – La Brière (Passion and Peat)
- Agatha Christie – The Murder on the Links (Hercule Poirot novel)
- Jean Cocteau – Thomas l'imposteur (Thomas the Imposter)
- Colette – Green Wheat (Le Blé en herbe)
- Joseph Conrad – The Rover
- Marie Corelli – Love and the Philosopher
- Freeman Wills Crofts – The Groote Park Murder
- Susan Ertz – Madame Claire
- Hans Fallada – Anton und Gerda
- Jeffery Farnol – Sir John Dering
- Lion Feuchtwanger – Die häßliche Herzogin (The Ugly Duchess)
- J. S. Fletcher – The Charing Cross Mystery
- Zona Gale – Faint Perfume
- Garet Garrett – Cinder Buggy
- Philip Gibbs – The Middle of the Road
- Kahlil Gibran – The Prophet
- Jaroslav Hašek – The Good Soldier Švejk (Osudy dobrého vojáka Švejka za světové války)
- Ernest Hemingway – Three Stories and Ten Poems
- Hermann Hesse – Demian (first English-language edition)
- Georgette Heyer
  - The Great Roxhythe
  - Instead of the Thorn
  - The Transformation of Philip Jettan
- Winifred Holtby – Anderby Wold
- Aldous Huxley – Antic Hay
- Ernst Jünger – Sturm
- Margaret Kennedy – The Ladies of Lyndon
- Joseph Kessel – The Crew
- D. H. Lawrence
  - Kangaroo
  - The Fox, The Captain's Doll, The Ladybird: Three Novellas
- Maurice Leblanc – Les Huit Coups de l'horloge (The Eight Strokes of the Clock)
- David Lindsay – Sphinx
- Agnes Mure Mackenzie – Without Conditions
- Katherine Mansfield – The Doves' Nest and Other Stories (short stories, published posthumously)
- Stratis Myrivilis – Η ζωή εν τάφω (I zoí en tafo, Life in the Tomb; serialization)
- Zofia Nałkowska – Romans Teresy Hennert (The Romance of Teresa Hennert)
- Liam O'Flaherty – Thy Neighbour's Wife
- E. Phillips Oppenheim – The Inevitable Millionaires
- Frank L. Packard – The Four Stragglers
- Marcel Proust – The Prisoner (La Prisonnière, vol. 5 of In Search of Lost Time)
- Raymond Radiguet – Le Diable au corps (The Devil in the Flesh)
- William MacLeod Raine – Iron Heart
- Ernest Raymond – Damascus Gate
- Maurice Renard – New Bodies for Old (first English language edition of Le Docteur Lerne – Sous-Dieu (1908))
- Joseph Roth – Das Spinnennetz (The Spider's Web)
- Rafael Sabatini – Fortune's Fool
- Vita Sackville-West – Challenge
- Dorothy L. Sayers – Whose Body?
- James Stephens – Deirdre
- Gene Stratton-Porter – The White Flag
- Italo Svevo – La Coscienza di Zeno
- Alexei Tolstoy – Aelita (Аэлита)
- Jean Toomer – Cane
- Sigrid Undset – The Bridal Wreath (English translation of Kransen by Charles Archer)
- Clément Vautel – My Priest Among the Rich
- Jules Verne (died 1905) (first English-language editions)
  - The Castaways of the Flag
  - The Lighthouse at the End of the World (largely attributed to Michel Verne)
- E. C. Vivian – Fields of Sleep
- Edgar Wallace
  - Bones of the River
  - The Books of Bart
  - Captains of Souls
  - Chick (short stories)
  - The Clue of the New Pin
  - The Green Archer
  - The Missing Million
- H. G. Wells – Men Like Gods
- Edith Wharton – A Son at the Front
- Margaret Widdemer – Graven Image
- William Carlos Williams – The Great American Novel
- Margaret Wilson – The Able McLaughlins
- Josef Winckler – The Mad Bomberg
- P. G. Wodehouse
  - The Inimitable Jeeves
  - Leave It to Psmith
- Virginia Woolf – "Mrs Dalloway in Bond Street"
- Anzia Yezierska – Salome of the Tenements

=== Children and young people ===
- Victor Appleton – Tom Swift and his Flying Boat (26th in the original series)
- Cicely Mary Barker – Flower Fairies of the Spring (first in the Flower Fairies series of at least ten books)
- Vitaly Bianki – Whose Nose is Better? (Чей нос лучше?)
- Edgar Rice Burroughs – Tarzan and the Golden Lion
- Charles Boardman Hawes – The Dark Frigate
- Hugh Lofting – Doctor Dolittle's Post Office (third in the Doctor Dolittle series of 13 books)
- Lucy Maud Montgomery – Emily of New Moon (first in the Emily series of three books)
- Felix Salten – Bambi, A Life in the Woods (Bambi. Eine Lebensgeschichte aus dem Walde)
- Ruth Plumly Thompson – The Cowardly Lion of Oz (17th in the Oz series overall and the third written by her)
- Else Ury – Nesthäkchen and Her Chicks
- Hugh Walpole – Jeremy and Hamlet (second in the Jeremy series of three books)

=== Drama ===
- Dorothy Brandon – The Outsider
- Bertolt Brecht – In the Jungle of Cities
- Gerald du Maurier – The Dancers
- Ian Hay – Good Luck
- Garnet Holme (adapted from Helen Hunt Jackson) – The Ramona Pageant
- Georg Kaiser – Side by Side (Nebeneinander)
- Charles McEvoy – The Likes of Her
- Seán O'Casey – The Shadow of a Gunman
- Elmer Rice – The Adding Machine
- Arnold Ridley – The Ghost Train
- Jules Romains – Doctor Knock (Knock, ou le Triomphe de la médecine)
- George Bernard Shaw – Saint Joan
- Marie Stopes – Our Ostriches
- Ernst Toller – Hinkemann
- Sergei Tretyakov
  - Do You Hear, Moscow? (Слышишь, Москва?!)
  - Earth in Turmoil
- Sutton Vane – Outward Bound
- Stanisław Ignacy Witkiewicz
  - The Crazy Locomotive (Szalona lokomotywa)
  - Janulka, Daughter of Fizdejko (Janulka, córka Fizdejki)
  - The Madman and the Nun (Wariat i zakonnica)

=== Poetry ===
- Louise Bogan – Body of This Death: Poems
- E. E. Cummings – Tulips and Chimneys
- Robert Frost – New Hampshire (including "Stopping by Woods on a Snowy Evening")
- Pablo Neruda – Crepusculario
- Sukumar Ray – Abol Tabol
- Wallace Stevens – Harmonium
- David Vogel – Lifney Hasha'ar Ha'afel (Before the Dark Gate)
- William Carlos Williams
  - Go Go
  - Spring and All

=== Non-fiction ===
- Vladimir Arsenyev – Dersu Uzala
- E. K. Chambers – The Elizabethan Stage
- Winston Churchill – The World Crisis (volumes 1 & 2 specifically)
- Le Corbusier – Toward an Architecture (Vers une architecture)
- Sigmund Freud – The Ego and the Id (Das Ich und das Es)
- Maxim Gorky – My Universities (Мои университеты)
- Laura Thornburgh and Don Carlos Ellis - Motion Pictures in Education
- Rudyard Kipling – The Irish Guards in the Great War
- D. H. Lawrence – Studies in Classic American Literature
- Giacomo Matteotti - Un anno di dominazione fascista
- Arthur Moeller van den Bruck – Das Dritte Reich
- Mihai Ralea – L'Idée de la révolution dans les doctrines socialistes
- Max Weber – Wirtschaftsgeschichte

== Births ==
- January 2 – Rachel Waterhouse, English historian and author (died 2020)
- January 6 – Jacobo Timerman, Argentine writer (died 1999)
- January 9 – David Holbrook, English novelist, poet and academic (died 2011)
- January 10 – Ingeborg Drewitz, German novelist and dramatist (died 1986)
- January 16 – Anthony Hecht, American poet (died 2004)
- January 29 – Paddy Chayefsky, American screenwriter (died 1981)
- January 31 – Norman Mailer, American writer and journalist (died 2007)
- February 2 – James Dickey, American poet and author (died 1997)
- February 9 – Brendan Behan, Irish writer and playwright (died 1964)
- February 12 – Alan Dugan, American poet and author (died 2003)
- February 23 – Mary Francis Shura, American writer (died 1991)
- February 25 – Harry Leslie Smith, English writer and political commentator (died 2018)
- March 1 – Shantabai Kamble, Indian Marathi writer and activist (died 2023)
- March 2 – Harriet Frank Jr., American film writer and producer (died 2020)
- March 24 – Michael Legat, English writer and editor (died 2011)
- March 26 – Elizabeth Jane Howard, English novelist (died 2014)
- March 27
  - Shusaku Endo (遠藤 周作), Japanese novelist (died 1996)
  - Louis Simpson, Jamaican-born American poet (died 2012)
- March 30 – Milton Acorn, Canadian poet, writer, and playwright (died 1986)
- April 3
  - Daniel Hoffman, American poet (died 2013)
  - John Ormond, Welsh poet (died 1990)
- April 19 – Stuart H. Walker, American Olympic yachtsman and writer (died 2018)
- April 20 – Bill Spence, English novelist (died 2024)
- April 21 – John Mortimer, English dramatist, screenwriter and barrister (died 2009)
- April 22 – Paula Fox, American writer (died 2017)
- April 23 – Manuel Mejía Vallejo, Colombian novelist (died 1998)
- May 1
  - Joseph Heller, American novelist (died 1999)
  - Ralph Senensky, American television director and writer (died 2025)
- May 21 – Dorothy Hewett, Australian poet, playwright and novelist (died 2002)
- May 22 – Aline Griffith, Dowager Countess of Romanones, Spanish-American cipher clerk, aristocrat, socialite and writer (died 2017)
- May 24 – Knut Ahnlund, Swedish literary historian and writer (died 2012)
- May 29 - Stanley Green, American theatre and film historian and writer (died 1990)
- June 7 – Martyn Goff, English author and bookseller (died 2015)
- June 14 – Judith Kerr, German-born English children's writer (died 2019)
- June 23 – John E. Sarno, American medical writer (died 2017)
- June 24 – Yves Bonnefoy, French poet and essayist (died 2016)
- July 2 – Wisława Szymborska, Polish poet and essayist (died 2012)
- July 5
  - Naomi Long Madgett, American poet (died 2020)
  - Mitsuye Yamada, Japanese-American activist, feminist, essayist, poet, story writer, editor, and teacher
- July 12 – James E. Gunn, American science fiction writer (died 2020)
- July 17 – James Purdy, American writer (died 2009)
- August 21 – Emma Smith (Elspeth Hallsmith), English novelist and autobiographer (died 2018)
- September 13 – Miroslav Holub, Czech poet (died 1998)
- September 22 – Dannie Abse, Welsh poet and writer (died 2014)
- October 5 – Stig Dagerman, Swedish author and journalist (died 1954)
- October 15 – Italo Calvino, Italian writer (died 1985)
- October 21 – Mihai Gafița, Romanian editor, literary historian and children's novelist (died 1977)
- October 24 – Denise Levertov, English-born American poet (died 1997)
- November 20 – Nadine Gordimer, South African writer (died 2014)
- November 23 – Gloria Whelan, American poet, short story writer, and novelist
- December 14 – Gerard Reve, Dutch novelist and poet (died 2006)
- December 21 – Richard Hugo, American poet and educator (died 1982)
- unknown date – Qu Bo (曲波), Chinese novelist (died 2002)

== Deaths ==
- January 3 – Jaroslav Hašek, Czech novelist (born 1883)
- January 9 – Katherine Mansfield, New Zealand-born fiction writer (born 1888)
- February 1 – Ernst Troeltsch, German theologian (born 1865)
- February 8 – Bernard Bosanquet, English philosopher and political theorist (born 1848)
- February 15 – Minnie Willis Baines, American eauthor (born 1845)
- February 25 – Emeline S. Burlingame, American editor and reformer (born 1836)
- March 6 – William Boyle, Irish dramatist and short story writer (born 1853)
- March 26 – Sarah Bernhardt, French actress (born 1844)
- March 29 – J. Smeaton Chase, English-born American author and photographer (born 1864)
- April 30 – Emerson Hough, American fiction author (born 1857)
- May 10 – Ulderiko Donadini, Croatian novelist, dramatist and short story writer (suicide, born 1894)
- May 23 – Henry Bradley, English philologist and lexicographer (born 1845)
- June 3 – Estelle Mendell Amory, American educator and author (born 1846)
- June 4 – Hume Nisbet, Scottish thriller writer, poet and painter (born 1849)
- June 10
  - Louis Couperus, Dutch novelist and poet (born 1863)
  - Pierre Loti, French novelist and travel writer (born 1850)
- June 22 – Morris Rosenfeld, Yiddish poet (born 1862)
- June 24 – Edith Södergran, Finnish Swedish poet (born 1892)
- July 9 – Florence Caddy, English non-fiction writer (born 1837)
- July 16
  - Louis Couperus, Dutch writer of fiction, non-fiction and poetry (born 1863)
  - Charles Boardman Hawes, American writer of fiction and non-fiction (born 1889)
- August 19 – Vilfredo Pareto, Italian economist, political scientist and philosopher (born 1848)
- August 24 – Kate Douglas Wiggin, American children's author (born 1856)
- October 6

- Oscar Browning, English historian (born 1837)
- Kate E. Griswold, American magazine editor, publisher, and proprietor (born 1860)

- October 8 – Florence Montgomery, English novelist and children's writer (born 1843)
- October 12 – John Cadvan Davies, Welsh poet and Wesleyan Methodist minister (born 1846)
- October 14 – Marcellus Emants, Dutch novelist (born 1848)
- November 18 – George Wharton James, English-born American journalist (born 1858)
- November 23 – Urmuz, Romanian short prose writer (suicide, born 1883)
- December 1 – Virginie Loveling, Flemish poet and novelist (born 1836)
- December 4 – Maurice Barrès, French novelist and journalist (born 1862)
- December 12 – Raymond Radiguet, French novelist and poet (born 1903)

== Awards ==
- James Tait Black Memorial Prize for fiction: Arnold Bennett, Riceyman Steps
- James Tait Black Memorial Prize for biography: Sir Ronald Ross, Memoirs, Etc.
- Newbery Medal for children's literature: Hugh Lofting, The Voyages of Doctor Dolittle
- Nobel Prize in Literature: William Butler Yeats
- Prix Goncourt: Lucien Fabre, Rabevel ou Le mal des ardents
- Pulitzer Prize for Drama: Owen Davis, Icebound
- Pulitzer Prize for Poetry: Edna St. Vincent Millay, The Ballad of the Harp-Weaver: A Few Figs from Thistles: Eight Sonnets in American Poetry, 1922. A Miscellany
- Pulitzer Prize for the Novel: Willa Cather, One of Ours

== Notes ==
- Hahn, Daniel (2015). The Oxford Companion to Children's Literature (2nd ed.). Oxford. University Press. ISBN 9780198715542.

== Sources ==
- Jaffery, Sheldon; Cook, Fred (1985). The Collectors' Index to Weird Tales. Bowling Green, Ohio: Bowling Green State University Popular Press. ISBN 0-87972-284-3.
