= The Talisman Ring =

1936 novel by Georgette Heyer

- First edition (UK)
- Author: Georgette Heyer
- Language: English
- Genre: Georgian, Romance
- Publisher: William Heinemann (UK); Book League (US)
- Publication date: 1936
- Publication place: United Kingdom
- Media type: Print (hardback & paperback)
- Pages: 272 pp

The Talisman Ring is a historical romance novel by Georgette Heyer, first published in 1936. Set in 1793, in the Georgian era, the action takes place in Sussex, where Heyer then lived.

Like several of Heyer's early novels including Regency Buck (1935) and The Corinthian (1940), The Talisman Ring blends the genres of romantic comedy and thriller. Jane Aiken Hodge describes it as a "neat comedy" and "very nearly a detective story in period costume". In counterpointing an older and a younger couple, the novel is a forerunner of many of Heyer's later works, such as Frederica (1965). The Talisman Ring is also the first of Heyer's novels to feature characters from the Bow Street Runners.

== Plot summary ==
On his deathbed, Lord Lavenham arranges a marriage between his great-nephew, Sir Tristram Shield, and his young French granddaughter, Eustacie de Vauban, who has escaped the revolutionary Reign of Terror by coming to England. His grandson and heir, Ludovic, is on the run on the Continent after allegedly murdering a card sharp in a dispute over a valuable heirloom, the talisman ring. The romantic Eustacie, appalled by her betrothed's phlegmatic character, runs away and soon encounters a smuggler, who turns out to be her cousin Ludovic. The two take refuge at a local inn, the Red Lion, after Ludovic is shot in the shoulder while escaping from Excisemen. There they encounter an older lady, Miss Sarah Thane, who is also adventurously inclined and vows to help them. She is travelling with her brother Sir Hugh, whom she persuades to stay by encouraging his belief that he has caught cold, for which the excellent French brandy hidden in its cellars is an effective cure.

After finding Eustacie's bandboxes scattered by the encounter and meeting the excisemen who are following Ludovic's blood trail, Tristram decides to go with them under the impression that Eustacie has encountered trouble from the smugglers. At the inn, against Sarah Thane's efforts, he conducts the excisemen towards Eustacie and Ludovic. Recognising Ludovic, Tristram leads the pursuers to believe that his cousin is a groom who had been shot while pursuing the smugglers and that he is one of Lord Lavenham's bastards to account for their resemblance. When the Excisemen leave, Tristram examines Ludovic's hands and pronounces his innocence, since he is not wearing the ring that would have been so important to him. Together with Sarah, now a loyal accomplice and Eustacie's self-appointed chaperone, they conclude that the murderer must be the foppish "Beau" Basil, Lord Lavenham's heir in the absence of Ludovic, and they hatch a plan to break into his home at the Dower House in search of the ring.

Over the course of the next days, Tristram spreads the story that Eustacie had gone to meet Sarah, whom she knew from Paris, to smooth over the ripples of her escape. It is concluded that Eustacie will stay with Sarah to help protect Ludovic, and thus Basil pays her a visit at the inn. During their discussion, Eustacie pretends that Sarah is interested in architecture and would like to visit the Dower House, to which Basil invites them both. They leave the house without finding the hiding place of the ring, but Basil's valet, having seen them rapping on the panels, informs Basil, who understands at once what they are after. Recollecting that Gregg, his factotum, has spoken to the Excisemen, he asks about the appearance of the "bastard" and, realising who it really is, calls in the Bow Street Runners.

The landlord of the Red Lion, a long-term supporter of Ludovic and his smugglers, gets rid of the inefficient runners by passing off Ludovic, dressed in Sarah's clothes, as a woman. Basil then lays a trap, announcing that he is going to London. Ludovic tries, against all advice, to break into the house and escapes later with the help of Tristram. Basil next tries to break into the inn and kill Ludovic but is stopped by Sir Hugh, and in the struggle he loses a quizzing glass. The next morning Sir Tristram discovers the missing glasses and, noticing their disproportion, eventually finds the ring concealed in the shaft. Tristram then calls in more intelligent Bow Street Runners and lays a trap for Basil who, while trying to escape, punches Miss Thane on the temple. She recovers with Tristram nursing her and is rather annoyed when he proposes to her in dishevelled state, though she confesses later on, "I have been meaning to marry you these ten days and more!".

== Characters ==
Sylvester, Lord Lavenham of Lavenham Court in Sussex, 80-year-old grandfather to Ludovic Lavenham and Eustacie de Vauban, great-uncle to Sir Tristram Shield and Basil Lavenham.

Ludovic Lavenham – Grandson to Lord Lavenham, accused of murder and living in exile, from where he smuggles in drink to the confederate land-smugglers Abel and Ned Bundy.

Sir Tristram Shield – a Berkshire resident and the 31-year-old great-nephew of Lord Lavenham, cousin to Basil and Ludovic Lavenham and Eustacie de Vauban.

Mademoiselle Eustacie de Vauban – 18-year-old niece of the exiled Vidame de Vauban and, as granddaughter to Lord Lavenham, cousin to Sir Tristram Shield and Basil and Ludovic Lavenham.

Basil, known as "Beau Lavenham", who lives in the Dower house at Lavenham – 29-year-old great nephew and heir-presumptive to Lord Lavenham, cousin to Eustacie de Vauban, Ludovic Lavenham and Sir Tristram Shield.

Sir Hugh Thane – a London Justice of the peace who generally travels accompanied by his younger sister Sarah.

Miss Sarah Thane – 28-year-old sister to Sir Hugh .

Jupp, valet to Lord Lavenham, and Porson, his butler.

Gregg – Basil's co-operative valet.

Joseph Nye – landlord of the Red Lion Inn at Hand Cross, which he runs with his tapster Clem.

Sir Matthew John Plunckett – a card cheat murdered in a dispute over the talisman ring.

== Sources ==
- Hodge, J. A. The Private World of Georgette Heyer. Bodley Head, 1984; reprinted Arrow Books, 2004.
- Heyerlist.com
