= Cousin Kate =

Cousin Kate may refer to:

- Cousin Kate, a 1968 novel by Georgette Heyer
- Cousin Kate, a 1910 play by Hubert Henry Davies
  - Cousin Kate, a lost 1921 American drama film, based on Davies's play
