= The Corinthian =

The Corinthian can refer to:

- Corinthian (comics), a character in The Sandman comic books
- The Corinthian (Manhattan), an apartment building in New York City
- The Corinthian (novel), a 1940 book by Georgette Heyer
