= Agnes Mackenzie =

Agnes Mackenzie or MacKenzie may refer to:

- Aggie MacKenzie (b. 1958), Scottish television presenter
- Agnes Mure Mackenzie (1891–1955), Scottish historian
