= Faro's Daughters =

Faro's Daughters may refer to:

- Faro Ladies, a pejorative term for aristocratic female gamblers in the late eighteenth century
- Faro's Daughter, a 1941 historical romance novel by Georgette Heyer

== See also ==
- Faro (disambiguation)
