= Simon the Coldheart =

1925 historical novel by Georgette Heyer

- First edition (1929 reprint)
- Author: Georgette Heyer
- Language: English
- Series: Yes
- Genre: Mediaeval, romance
- Publisher: Heinemann
- Publication date: 1925
- Publication place: United Kingdom
- Media type: Print
- Pages: 368 pp
- ISBN: 978-1-4022-1354-0
- OCLC: 225852514
- Dewey Decimal: 823/.912 22
- LC Class: PR6015.E795 S56 2008
- Followed by: Beauvallet

Simon the Coldheart is a historical fiction novel by Georgette Heyer published in 1925. Not a typical Georgette Heyer regency story, it is a tale of chivalry, intrigue and conquest. Set in the medieval period during the Hundred Years' War between England and France, it is her fifth novel, and the first of only three set in that period.

== Background ==
By 1940, Heyer became disillusioned with her early work and asked that six of her books including Simon the Coldheart no longer be published. In 1975, a year after her death, Georgette Heyer's son, Sir Richard Rougier, was asked to reconsider his mother's wishes regarding Simon the Coldheart. and allowed further reprints.

== Plot summary ==
In the year 1400 14-year-old Simon the illegitimate son of Geoffrey of Malvallet fends for himself after his mother's death. He forces himself into the service of Fulk of Montlice – his natural father's most hated foe. Simon works his way up from Fulk's Page until he is on equal footing with Montlice's son & heir, his friend Alan. He meets Geoffrey of Malvallet, the legitimate son of Simon's father. Alan, Geoffrey and Simon become great friends both to each other and to the Prince of Wales (later Henry V). When Simon is sent to Belremy, it seems he is faced with an impossible task. First besieging the city, then by attacking the actual city, Simon is able to take the town, but not the castle, where the regal Lady Margaret resides.

On finding out that Alan has been taken prisoner, Simon goes up to the castle himself, and after threatening the lady's life, her cousin Victor is forced to make a submission. On hearing this, Margaret declares that she will never submit to the English and tries to fling herself on Simon's dagger. Simon is too quick for her though and takes her prisoner. Later Margaret obtains a dagger, but finds herself unable to kill Simon.

When Simon is forced to go away for a few days, Margaret takes the opportunity to flee to a friend, only to find that he, too, has submitted to the English. Margaret is then kidnapped by Raoul the Terrible. Simon goes to search for her and finds Margaret in the arms of Raoul, struggling wildly. Simon's temper gets the best of him for the first time in his life, and he kills Raoul. Geoffrey, Simon, Margaret and her companion are forced to flee. The men bring them back to Belremy, and out of gratitude, Margaret hands in her submission. Simon tells her that he wants to marry her and she is indignant. However, later, when someone is lurking in the bushes, she runs to warn him as she is afraid that he will be killed. Simon is recalled to the Prince, but Margaret shows him that she wants him to come back. Eventually Simon comes back and Lady Margaret finally agrees to marry him.

Beauvallet (1929) follows the adventures of Simon's Great Great Great Grandson Sir Nicholas Beauvallet.

My Lord John (1975) covers much the same period (1393–1413). King's Henry IV and Henry V (Simon's friend) also appear in it.
