= Through the Wheat =

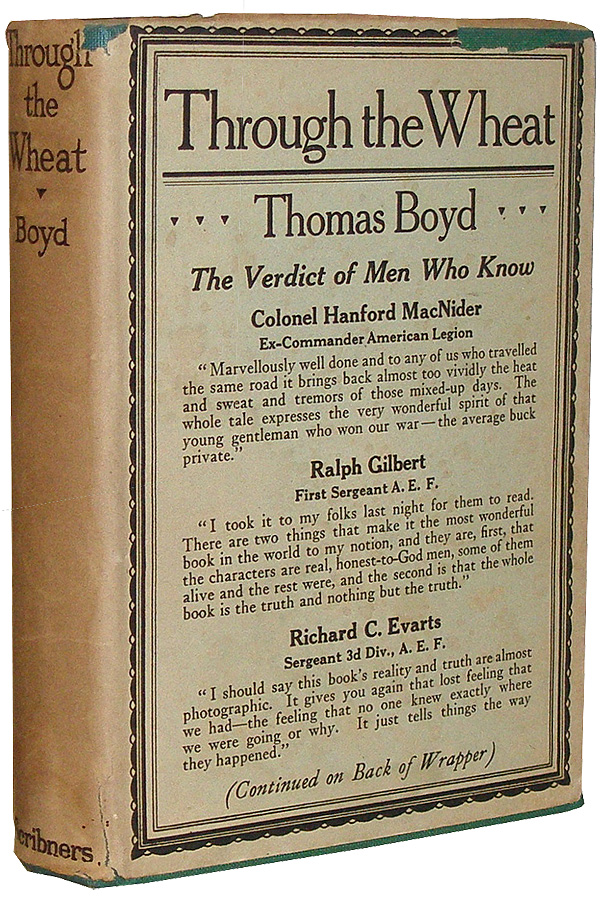
- Author: Thomas Alexander Boyd
- Language: English
- Genre: War novel
- Publisher: Scribner's Sons
- Publication date: April 27, 1923
- Publication place: United States
- Media type: Print (Paperback)
- Pages: 266 pp
- ISBN: 0-8032-6168-3
- OCLC: 43903471
- LC Class: PZ3.B6938 Th3 PS3503.O9
- Followed by: Points of Honor

Through the Wheat, published in 1923, was the first book published by Thomas Alexander Boyd, about the experiences of a young American Marine during World War I.

== Book synopsis ==
Through the Wheat follows the experience of William Hicks, an automatic rifleman in the U.S. Marine Corps, through his first experience of combat, at Belleau Wood. He enlists in the summer of 1917, but spends a year in France, where he serves as a military policeman, stevedore, and construction laborer. He doesn't see front-line action or combat until the summer of 1918, when the novel begins. First, Hick's company is sent to the front-line trenches, where they spend more than a month without fighting, and only once does Hicks, with a squad of men, leave the trenches to go on a small raid. However, during the raid, a communication mix-up causes their own lines to open fire on them, killing one of the squad and ending the raid. A few weeks later, the battalion is relieved from front-line duty.

Not long after, the Germans begin their Spring Offensive, and Hick's company is sent to northern France to help repel the invasion. They engage the Germans, and fight the Battle of Belleau Wood, as one by one members of Hick's original platoon get picked off by gunfire, bombardment, gas, and even self-inflicted injury. By the end of the novel, everyone that Hicks knew a few months before is dead, and Hick himself has been so pushed by starvation, dehydration, and exhaustion that he is skirting the edge of delirium. The novel ends with Hicks losing all care in the world and going emotionally numb.

== Reception ==
Contemporary reviews of Through the Wheat compared it to The Red Badge of Courage. F. Scott Fitzgerald said that the novel was a "work of art" and published a review in the New York Evening Post praising the novel.
