= My Lord John =

1975 historical novel by Georgette Heyer

- First edition (UK)
- Author: Georgette Heyer
- Language: English
- Genre: Historical novel
- Published: Jul 1975 The Bodley Head (UK); Oct 1975 E. P. Dutton (US)
- Publication place: United Kingdom
- ISBN: 0-525-16242-9
- OCLC: 1725211
- Dewey Decimal: 823/.9/12
- LC Class: PZ3.H514 My3 PR6015.E795

My Lord John is an unfinished historical fiction novel by the British author Georgette Heyer, published posthumously in 1975 after her death the previous year. It traces the early lives of the "young lordings" – Harry, Thomas, John, and Humfrey – all sons of the future Lancastrian king Henry IV of England. They grow up amidst turbulent events including the 1394 pestilence, the exile of their father by Richard II, the death of their powerful grandfather John of Gaunt, and the seizure of the throne by their father. John of Lancaster serves as the novel's main character.

Heyer intended the novel to be the first instalment in a trilogy covering the House of Lancaster at the peak of its power (1393–1435), with John as its central character. She felt that John, now largely unknown today, was ideal because he was a "great man" who lived during the entirety of her selected time period and was the most trusted brother of Henry V. However, Heyer failed to complete the trilogy, finding herself distracted with the writing of her popular Regency novels to please her fans and offset her tax liabilities. She died in 1974, and My Lord John was published by her family a year later. It covered only the early life of John of Lancaster, from 1393 to 1413.

Upon its publication, My Lord John garnered a mostly negative reception from contemporary readers and literary critics, who felt that it lacked narrative flow and was inferior to Heyer's Regency novels. Modern critics also have viewed the work unfavourably. Featuring significant historical detail, it has been labelled "more serious" than her previous undertakings; one reviewer felt it resembled a historical narrative more than a novel. A German translation was released in 1980.

== Background and development ==
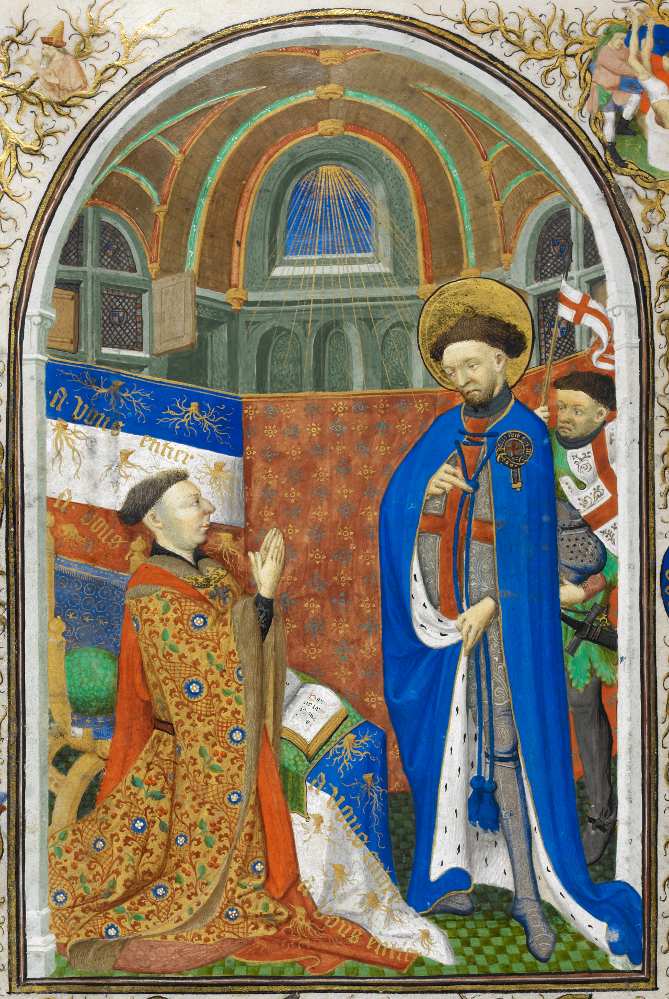
Heyer chose to focus her House of Lancaster trilogy on John of Lancaster (pictured), in part because his lifespan covered the entirety of the time period she wished to depict.

Georgette Heyer is best known for writing romantic stories set in the Regency era, but her body of work encompassed many different historical periods, including the English Civil War and the Middle Ages. One of her favoured periods centred on the House of Lancaster's peak of power, between 1393 and 1435. In 1950, Heyer began working on what she called "the magnum opus of my latter years", a medieval trilogy intended to cover the House of Lancaster during that period. She estimated that she would need five years to complete this project. Her impatient readers continually clamoured for new books, however; to satisfy them and her tax liabilities, Heyer interrupted herself to write Regency romances, such as April Lady (1957) and Charity Girl (1970).

According to Heyer's husband George Ronald Rougier, the Lancaster trilogy was to centre on John of Lancaster because he was Henry V's most trusted brother, lived during the entirety of her selected time period, and "was a great man" little known today. In her novel, Heyer describes John as possessing the "best temper of all his family, and the greatest talent for peacemaking." Rougier stated that the perfectionist Heyer prepared for the trilogy by embarking on holistic research that covered "every aspect of the period," including its wars, social conditions, and heraldry. Heyer learned to read medieval English and created indexed files that catalogued every single day for the forty year time period. She and her husband travelled England and Scotland, where Heyer took copious notes while visiting seventy-five castles and twenty-three abbeys.

After each break taken to write another Regency novel however, Heyer found it difficult to return to writing the trilogy and "recapture the spirit of her main work," as each time she had to refresh her knowledge of the era. As a result, she only managed to complete nearly a third of the trilogy, and My Lord John was the result of these efforts. It became her only completed volume of the series. Heyer died in 1974, with a story that only covered a quarter of John of Lancaster's life, from 1393 to 1413. The novel's structure is split into four parts, each covering a specific period of John's life.

== Plot ==
=== Historical background ===
The reign of Richard II of England forms the backdrop of the novel. Having become monarch at a young age, Richard has become a vain king "not universally held in high esteem." In his minority, governance has been dominated by select favourites such as the 9th Earl of Oxford, who is deeply unpopular. In response to policies they deem bad for the realm, Henry of Bolingbroke, Earl of Derby and other members of the "Lords Appellant", such as the Duke of Norfolk and the Earl of Arundel, successfully take up arms against Oxford at the Battle of Radcot Bridge and remove him from power.

Now twenty-two, King Richard takes the reigns of government back into his own hands, appointing new favourites labelled "contemptible foppets" by his uncle John of Gaunt, 1st Duke of Lancaster. Gaunt is, however, loyal and trusted by the King despite his disagreements with court favourites. As one of the most powerful men in the kingdom, Gaunt has been involved in an ongoing conflict with Arundel, an "orgulous" man whom Gaunt blames for inciting a rising in Cheshire.

=== Plot summary ===
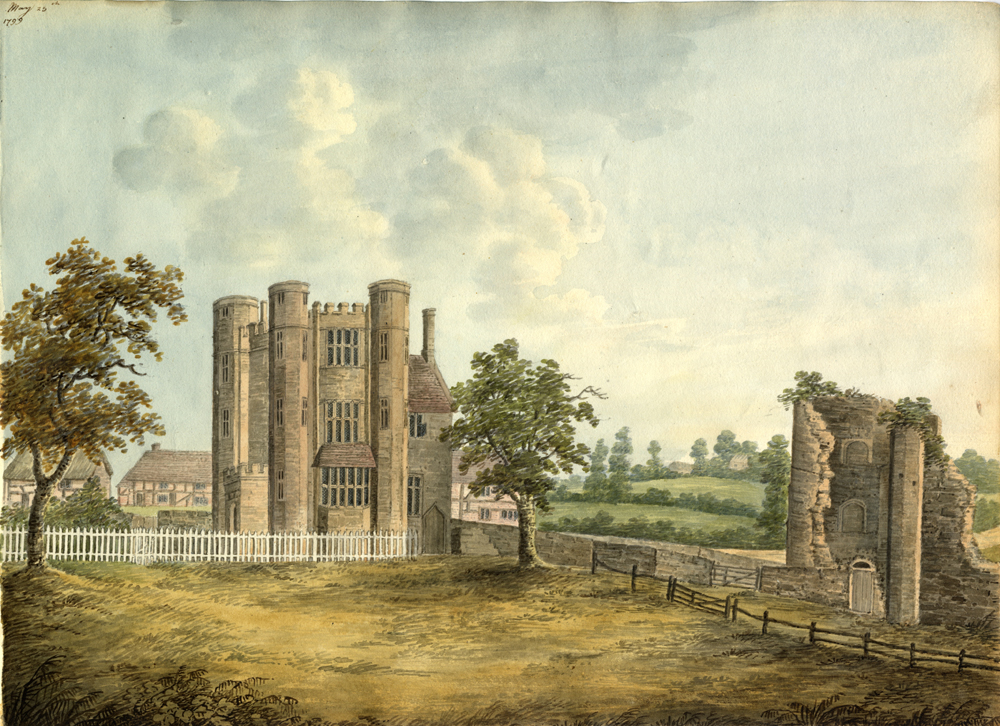
Kenilworth Castle (pictured in 1799), where much of the early story takes place

The novel's story begins in 1393 England. John of Lancaster – the third eldest son of Henry of Bolingbroke – resides at Kenilworth Castle with his mother Countess Mary and three brothers Harry, Thomas, and Humfrey. The boys are visited by their grandfather, John of Gaunt, and a large retinue that includes his mistress Katherine Swynford, his daughter Lady Elizabeth, and his three Beaufort sons. Mary privately worries to Katherine that the King will never forgive her husband's participation at Radcot Bridge and the loss of his "dear friend" Oxford.

Mary and the children travel to London to greet the recently travelling Bolingbroke – "a handsome, jolly knight, richly caparisoned, splendidly horsed" – who is very popular with the city's residents, unlike his father. The Earl of Derby pays homage to King Richard, who decides that Harry will become his squire. Gaunt succeeds in getting Arundel ousted from court. Mary dies of the plague, as does Queen Anne and Gaunt's wife Constance.

Harry becomes King Richard's squire while John is sent to live with the Countess Marshal at Framlingham Castle. There, he is lonely though kindly treated. John hears of the increasingly erratic behaviour of the king, who has had the body of Oxford embalmed and publicly displayed. Former members of the Lords Appellant are arrested, including Arundel, Gloucester, and Warwick. Richard also decides that those "who were of his own blood" will be raised to the status of dukes, and Henry of Bolingbroke is made Duke of Hereford.

Fearful of Hereford's power, Richard unjustly orders that his cousin be banished from the realm for six years, to the dismay of the House of Commons and many others. Slowly dying of old age, Gaunt's final advice to Richard, that he put aside his favourites and become a just king, falls on deaf ears. Gaunt dies soon after; Richard becomes increasingly dictatorial and prevents Gaunt's vast inheritance from being granted to Bolingbroke; his banishment is converted to life, though his sons remain in the country. In the wake of these troublesome events, Richard leaves England for Ireland, a decision widely considered folly considering the turmoil England is in. Bolingbroke returns to England and many nobleman flock to his banner; Richard is overthrown.

John watches as his father is crowned Henry IV of England and Harry is made Prince of Wales, but remains sceptical that his family has a more immediate claim to the crown than others in their family. The new king's supporters insist Henry kill Richard and others who oppose him, but Henry resists the calls for violence. Henry deals with opposition to his rule in the form of rebellions, imposters, and men who expected him to right every wrong in the kingdom. Amidst these events, John grows up under the fostership of various households. John is a talented student, but is more interested in the problems of the realm than mere writings of long dead men. He is the only one of Henry IV's sons interested in crown finances, and acquires as much information on the running of government as possible.

It was not until July that Harry reached Northumberland, and by that time John was engaged on the first of the tasks at which, all his life, he was to excel: the pacification and the government of a troubled land. Perceiving in his third son this talent for administration, King Henry had bestowed wide powers on him, leaving it to him to seize recalcitrant peers, punish transgressors, pardon penitents, appoint new offers, and negotiate truces.

— Georgette Heyer on young John's skills as an administrator

As a teenager John proves his worth and is gradually granted positions of authority, first as Master of the Falcons, then as Lord Warden of the East Marches and Constable of England. He takes all three positions seriously, devoting himself to the acquirement of knowledge necessary for effective administration. He comes of age in the midst of these busy tasks, a ready pupil to the string of men sent to advise him. He helps his father withstand the Glyndŵr and Northern Risings, and wisely gives military command to his more experienced uncle Westmorland. He understands that his administrative skill is more useful than acting as a soldier, and earns the respect of the people under his control by not being unduly harsh with punishment and embarking on negotiations with the Scots.

The novel abruptly ends mid-sentence, with John journeying north to negotiate a long truce with the Scots on behalf of his brother Harry.

== Analysis ==
My Lord John, as one of Heyer's few historical novels, marks a departure from her more popular Regency stories. It has been labelled "more serious" than her previous undertakings, and features extensive historical detail. Geneva Stephenson of the Columbus Dispatch likened My Lord John more to a historical narrative than a novel, only deciding on the latter category due to the work's "in-depth characterisation, movement, colour, [and] motivation."

By featuring the life of John of Lancaster from early childhood to young adulthood, Heyer conveys a full glimpse of medieval life – court intrigues as well as the lives of ordinary people are part of the story. Furthermore, while near to major historical players, John's apartness from power allows Heyer to create a fuller depiction of his life without having to change major historical events.

== Release and reception ==
Heyer's family published My Lord John in 1975, a year after Heyer's death. Several days after its release, A. S. Byatt reported that The Bodley Head "have received their biggest paperback offer ever" for the novel. That publishing company released the novel in the United Kingdom, while its American release was handled by Dutton, a company based in New York. A German translation was released in 1980.

In the period immediately following its publication, the novel received fourteen professional reviews – a number much larger than most of her other works. Critics gave largely negative reviews, and Mary Fahnestock-Thomas writes that "many fans [found My Lord John] virtually unreadable." The year of its release in 1975, Library Journal contributor Eleanore Singer praised it for being "well-documented historical writing," though she felt that "as a novel, it doesn't have enough dramatic or narrative flow to keep it from being often boring." Singer added that My Lord John "falls far short of that superb blending of history and compelling storytelling that characterizes successful examples of the genre." Jane Aiken Hodge of History Today, while praising Heyer's Regency novels as "triumphs of a language that never was on sea or land," thought that My Lord John was "less successful." The language of the novel, Aiken Hodge said, was grating and "scattered with too lavish a hand," with words like lordings and bel sire. Aiken Hodge also felt that while it contained "some happy moments of unmistakable Heyer humour," it failed to contain enough to "hold a young reader for long."

R.M. Franklin of The Times Literary Supplement opined that because the novel ended before the "most interesting parts of John of Bedford's career," it "has an air of anticlimax about it, and more than once themes are indicated which vanish inexplicably." In a 2008 contribution for The Times, Hilary Rose praised Heyer's Regency novels but found My Lord John to be "oddly difficult, possibly on account of it being concerned more with medieval history than masquerade balls at Vauxhall Gardens." Writing for Tor.com in 2012, Mari Ness opined that while Heyer hoped My Lord John would be her masterpiece, it instead "serves mainly as an illustration that authors are often terrible at determining which of their works is actually a masterpiece. My Lord John, absolutely not."
