= A Year of Fascist Domination =

1923 Italian political essay

The Fascisti Exposed: A Year of Fascist Domination (in Italian: Un anno di dominazione fascista) It is a political essay by Giacomo Matteotti from 1923 in which the author, a socialist member of Parliament, denounces the violent nature of fascism. Published in early 1924, Matteotti was already working on a new edition updated with the latest information and figures but was assassinated shortly thereafter.

== Content ==
The essay is a scathing critique of fascism, condemning above all the justification of violence in the exercise of power, as well as the glaring contradictions between the policies announced and those actually implemented (for example, the encouragement of financial speculation, contrary to what had been declared) after a year in office. The text consists of three sections:

1. Economic and financial situation: a detailed analysis of the expenditures incurred by the Mussolini government;
2. Actions of the fascist government: an analysis of political decisions; an entire chapter is devoted to the abuse of decree-laws;
3. The words of the leaders and accounts of the events: the conquest of Molinella and freedom of the press: an anthology of statements made by Mussolini and party members, pro-government newspapers, and a long list of acts of intimidation that occurred between November 1922 and December 1923.

Italian fascist violence continued to manifest itself after the regime’s first year in power, with numerous instances of squadrismo against its political opponents. Shortly after making this accusation, the author, while working on an updated edition of the book and its publication abroad, was murdered.

== Editions ==
- Un anno di dominazione fascista. Tipografia italiana. 1923.
  - Un anno di dominazione fascista. A. Forni. 1980.
  - Un anno di dominazione fascista. West Indian. 2013. ISBN 978-88-907099-2-0.
  - Un anno di dominazione fascista. con un saggio di Umberto Gentiloni Silveri, introduzione di Walter Veltroni. Rizzoli. 2019. ISBN 978-88-171-3894-9.
  - Un anno di dominazione fascista. introduzione di Giorgio Benvenuto. EDUP. 2022. ISBN 978-88-8421-275-7.
- Stefano Caretti, ed. (2020). Un anno e mezzo di dominazione fascista. Pisa University Press. ISBN 978-88-333-9267-7.
- The fascisti exposed. A Year of Fascist Domination. Translated by E. W. Dickes. Independent Labour Party Publication Department. 1924.
  - The fascisti exposed. A Year of Fascist Domination. Translated by E. W. Dickes. Howard Fertig. 1969.
- Une année de domination fasciste (in French). Maison nationale d'edition. 1924.
- Hanns-Erich Kaminski (1925). Fascismus in Italien. Grundlagen - Aufstieg - Niedergang (in German). Verlag für Sozialwissenschaft.

== Bibliography ==
- Matteotti, Giacomo (2019). Un anno di dominazione fascista. con un saggio di Umberto Gentiloni Silveri, introduzione di Walter Veltroni. Rizzoli. ISBN 978-88-171-3894-9.
