= Thomas Alexander Boyd =

American journalist and novelist, 1898-1935

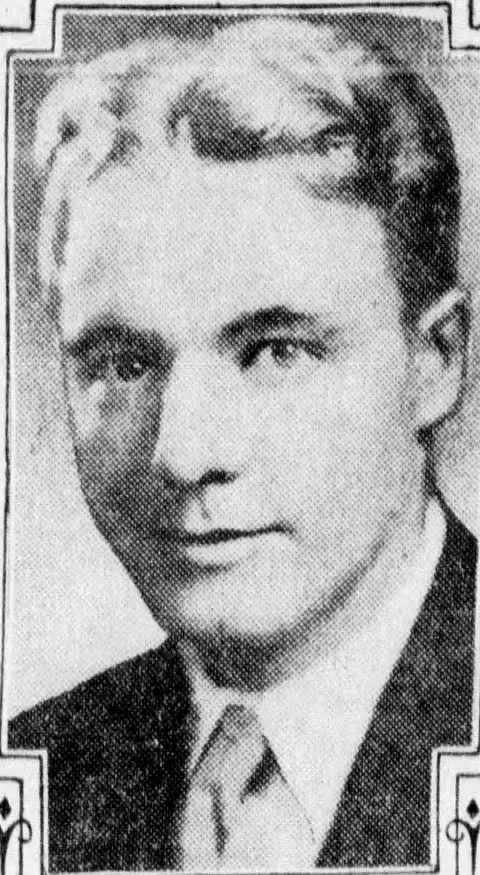
- Boyd in 1928
- Born: July 3, 1898; Defiance, Ohio
- Died: January 27, 1935 (aged 36)
- Occupations: Journalist, novelist
- Writing career
- Notable work: Through the Wheat

Thomas Alexander Boyd (July 3, 1898 – January 27, 1935) was an American journalist and novelist, born in Defiance, Ohio.

Boyd was raised by his mother's family due to his father's death before he was born. While still in school, he and a friend enlisted in the U.S. Marine Corps and saw service in France during World War I, where he was gassed in 1918.

Upon discharge from the occupation forces in 1919, Boyd tried several occupations before becoming a writer for newspapers in Minneapolis and St. Paul, Minnesota. He opened a bookstore, Kilmarnock Books, in St. Paul, which became the locus of literary figures, including Sinclair Lewis. He was urged to write and produced the 1923 novel Through the Wheat, based in part on his own war experiences and set partly during the Battle of Belleau Wood. Another war novel, The Dark Cloud, followed in 1924, and a book of short stories, Point of Honor, in 1925. Boyd later remarried and became interested in Socialist causes during the Depression, eventually running as the Communist candidate for governor of Vermont.

He died suddenly in 1935 of a stroke.

== Selected works ==
- Through the Wheat (1923) novel
- The Dark Cloud (1924) novel
- Points of Honor (1925) stories
- Samuel Drummond (1925) novel
- Shadow of the Long Knives (1928) novel
- Simon Girty, the White Savage (1928) biography
- Mad Anthony Wayne (1929) biography
- Light-Horse Harry Lee (1931) biography
- Poor John Fitch (1935) biography
- In Time of Peace (1935) novel
