= The Toll-Gate =

Book by Georgette Heyer

- First edition
- Author: Georgette Heyer
- Cover artist: Arthur Barbosa
- Language: English
- Genre: Regency, Romance, Detective novel
- Publisher: William Heinemann
- Publication date: 1954
- Publication place: United Kingdom
- Media type: Print (Hardback and Paperback)
- Pages: 288 pp

The Toll-Gate is a Regency romance novel by Georgette Heyer set in 1817. Unlike many Heyer plots which concentrate on a plucky heroine this one follows a hero, an ex-captain of Dragoon Guards returned from the Peninsular War and finding life as a civilian dull and confining.

The setting for this detective romance is in and around a Toll-Gate in the Peak District, in stark contrast to the elegant London, Bath, Brighton, or stately home backgrounds which characterized most Heyer Regency novels.

== Plot introduction ==
Captain John ("Crazy Jack") Staple is finding civilian life extremely tedious after a military career in the Peninsular War and a stint as an aide-de-camp at the Battle of Waterloo. Escaping a formal (and somewhat boring) dinner party among his exceptionally tall relations, Jack sets out by himself on horseback to visit a more congenial friend some 60 miles away. After becoming lost on the moors in the dark and rain, he reaches a toll-gate where a badly frightened 10-year-old boy is acting as toll collector for his absent father. Curiosity, compassion, weariness, and his and his horse's needs for shelter lead him to stay overnight, with a view to sorting out the situation in the morning.

But next morning he is struck dumb at sight of equally tall and statuesque Nell Stornaway, the local squire's granddaughter, and realizes he has finally received his "leveller". To pursue the acquaintance he remains in place by posing as the missing toll-keeper's 'cousin,' while establishing his bona fides with Nell and her grandfather.

Over the next few days Jack's circle of acquaintances rapidly expands to include a highwayman, a Bow Street Runner, the local gentry, their devoted retainers, and inhabitants of the nearest village and surrounding countryside - the while mastering the rigors of his new 'duties' and the local dialect. Other complications include finding a dead body, stolen treasure, and some masked villains. In the process of preventing a scandal Jack also manages to identify a murderer, deal with the villains, retrieve the treasure, satisfy the law, provide for his friends... and resolve his own romance.

== Characters in "The Toll-Gate" ==
=== Major characters ===
- John ('Crazy Jack') Staple, 29 year old ex-Captain of Dragoon Guards, "a young giant"
- Sir Peter Stornaway, local squire, bed-ridden following a stroke
- Nell Stornaway, Sir Peter's 26 year old granddaughter, "very tall" (over 5'9") and "nobly proportioned"
- Jerry Chirk, highwayman
- Gabriel Stogumber, Bow Street Runner

=== Minor characters ===
- Henry Stornaway, Sir Peter's grandson and heir, Nell's cousin
- Nathaniel Coate, Henry's friend
- Gunn, Coate's servant
- Wilfred Babbacombe, Jack's ex-Army friend
- Edward Brean, missing toll-gate keeper
- Ben Brean, Edward's 10 year old son, Chirk's friend
- Mr Willitoft, trustee of the Derbyshire Tolls

=== Sornaway retainers ===
- Rose Durward, former nurse and Nell's maid
- Huby, Sir Peter's butler
- Winkfield, Sir Peter's valet
- Joe Lydd, head groom
