= The Nonesuch =

1962 novel by Georgette Heyer

- First edition
- Author: Georgette Heyer
- Cover artist: Arthur Barbosa
- Language: English
- Genre: Regency, Romance
- Publisher: William Heinemann
- Publication date: 1962
- Publication place: United Kingdom
- Media type: Print (Hardback & Paperback)
- Pages: 304 pp

The Nonesuch is a Regency romance by Georgette Heyer, published by Heinemann in 1962 in the UK and by the US firm E. P. Dutton in 1963. The story is set in the 1816/1817 period. As a late novel by Heyer, it commanded large sales. The first printing of sixty thousand copies soon sold out and was followed immediately by a second.

== Plot summary ==
On his death, skinflint Joseph Calver has left Broom Hall, his ramshackle Yorkshire property, to Sir Waldo Hawkridge, a cousin he has never met in his life. Unmarried at 35, the already wealthy new heir is known in society as 'The Nonesuch' and has set up an orphanage for some fifty boys in the London area. Now he travels to the West Riding to inspect his inheritance with a view to adapting it for the same purpose. His young cousin, Julian, Lord Lindeth, asks to accompany him north by way of distraction from the fashionable world that bores him.

Broom Hall is situated near the village of Oversett, where much of the rest of the novel's events take place, with occasional trips to the convenient shops and coaching inns in the neighbouring town of Leeds. The new visitors are dined, breakfasted and bidden to any number of impromptu dance parties, especially by families with marriageable daughters in search of a wealthy partner. The Nonesuch also becomes the idol of the young men of the district, who give up their dandified ways to imitate his masculine elegance.

One household in particular becomes the focus of the new visitors: Staples. Mrs Underhill's daughter Charlotte is far outshone by her forward cousin Tiffany Wield, a spoiled and glamorous heiress whose main aim is to enslave every new male she encounters. The only person in the household able to rein in Tiffany's wilful behaviour is Ancilla Trent, a twenty-six year old from a formerly genteel background who must now support herself by acting as a governess and companion as part of the Underhill family.

Lord Lindeth soon becomes enthralled by Tiffany, who is on the outlook for an aristocratic marriage, while Sir Waldo, for some reason, seems to single out Ancilla for his attentions. Eventually Lindeth becomes disgusted by Tiffany's selfishness and jealous spite and this is brought to a head when visiting Leeds, where the rector's daughter Patience Chartley has joined their party. Suddenly Patience dashes into the road to rescue a young urchin, who is running away with a stolen apple, from being run over by a horse and carriage. Tiffany is enraged at all the sympathetic attention given Patience for her pluck and makes her displeasure at being overlooked only too obvious. The situation is only saved when Sir Waldo intervenes to drive Tiffany home in his own phaeton.

Lindeth now spends more of his time at the rector's home and Tiffany is even more shamed when the local young men make it clear that they have grown tired of her moodiness and begin to cold shoulder her. In order to make a better impression, Tiffany goes to visit Patience on the very day that Lindeth proposes to and is accepted by her. Rushing home in humiliation, she persuades Laurence Calver, another of Sir Waldo's cousins down on a visit, to drive her to Leeds; there she makes it clear that she expects him to help her catch the coach to London so that she can stay with an uncle there. Instead he tricks her into waiting in a room in an inn and meanwhile sends Waldo an urgent message to come and retrieve her.

Sir Waldo enlists Ancilla unwilling's company to Leeds but the two quarrel on the way. She has earlier misinterpreted Lindeth's reference to Waldo's "wretched brats" (meaning the orphans he provides for) to mean that they are his bastard children and is outraged when he presses her for an explanation why she will not accept his proposal and marry him. Once this misunderstanding is cleared up, all other problems are solved too. Waldo agrees to help Tiffany avoid embarrassment by sending her back to London; he promises Laurence Calder the business loan he has come to obtain; and to allow Ancilla to fulfil her pedagogical instincts by making her his married partner in the new orphanage.

== Context ==
The meaning of 'nonesuch' is explained early in the novel when Mrs Underhill is puzzled by the term and is informed by Tiffany that it means 'perfection', explained by Ancilla as 'a paragon' and impatiently by her son Courtenay as "the greatest Go among all the Goers" (p. 16). Later it is taken to mean that Sir Waldo excels in the field of sporting attainments and horsemanship; a few pages later, he is referred to as belonging to the athletic men of fashion known as 'Corinthians' (p. 23).

The problem is that appreciation of the novel depends too much on special knowledge of the period and its social conventions. The action in The Nonesuch is a departure from Heyer's usual courtship formula with its easily foreseen conclusion and both her biographers find the plot unsatisfactory. For Jane Aiken Hodge it "shows signs of strain"; when compared with earlier novels, "the silly young women are getting more tiresome and the silly young men less convincing." Jennifer Kloester describes it as "rather inane", while fellow Romance writer Mary Kingswood deprecates the contrivance of 'The Great Misunderstanding' that keeps Sir Waldo and Ancilla apart for so long as an "annoyance".

Again, while Heyer's use of contemporary slang is generally judged diverting, Hodge finds excessive and mystifying the introduction of instances of rare Yorkshire usage so early in the novel, and gives as an example Courtenay's response to Tiffany Wield's London-based pretensions in his retort "Yes, you were as thick as inkle-weavers with [Sir Waldo], of course. What miff-maff you do talk!" Again, the meticulous research into period detail is too obvious. The twelve-shilling silk stockings, for example, of which Tiffany buys several pairs in Leeds and Patience budgets for just one; or the latter's walking dress of figured muslin (with a double flounce and long sleeves), the elegance of which she was later to dishevel by kneeling on the cobbles in the course of her dramatic rescue of the small boy in Leeds. Such details are what substitute for the failure of human interest complained of by Hodge.

But such failures are compensated for in the eyes of commentators by the differences in the focus of this novel. The hero's social interests give him greater depth of character, manifested not just in his work with orphans but in his admiration for Ancilla as a person, quite apart from the military connections within her family which impress others. Again, the book's largely restricted setting is seen as evidence of Heyer's consciously heeding the dictum of Jane Austen that "3 or 4 families in a country village is the very thing to work on." In addition, its 19th century credentials are strengthened by a perceived debt to later "governess novels" such as Jane Eyre. Such details place it apart from the usual formulaic run of Heyer's romances.

== Bibliography ==
- Georgette Heyer, The Nonesuch (1962) at Internet Archive
- Jane Aiken Hodge, The Private World of Georgette Heyer (1984)
- Jennifer Kloester, Georgette Heyer’s Regency World (2005)
- Jennifer Kloester, Georgette Heyer (2013)
