= The Unknown Ajax =

1959 novel by Georgette Heyer

- First edition
- Author: Georgette Heyer
- Cover artist: Arthur Barbosa
- Language: English
- Genre: Regency, Romance
- Publisher: William Heinemann
- Publication date: 1959
- Publication place: United Kingdom
- Media type: Print (Hardback & Paperback)
- Pages: 352 pp

The Unknown Ajax is a Regency romance by Georgette Heyer, published in 1959 by Heinemann in the UK and in 1960 by Putnam in the US. It was her forty-seventh novel and the eighteenth set in Regency times.

== Plot ==
The novel is set in 1817. Owing to the death of his official heir in a boating accident, the domineering Lord Darracott has had to summon the next in line, his grandson Major Hugo Darracott, to the ancestral mansion on the marshland borders of Kent and Sussex. The rest of the family have come to Darracott Place to meet him, and possibly to take in hand his ineligibility. These include his uncle, Matthew, a politician married to the aristocractic Lady Aurelia, and their sons Vincent and Claud; his uncle Rupert's widow Elvira and her children, the rebellious Anthea and the teenaged Richmond. Hugo's father had disgraced himself years before by "marrying a weaver’s daughter" in Huddersfield and his assembled relations are expecting a working- or at most lower middle-class man. Sensing their hostility, Hugo obliges them by adopting a Yorkshire accent and "gaumless" manner to match his large and bovine appearance.

Relations are strained between those of Lord Darracott's grandchildren closer in age to Hugo. Vincent despises his brother Claud; the former is a Corinthian, a handsome man of fashion, while the latter goes to the extreme in being an attention-seeking dandy. Vincent has reason too to resent Hugo, since otherwise he would have been the succeeding heir. Of Elvira Darracott's children, young Richmond is his grandfather's favourite. His dearest wish is to become a soldier, so Lord Darracott is anxious that Richmond should not be influenced by Hugo, a veteran of the Peninsular War. On the other hand, his lordship has directed that Anthea should marry Hugo, a prospect that outrages her, although she becomes reconciled to him when he invents a prior betrothal. She later discovers before all the rest of the family that Hugo is not the simple "noddipol" that he amuses himself pretending to be and she then allows herself to succumb to his genuine love for her.

Meanwhile Hugo has seen that things are not straightforward at Darracott Place. The financial status of the family is precarious: while the lands are clearly rich, the tenants' farms are poorly maintained, as are the family buildings. There is also an isolated Dower house in the grounds maintained by a single servant which is reputed to be haunted. It emerges that Richmond, bored with being kept at home with nothing to do, has assumed the leadership of a smuggling gang operating over Romney Marsh and has staged the hauntings at the Dower House himself in order to scare off attention and use the decayed building as a store for contraband.

Richmond's activities eventually bring him to the suspicious notice of Lieutenant Ottershaw, the self-righteous head of the local Land-Guard Preventive service, who sets a trap for the young man that results in his being shot and badly hurt. Richmond arrives home just ahead of Ottershaw, which gives Hugo enough time to take command and arrange a scene to deceive the lieutenant. Vincent and Richmond appear to be drunkenly playing cards while Claud is bandaged up and given out to have been shot by the relatives of a young woman with whom he had been philandering in Rye, relatives who had previously burst into Darracott Place and been forcibly evicted by Hugo. Ottershaw arrives and high-handedly demands that Richmond strip off the coat that is concealing his bandages but is haughtily outfaced by Lady Aurelia and is forced to leave in fear for his job.

Lord Darracott is so shocked when the result of his harsh conduct is brought home to him that he gives permission for Richmond to join a Hussars regiment in which Hugo has friends. His lordship has already been dumbfounded, as was most of the rest of the family, to learn that Hugo is in fact the Harrow-educated grandson and heir to a wealthy mill-owner with the financial means to reverse the decline in the Darracott holdings. Hugo's future leadership and right to the succession are wryly acknowledged by all.

== A comedy of class consciousness ==
The Unknown Ajax was written by Heyer after a holiday in Rye, a town which features in the novel and is the nearest to the fictional Darracott estate. Hugo Darracott she described in a letter as a completely new kind of hero from her usual stock characters – types satirised here in the brothers Vincent and Claud. The book's title refers to the Greek warrior in Shakespeare’s Troilus and Cressida, where the phrase "the unknown Ajax" appears in a speech in Act III, scene 3, dealing with the deceptiveness of fame and appearance. Vincent also applies other disparaging terms from the play to Hugo, such as "the lubber Ajax" and "the elephant Ajax" in reference to his clumsy size.

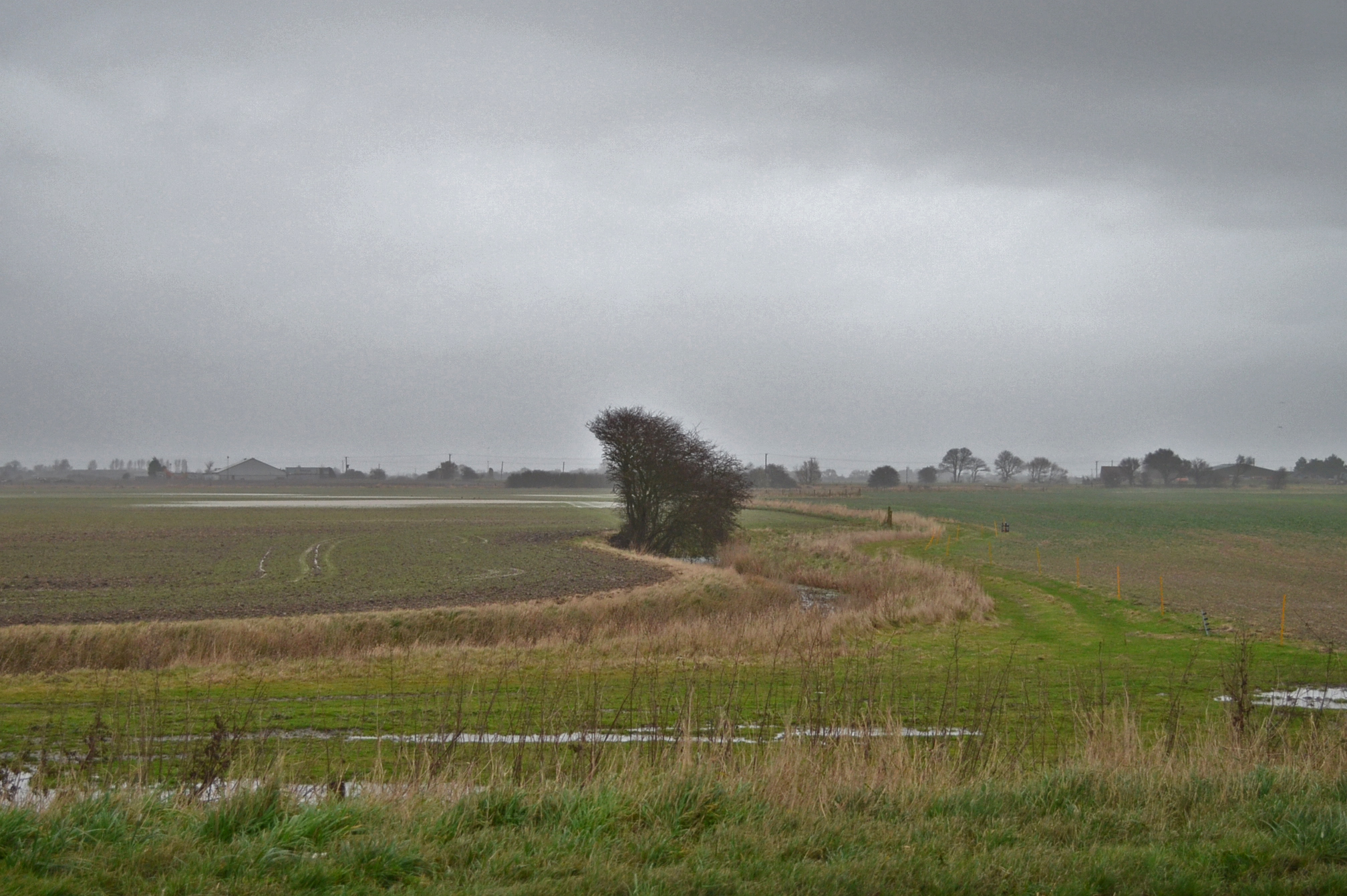
A smugglers landscape, Romney March

Jennifer Kloester has described the novel as among "Georgette Heyer’s most original and clever creations", full of memorable and amusing scenes, during the course of which even minor characters have room to develop. Contributing to this journey of self-discovery, and drawing in the reader as well, are the patterns of deception around which the intricate plotting revolves. Hugo's family, expecting him to be a barely educated yokel, set the foppish Claud to act as his pattern in dress and manners. His obstinate pupil reduces Claud, and most of his family, to despair. Only two of them penetrate the game he is playing with them. Anthea, because she has a strong sense of the ridiculous which responds to Hugo's own, and Lady Aurelia, who perceives his imposture from the start and complains that his one fault is that he will not be serious. Hugo's foil in deception is his cousin Richmond, who feigns delicacy of health and has to retire early to a secluded bedroom because of his difficulty in sleeping. What really keep him awake are his nightly smuggling forays, the discovery of which builds to the story's comic climax.

A parallel theme in the novel is class consciousness, which is often indicated in the use of language to define the various social levels of the characters. At the close of the very first paragraph, the narrative is interrupted by the thoughts of a young footman in the slang of the time:

Charles had not been employed at Darracott Place above six months, but he was not such a whopstraw as to make the least noise in the performance of his duties when his lordship was out of humour. That was the way Chollacombe described as knaggy an old gager as ever Charles had had the ill-fortune to serve. Stiff-rumped, that's what he was, always nabbing the rust, or riding grub, like he had been for months past.

Though Hugo puts on a Yorkshire accent as part of his deceit of the family, his groom John Joseph invariably speaks in even broader dialect, reporting to his master of the ghostly occurrences at the Dower House that

There's been no dragoons stationed thereabouts this while back, and no manner of good gin there had been for Clotton – him as is his lordship's head groom – tells me that they'd got so that they took every bush for a boggart, and reet laughable it was one night when a couple of 'em – nobbut ignorant lads! – came sticklebutt into t'Blue Lion, frining and faffling that there was a flaysome thing jangling round t'Dower House, and wailing fit to freeze t'blood in a body's veins.

The gist of either narration is more or less clear, but the full meaning can only be gained from the specialist vocabularies and dictionaries where the author had collected these expressions in the first place. Far from being rare, performances such as those above come thick and fast, including as they do as a third level the contemporary argot of the gentry between themselves.

A fourth level of comedic social differentiation is manifested in the jockeying for predominance between servants, especially in the case of the two valets Crimplesham and Polyphant, who castigate each other in the politest manner but with the most malign intentions. Crimplesham achieves a triumph in manoeuvring his nephew into the service of the new heir, even though it means a step down in his order of precedence. Polyphant turns the tables by attending his master, Claud, with fervent protestations of loyalty, and shutting Crimplesham out of the room during Hugo's masterly deception of Lieutenant Ottershaw. The same stratagem allows Claud a similar opportunity to shine: not in the continuing contest between himself and his elegant older brother throughout the book, but in the field of melodrama, squeamishly playing the role of the victim of a loutish ambush.

The loser in this conflict is Ottershaw who, after all, has correctly detected the prime mover of the local free trader gang and is in the right in attempting to arrest him. That the lieutenant is outwitted by the coming together of a frivolous aristocratic family generally at odds with each other, but also in a position to overturn any legal challenge the Preventive Land Service may direct against them, is a social injustice, however true it is to its time – and possibly in line with the heavily taxed author's own sympathies at the moment of writing.
