= Beauvallet =

1929 adventure novel by Georgette Heyer

- First US edition
- Author: Georgette Heyer
- Language: English
- Genre: Romance
- Publisher: William Heinemann (UK); Longmans Green (US)
- Publication date: 1929, 1930
- Publication place: United Kingdom
- Media type: Print (Hardback & Paperback)
- Pages: 272 pp
- Preceded by: Simon the Coldheart

Beauvallet is an adventure novel by Georgette Heyer, published in the UK in 1929 by Heinemann and by Longmans, Green & Co. in 1930 in the US.

== Plot summary ==
The year is 1586 and 35-year-old Sir Nicholas Beauvallet (great-great-great-grandson of Simon the Coldheart) - 'El Beauvallet' to the Spanish and called 'Mad Nick' by his men - is one of the most daring pirates of the Elizabethan era. With the blessing of the Queen, this friend and former associate of Sir Walter Raleigh sails the seas in his ship The Venture with the intention of plundering any Spanish ships that come his way. It is while engaged in one such enterprise that he takes the galleon on which the retired and ailing Governor Don Manuel de Rada y Sylva is returning home, accompanied by his daughter Dominica. Having plundered their own ship, Beauvallet promises to take them with him the rest of the way to Spain.

Doña Dominica's haughty spirit appeals to Beauvallet and he vows to come back to claim her within the year. Upon landing in England, he rides on a visit to his elder brother Gerard who, lacking heirs himself, reminds Nicholas that it is his duty to continue the family line. Three months later, Sir Nicholas visits a relation in France and then rides south towards the Spanish border, accompanied by his servant Joshua. There he meets the young Chevalier Claude de Guise, on a mission to deliver a secret message to the Spanish King. On catching the Chevalier trying to steal his horse, Beauvallet kills him in a sword fight and assumes his identity.

Travelling as a Frenchman provides Beauvallet with a convenient disguise in a rigidly Catholic land where the English are abhorred as Protestant heretics. Having arrived in Madrid, he learns that Dominica's father has died and that she is now under the protection of her uncle, Don Rodriguez. But even as he makes contact with Dominica's new family, Beauvallet arouses the suspicion of the French ambassador, M. de Lauvinière, who makes enquiries about him. Henceforward Sir Nicholas must engineer his escape with his chosen bride while avoiding the clutches of the Inquisition, or imprisonment as a spy, and the jealous intrigues of Dominica's other suitors.

== Background ==
According to Jennifer Kloester, Heyer's biographer, the novel's swashbuckling hero, Sir Nicholas Beauvallet, is in the line of those in the books of Baroness Orczy and Rafael Sabatini. The plot, however, was based on the improvised dramas, devised by Georgette for her brothers and friends when they were children. The book was written while Heyer was living with her husband Ronald in what is now the Macedonian town of Kratovo. That Ronald was instrumental in providing a good deal of its historical detail is suggested by his wife's inscribing his copy as "our joint effort".

== Sources ==
Jennifer Kloester, Georgette Heyer, William Heinemann, London 2011.
