= Bill Spence (writer) =

English writer (1923–2024)

William John Duncan Spence (20 April 1923 – 28 May 2024) was an English writer. He wrote war novels as Duncan Spence, and Westerns as Jim Bowden, Floyd Rogers and Kirk Ford. He also used the pseudonym Hannah Cooper. His most successful novels have been historical romances written under the name Jessica Blair.

== Life and career ==
Spence was born in Middlesbrough on 20 April 1923. He worked as a schoolteacher from 1940 to 1943. He saw active service during World War II with Bomber Command. On 1 October 1943, he was commissioned into the Royal Air Force Volunteer Reserve as a pilot officer (on probation). His commission was confirmed and he was promoted to flying officer on 1 April 1944. He was promoted to flight lieutenant (war substantive) on 1 October 1945. He served as a bomber aimer in Avro Lancasters, completing 36 operations. He was a store manager from 1946 to 1977.

Spence later lived in Ampleforth near York. He was nominated for a prize at the 2014 Romantic Novelists' Association Awards; his novel The Road Beneath Me, written under the pseudonym "Jessica Blair," was nominated in the Epic Romantic Novel category. Had he won, he would have been the first male writer to do so. Spence was interviewed in May 2019, at the age of 96, where he discussed his service in World War II and his love of cricket. He suggested that, despite medical problems, he did not intend to stop writing. He retired from writing in May 2020, aged 97, after suffering from a fall.

Spencer turned 100 on 20 April 2023, and died on 28 May 2024, at the age of 101.

== Works ==
=== War novels ===
as Duncan Spence

- Dark Hell, 1959

as Bill Spence

- Bombers Moon, 1981
- Secret Squadron, 1986

=== Westerns ===
as Jim Bowden

- The Return of the Sheriff, 1960
- Wayman's Ford, 1960
- Two Gun Justice, 1961
- Roaring Valley, 1962
- Revenge in Red Springs, 1962
- Black Water Canyon, 1963
- Arizona Gold, 1963
- Trail of Revenge, 1964
- Brazo Feud, 1965
- Guns along the Brazo, 1967
- The Stage Riders, 1967
- Gun Loose, 1969
- Valley of Revenge, 1971
- Trail to Texas, 1973
- Thunder in Montana, 1973
- Showdown at Salt Fork, 1975
- Hired Gun, 1976
- Incident at Bison Creek, 1977
- Cap, 1978
- Dollars of Death, 1979
- Renegade Riders, 1980
- Gunfight at Elm Creek, 1984
- Hangman's Trail, 1986
- Return of the Gunmen, 1988
- Robbery at Glenrock, 1992
- A Man Called Abe, 1993

as Floyd Rogers

- The Man from Cheyenne Wells, 1964
- Revenge Rider, 1964
- Hangman's Gulch, 1974
- Incident at Elk River, 1979

as Kirk Ford

- Trail to Sedalia, 1967
- Feud Riders, 1974

=== Romance ===
as Hannah Cooper

- Time Will Not Wait, 1983

as Jessica Blair

- The Red Shawl, 1992
- A Distant Harbour, 1993
- Storm Bay, 1995
- The Restless Spirit, 1996
- The Other Side of the River, 1997
- The Seaweed Gatherers, 1998
- Portrait of Charlotte,
- The Locket
- The Long Way Home
- The Restless Heart
- Time and Tide
- Echoes of the Past
- Secrets of the Sea
- Yesterdays Dreams
- Reach For Tomorrow
- Dangerous Shores, 2007
- Wings of Sorrow, 2008
- Stay With Me, 2009
- Sealed Secrets
- Secrets of a Whitby Girl
- The Road Beneath Me

=== Non-fiction ===
as Bill Spence

- (with Joan Spence) Romantic Ryedale, 1977
- Harpooned: The Story of Whaling, 1980
- (with Joan Spence) The Medieval Monasteries of Yorkshire, 1981
- (with Joan Spence) Handy Facts: North Yorkshire, 1984
- (with Joan Spence) Stories from Yorkshire Monasteries, 1993
