= Cousin Kate (novel) =

Book by Georgette Heyer

- Author: Georgette Heyer
- Cover artist: Arthur Barbosa
- Language: English
- Genre: Regency, romance
- Publisher: The Bodley Head
- Publication date: 1968
- Publication place: United Kingdom
- Media type: Print (hardback and paperback)
- Pages: 337 pp

Cousin Kate is a 1968 Regency romance novel by Georgette Heyer. The story is set in 1817 and 1818. The novel was written at a point when Heyer, not long after she had recovered from an illness, was reportedly "desperate for a plot" and "still worried about finances".

== Plot summary ==
Kate Malvern is a beautiful orphan who is forced to become a governess when her father dies. However, due to her youth and beauty she loses the job and has to go to her old nurses' house whilst looking for a new position. Despite the fact that she is a lady she thinks of becoming a lady's dresser or opening her own shop and Sarah Nidd, her nurse, decides to take action. She writes to Lady Minerva Broome, Kate's half-aunt, who comes and takes her away to Staplewood. From Aunt Minerva's description, Kate imagines Staplewood to be a warm welcoming home whereas it turns out to be cold and uninviting. Although Aunt Minerva's husband, Sir Timothy, is the very opposite of the lady, he is an invalid and allows Lady Broome to do what she wishes.

Soon after arriving in, Kate meets Torquil, the beautiful but tempermantal Broome heir. Kate soon discovers Aunt Minerva to be controlling even to the point of always having Torquil watched. Everything in Staplewood is very formal, with Sir Timothy in one part of the house and Torquil in another.

Soon she begins to notice strange things however. Torquil seems to be afraid of his mother and always does what she tells him. In the middle of a storm one night, Kate awakes and finds her door locked. Then she hears a man scream. When she asks her aunt the next morning Lady Broome is not able to give a satisfactory answer but merely replies she must have heard Torquil who is afraid of storms. Yet, the scream did not sound like Torquil, but rather more like a full grown man.

Then Mr Phillip Broome arrives, Sir Timothy's beloved nephew. Yet Aunt Minerva seems to hate him and Torquil, before he comes hates and fears him, but when he sees Phillip is delighted to see him. Phillip immediately seems to take a dislike to Kate, though she does not know why, but after getting to know each other, Kate learns that his only reason for disliking her at first had to do with her Aunt.

When Kate does not receive any letters from Mrs Nidd, she becomes worried. She begins to think that her aunt may have something to do with this, but refuses to think of that for more than a second. Her gratitude make such thoughts terrible. Yet when Mr Nidd, Mrs Nidd's father-in-law, arrives, she finds out that none of her letters have made it and the suspicion once more comes to her mind. She quickly writes a note to Sarah via Mr Nidd, knowing that this time it will arrive.

One night, Aunt Minerva asks Kate to marry Torquil. Kate is shocked and refuses, but Aunt Minerva tells her to think on it. Kate's suspicions are further stirred up.

On the journey home Phillip proposes to Kate, but she at first refuses, saying that it was not proper since she had no money, but at Phillip's persistence agrees happily. Yet when they arrive back at Staplewood they find the house in chaos because Aunt Minerva has taken ill. Despite this fact she spends a happier time in the house than with Lady Broome healthy. All too soon Aunt Minerva gets better and once again talks about marriage to Torquil. Kate refuses once more and Lady Broome tells her that it would be payment for all her kindness. Still Kate cannot agree to such a scheme. Therefore, Aunt Minerva tells Kate about why she wished her to marry Torquil. After having to give up a fashionable life Lady Broome had become obsessed with the Broomes and was determined that Torquil had an heir, but Torquil is insane. Therefore, she is determined Kate marry him and Minerva would shut him up. Kate is horrified and leaves the room. When she hears Mrs Nidd's voice she begs her to take her away. Mrs Nidd tells Kate to compose herself and makes herself familiar with the house. Soon Kate has to tell Lady Broome about her engagement with Phillip, but when she does Aunt Minerva has a terrible reaction. She calls Kate a slut and numerous other things that cause her to sleep terribly that night. The next morning she determines to leave as soon as possible, but before she is able to, she has to tell Torquil that she is leaving. He becomes angry, but does not harm her. Yet later on Lady Broome is found dead, having been strangled by Torquil. Torquil then drowns himself in the lake, like he described to Kate at the beginning. Phillip and Kate are left to deal with the tragedy and although Kate is upset about the death of Torquil, Phillip reasons that he would have had an awful life otherwise and that dying was better for him than living.

== Reception ==
Florence Hascall of the Portland Press Herald called it a "comfortable cushion on which one may sink through time to a world that has problems but no nuclear weapons." However, in comparing the novel to The Lost Queen by Norah Lofts, Hascall opined that Lofts's novel was "more poignant" than Cousin Kate as, unlike Lofts, Heyer "does not lighten the facts of an historical situation in which all but three of the characters were actual beings." Barbara Hodge Hall of The Anniston Star wrote that while it is "much the same" as Heyer's other novels, it features her "successful technique of simple plot, bouncy characters and cleverly reproduced slang of the Regency period."

Mari Ness of Tor.com was much more critical of the novel, calling it "very dreary" and "depressing". She considered the characters of Minerva and Torquil to be "unconvincing caricatures of Gothic tropes" and the characters of Kate and Phillip "dull". Ness also criticised the existence of several "minor and major" plotholes, but noted that the depiction of governesses "does ring very true" and that the governesses in the novel were "treated quite well".
