= Frederica (novel) =

1965 novel by Georgette Heyer

- First edition
- Author: Georgette Heyer
- Cover artist: Arthur Barbosa
- Language: English
- Genre: Regency, Romance
- Publisher: The Bodley Head
- Publication date: 1965
- Publication place: United Kingdom
- Media type: Print (Hardback & Paperback)
- Pages: 384 pp

Frederica is a Regency romance novel by Georgette Heyer. The story is set in 1818. The plot is typical of several later Heyer romances in counterpointing the courtships of an older and a younger couple, with variation provided by the antics of Frederica's younger brothers and their boisterous mongrel.

== Plot summary ==
A wealthy bachelor's affluent sisters, whom he dislikes, lobby him to give a ball at his own expense for their daughters' come-out. A distant cousin also asks him to introduce her attractive younger sister to the ton. To the astonishment of all, he agrees to give the ball on condition that his encroaching sisters share it with their unknown cousins. His sisters assume he must be under the spell of the beautiful younger cousin, whereas it is the seemingly unremarkable older cousin, encumbered with raising her three orphaned younger siblings and managing a neglectful older brother, who has caught his carefully concealed interest.

=== More plot detail ===
Frederica Merriville has long been in charge of her younger siblings. Since her parents' death, she has taken it upon herself to make sure that her beautiful sister Charis is well married, believing herself (Frederica) to be on the shelf (too old to be desirable in her social circles). To further this end, she brings the family from their country home to London and introduces herself to a distant relation, the selfish and indolent Marquis of Alverstoke, asking him to sponsor her sister into "the ton" during the subsequent Season.

The Marquis is initially reluctant but agrees to sponsor the Merriville ladies out of mischief, mostly to annoy his sister Louisa who had been demanding similar assistance to launch her own daughter into society. At their combined debut ball, Alverstoke's homely niece is easily outshone by Charis' beauty.

The Merrivilles are liked for their easy, engaging manners and impeccable breeding. Charis is admired by many young men, but ultimately falls for the Marquis’s slow-witted and handsome cousin, Endymion Dauntry. Frederica also gathers admirers. Among them, to his own considerable astonishment, was Alverstoke himself.

Alverstoke is fascinated by her frank and open manners, unlike the society manners of London's fashionable ladies. He is also delighted by the high spirits of the two youngest Merrivilles, her younger brothers, Felix and Jessamy, and comes to like them for their own sakes. He slowly but deeply falls in love with Frederica and is ready to do anything for her sake.

== Characters ==
- Vernon Dauntry, The Marquis of Alverstoke: an elegant, jaded nobleman
- Frederica Merriville: a frank-spoken young woman, and de facto guardian of her three younger siblings while her younger brother Harry attends Oxford
- Felix: Frederica's youngest brother
- Jessamy: Frederica's younger brother
- Charis: Frederica's beautiful sister
- Harry Merriville: Frederica's younger brother and heir to the Merriville Estate
- Miss Seraphina Winsham: maternal aunt and chaperone to Frederica and Charis
- Lufra: Merriville family dog
- Louisa, Lady Buxted: Alverstoke's demanding and selfish elder sister
- Carlton, Lord Buxted: Lady Buxted's son and Frederica's suitor
- Jane: Lady Buxted's daughter
- Augusta, Lady Jevington: Alverstoke's arrogant elder sister
- Gregory: Lady Jevington's son
- Anna: Lady Jevington's daughter
- Sally, Lady Jersey: friend of Alverstoke and “Queen of the Ton”
- Mr. Darcy Moreton: Alverstoke's friend and an unsuccessful suitor to Frederica
- Endymion Dauntry: Alverstoke's young cousin and heir, and Charis's suitor
- Chloë: Endymion Dauntry's sister
- Lady Elizabeth Kentmere: Alverstoke's understanding elder sister
- Charles Trevor: Alverstoke's able and efficient secretary
