= The Great Roxhythe =

1923 historical novel by Georgette Heyer

- First edition cover design
- Author: Georgette Heyer
- Language: English
- Genre: Restoration, Romance
- Publisher: Hutchinson (UK); Small, Maynard and Co. (US)
- Publication date: 1923
- Publication place: United Kingdom
- Media type: Print (Hardback & Paperback)
- Pages: ??? pp

The Great Roxhythe is a novel written by Georgette Heyer. The book opens in 1668 and closes in 1685, and concerns the misadventures of a fictional spy loyal to Charles II.
