= Charity Girl =

1970 novel by Georgette Heyer

- First edition
- Author: Georgette Heyer
- Cover artist: Arthur Barbosa
- Language: English
- Genre: Regency, Romance
- Publisher: Bodley Head
- Publication date: 1970
- Publication place: United Kingdom
- Media type: Print (hardback & paperback)
- Pages: 384 pp
- ISBN: 978-1-4022-1350-2
- OCLC: 209794918
- Dewey Decimal: 823/.912 22
- LC Class: PR6015.E795 C48 2008

Charity Girl is a Regency romance novel by Georgette Heyer, first published in 1970.

== Plot ==
Charity Girl revolves around the character of the twenty-nine-year-old Viscount Ashley Desford and his mission to save Charity Steane from a precarious life with her uncaring relatives. The novel also takes up the Viscount's friendship with Henrietta Silverdale, his neighbour and childhood friend, familiary known as "Hetta".

The narrative opens on a conversation between the Viscount and his father, the Earl of Wroxton. Wroxton asks Desford to look into the affairs of his younger brother Simon. Wroxton fears that Simon has fallen into bad company and will destroy his reputation. Desford declines to interfere in Simon's doings, saying that the last person Simon is likely to listen to is his older brother. In the same conversation, Wroxton also reproaches Desford for having failed to marry Henrietta nine years before. Desford protests that, while he loves Hetta as a sister, there is no passion between them and that she cared to marry him as little as he cared to marry her. Later in the novel it emerges that, at that time, Hetta had begged Desford not to propose marriage to her, even though it was the wish of both their families.

After Desford learns that the latest of Hetta's admirers is Mr. Cary Nethercott, he visits her family home of Inglehurst and meets the man, whom he pronounces appropriate but immensely dull. Later, at a party in the neighbourhood, Desford meets Miss Steane, who prefers to be called "Cherry". She is almost nineteen years old, but is being used as an unpaid servant by the aunt and cousins with whom she has lived since her father abandoned her and failed to pay the bill at her boarding school in Bath.

Desford later encounters Cherry running away from home and, against his better judgment, he makes himself responsible for her welfare and takes her to her grandfather's house in London. However, upon arriving there, it is apparent that Cherry's grandfather, Lord Nettlecombe, has left home for the season, so Desford takes Cherry to stay with Hetta and her mother, Lady Silverdale, for the sake of her reputation. When Desford finally tracks Nettlecombe to Harrowgate, Desford finds that the miserly old man has recently married his housekeeper as a matter of economy. Nettlecombe shows no interest whatsoever in his granddaughter's plight and resents the implication that she is in any way his responsibility. Desford then makes for Bath to see if Cherry's old schoolmistress can find her a situation.

Wilfred Steane, Cherry's disreputable father, who had fled London and was presumed dead, reappears after an absence of many years, hoping to blackmail Desford into marrying Cherry on the grounds that he has compromised her reputation. Since Desford is away, he is vigorously defended by his younger brother, Simon, who pretends that Desford is engaged to Hetta. Simon then rushes over to Inglehurst to forewarn them that Steane is on his way, only to find that Cherry seems to have run away yet again. Arriving at Inglehurst only a few minutes after Steane, Desford baffles the wayward father, whose only interest in his daughter is how he can profit by her.

Cherry is finally discovered out in the country with a sprained ankle by Nethercott, who carries her home, having proposed marriage to her and been accepted. Desford has meanwhile realised from his jealousy at Nethercott's former interest in Hetta that he really cares for her and declares that he does not mean to break off the engagement that his brother invented for them. Hetta admits that she loves him in return and they receive Lady Silverdale's blessing.

Simon, invited to stay to dinner too, excuses himself since he has to make an early start for Brighton the next day. His parting words to his brother are: "But if you should get into any more scrapes, Des, just send me word, and I'll post straight back to rescue you!"

== Critical reception ==
A Publishers Weekly review of Charity Girl describes it as "full of dashing period slang, and it trifles with the affairs of several maids and men with such style and gentle irony that readers of good 'ton,' as Miss Heyer herself might put it, will find reading it a very 'comfortable cose' indeed." Beyond that, Charity Girl has not received a lot of serious critical attention, but it does continue to garner a steady trickle of readers, especially fans of the regency genre. Charity Girl has seventeen reviews, most of them positive, at Google Books. Good Reads posts forty-eight reviews of Charity Girl with an average 3.39 rating out of five. At Library Thing, the novel has a 3.55 out of four rating.
