= Faro's Daughter =

1941 novel by Georgette Heyer

- First edition
- Author: Georgette Heyer
- Language: English
- Genre: Georgian, Romance
- Publisher: William Heinemann
- Publication date: 1941
- Publication place: United Kingdom
- Media type: Print (Hardback & Paperback)
- Pages: 272 pages
- OCLC: 56440965

Faro's Daughter is a Georgian romance novel by Georgette Heyer that was first published in 1941 by Heinemann in the UK and in the US by Doubleday in 1942. The story's focus is on the misfortunes of an aunt and niece trying to run a gambling house for the upper classes.

== Plot summary ==
Eliza, Lady Bellingham, once organised card parties in Clarges Street and, after becoming a widow, tries to gain a livelihood by opening a gambling den in St. James's Square on the other side of Piccadilly. She is aided by her 25-year-old niece Deborah Grantham (known to everyone there as Deb) and the house is guarded by former associates of Lord Bellingham. These include the Irish adventurer Lucius Kennett, who would not mind marrying Deborah himself, and the former pugilist Silas Wantage. Among several other suitors, Deb attracts the aging roué Lord Ormskirk, who wishes to make her his mistress, and the underage Adrian, Lord Mablethorpe.

Deborah is adept at keeping her suitors at arm's length, but Adrian's mother, Selina, Lady Mablethorpe, is aghast at his wish to marry "a hussy out of a gaming house" and calls in her nephew, wealthy 35-year-old Max Ravenscar, to help free her son from this entanglement. Ravenscar initially takes Deborah at his family's evaluation and mortally offends her by his blunt attempt to buy her off. To punish his effrontery, she encourages Mablethorpe's hopes and gets him to invite her to meet his family at a night outing in Vauxhall Gardens.

In order to shock the Mablethorpes even further, Deborah dresses up as a vulgar, tasteless flirt, but while she and Adrian are strolling in the grounds they come across the teenaged Phoebe Laxton weeping by herself in a summer house. Her penniless family has been trying to force her to marry the lecherous Sir James Filey, another customer at the gaming house whose reputation is well known to Deb. Instead, she and Adrian decide to smuggle Phoebe into the house in St James's Square and keep her there under an assumed name until they can persuade the Laxton family to relent.

Meanwhile, Ravenscar, having failed to bribe Deb, tries financial harassment. Ormskirk had formerly bought up some of Lady Bellingham's debts and the St James's Square mortgage in order to put pressure on Deb. Having fallen into debt himself, however, he sells these assets to Ravenscar. To counter the threat of prosecution, Deb arranges for Lucius and Silas to kidnap Ravenscar and hold him prisoner in their cellar until he agrees to relinquish the documents. Though Ravenscar is as stubborn as Deb, her additional hold over him is that he has wagered his famous greys against Filey's blood chestnut horses in a race the next day. He tricks her, however, into leaving a candle in the cellar, with which he burns through the cords round his wrists, and Deb, half in love with him, smuggles Ravenscar up to her room so that she can put ointment on his burns.

Ravenscar allows his cousin Adrian to act as his groom in the race next day and wins. He has begun to respect Deb's resourcefulness by now and sends her the bills and mortgage in recompense; when she scornfully returns them, he tears them up and sends her back the pieces. But by this time Adrian has fallen for Phoebe's hero worship of him as her rescuer, as Deb had planned all along, and Deb accompanies the pair to seek refuge with a Laxton aunt in Wales. On the way they are seen by an acquaintance of Ormskirk, who tries to make Ravenscar believe that Deb has deceived him and eloped with Adrian to Gretna Green.

When Adrian returns in a state of elation, Ravenscar misunderstands the cause of his mood and goes round to denounce Deb to her face, only learning of his mistake later from Lady Mablethorpe. A further misunderstanding leads to the couple's reconciliation, but only in an atmosphere of rough embraces and complacently received insults.

== Faro Ladies and the world of gambling ==
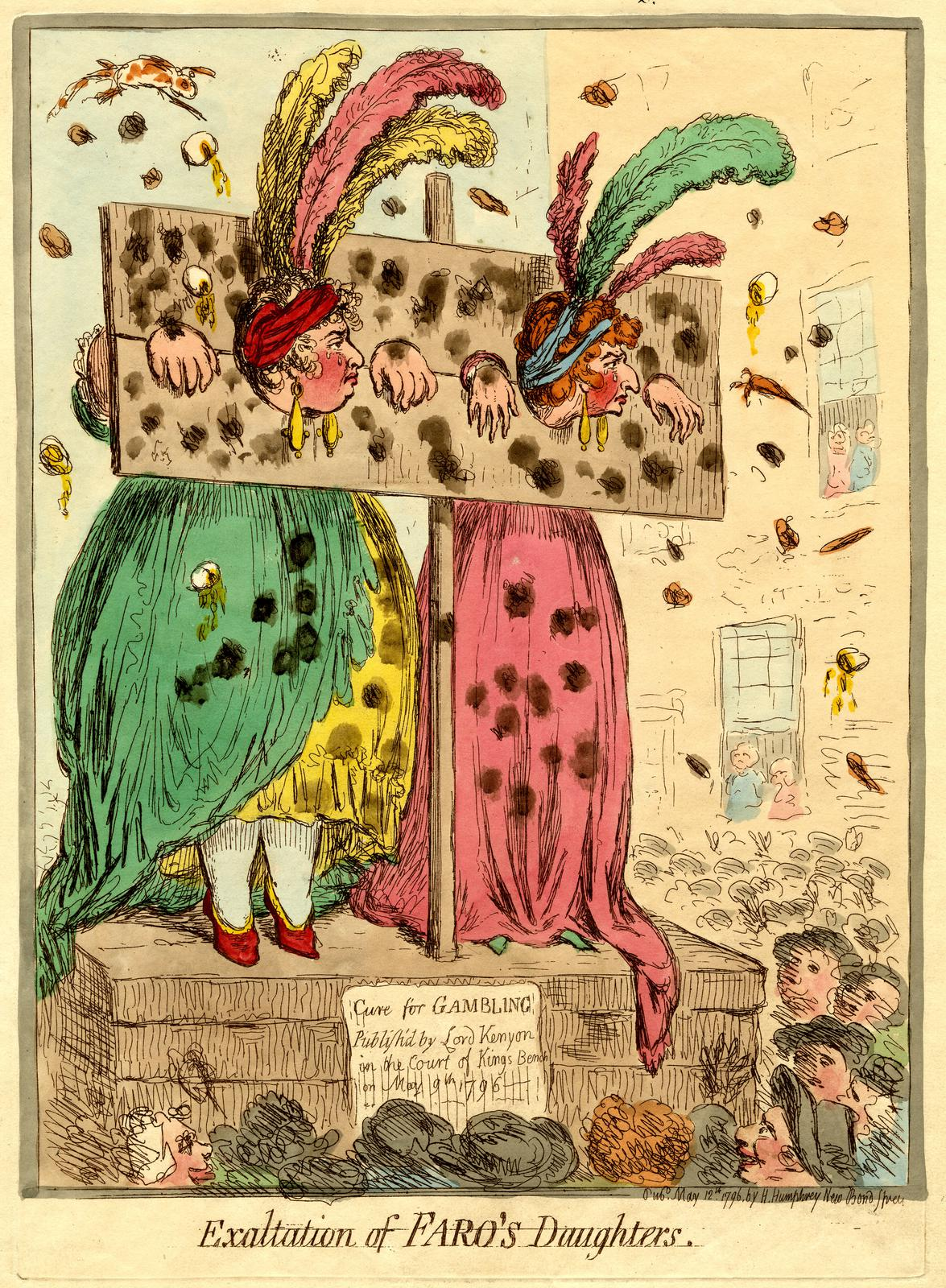
James Gilray's 1796 satiric print of the gambling aristocratic ladies

The story is set in 1795 at a time that William Pitt the Younger has just introduced a tax on the hair powder fashionable among men until then. Agitation against the female gamblers and hostesses known as Faro Ladies was also gaining momentum but had yet to reach the point publicly threatened by Lord Chief Justice Kenyon in May, 1796, that those convicted under the recent gaming laws, "though they should be the finest ladies in the land… shall certainly exhibit themselves at the pillory".

The more precise denomination of "Faro's daughters" was also current and is glanced at in the novel when Lady Bellingham's establishment is compared there to 'one of the Archer-Buckingham kidney', referring to newspaper accusations that the notorious Sarah, Lady Archer and Albinia, Lady Buckinghamshire were fleecing young men at the game of Faro. Both these ladies were the subject of satirical prints by James Gilray and Isaac Cruikshank, labelling them so in 1796.

In chapter 4 of the novel, Deborah applies the phrase to herself in arguing that "I may be one of faro's daughters, but I'll not entrap any unfortunate young man into marrying me". Nevertheless, she is fully aware that Lady Bellingham's gambling house is sailing away from the fashionable card-parties she used to host into morally dubious waters, now that games of speculation such as Faro and the E. O. Table (a form of roulette) had been introduced to their new premises. Such a fall in reputation down the social ladder is of a piece with Heyer's experimenting with a new kind of unaristocratic hero in Mr Ravenscar, commenting ruefully that "The schoolgirls won't like his being a Mere Commoner but I'm so fed-up with writing a lot of wash about improbable dukes and earls. He's fabulously rich, however, but he dresses all anyhow, and hasn't got a quizzing glass, or any graceful habits."

Nevertheless, for all its precise social detail, the novel's reputation has not been high and in particular the romantic attachments formed there have been judged unconvincing.
