= Powder and Patch =

1930 novel by Georgette Heyer

- First edition (under original name)
- Author: Georgette Heyer (under pseudionym of Stella Martin)
- Original title: The Transformation of Philip Jettan
- Language: English
- Genre: Georgian, Romance
- Publisher: Mills & Boon (1923); William Heinemann (1930)
- Publication place: United Kingdom
- Media type: Print (hardback & paperback)
- Pages: 176

'''Powder and Patch''' is the second novel written by Georgette Heyer. It was originally published as The Transformation of Philip Jettan: A Comedy of Manners, by Mills & Boon in 1923 under her pen name Stella Martin. In 1930, the book was republished by William Heinemann, under her own name and without the original last chapter, as Powder and Patch. Its first appearance in the US was from E. P. Dutton in 1968.

== Plot ==
Philip Jettan, a handsome but stolid youth without ambition, has been raised in the Sussex countryside by his father Maurice, who was wild when young but has now settled down. Philip is drawn to a neighbour’s beautiful daughter, Cleone Charteris, and she to him, until the arrival of the exquisite Mr Bancroft makes her discontented with the staid way of life that Philip offers her. Having lost to Bancroft’s superior swordsman after they quarrel, Philip resolves to improve himself and goes to London for advice to his worldly uncle Thomas, who sends him on to Paris in order to acquire some polish. Six months in the French capital are enough to accomplish the required transformation.

Philip becomes the bosom friend of the exquisite young men who make up society. He also becomes a connoisseur of the male adornments of powder and patch and of tastefully matching shades in his personal clothing. This arouses the ire of young Bancroft when he arrives to find ‘le petit Philippe’ so much in favour, and he is incautious enough to allow his annoyance to show. Hearing of Bancroft’s insulting remarks, Philip engineers a meeting in which he names his seconds and challenges Bancroft to a duel. Their early morning meeting becomes almost a public occasion, and Bancroft is this time humiliatingly beaten.

News of their fight is carried back to Sussex, where Cleone, up to then regretting her coldness, is enraged by what she takes as Philip’s unfaithfulness in quarrelling over the favours of a foreign minx. But, no sooner does Philip hear that Cleone has arrived in London to stay with her aunt, Lady Malmerstoke, than he returns in haste and arranges to stay with his Uncle Tom, complete with Jacques and François, his servants, and two carriages full of fashionable attire.

Once he returns, however, Cleone begins to realize that she wants the old Philip in place of the insincere puppy she believes that he has become. Several chapters of involved misunderstanding follow, at the end of which Cleone becomes inadvertently promised to two admirers in the same evening and Philip is obliged to engage one of them in swordplay before he promises his silence. Meanwhile his father and Cleone’s aunt conspire to bring the estranged lovers together, not before time.

== Development ==
The story is set near the start of the 1750s, a detail established by the reference to Philip’s London uncle being “deep in the latest copy of The Rambler, a periodical that appeared between 1750-52, on his return from Paris. Another period detail is the fact that his family home in the fictional village of Little Fittledean is inland from Brighthelmstone, as Brighton was known before Regency times.

The scene of the novel begins in Sussex, but thereafter drifts between London and Paris. In place of subtleties of plot, the story was described as "a comedy of manners" in the original edition. In the final chapter there, Philip, Cleone and Sir Ralph move back to a life of social triumph in Paris. With the omission of that in the 1930 edition, it is assumed that the couple will abandon the artificiality of life in the capital, whether the French or the English, and return to the same unassuming existence as his father had led after his own marriage.
