= Agnes Mure Mackenzie =

Scottish historian and writer (1891–1955)

Agnes Mure Mackenzie CBE
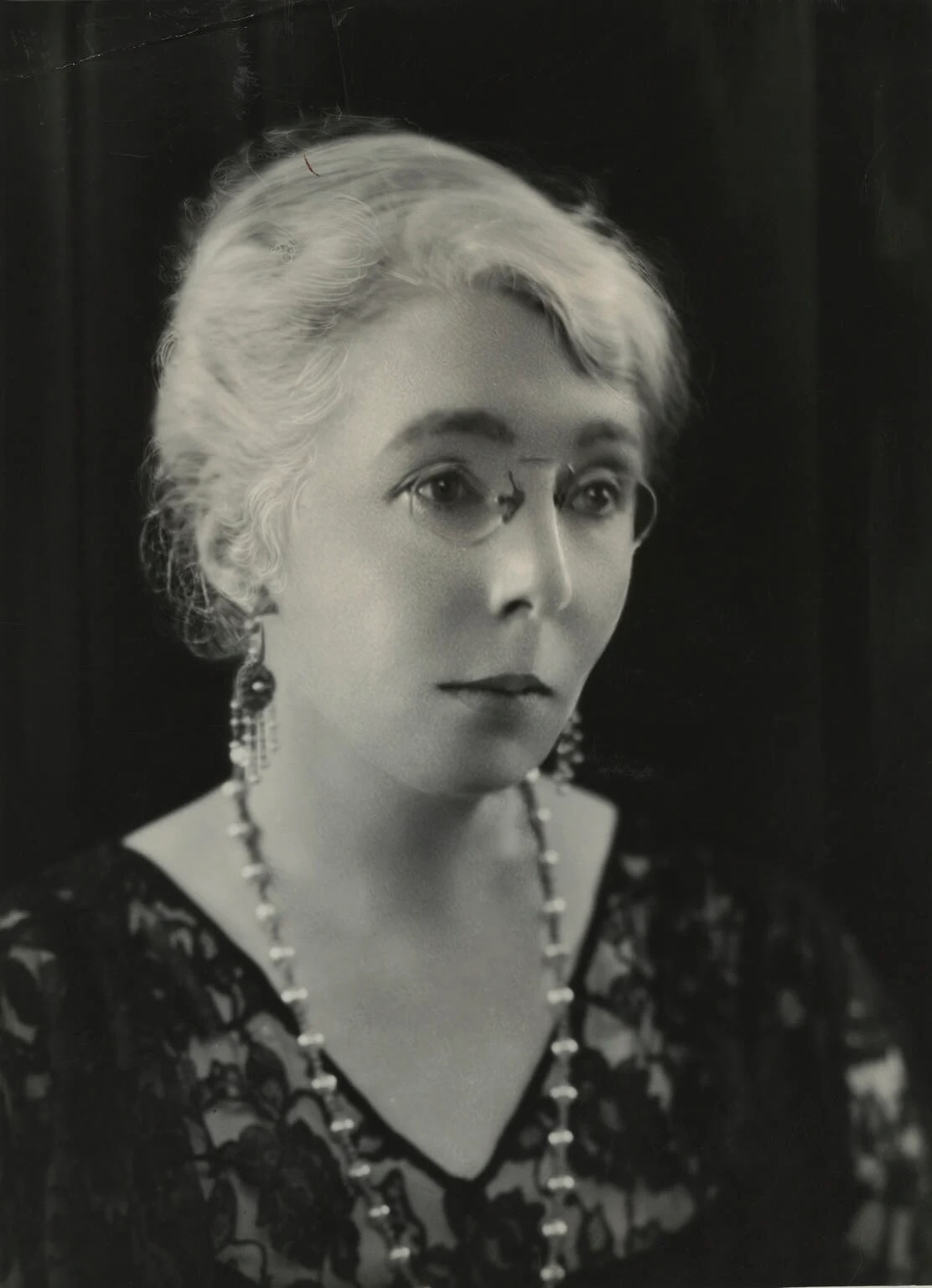
- Mackenzie in 1934
- Born: 9 April 1891; Stornoway, Scotland
- Died: 26 February 1955 (aged 63); Edinburgh
- Occupation: Historian

Agnes Mure Mackenzie CBE (9 April 1891 – 26 February 1955) was a Scottish historian and writer. Her middle name is frequently misspelled Muir.

== Life ==
Mackenzie was the daughter of physician and surgeon Dr Murdoch Mackenzie and Sarah Agnes Mackenzie (née Drake); Agnes was born in Stornoway on Lewis, then a busy fishing port. In childhood she was taken seriously ill with scarlet fever, the after-effects of which left her with poor hearing and eyesight. Educated at home until the age of fourteen, she then attended the Nicolson Institute until the age of seventeen. She then left Lewis for Aberdeen. As an undergraduate at the University of Aberdeen she studied English literature and edited the university magazine.

During the First World War she was an assistant lecturer at the university and an instructor at the local teacher training centre. After the war she worked as an assistant lecturer at Birkbeck College but was dismissed after five years. She described herself as having "no money, no sort of influence, and no professional training of any kind, except a completely useless Arts degree". This crisis led to her career as a novelist. Her first novel Without Conditions was published in 1923—The Quiet Lady, a semi-sequel, appeared in 1926— and her dissertation for the degree of Doctor of Letters, The women in Shakespeare's plays, was published in 1924. Seen as a "new and distinctly feminist approach to the topic" (Noble, quoting Lenz, Greene & Neely (eds), The Women's Part: Feminist Criticism of Shakespeare), this was reprinted on four occasions during the twentieth century. She published two more novels, a play, two works of literary criticism—The Process of Literature and The Playgoer’s Handbook to the English Renaissance Drama—during the 1920s. Mackenzie was a frequent contributor of reviews to The Times Literary Supplement and the New Statesman, she also lectured, and worked as a reader for publishers.

It appeared as though Mackenzie would return to working as an educator when she was hired to teach an adult education course on Scottish literature. However, enrollments for the course were insufficient and it was cancelled. She made use of her preparations for teaching the course to produce An Historical Survey of Scottish Literature to 1714, published in 1933. This work also led to her 1934 biography of King Robert, Robert Bruce, King of Scots. A controversial work, but well received by the reading public and reprinted, Mackenzie's study was the first serious effort which matched the popular conception of Bruce as hero, rather than the hitherto predominant academic view of Bruce as "a treacherous and rather contemptible figure" (Noble, quoting Mackenzie). She wrote two historical novels for younger readers on Bruce's life, I was at Bannockburn (1939) and Apprentice Majesty (1950).

Robert Bruce, King of Scots was retrospectively subsumed into Mackenzie's six-volume history of Scotland as volume two. The other volumes were The Foundations of Scotland (1938), The Rise of the Stewarts (1935), The Scotland of Queen Mary and the religious wars 1513–1638 (1936), The Passing of the Stewarts (1937), and Scotland in modern times 1720–1939 (1941). The single-volume The Kingdom of Scotland: a short History appeared in 1940, while a school textbook history, A History of Britain and Europe for Scottish Schools, was published in 1949. She also produced a four-volume series, Scottish Pageant (1946–1950), which presented translated excerpts from documents relating to Scotland for a mass audience. A member of the Scottish Episcopal Church, Mackenzie was not afraid to criticise Scotland's sacred cows, comparing John Knox to Adolf Hitler and describing John Calvin's Geneva as a totalitarian statelet. In 1941 she was elected as the Honorary President of the Saltire Society. Her 1942 pamphlet for the Society, The Arts and the Future of Scotland, rejected the idea of national art as proposed by Hugh MacDiarmid and J. D. Fergusson.

She was made a commander of the Order of the British Empire in 1945 for services to Scottish literature and Scottish history. In 1951 she received the honorary degree of Doctor of Laws from Aberdeen. She died suddenly in Edinburgh in 1955, and was buried in Grange Cemetery. The Saltire Society established the Saltire History Book of the Year Award in her honour on the tenth anniversary of her death.

== References and further reading ==
- Donaldson, William, " Mackenzie, Agnes Mure (1891–1955)" in the Oxford Dictionary of National Biography. Oxford, 2004. Online edition
- Noble, Joan Morrison, "An Islander in Exile: Agnes Mure Mackenzie & Memories of the Hebrides" in History Scotland, volume 7, number 1 (January/February 2006), pp. 23–29. ISSN 1475-5270
- Noble, Joan Morrison, "Dr. Agnes Mure Mackenzie: The Journey from Novelist to Historian" in History Scotland, volume 8, number 1 (January/February 2007), pp. 49–53. ISSN 1475-5270
- Shepherd, Nan, "Agnes Mure Mackenzie. C.B.E., M.A., D.Litt., LL.D. A Portrait" in Aberdeen University Review, volume 36 (1955–1956), pp. 132–140
- Smith, Nadia Clare, "Nationalism, Gender, and Irish and Scottish Historiography, 1919–1939: A Comparison of Helena Concannon and Agne Mure Mackenzie" in Alexander, Murphy & Oakman (eds), To the other Shore: Cross-currents in Irish and Scottish Studies. Belfast, 2004. (Proceedings of the April 2002 Cross-Currents conference at the University of Aberdeen.)
