= The Corinthian (novel) =

1940 book by Georgette Heyer

- First edition
- Author: Georgette Heyer
- Language: English
- Genre: Regency, Romance
- Publisher: William Heinemann
- Publication date: 1940
- Publication place: United Kingdom
- Media type: Print (hardback & paperback)
- Pages: 240 pp

The Corinthian is a regency novel by Georgette Heyer.

== Plot summary ==
Sir Richard Wyndham, an accomplished Corinthian, is being forced into marriage by his family, who want him to have an heir. Depressed by the life laid out before him, he nevertheless agrees to this course. The night before he is to announce his choice he comes across Penelope Creed, a young girl in boys' clothes, hanging helplessly from an upper story window. She is a very wealthy orphan who is running away from her own distasteful marriage plans. The two become allies, leave London in search of Miss Creed's childhood sweetheart, and find themselves in the middle of a dangerous game of mystery, theft, and murder.

== Characters ==
Richard/Beau Wyndham aka Mr. Brown – At twenty-nine he is extremely wealthy, a leader of the ton, and an accomplished sportsman, living in St. James's Square. He is a member of White's and an arbitre of fashion, with his clothes made by Weston & his boots by Hoby. His cravat is tied to his own design – the Wyndham Fall – a style much emulated by his admirers. He has remained unmarried because he is convinced that prospective brides are only interested in his money. In a drunken moment he insists on accompanying Pen Creed to her childhood home. In the process he avoids a betrothal to Melissa Brandon, whose family are relying on him to help them out of their financial difficulties.

Penelope (Pen) Creed aka Penn Brown, Penn Wyndham – Orphaned at the age of twelve, Pen was sent to live in London with her uncle's family, the Griffins. At seventeen, and 'cursed' with a large fortune, Pen is put under pressure by Mrs. Griffin to marry her son Frederick. In an effort to avoid this fate she decides to run away to Piers Luttrell, her childhood sweetheart in Somerset, where she has her own estate. In her desperation to escape she agrees to Sir Richard Wyndham's accompanying her on her travels. Pen is a very pretty young lady, tall & slender, with guinea gold hair and eyes of cornflower blue.

George, Lord Trevor – George is a rotund man in his early thirties, with an unfortunate penchant for extravagant & fashionable dress. He is a friend & brother-in-law of Richard Wyndham and protests (uselessly) that Richard should not have to marry Melissa "the iceberg" Brandon. He has an estate in Berkshire, as well as a home in London.

Louisa, Lady Trevor – Richard's sister and George's wife. She is a handsome woman of thirty-one, with a great deal of decision in her face, and a leavening gleam of humour. She has one son in leading strings. She rules her husband with a rod of iron, and together with her mother makes every effort to ensure her brother Richard marries & settles down.

Aurelia, Lady Wyndham – Richard and Louisa's mother, A wealthy widow of ten years standing living in a charming house in Clarges St. Lady Wyndham is a determined woman who uses her apparent delicate state of health to get her own way. A beauty in her youth her looks have faded but, like her daughter, she has excellent taste in dress. Her main aim in life is to see her son Richard respectably married, preferably to Melissa Brandon.

Melissa Brandon – The eldest daughter of Lord and Lady Saar. A handsome young woman, though proud and cold-hearted. She is willing to become betrothed to Sir Richard Wyndham to save her family from financial ruin. She doesn't believe in love for people of her kind, and is described as an iceberg.

Beverley Brandon – Melissa's brother, he is a wastrel & gambler, with a bad reputation. Despite having his debts paid by Sir Richard Wyndham he is again deeply in debt. He is not above theft & blackmail to save himself from financial ruin. Unfortunately his partners in crime discover he is trying to doublecross them, with terrible consequences.

Cedric Brandon – Melissa's other brother, the elder son of Lord & Lady Saar. A rakish young gentleman of lamentable habits, and a disastrous charm of manner. He advises Richard not to marry his sister Melissa, and would gladly allow Richard to buy him a commission in the army, when sober. However he is only sober six hours out of the twenty-four. He calls in the Bow Street Runners when the family diamonds are stolen.

Lord Saar – Disreputable head of the Brandon family, living in Brook St. Deeply in debt, he is relying on his daughter Melissa marrying Sir Richard Wyndham to repair the family fortunes. He has taken to brandy in the face of his imminent ruin.

Frederick Griffin – Cousin of Penelope Creed. A young man with a face like a fish and a wet mouth, being importuned by his mother to marry Pen Creed.

Piers Luttrell – Childhood friend of Penelope Creed, he is secretly betrothed to Lydia Daubenay. He is twenty-one years old, and described as a pleasant-faced young man with a good pair of shoulders and easy, open manners. He was at Oxford with Beverley Brandon, and Beverley spends some time at his home. He discovers a body in the woods where he had arranged an assignation with Lydia Daubenay. Pen Creed believed herself to be betrothed to Piers and ran away to him.

Lydia Daubenay – A rather silly young lady who is secretly betrothed to Piers Luttrell. She is a pretty girl, of about seventeen, small, plump, and brown haired. In an effort to hide her betrothal to, and meetings with, Piers Luttrell she pretends that Pen Creed (in her boy's disguise) is her suitor. Lydia faints after witnessing a murder, much to Pen's disgust.

Jimmy Yarde – Thief whom Sir Richard Wyndham & Pen Creed meet during their travels. He is involved in the theft of the Brandon Diamonds.

Horace Trimble – Thief in league with Beverley Brandon & Jimmy Yarde. His rank is probably false. Lydia Daubenay witnesses him commit murder in the spinney near Queen Charlton. He is subsequently arrested by the Bow Street Runners at Bristol.
