= Maurice Magnus =

American traveler and author

- Born: November 7, 1876
- Died: November 4, 1920 (aged 43); Malta
- Notable work: Memoirs of the Foreign Legion

Maurice Magnus (7 November 1876 – 4 November 1920) was an American traveller and author of Memoirs of the Foreign Legion (1924), which exposed the cruelty and depravity of life in that French army unit in 1916–17 and tells of his desertion from it. The book is known for D. H. Lawrence's 80-page introduction to it. Magnus and Lawrence knew each other from November 1919 to May 1920.

== Life ==
Magnus's father was Jewish-American, and his mother "believed herself the illegitimate daughter of Wilhelm I, King of Prussia and first German Kaiser," but "there is no surviving evidence to show that Hedwig Liebetrau was a Hohenzollern."

Frances Wilson writes:

Magnus learned to speak several languages badly, to produce indifferent prose, to mismanage money, to appreciate good food and to keep up appearances. He wanted to be known as a 'littérateur ' ('littérateur!' mocked Lawrence, '—the impossible little pigeon!'), and his adventures in the world of letters can be traced through the curious trail of publications he left behind. In his early twenties Magnus wrote a play called Eldyle about a visionary who turns his back on the world and builds a monastery to which young and beautiful men can retreat....

Eldyle was published in 1898. In the same year Magnus is credited as a 'translator and compiler' in the American Colonial Handbook, volumes one and two. In 1901 he worked — probably as manager — for a new literary magazine called the Smart Set, which would later publish a number of Lawrence's poems and stories. In 1902 he abandoned the Lutheran church and converted to Catholicism, and by 1903 he had left America for good and was to be found in Berlin, writing articles for the Berlin Times and Florence Herald. For a brief period, Maurice Magnus was Berlin correspondent for the New York Herald.

Magnus was reportedly the manager of the dancer Isadora Duncan. "Isadora later maintained that Magnus had been her secretary, not her manager." Magnus was also the manager of the English theater set designer (and Duncan's lover) Edward Gordon Craig. Keith Cushman writes, "The business relationship with Craig and Duncan was not a success."

Magnus was homosexual, but in 1913 he married Lucy Seraphine Ardoine Bramley-Moore, daughter of William Bramley-Moore; "they were officially separated in 1917". Minutes before his suicide in Malta, to avoid arrest for debt, he made Norman Douglas his literary executor.

== Works ==
Magnus's Memoirs of the Foreign Legion, published in 1924, four years after his death, was notable for igniting a long-running feud between two of the most distinguished expatriate English authors, D. H. Lawrence and Norman Douglas, who had been close friends of his. Both the book and the feud surrounding it touched on homosexuality and bisexuality in a way that could not legally be referenced at the time. More recent revelations have added new insights into Lawrence as the prophet of love.

His memoirs in their original form, titled Dregs: Experiences of an American in the Foreign Legion, were unpublishable. But "Lawrence was intent on getting Magnus's book published. He recognized that it would be easier to place if he supplied an Introduction. He wrote the 'Memoir of Maurice Magnus' in Taormina in January 1922". Norman Douglas protested that Lawrence's introduction had maligned Magnus as an unprincipled spendthrift and had exaggerated Lawrence's own generosity towards him. Lawrence published a letter to the editor in reply. As Lawrence seldom ventured into biography, Douglas said he detected the fiction-writer's touch in this introduction. An early draft of the introduction in manuscript, now in the possession of the University of Nottingham, shows that Lawrence had intended an even more savage denunciation of Magnus.

"Lawrence used Magnus as a model for his creation of the fictional character Mr. May, the theatrical agent in The Lost Girl." Magnus is also "recognizable ... as the mischievously named Little Mee in Aaron's Rod (1922)." Lawrence biographer Frances Wilson claims that Lawrence's poem The Mosquito is "a summing up of his relations with Magnus to date and a parody of his belief in a blood brotherhood." She also claims that, in Lawrence's poem "Bibbles," Magnus is Bibbles, the "snub-nosed bitch."

== Bibliography ==
- Aldington, Richard (1941). Life for Life's Sake: A Book of Reminiscences. New York: The Viking Press. pp. 375–376. OCLC 1150225579. OL 6429419M.
- Blanchard, Lydia. Review of Keith Cushman, ed. D. H. Lawrence: Memoir of Maurice Magnus. The D. H. Lawrence Review, Vol. 21, No. 1 (Spring 1989), pp. 67–68.
- Cleves, Rachel Hope (2020). Unspeakable: A Life beyond Sexual Morality. University of Chicago Press. ISBN 978-0226733531. Biography of Norman Douglas.
- Cooper, Harriet. "Lawrence, Magnus, and Monte Cassino", D. H. Lawrence Review, vol. 26, No. 1/3 (1995-1996), pp. 149–165.
- Cushman, Keith, ed. (1987). D. H. Lawrence: Memoir of Maurice Magnus. Including: D. H. Lawrence and Maurice Magnus: A Plea for Better Manners, by Norman Douglas; Lawrence's Letter to the New Statesman, 20 February 1926; Excerpts from Dregs: Experiences of an American in the Foreign Legion, by Maurice Magnus. Santa Rosa, California: Black Sparrow Press. ISBN 978-0-87685-716-8
- Douglas, Norman (1946). Late Harvest. London: Lindsay Drummond. pp. 52–53.
- Fraser, Keath. "Norman Douglas and D. H. Lawrence: A Sideshow in Modern Memoirs", The D. H. Lawrence Review, vol. 9, no. 2, (1976), pp. 283–295.
- Lawrence, D. H. "The Late Mr Maurice Magnus: A Letter". New Statesman, 20 February 1926.
- Lawrence, D. H. "Accumulated Mail", in The Borzoi 1925: Being a sort of record of ten years of publishing (New York: Knopf, 1925), pp. 119–128; reprinted in D. H. Lawrence, Phoenix: The Posthumous Papers, 1936, pp. 799–805, and in D. H. Lawrence, Reflections on the Death of a Porcupine and Other Essays, Cambridge University Press, 1987, pp. 237–245. Two paragraphs in the essay, on pp. 120–121 in The Borzoi 1925, p. 800 in Phoenix, and p. 240 in Reflections, discuss Lawrence's Introduction to Memoirs of the Foreign Legion.
- MacNiven, Ian S. Review of Keith Cushman, ed. D. H. Lawrence: Memoir of Maurice Magnus. English Literature in Transition, 1889-1920, Vol. 32, No. 3, 1989, pp. 360–364.
- Reeve, N. H. and John Worthen. "1921-1922: Maurice Magnus", in D. H. Lawrence, Introductions and Reviews, Cambridge University Press, 2005, pp. xl-li.
- Vassallo, Peter. "D.H. Lawrence, Montecassino and the 'Spirit of Place'", Journal of Anglo-Italian Studies, 2017.
- Wilson, Frances. Burning Man: The Trials of D. H. Lawrence, Farrar, Straus and Giroux, 2021; Burning Man: The Ascent of D. H. Lawrence, Bloomsbury Circus, 2021.
- Wright, Louise E. "Disputed Dregs: D. H. Lawrence and the Publication of Maurice Magnus' Memoirs of the Foreign Legion", The Journal of the D. H. Lawrence Society (1996), pp. 57–73.
- Wright, Louise E. "The Death of Maurice Magnus", in D. H. Lawrence, Introductions and Reviews, Cambridge University Press, 2005, pp. 419–428.
- Wright, Louise E. Maurice Magnus: A Biography, Newcastle, Cambridge Scholars Publishing, 2007. Review by John Worthen.

== External sources ==
- Memoirs of the Foreign Legion (pdf online)
