= South Wind (novel) =

1917 novel by Norman Douglas

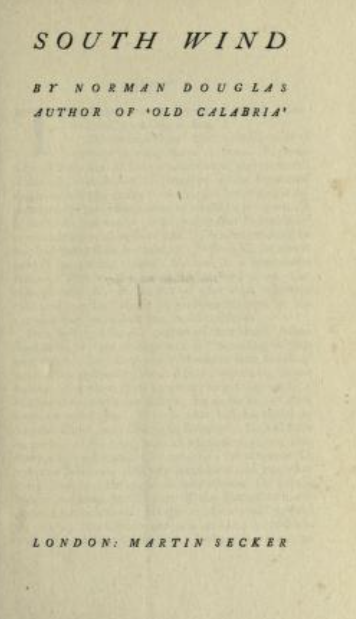
- Title page for South Wind (1917)
- Author: Norman Douglas
- Language: English
- Genre: Satire; Comedy
- Set in: Kingdom of Italy
- Publisher: Martin Secker
- Publication date: 1917
- Publication place: United Kingdom
- Dewey Decimal: 823.912

South Wind is a 1917 novel by British author Norman Douglas. It is Douglas's most famous book and his only success as a novelist. It is set on an imaginary island called Nepenthe, located off the coast of Italy in the Tyrrhenian Sea, a thinly fictionalized description of Capri's residents and visitors. The narrative concerns twelve days during which Thomas Heard, a bishop returning to England from his diocese in Africa, yields his moral vigour to various influences. Philosophical hedonism pervades much of Douglas's writing, and the novel's discussion of moral and sexual issues caused considerable debate.

The South Wind of the title is the Sirocco, which wreaks havoc with the islanders' sense of decency and morality. Much of the natural detail in the book is provided by Capri and other Mediterranean locations that Douglas knew well. The island's name Nepenthe denotes a drug of Egyptian origin (mentioned in the Odyssey) which was capable of banishing grief or trouble from the mind. The novel was written in Capri and in London, and after its publication in June 1917 it went through seven editions rapidly, achieving startling large-scale success. Critics at the time complained about the lack of a well-constructed plot. The book was adapted for the stage in London in 1923 by Isabel C. Tippett, and Graham Greene considered the possibility of writing a film script based on it.

Paul Fussell writes:

South Wind appears to be "a novel," but its earliest readers ... sensed its proximity to the travel book.... There is a plot, a boyishly subversive one, but it's there less for its own sake than as a justification for the "travel" essays, which treat Nepenthe like an actual island visited by an actual curious traveler."

In Dorothy Sayers' 1926 detective novel Clouds of Witness, Lord Peter Wimsey goes through the possessions of a murdered man – a young British man living in Paris, whose morality had been put in question. Finding a copy of South Wind Wimsey remarks, "Our young friend works out very true to type".

"When Charles Ryder, the hero of Evelyn Waugh's Brideshead Revisited, arrives at Oxford in 1923, Douglas's South Wind is one of three books that he stacks on his shelf. Critics have credited South Wind with inspiring a raft of new novels by young authors, including Crome Yellow (1921) and Those Barren Leaves (1925) by Aldous Huxley, and The Rock Pool (1936) by Cyril Connolly". South Wind also appeared on the shelf of a character in Vladimir Nabokov's The Real Life of Sebastian Knight.

In Robert McAlmon's Being Geniuses Together, he mentions meeting Norman Douglas in Venice in 1924, by which time he says South Wind was a minor classic. Apparently when sales continued for years afterwards, Douglas, to whom only a small amount was paid to begin with, received no further payments.

== Bibliography ==
- Aldington, Richard (1954). Pinorman: Personal recollections of Norman Douglas, Pino Orioli and Charles Prentice. William Heinemann Ltd.
- Cleves, Rachel Hope (2020). Unspeakable: A Life beyond Sexual Morality. University of Chicago Press. ISBN 978-0226733531. A biography of Douglas.
- James, Jamie. "'South Wind,' A Strange Literary Best-Seller, A Hundred Years Later" The New Yorker, June 21, 2017.
- Orel, Harold (1992). Popular Fiction in England, 1914-1918. University Press of Kentucky. ISBN 9780813117898.
- Ousby, Ian (1996). Cambridge Paperback Guide to Literature in English. Cambridge University Press. ISBN 0-521-43627-3.
- Rennison, Nick (2009). London Blue Plaque Guide (4th ed.). The History Press. ISBN 9780752499963.
- Stringer, Jenny (1996). The Oxford Companion to Twentieth-century Literature in English. Oxford University Press. ISBN 9780192122711.
