= Aaron's Rod (novel) =

1922 novel by D. H. Lawrence

- First edition (US, publ, Thomas Seltzer)
- Author: D. H. Lawrence
- Language: English
- Genre: Picaresque novel
- Publisher: Thomas Seltzer
- Publication date: 1922
- Publication place: United States
- Media type: Print
- OCLC: 1935128

Aaron's Rod is a picaresque novel by D. H. Lawrence, started in 1918 and published in 1922.

== Background ==
The title refers to the rod of Aaron in the Old Testament, Moses' brother who built the Golden Calf in the desert for the worship of the Israelites. The rod, his divine symbol of authority and independence, finds its echo in the flute of Aaron Sisson.

== Synopsis ==
Aaron Sisson, a union official in the coal mines of the English Midlands, is trapped in a stale marriage. He is also an amateur, but talented, flautist. At the start of the story he walks out on his wife and two children and decides on impulse to visit Italy. His dream is to become recognised as a professional musician. During his travels he encounters and befriends Rawdon Lilly, a Lawrence-like writer who nurses Aaron back to health when he is taken ill in post-war London. Having recovered his health, Aaron arrives in Florence. Here he moves in intellectual and artistic circles, argues about politics, leadership and submission, and has an affair with an aristocratic lady. The novel ends with an anarchist or fascist explosion that destroys Aaron’s instrument.

== Publication history ==
The February 1922 issue of The Dial contained part of chapter 14 of Aaron's Rod. Nicholas Joost and Alvin Sullivan write:

Although chapter 14 of Aaron's Rod is one of the central chapters of the novel it is also one of the weakest and neither advances the relationship of Aaron and Lilly nor reveals any internal characterization of Aaron.... The part of the chapter that appeared in the Dial lends itself naturally to publication as a self-contained excerpt." It was titled "An Episode".

The full novel was published in 1922 by Thomas Seltzer in New York.

== Reception ==
In his Introduction to the Penguin Books edition of Aaron's Rod, Steven Vine writes:

John Worthen notes, Aaron's Rod 'has ... had a bad press'. Worthen shows how many of the novel's critics argue that it is formless, clumsily organized and desultory in movement; that it pursues its aims, in Frank Kermode's words, 'with virtually complete indifference to the form of the novel'. For other critics, however, the novel's hesitant and episodic form is the sign of its peculiar engagement in the post-War world. Terry Eagleton, for instance, sees in Aaron's Rod and Kangaroo (1923) a 'radical rupturing and diffusion of literary form' which is symptomatic of Lawrence's 'near total ideological collapse' after the War, while Judith Ruderman reads the 'picaresque quality' of the novel as capturing 'the chaos of Europe and the disintegration of human relationships' in the same period.

== People portrayed ==
According to Richard Aldington's Life for Life's Sake (1941), p. 375 (and also Aldington's Pinorman (1954), pp. 165, 185), the character James Argyle in Aaron's Rod is based on Norman Douglas. Aldington saw the character Lilly as Lawrence himself, and Aaron as John Middleton Murry; the relationship between Lilly and Aaron in the novel mirrors that of Lawrence and Murry. According to Lawrence biographer Frances Wilson, Aldington himself is portrayed in Aaron's Rod: "Aldington is Robert Cunningham, 'a fresh, stoutish young Englishman in khaki.'" Wilson adds that Aldington's wife, the poet H.D., is also portrayed in Aaron's Rod; she is Cunningham's wife Julia, "a tall stag of a thing ... hunched up like a witch". Wilson also writes that Maurice Magnus is "recognizable ... as the mischievously named Little [Louis] Mee in Aaron's Rod". Another British writer, Reginald Turner, was the model for the character "little Algy Constable" in Aaron's Rod.

Steven Vine adds that "an actual 'Aaron Sisson' [was] killed in action in 1915. Aaron's flute-playing in the novel is modelled on the musical activities of Thomas Cooper, a neighbour of the Lawrences.... Josephine Ford is based on Dorothy ('Arabella') Yorke (b. 1892), an American living at Mecklenberg Square; Cyril Scott is based on Cecil Gray (1895-1951), music critic and composer. Jim Bricknell is based on Captain James Robert White (1979-1946), an officer in the Gordon Highlanders.... Rawdon Lilly is Lawrence's recreation of himself, and his wife, Tanny, is based on Frieda Lawrence. Struthers, the painter ... is modelled on the artist Augustus John (1878-1961). Clariss Browning is based on the writer Brigit Patmore (1882-1965). In the Italian episodes, Sir William Franks is based on Sir Walter Becker (1855-1927), a wealthy shipowner ... ; and Walter Rosen [is based] on Leo Stein (1872-1947), brother of the writer Gertrude Stein."
