= Norman Douglas =

British writer

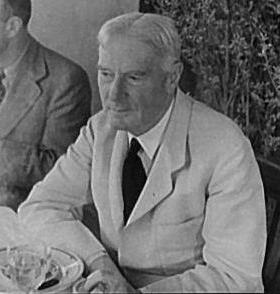
- Douglas in 1935
- Born: George Norman Douglass; 8 December 1868; Thüringen, Austria-Hungary
- Died: 7 February 1952 (aged 83); Capri, Italy
- Resting place: Cimitero acattolico ("Non-Roman-Catholic cemetery"), Capri; 40.5514°N 14.2345°E
- Occupation: Writer
- Spouse: Elizabeth Louisa Theobaldina FitzGibbon (1898–1903)
- Writing career
- Pen name: Normyx; Pilaff Bey
- Language: English
- Notable works: South Wind; Old Calabria; Some Limericks

George Norman Douglas (8 December 1868 – 7 February 1952) was a British writer, now best known for his 1917 novel South Wind. His travel books, such as Old Calabria (1915), were also appreciated for the quality of their writing.

His sexual encounters with children—girls and boys, some as young as eleven—led to charges of indecent assault and his flight from England to Italy. He subsequently fled Florence to avoid arrest for the rape of a 10-year-old girl. His biographer Rachel Hope Cleves described him in 2020 as "[b]y present standards ... a monster".

== Life ==
Norman Douglas was born in Thüringen, Austria (his surname was registered at birth as Douglass; he dropped the second s as an adult). His mother was the German-Scottish aristocrat Vanda von Poellnitz (1840–1902). His father, John Sholto Douglass (1838–1874), was the 15th Laird of Tilquhillie. He was the manager of a local cotton mill; in his spare time, he was an archaeologist, researching the history of the Vorarlberg, and was also an enthusiastic mountaineer. Douglas's paternal grandfather, the 14th Laird of Tilquhillie, had established the factory in the 1830s, in order to pay off debts on his ancestral lands in Aberdeenshire. Douglas's maternal great-grandfather was General James Ochoncar Forbes, 17th Lord Forbes. Douglas had an older brother, John, and a younger sister, Mary. John "remained devout throughout his life, but Douglas came to consider religion a pernicious absurdity". "In September 1874, when Douglas was five years old, his father, John Sholto Douglass, fell a thousand feet to his death while hunting chamois in the mountains". "It's probable that the death of his father, a devout Presbyterian, contributed to Douglas's rejection of religion".

Five years after Douglas's father died, his mother married Jakob Jehly, a local painter. Both her Douglas in-laws and her own von Poellnitz family objected to the marriage, because Jehly was of a peasant background, Catholic, and fourteen years younger than Vanda. They pressured Vanda to send Douglas and his brother John to school in England, which she did. Douglas never mentioned the remarriage in any of his writings.

Douglas spent the first years of his life on the family estate, Villa Falkenhorst, in Thüringen, and was brought up mainly at Tilquhillie, Deeside, his paternal home in Scotland. He was educated at Yarlet Hall, then at a Leicestershire vicarage under the Rev. Green before attending Uppingham School in England, and finally, at a Gymnasium in Karlsruhe. He was fluent in German and English during his youth and later learnt French and Italian. Douglas developed an interest in natural science as a child and began contributing articles to papers about zoology at the age of 18.

Douglas started in the diplomatic service in 1894 and from then until 1896 was based in St. Petersburg. He was placed on leave after an alleged affair. In 1897 he bought a villa (Villa Maya) in Posillipo, a maritime suburb of Naples. The next year he married a first cousin, Elizabeth Louisa Theobaldina FitzGibbon, known as Elsa; their mothers were sisters, daughters of Baron Ernst von Poellnitz. They had two children, Louis Archibald (Archie) and Robert Sholto (Robin), and Norman's first published book, Unprofessional Tales (1901), was written in collaboration with Elsa and first appeared under the pseudonym Normyx. However, the couple divorced in 1903 because of Elizabeth's infidelity. Douglas then moved to Capri, began dividing his time between the Villa Daphne there and London, and became a more committed writer. Nepenthe, the fictional island setting of his novel South Wind (1917), is Capri in light disguise. His friends on the island included the opium addict Jacques d'Adelswärd-Fersen.

From 1912 to 1916 Douglas worked for The English Review. He met D. H. Lawrence through this connection. From 1918 to 1920, Douglas contributed fifteen pieces to the Anglo-Italian Review, "detailing his travels throughout Italy" and including descriptions of "charming boys and girls."

Douglas's novel They Went (1920), whose original title was to have been “Theophilus”, is a fantasy based on Breton folklore.

D. H. Lawrence based the character James Argyle in his novel Aaron's Rod (1922) on Douglas, which, according to Richard Aldington, led to a falling out between the two writers, which Douglas denied. Lawrence also wrote an introduction to Maurice Magnus's book, Memoirs of the Foreign Legion, which was published two years after Aaron's Rod. Douglas criticized the introduction in A Plea for Better Manners. In Life for Life's Sake (1941), p. 375, Aldington writes that Lawrence's portrait of Douglas in Aaron's Rod "was the real cause of the breach between those two and of Norman's anti-Lawrence pamphlet, though the ostensible casus belli was Lawrence's superbly written introduction to the Memoirs of Maurice Magnus". In Late Harvest (1946), Douglas wrote, "No. The playful caricature of myself in Lawrence's Aaron's Rod is not the reason why I took up arms against him. The reason was that he had distorted the character of a dead friend of mine [Maurice Magnus] whose memory I wished to defend." Rachel Hope Cleves is in accord with Douglas, writing that, despite objections Douglas expressed in private letters to Lawrence's portrayal of him in Aaron's Rod, "Douglas remained friendly with Lawrence. The breaking point came two years later, when Lawrence published the memoirs of their mutual friend Maurice Magnus, who had committed suicide in 1920". Aldington, however, sticks to his position, writing in Pinorman (1954), p. 191, "that even after the publication of the Magnus pamphlet ... Norman was trying to use the annoyance created by Aaron's Rod against its author."

In the book Twentieth Century Authors Douglas is quoted as stating that he disliked Marxism, Puritanism and "all kinds of set forms, including official Christianity".

During Douglas's years in Florence he was associated with the publisher and bookseller Pino Orioli, who published books by Douglas and other English authors in his Lungarno series. Many of these books, notably the first edition of Lawrence's Lady Chatterley's Lover, might have been prosecuted for obscenity if they had been published in London. Douglas probably had a major hand in writing Orioli's autobiography, Adventures of a Bookseller.

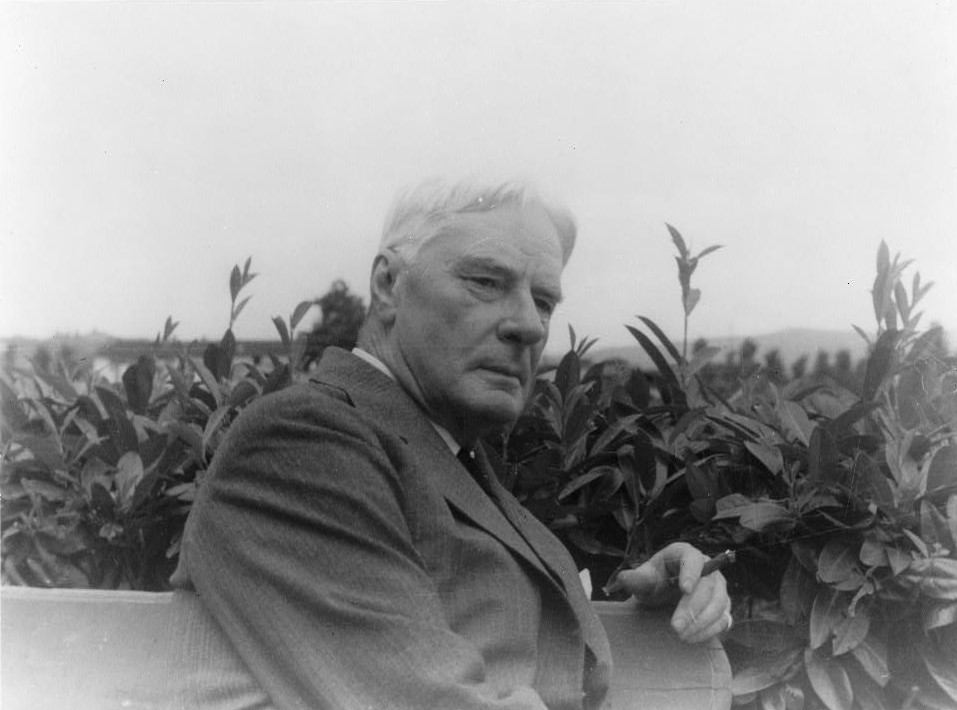
Douglas in 1935

The possibility of arrest for raping a child led Douglas to flee Italy for the South of France in 1937. Following the collapse of France in 1940 Douglas left the Riviera and made a circuitous journey to London, where he lived from 1942 to 1946. He published the first edition of his Almanac in a tiny edition in Lisbon. He returned to Capri in 1946 and was made a citizen of the island. His circle of acquaintances included the writer Graham Greene, the composer Kaikhosru Shapurji Sorabji and the food writer Elizabeth David.

Douglas died in Capri, apparently after deliberately overdosing himself on drugs after a long illness (see Elisabeth Moor, An Impossible Woman: The Memories of Dottoressa Moor of Capri). As he lay dying, he was approached by German nuns who offered assistance and his last words are reputed to have been: "Get those fucking nuns away from me." The Latin inscription on his tombstone, from an ode by Horace, reads: Omnes eodem cogimur, "We are all driven to the same end".

== Sexual encounters with children ==
Douglas biographer and historian of sexuality Rachel Hope Cleves writes, "In the Berg Collection room at the New York Public Library, I came across Norman Douglas's transcriptions of the travel diaries of Giuseppe "Pino" Orioli ... Orioli and Douglas were boon companions in Florence, where Douglas lived during the 1920s and '30s. The two men went on numerous walking tours together in Italy and abroad ... Douglas's transcriptions ... didn't sanitize his accounts of Douglas's paid sexual encounters with the boys they met along the way."

Cleves adds, "In 1923, when he was fifty-four years old, ... Douglas boasted that he'd had sex with eleven hundred virgins during his lifetime. Those were just the girls. In his thirties, he switched mostly to boys. No one knows how many boys there were." "Sex between adults and children," Cleves writes, "was more normal during Douglas's early adulthood than it is now." "Douglas entered into a series of long-lasting relationships with boys," some of whom "remained bound to Douglas throughout their adult lives."

"[M]any of his former child lovers held him in ... high esteem ... [and] simply did not view sex with adult men as traumatic, even after they had come of age." One brought his family on visits to see Douglas, the last time in 1951," the year before Douglas died. That particular boy had been poor and a delinquent, and his "delinquency may have extended to prostitution." Cleves writes, "Although it may seem strange to modern parenting sensibilities, it makes sense that when a fine gentleman showed up ... offering to educate their turbulent son by bringing him to Italy, they readily agreed [, e]ven if they understood that Douglas's offer of mentorship came at a sexual price." Douglas "fulfilled his promise to ... educate their son," making him "keep a diary, ... work on lists of vocabulary words and practice writing by composing formal letters to his friends back home."

In 1916, Douglas was charged with an indecent assault against Edward Carey Riggall, age 16, at Douglas's home. "Two friends stood bail for Douglas". In 1917, he was charged with the indecent assault of two boys, cousins Robert and Esmond Knight, but Faith Compton Mackenzie provided him with an alibi, which "helped to get Douglas released on bail, enabling him to flee Britain and resettle in Italy". "In May 1937, Douglas fled Florence, fearing that he was about to be arrested for raping a 10-year-old girl."

"By present standards," Cleves writes, Douglas "was a monster. During his lifetime he was considered a great man, including by many of the children who had sexual encounters with him."

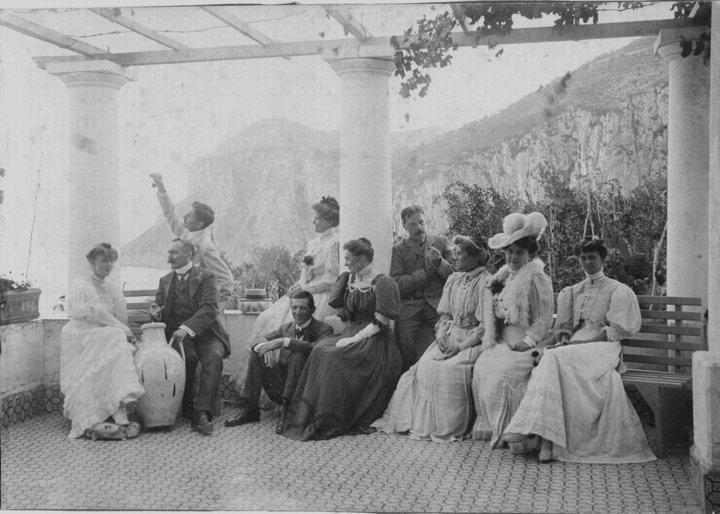
Visiting the Villa Torricella Capri (October 1906). Norman Douglas sits in the middle, leaning against the column.

== Reception ==
H. M. Tomlinson, a contemporary of Douglas's, concluded his 1931 biography by saying that Douglas's kind of prose "is at present out of fashion". He found his writing "at times as ruthless in its irony as Swift's" and "as warm and tender as Sterne's".

Peter Ackroyd describes Douglas's London Street Games as "a vivid memorial to the inventiveness and energy of London children, and an implicit testimony to the streets which harboured and protected their play."

John Sutherland reports that "Douglas's Mediterranean travel writing chimed with the public taste", and that "there was a time when, in smart literary conversations, Norman Douglas was regarded as one of the smartest things going. Part of that smartness was his keeping, for the whole of his long depraved life, one jump ahead of the law."

In "The Grand Tour and Beyond: British and American Travellers in Southern Italy, 1545–1960" (which is chapter 4 of The Evolution of the Grand Tour: Anglo-Italian Cultural Relations since the Renaissance), Edward Chaney wrote that "the true heir to the great tradition of the 'pedestrian tour' in our own [20th] century has been 'pagan-to-the-core' Norman Douglas. Having first visited the south of Italy with his brother in 1888, before he was 30 he had abandoned his pregnant Russian mistress and his job at the British Embassy in St Petersburg and purchased a villa at Posillipo. By then he had also published his first piece on the subject of southern Italy ...".

== Works ==
Douglas's most famous work, South Wind, is a fictionalised account of life in Capri, with controversial references to moral and sexual issues. It has been frequently reprinted.

His travel books combine erudition, insight, whimsicality, and fine prose. These works include Siren Land (1911), Fountains in the Sand, described as "rambles amongst the oases of Tunisia" (1912), Old Calabria (1915), Together (Austria) (1923), Alone (Italy) (1921), and the short “One Day” (Greece) (1929). Reviewing Douglas's work in Italian Americana, John Paul Russo wrote:

Douglas ... published three travel books of his walking tours of Italy: Siren Land, ... Old Calabria ... and Alone.... Scholars prefer the first; Douglas and his aficionados, the third; but the common reader has decided upon the middle work as the masterpiece.

Douglas's early pamphlets on Capri were revised in Capri (privately published, 1930). His last published work was A Footnote on Capri (1952).

In 1928, Douglas published Some Limericks, an anthology of more-or-less obscene limericks with a mock-scholarly critical apparatus. This classic (of its kind) has been frequently republished, often without acknowledgment in pirate editions. A definitive edition has now been published.

Looking Back and Together are among Douglas biographer Rachel Hope Cleves's "favorite Douglas books".

=== List of works ===
- Unprofessional Tales (T. Fisher Unwin, 1901) as "Normyx" with his then wife Elsa FitzGibbon. ("supernatural short stories")
- Nerinda (G. Orioli, 1901)
- The Forestal Conditions of Capri (Adam Bros., 1904)
- Three Monographs: The Lost Literature of Capri/Tiberius/Saracens and Corsairs in Capri (Luigi Pierro, 1906)
- Some Antiquarian Notes (Giannini & Figli, 1907)
- Siren-Land (J. M. Dent, 1911), travel book
- Fountains in the Sand: Rambles Among the Oases of Tunisia (Martin Secker, 1912)
- Old Calabria (Martin Secker, 1915), travel book
- London Street Games (St. Catherine Press, 1916)
- South Wind (Martin Secker, 1917), novel
- They Went (Chapman & Hall, 1920), novel
- Alone (Chapman & Hall, 1921), travel book
- Together (Chapman & Hall, 1923), travel book
- D. H. Lawrence and Maurice Magnus: A Plea for Better Manners (Privately printed, 1924, reprinted with changes in Experiments, 1925)
- Experiments (Privately printed, later Chapman & Hall, 1925)
- Birds and Beasts of the Greek Anthology (Privately printed, 1927)
- In the Beginning (Privately printed, 1927), novel
- Some Limericks: Collected for Students & ensplendour’d with Introduction, Geographical Index, and with Notes etc. (Privately printed, 1928, Atlas Press)
- One Day (The Hours Press, 1929)
- How About Europe? Some Footnotes on East and West (1929, Chatto & Windus, 1930)
- Capri: Materials for a Description of the Island (G. Orioli, 1930)
- Paneros: Some Words on Aphrodisiacs and the Like (G. Orioli, 1930), essay
- Three of Them (Chatto & Windus, 1930)
- Summer Islands: Ischia and Ponza (Desmond Harmsworth, 1931)
- Looking Back: An Autobiographical Excursion (Chatto & Windus; Harcourt, Brace and Company, 1933), memories of people Douglas knew.
- An Almanac (1941, Chatto & Windus/Secker & Warburg, 1945)
- Late Harvest (Lindsay Drummond, 1946), autobiography
- Venus in the Kitchen editor (Heinemann, 1952), cookery, written under the pseudonym Pilaff Bey
- Footnote on Capri (Sidgwick & Jackson, 1952)

== Douglas in fiction ==
- James Joyce's Finnegans Wake (1939) makes several dozen references to London Street Games.
- "When Charles Ryder, the hero of Evelyn Waugh's Brideshead Revisited, arrives at Oxford in 1923, Douglas's South Wind is one of three books that he stacks on his shelf."
- Compton Mackenzie's Vestal Fire, a novel set among socialites on Capri, has a character based on Douglas called Duncan Maxwell.
- Vladimir Nabokov's character Sebastian Knight in The Real Life of Sebastian Knight (1941) owns a copy of South Wind.
- Vladimir Nabokov's Lolita (1955). According to Frances Wilson, "Douglas, Nabokov told his wife, was a 'malicious pederast', and as such is surely the model for Lolita's Humbert Humbert. Nabokov ensures Douglas a part in the novel: Gaston Godin, Humbert's homosexual colleague at Beardsley College, has a photograph of Norman Douglas on his studio wall ...".
- Patricia Highsmith's protagonist in The Tremor of Forgery (1969) rereads a favourite passage of Fountains in the Sand.
- Anthony Burgess's Earthly Powers (1980) makes occasional reference to Douglas.
- Robertson Davies's character John Parlabane refers to Douglas in the Cornish Trilogy novel, The Rebel Angels (1980).
- Roger Williams's Lunch with Elizabeth David (1999), according to Rachel Hope Cleves, "exceeded all who came before him in praising [Douglas] . . . describ[ing] Douglas's love for food and for boys as twinned expressions of his joie de vivre".
- D. H. Lawrence's Aaron's Rod (1922). According to Richard Aldington's Life for Life's Sake (1941), p. 375 (and also Aldington's Pinorman (1954), pp. 165, 185), the character James Argyle, in Aaron's Rod, is based on Douglas.
- "Aldous Huxley drew on Douglas for characters in three of his novels: Crome Yellow (1921), Those Barren Leaves (1925), and Time Must Have a Stop (1944)". The characters based on Douglas in the three novels were, respectively, Mr. Scogan, Mr. Cardan, and Eustace Barnack.
- "Francis King's 1992 novel The Ant Colony, about postwar Florence, depicted Douglas as a dirty old bugger who paid boys to jack off in front of him."
- "Alex Preston's 2014 novel, In Love and War, set in Florence during the 1930s, portrayed Douglas as a heartless monster."
- "In Hans Fischer's novel Violet (published under the pseudonym Kurt Aram), the character modeled after Douglas, Herbert von Strehlen, falls in love with the character modeled after Elsa, Violet Fitzalan."
- Richard Aldington caricatured Douglas as "Mr. Philboy" in his 1938 novel Seven against Reeves: A Comedy-Farce. Rachel Hope Cleves comments, "He may as well have called him Mr. Buggerer".

== Bibliography ==
- Aldington, Richard (1954). Pinorman: Personal Recollections of Norman Douglas, Pino Orioli and Charles Prentice. William Heinemann Ltd. "Pinorman" combines Giuseppe Orioli's nickname "Pino" with Douglas's first name, "Norman". Orioli and Douglas traveled extensively together and were so close that they were known to their friends as "Pinorman". Cleves (2020) discusses Pinorman at pp. 264–272.
- Aldington, Richard. "Errant Knight of Capri: Norman Douglas, the legendary author of South Wind, now in his seventies, still insists upon complete personal freedom" Esquire, December 1, 1941. Douglas's disapproval of the article is discussed in Cleves (2020), pp. 239–241.
- Brackett, Virginia; Gaydosik, Victoria (2006). The Facts on File Companion to the British Novel: Beginnings through the 19th century. Infobase Publishing. ISBN 9780816074976.
- Cleves, Rachel Hope (2020). Unspeakable: A Life beyond Sexual Morality. University of Chicago Press. ISBN 978-0226733531. The author describes the book as "a full retelling of Norman Douglas's life, highlighting the historical and interpretative questions that his life provokes, as a window onto the past" (p. 12). These questions focus on how a man who, "[b]y present standards ... was a monster," "[d]uring his lifetime ... was considered a great man," even though "[e]veryone" "knew about his sexual life" (p. 1).
- Cushman, Keith, ed. (1987). D. H. Lawrence: Memoir of Maurice Magnus (unexpurgated). Including: D. H. Lawrence and Maurice Magnus: A Plea for Better Manners, by Norman Douglas; Lawrence's Letter to the New Statesman, 20 February 1926; Excerpts from Dregs: Experiences of an American in the Foreign Legion, by Maurice Magnus. Santa Rosa, California: Black Sparrow Press. ISBN 978-0-87685-716-8. Dregs was the name of the "typescript of Maurice Magnus's Memoirs of the Foreign Legion". Cushman (1987), p. 8.
- Davenport, John (1955). 'Introduction' to a reprint of Old Calabria.
- Dawkins, Richard MacGillivray. Norman Douglas. G. Orioli, Florence, 1933 (Lungarno series). Enlarged and revised edition: Rupert Hart-Davis, London, 1952.
- FitzGibbon, Constantine (1953). Norman Douglas: A Pictorial Record. New York: The McBride Company.
- Fussell, Paul (1980). "Norman Douglas's Temporary Attachments", in Abroad: British Literary Traveling Between the Wars. Oxford University Press, pp. 119–130.
- Holloway, Mark (1976). Norman Douglas: A Biography. Secker & Warburg.
- Leary, Lewis (1968). Norman Douglas. Columbia Essays on Modern Writers, Columbia University Press.
- McDonald, Edward D. (1927). A Bibliography of the Writings of Norman Douglas: With Notes by Norman Douglas. The Centaur Book Shop, Philadelphia.
- Meusberger, Wilhelm (2004). Norman Douglas: A Portrait. Edizione La Conchigli, Via le Botteghe, Capri.
- Ouditt, Sharon (2013). Impressions of Southern Italy: British Travel Writing from Henry Swinburne to Norman Douglas. Routledge. ISBN 9781134705139.
- Sutherland, John (2011). Lives of the Novelists: A History of Fiction in 294 Lives. Profile Books. ISBN 9780300179477.
- Tomlinson, Henry Major (1931). Norman Douglas. 'The Dolphin Books', Chatto & Windus, London.
- Woolf, Cecil (1954). A Bibliography of Norman Douglas. Rupert Hart-Davis, London.
