= Giuseppe Orioli =

Giuseppe Orioli may refer to:

- Giuseppe Orioli (bookseller) (1884–1942), Italian bookseller
- Giuseppe Orioli (painter) (1681–1750), Italian painter
