= Giuseppe Oriolo =

Giuseppe Oriolo may refer to:

- Giuseppe Orioli (painter) (1681-1750), Italian painter
- Giuseppe Orioli (bookseller) (1884-1942), Florentine bookseller
