= Oriolo (disambiguation) =

Oriolo is a town and commune in the province of Cosenza, Italy.

Oriolo may also refer to:

- Oriolo Romano, comune (municipality) in the Province of Viterbo, Italy
- Oriolo (surname)

== See also ==
- Oriol
- Orioli
