= Padmore =

English-language surname

Padmore may refer to:

Surname

- Albert Padmore (born 1944), West Indies cricketer
- Dawn Padmore (born 1967), Liberian classical singer and recitalist
- George Padmore (1903–1959), Pan-Africanist, journalist, and author
- Hal Padmore (1927–1995), Canadian cricketer
- Mark Padmore (born 1961), British tenor
- Thomas Padmore GCB (1909–1996), British civil servant (Permanent Secretary to the Treasury)

Given name

- Padmore Enyonam Agbemabiese (born 1965), Ghanaian poet and scholar

== See also ==
- Padmanoor
- Patmor
- Patmore (disambiguation)
- Pedmore
