= Klinghoffer =

Klinghoffer is a German surname. Notable people with the surname include:

- Clara Klinghoffer (1900–1970), Austrian-born English artist.
- David Klinghoffer, author and essayist at the Discovery Institute, and proponent of intelligent design
- Josh Klinghoffer (born 1979), musician and record producer from Los Angeles, California, and former guitarist for the Red Hot Chili Peppers
- Leon Klinghoffer (1916–1985), disabled American who was murdered and thrown overboard in the hijacking of the cruise ship Achille Lauro in 1985
- Yitzhak Klinghoffer (1905–1990), Israeli jurist and politician

== See also ==
- The Death of Klinghoffer, opera by contemporary American composer John Adams
