= Oriolo (surname) =

Oriolo is a surname. Notable people with the surname include:

- Don Oriolo (born 1946), American artist, musician, and writer
- Giovanni da Oriolo (fl. 15th century), Italian painter
- Giuseppe Oriolo (1681–1750), Italian painter
- Joe Oriolo (1913–1985), American cartoon animator, writer, director, and producer

== See also ==
- Oriol
- Orioli
