= Patmore =

Patmore is a surname that refers to:

- Andy Patmore (born 1968), Australian rugby league player
- Brigit Patmore (1888–1965), English writer
- Coventry Patmore (1823–1896) English poet and critic
- Derek Patmore (1908–1972), English writer
- Emily Augusta Patmore (1824–1862), British author, inspiration for poem The Angel in the House
- Nigel Patmore (born 1960), Australian field hockey player
- Peter George Patmore (c. 1786 – 1855), British periodical writer
- Peter Patmore (born 1952), Australian politician
- Simon Patmore (born 1987), Australian para-athlete
- Warren Patmore (born 1971) English professional football player
