= Irene Rathbone =

Novelist (1892–1980)

- The Bookseller, 1952
- Born: 11 June 1892; Edgbaston, England
- Died: 21 January 1980 (aged 87); Lower Quinton, England

Irene Rathbone (11 June 1892 – 21 January 1980) was an interwar novelist known for her 1932 novel We That Were Young.

== Life ==
Rathbone was born in Edgbaston in 1892. Her father's family was from Liverpool where the Rathbones were successful liberals. Her mother was Mary Robina, born Mathews, and her father, George, manufactured brass and copper items. She went to a Dame and later boarding school and she had two younger brothers.

Before the war she was an aspiring actor. After it started she was initially working in canteens but she was trained as a Voluntary Aid Detachment nurse where she was posted to France before returning to nurse in London. Her friend was a munitions worker during the war. Rathbone's brother died of pneumonia while part of the forces occupying Germany in 1919 and in the following year her fiancée was killed in Iraq.

Richard Aldington helped her publish her semi-autobiographical novel We That Were Young in 1932. It tells the story of a single woman who loses her brother and lover during the war. She lives a semi-bohemian life, joining 750,000 surplus women, and she treats her existence "with indifference". Rathbone and Aldington had an affair that ended in 1937. Rathbone dedicated her 1936 novel They Call it Peace to him, and she wrote a long poem, Was There a Summer?: A Narrative Poem, in 1943 about their relationship. They Call It Peace consists of overlapping stories based around the war. It was said to be more politically aware than her previous work and to show more developed writing skills.

Rathbone died in 1980 in Lower Quinton.
