= Bruscello =

Folk theatre

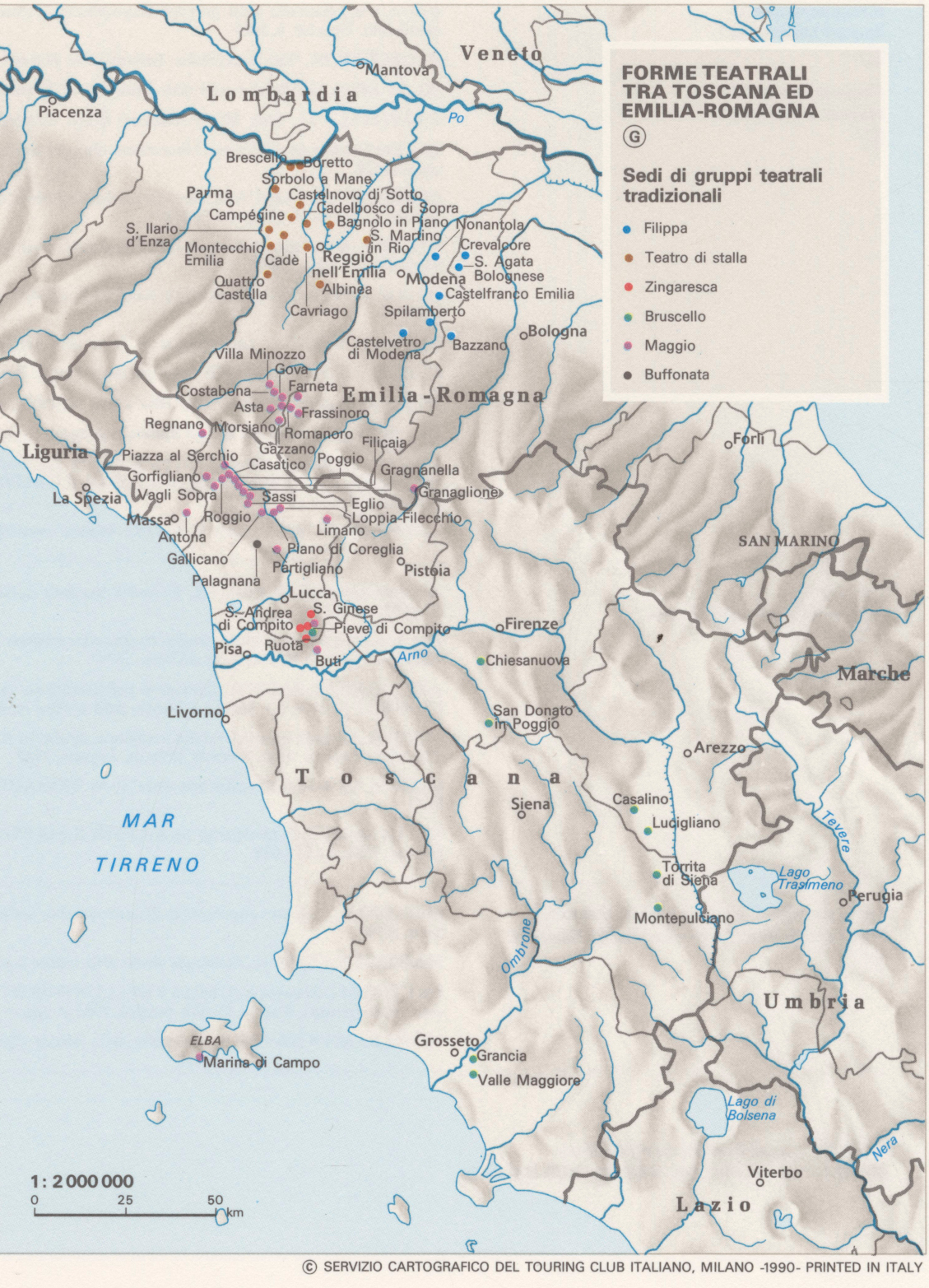
Map of traditional theatre in Tuscany and Emilia-Romagna

Bruscello is form of folk theatre with songs and music performed every year in the Tuscan town of Montepulciano, on or around 15 August. The word comes from arboscello, meaning small tree - one of the players always carries a small tree. Its origins, probably pagan, are unknown but it has been performed here for the last 500 years, and in its current form for the last 60 or so. In his book Italian Pageant Derek Patmore provides a detailed description of the 1947 performance that recounts the story of S. Margherita of Cortona.
