= Death of a Hero =

1929 novel by Richard Aldington

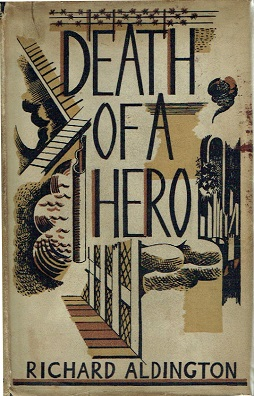
- First edition cover Illustration by Paul Nash
- Author: Richard Aldington
- Publisher: Chatto & Windus
- Publication date: 1929
- Pages: 398
- OCLC: 2308288

Death of a Hero is a World War I novel by Richard Aldington. It was his first novel, published by Chatto & Windus in 1929, and thought to be partly autobiographical.

== Plot summary ==
Death of a Hero is the story of a young English artist named George Winterbourne who enlists in the army at the beginning of the Great War. The book is narrated by an unnamed first-person narrator who claims to have known and served with the main character. It is divided into three parts.

=== Book I ===
The first part details George's family history. His father, a middle-class man from England's countryside, marries a poor woman who falsely believes she is marrying into a monied family. After George's birth, his mother has a series of lovers. The portrait of George's parents is believed to be based on his parents, whom he disliked. One critic called the characters "parodic monsters". George is brought up to be a proper and patriotic member of English society. He is encouraged to learn his father's insurance business, but fails to do so. After a disagreement with his parents, he moves to London to become an artist and live a socialite lifestyle.

=== Book II ===
The second section of the book deals with George's London life. He ingrains himself in socialite society and engages a number of trendy philosophies. After he and his lover, Elizabeth, have a pregnancy scare, they decide to marry. Although they do not have a child, the marriage endures. They decide to leave their marriage open. George takes Elizabeth's close friend as a lover and their marriage begins to fail. Just as the situation is becoming particularly heated, England declares war on Germany. George decides to enlist. Aldington's portrayal of society contains "clumsily satirical portraits" of T. S. Eliot and Ezra Pound, both of whom were friends.

=== Book III ===
George trains for the army and is sent to France. (No particular location in France is mentioned. The town behind the front where George spends much of his time is referred to as M—.) He fights on the front for some time. When he returns home, he finds that he has been so affected by the war that he cannot relate to his friends, including his wife and lover. The casualty rate among officers is particularly high. When a number of officers in George's unit are killed, he is promoted. Upon spending time with the other officers, he finds them to be cynical and utilitarian. He loses faith in the war quickly. The story ends with George standing up during a machine-gun barrage. He is killed. At the end of the book there is a poem written from the point of view of a veteran comparing the First World War to the Trojan War.

== Censorship ==
Aldington, a veteran of the Great War, claimed that his novel was accurate in terms of speech and style. It contained extensive colloquial speech, including profanity, discussion of sexuality and graphic descriptions of the war and of trench life. There was extensive censorship in England and many war novels had been banned or burned. When Aldington first published his novel, he redacted a number of passages to ensure the publication of his book would not be challenged. He said:

To my astonishment, my publisher informed me that certain words, phrases, sentences, and even passages, are at present taboo in England. I have recorded nothing which I have not observed in human life, said nothing I do not believe to be true.... At my request the publishers are removing what they believe would be considered objectionable, and are placing asterisks to show where omissions have been made.... In my opinion it is better for the book to appear mutilated than for me to say what I don't believe.
