= Padmanoor =

- village
- Location in Karnataka, India Padmanoor (India)
- Coordinates: 13.06°N 74.835°E
- Country: India
- State: Karnataka
- District: Dakshina Kannada

Government
  - Body: Gram panchayat

Languages
  - Official: Kannada
- Time zone: UTC+5:30 (IST)
- PIN: 574 150
- ISO 3166 code: IN-KA
- Vehicle registration: KA-19

Padmanoor is a place in Kinnigoli. It is about 1.5 km from Kinnigoli bus-stand and 3 km from S.Kodi, 7 km from Mulki.
