= Orioli =

Orioli is a surname. Notable people with the surname include:

- Antonio Francesco Orioli (1778–1852), Italian cardinal of the Catholic Church
- Edi Orioli (born 1962), Italian rallying motorcycle racer
- Francesco Orioli (1783-1856), Italian patriot, politician, and polymath writer
- Giuseppe Orioli (1884–1942), Italian book publisher
- Pietro di Francesco degli Orioli (approx. 1458–1496), Italian painter of the Renaissance period
- Regina Orioli (born 1977), Italian actress
