= Brigit Patmore =

English author and society hostess (1888–1965)

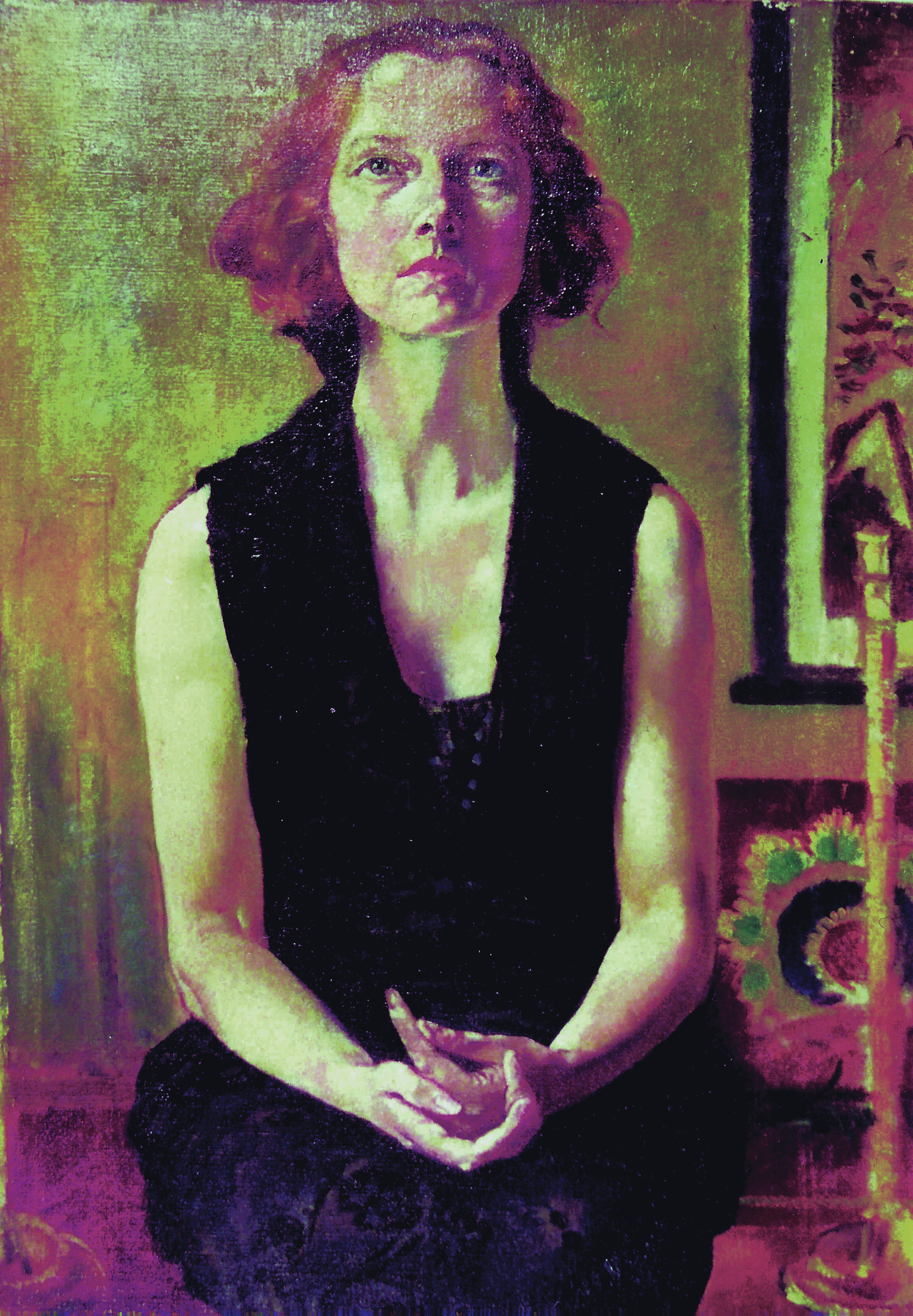
Patmore in a 1923 portrait by Clara Klinghoffer

Brigit Patmore (née Ethel Elizabeth Morrison-Scott; 1888–1965) was an English author and London society hostess.

== Life ==
Born in 1888, her mother's family landowners in Ulster, Ethel Elizabeth Morrison-Scott married John Deighton Patmore, a successful insurance executive, the grandson of Victorian poet Coventry Patmore. They lived in a large house near Holland Park; their marriage was long but not close or confidential. Through the family's literary connections and through her friendship with novelist and suffragist Violet Hunt, she had built a solid reputation as an influential literary hostess by the end of 1911. Biographers describe her as "an indefatigable sponsor of unknown talent".

Patmore's son Derek describes her as a beautiful, slightly melancholy young woman who craved attention and affection. Hunt wrote, "She was very beautiful with a queer, large, tortured mouth that said the wittiest things, eyes that tore your soul out of your body for pity and yet danced".

Hunt introduced Patmore to such writers as Ezra Pound (1909), Ford Madox Ford, W. B. Yeats, and H. G. Wells. In 1911, at 23, bored, distressed and dissatisfied with her husband's open philandering, she had a brief affair with the young poet Richard Aldington, age 18. Patmore introduced her lover to Pound and between them the new Imagist poetry movement was born. Patmore, Pound and Aldington became inseparable, the heart of their bed-swapping London literary circle. She remained good friends with Pound until her death in 1965.

Patmore went on to introduce Aldington to the new American émigré poet H.D. and the two soon became lovers, later marrying. The three remained close, with Patmore writing, "We three were bound together, but lightly, gaily. We liked being together. We laughed and read, walked about London, looked at pictures, had meals in tea-rooms." Following the breakup of Aldington and H.D.'s marriage, Patmore and he had a ten-year relationship, living together and travelling across Europe. He was in recovery from his time serving in the First World War, writing his best-known works, and she wrote This Impassioned Onlooker (1926) and No Tomorrow (1929).

D. H. Lawrence "presented a friendly vignette of her as Clariss Browning in his novel Aaron's Rod." Patmore wrote "A Memoir of Frieda Lawrence," published in A D. H. Lawrence Miscellany.

== Works ==
- This Impassioned Onlooker (1926). Short stories
- No Tomorrow (1929). Novel
- My friends when young: the memoirs of Brigit Patmore, Heinemann, 1968

== Further resources ==
- Archival material at Yale
- Patmore literary archive at Harry Ransom Center, University of Texas
