= Derek Patmore =

English writer

Derek Coventry Patmore (1908, London – 1972) was a British writer. He was the great-grandson of the poet Coventry Patmore and the son of the writer Brigit Patmore.

Patmore was educated at Uppingham School. He worked as a war correspondent in the Balkans and the Middle East, writing for the News Chronicle and the Daily Mail.

In 1940, having met Patmore in Bucharest, the Romanian writer Mihail Sebastian wrote in his diary that Camil Petrescu told him Patmore was a pederast.

== Works ==
- Selected Poems of Coventry Patmore, London: Chatto and Windus, 1931.
- Portrait of My Family, London: Cassell, 1935.
- I Decorate My Home, London: Putnam, 1936.
- Decoration for the Small Home, London: Putnam, 1938.
- Invitation to Roumania, London: Macmillan, 1939.
- French for Love, London, 1940.
- Balkan Correspondent, New York: Harper, 1941.
- Images of Greece, London: Country Life, 1944.
- Colour Schemes and Modern Furnishing, London: The Studio, 1945.
- Life and Times of Coventry Patmore, Oxford University Press, 1949.
- Italian Pageant, London: Evans Bros, 1949.
- A Traveller in Venice, London: Methuen, 1951.
- A Decorator's Notebook, London: Falcon Press, 1952.
- Dark Places of the Heart: A Novel, London: Falcon Press, 1953.
- Private History: An Autobiography, 1960.
- Canada, London: Studio Vista, 1967.
- D. H. Lawrence and the Dominant Male, London: Covent Garden Press, 1970.
- Homage to Marcel Proust, London: Covent Garden Press, 1971.

== See also ==
- Bruscello
