= Richard Aldington =

English writer and poet (1892–1962)

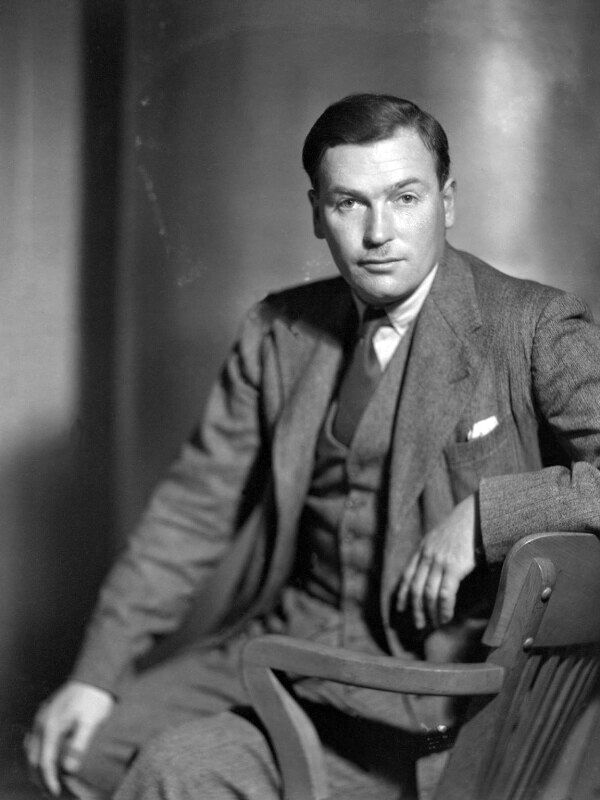
- Born: Edward Godfree Aldington; 8 July 1892; Portsmouth, Hampshire, England
- Died: 27 August 1962 (aged 70); Sury, Ardennes, France
- Education: Dover College; University of London
- Occupations: poet; novelist; biographer
- Spouses: Hilda Doolittle (m. 1913; div. 1938); Netta McCullough
- Children: 1
- Writing career
- Notable work: Death of a Hero
- Movement: Imagism
- Military career
- Allegiance: United Kingdom
- Branch: British Army
- Service years: 1916–1919
- Rank: Temporary Captain
- Units: 11th Leicestershires; Royal Sussex Regiment
- Conflicts: World War I

Richard Aldington (born Edward Godfree Aldington; 8 July 1892 – 27 July 1962) was an English writer and poet. He was an early associate of the Imagist movement. His 50-year writing career produced "143 separate titles, including poetry, literary criticism, fiction, essays, anthologies, biographies, translations, and introductions. In addition, he published reviews of over 1,350 separate books, published hundreds of other articles, and wrote an immense quantity of letters, of which approximately 8,000 have been located since his death." He edited The Egoist, a literary journal, and wrote for The Times Literary Supplement, Vogue, The Criterion, and Poetry. His biography, Wellington (1946), won the James Tait Black Memorial Prize.

Aldington was married to the poet Hilda Doolittle, known by her initials H.D., from 1913 to 1938. His acquaintances included writers T. S. Eliot, D. H. Lawrence, Ezra Pound, W. B. Yeats, Lawrence Durrell, C. P. Snow, and others. He championed H.D. as the major poetic voice of the Imagist movement and helped her work gain international notice.

== Early life and education ==
Edward Godfree (known from an early age as "Richard") Aldington was born in Portsmouth, on 8 July 1892, the eldest of four children of Albert Edward Aldington (1864–1921) and Jessie May (1872–1954), née Godfree. His father failed to establish himself as a solicitor, going into business as a bookseller and stationer on Portsmouth High Street, later a solicitor's clerk and amateur author; his mother was a novelist (as "Mrs A. E. Aldington") and keeper of the Mermaid Inn at Rye. Both his parents wrote and published books, and their home held a large library of European and classical literature. In addition to reading, Aldington's interests at this time, all of which continued in later life, included butterfly collecting, hiking, and learning languages – he went on to master French, Italian, Latin, and ancient Greek. He was educated at Mr. Sweetman's Seminary for Young Gentlemen, St Margaret's Bay, near Dover. His father died of heart problems at age 56.

Aldington attended Dover College, followed by the University of London. He was unable to complete his degree because of the financial circumstances of his family caused by his father's failed speculations and ensuing debt. Supported by a small allowance from his parents, he worked as a sports journalist, started publishing poetry in British journals, and gravitated towards literary circles that included poets William Butler Yeats and Walter de la Mare.

In 1911, Aldington met society hostess Brigit Patmore, with whom he had a passing affair. At the time he was described as "tall and broad-shouldered, with a fine forehead, thick longish hair of the indefinite colour blond hair turns to in adolescence, very bright blue eyes, too small a nose, and a determined mouth." Through her he met American poets Ezra Pound and H.D., who had previously been engaged to each other. Doolittle and Aldington grew closer and in 1913 travelled together extensively through Italy and France, just before the war. On their return to London in the summer they moved into separate flats in Churchwalk, Kensington, in West London. Doolittle lived at No. 6, Aldington at No. 8, and Pound at No. 10. In the presence of Pound and the Doolittle family, over from the United States for the summer, the couple married. They moved to 5 Holland Place Chambers into a flat of their own, although Pound soon moved in across the hall.

The poets were caught up in the literary ferment before the war, where new politics and ideas were passionately discussed and created in Soho tearooms and society salons. The couple bonded over their visions of new forms of poetry, feminism, and philosophy emerging from the wake of staid Victorian mores. The couple felt a sense of peership, rejecting hierarchies and beginning to view Pound as an intruder and interloper rather than a literary igniter.

The couple met American poet Amy Lowell, and she introduced them to D. H. Lawrence in 1914, who would become a close friend and mentor to both.

== Career ==
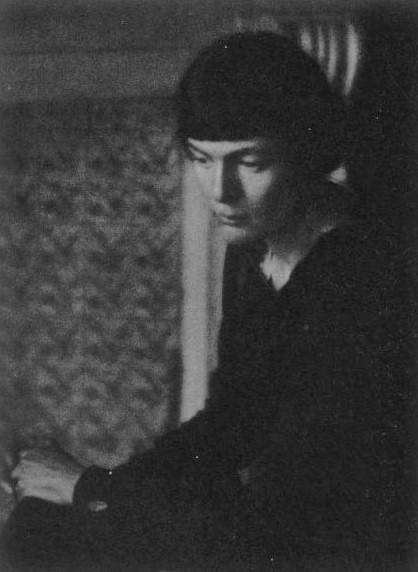
H.D. in 1917

Aldington's poetry was associated with the Imagist group, championing minimalist free verse with stark images, seeking to banish Victorian moralism. The group was key in the emerging Modernist movement. Ezra Pound coined the term imagistes for H.D. and Aldington (1912). Aldington's poetry forms almost one third of the Imagists' inaugural anthology Des Imagistes (1914). The movement was heavily inspired by Japanese and classical European art. Aldington shared T. E. Hulme's conviction that experimentation with traditional Japanese verse forms could provide a way forward for avant-garde literature in English.

Pound sent three of Aldington's poems to Harriet Monroe's magazine Poetry and they appeared in November 1912. She notes "Mr Richard Aldington is a young English poet, one of the "Imagistes", a group of ardent Hellenists who are pursuing interesting experiments in vers libre."She considered the poem "Choricos" to be his finest work, "one of the most beautiful death songs in the language", "a poem of studied and affected gravity".

H.D. became pregnant in August 1914, and in 1915 Aldington and H.D. moved from their home in Holland Park near Ezra Pound to Hampstead close to D. H. Lawrence and Frieda. They felt calmer out of the bustle of the city, with more space and green. The pregnancy ended in a stillborn daughter, which traumatised the couple and put a great strain on the relationship; H.D. was 28 and Aldington 22. The outbreak of war in 1914 deeply disturbed Aldington, though no draft was in place at this time. H.D. felt more distant from the melee, not having a close affinity to the European landscape, geographical or political. This rift also put pressure on the marriage. Unhappy, Aldington dreamed of escape to America and began to have affairs. He began a relationship with Florence Fallas, who had also lost a child.

Between 1914 and 1916 Aldington was literary editor and a columnist at The Egoist. He was assistant editor with Leonard Compton-Rickett under Dora Marsden. Aldington knew Wyndham Lewis well and reviewed his work in The Egoist. He was also an associate of Ford Madox Ford's, helping him with a propaganda volume for a government commission in 1914 and taking dictation for The Good Soldier.

=== World War I and aftermath ===
Aldington joined up in June 1916 and was sent for training at Wareham in Dorset. H.D. moved to be closer to her husband. He was then sent to a camp near Manchester. They found the duality of their lives harsh, and the gruelling, regimented nature of the training felt hard for the sensitive professional poet. He felt fundamentally different from the other men, more given to intellectual pursuits than unending physical labour that left him little time to write. Their sporadic meetings were emotionally wrenching and the couple could make no plans for their future together. He encouraged H.D. to return to America where she could make a safer and more stable home. They both watched news come in of heavy troop losses in France at the Somme and on other battlefields. She could not have information given on her husband's future postings overseas, all held to be secret. Rationing and the forced draft began as the war turned against the British.

When Aldington was sent to the front in December 1916, the couple's relationship became epistolary. He wrote that he had managed to complete 12 poems and three essays since joining up and wanted to work on producing a new book, in order to keep his mind on literature, despite his work of digging graves. He found the soldier's life degrading, living with lice, cold, mud and little sanitation. His encounters with gas on the front would affect him for the rest of his life. He was given leave in July 1917 and the couple enjoyed a reunion during this brief reprieve. He felt distant from old Imagist friends like Pound who had not undergone the torturous life of the soldiers on the front and could not imagine the living conditions.

In November 1917, Aldington joined up in the 11th Leicestershires and was later commissioned as a second lieutenant in the Royal Sussex Regiment. He finished the war as a signals officer and temporary captain, being demobilised in February 1919. He likely never fully recovered from the trauma of World War I, writing of his field experiences in the collections Images of War and Images of Desire (1919), which were suffused with a new melancholy. By the end of World War I, he was feeling disconsolate about his own talent as a poet. Exile and Other Poems (1923) also dealt with the process of trauma. A collection of war stories Roads to Glory, appeared in 1930. After this point he became known as a critic and biographer.

Towards the end of the war, H.D. lived with composer Cecil Gray, a friend of D. H. Lawrence's. They had a daughter together in March 1919, the pregnancy much complicated by H.D.'s catching pneumonia towards the end. Neither Gray nor Aldington wanted to accept paternity. By the time of Aldington's return H.D. was involved with the female writer Bryher. H.D. and Aldington formally separated and had relationships with other people, but they did not divorce until 1938. They remained friends for the rest of their lives. He destroyed all the couple's pre-1918 correspondence.

Aldington helped T. S. Eliot by persuading Harriet Shaw Weaver to appoint Eliot as Aldington's successor at The Egoist magazine. In 1919, he introduced Eliot to the editor Bruce Richmond of The Times Literary Supplement. Aldington was on the editorial board of Chaman Lall's London literary quarterly Coterie (published 1919–1921), accompanied by Conrad Aiken, Eliot, Lewis and Aldous Huxley. Eliot had a job in the international department of Lloyds Bank and well-meaning friends wanted him full-time writing poetry. Ezra Pound, plotting a scheme to "get Eliot out of the bank", was supported by Lady Ottoline Morrell, Leonard Woolf and Harry Norton Aldington began publishing in journals such as the Imagist The Chapbook. In reply to Eliot's The Waste Land, Aldington wrote A Fool i' the Forest: A Phantasmagoria (1924).

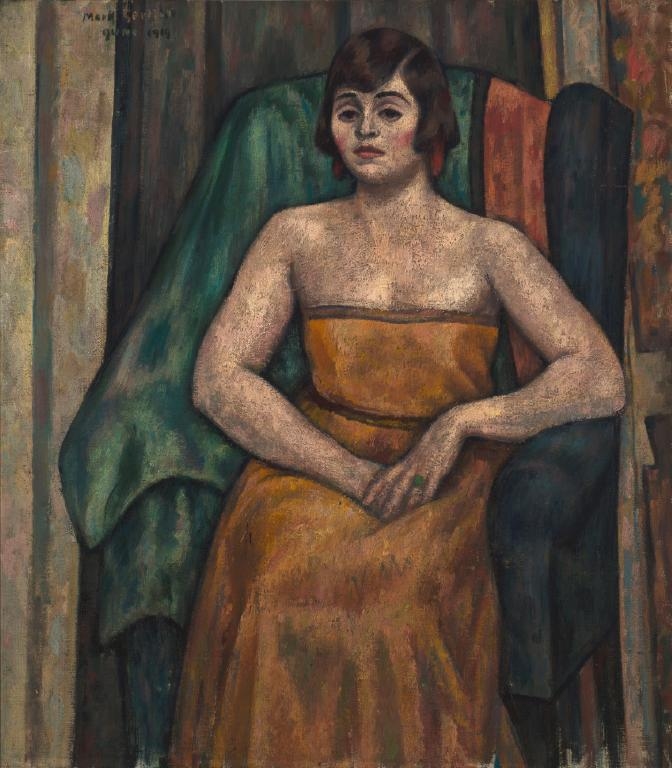
Valentine Dobrée 1919

Aldington suffered a breakdown in 1925. His interest in poetry waned, and he developed an animosity towards Eliot's celebrity. Aldington grew closer to Eliot but gradually became a supporter of Vivienne Eliot in the troubled marriage. Aldington satirised her husband as "Jeremy Cibber" in Stepping Heavenward (1931). He had a relationship with writer Valentine Dobrée and a lengthy and passionate affair with Arabella Yorke, a lover since Mecklenburgh Square days, coming to an end when he went abroad.

Aldington helped Irene Rathbone publish her semi-autobiographical novel We That Were Young in 1932. They had an affair that ended in 1937. Rathbone dedicated her 1936 novel They Call it Peace to him, and she wrote a long poem, Was There a Summer?: A Narrative Poem, in 1943 about their relationship.

=== Exile ===
Aldington went into self-imposed exile in 1928. He lived in Paris for years, living with Brigit Patmore and fascinated by Nancy Cunard, whom he met in 1928. Following his divorce in 1938 he married Netta Patmore, née McCullough, previously Brigit's daughter-in-law. In 1938, Richard and Netta had a daughter Catherine; in 1950, Netta left him to raise Catherine by himself.

Death of a Hero (1929), which Aldington called a "jazz novel," was his semi-autobiographical response to the war. He started writing it almost immediately after the armistice was declared. The novel condemned Victorian materialism as a cause of the tragedy and waste of the war. Rejectionist, an "Expressionist scream", it was commended by Lawrence Durrell as "the best war novel of the epoch". It was developed mostly while Aldington was living on the island of Port-Cros in Provence, building on the manuscript from a decade before. Opening with a letter to the playwright Halcott Glover, the book takes a satirical, cynical, and critical stance on Victorian and Edwardian cant. Published in September 1929, by Christmas it had sold more than 10,000 copies in England alone, part of a wave of war remembrances from writers such as Remarque, Sassoon, and Hemingway. The book was quickly translated into German and other European languages. In Russia the book was taken to be a wholesale attack on bourgeois politics, "the inevitable result of the life which had preceded it", as Aldington wrote. "The next one will be much worse". It was praised by Gorky as revolutionary, and the book, along with Aldington's later fiction, received huge Russian distribution. Aldington was, however, fiercely non-partisan in his politics, despite his passion for iconoclasm and feminism.

The character of George Winterbourne is loosely based on Aldington as an artist (Winterbourne a painter rather than writer), having a mistress before and through the war, and the novel portrays locations strongly resembling those he had travelled to. One of these locations, fictionally named "The Chateau de Fressin," strongly resembled a castle he wrote about in a letter to H.D.

Death of a Hero, like many other novels published around this time about the war, suffered greatly from censorship. Instead of changing or cutting parts of his novel, he replaced objectionable words with asterisks. Although they looked awkward on the page, Aldington, among others, wanted to call attention to censoring by publishers.

In 1930 Aldington published a translation of The Decameron and then the romance All Men are Enemies (1933). In 1942, having relocated to the United States with his new wife Netta, he began to write biographies, starting with Wellington: The Duke: Being an Account of the Life & Achievements of Arthur Wellesley, 1st Duke of Wellington (1943). It was followed by works on D. H. Lawrence: Portrait of a Genius, But ... (1950), Robert Louis Stevenson: Portrait of a Rebel (1957), and T. E. Lawrence: Lawrence of Arabia: A Biographical Inquiry (1955). Under financial pressure, he also worked as a Hollywood screenwriter.

Aldington's excoriating biography of T. E. Lawrence caused a scandal on its publication in 1955. In the spirit of iconoclasm, he was the first to bring public notice to Lawrence's illegitimacy and asserted that he was a homosexual, a liar, a charlatan, an "impudent mythomaniac", a "self-important egotist", a poor writer and even a bad motorcyclist. The biography dramatically coloured popular opinion of Lawrence. Foreign and War Office files concerning Lawrence's career were released during the 1960s and further biographies continued to analyse the 'British hero'. Robert Graves, a friend of Lawrence, wrote that "instead of a carefully considered portrait of Lawrence, I find the self-portrait of a bitter, bedridden, leering, asthmatic, elderly hangman-of-letters." Robert Irwin, in the London Review of Books, speculated that Aldington's spite was driven by jealousy and a sense of exclusion by the British establishment. Lawrence had attended Oxford and his father was a baronet; Aldington had suffered in the bloodbath of Europe during the First World War while Lawrence had gained a heroic reputation in the Middle Eastern theatre and became an international celebrity and homosexual icon. Irwin observes that Aldington "was industrious and his portrait of Lawrence was fuelled by careful research". Christopher Sykes, in his 1969 introduction to the Collins edition (reprinted in Pelican Biographies in 1971), stated that "for the first time, the awkward questions were faced squarely"; Sykes's final assessment of Aldington's book is that it "cleared the ground of rubbish, efficiently and thoroughly".

In 1947 Aldington met the Australian writer Alister Kershaw in Paris. Kershaw became Aldington's secretary and moved in with Aldington and his wife Netta at their house at Saint Clair Le Lavandou in the south of France.

Aldington lived in Sury-en-Vaux, Cher, France, from 1958. His last significant book was a biography of the Provençal poet and winner of the Nobel Prize in Literature, Frédéric Mistral (1956).

== Death ==
Aldington died of a heart attack in Sury-en-Vaux on 27 July 1962, shortly after being honoured in Moscow on the occasion of his 70th birthday and the translation of some of his novels into Russian. He was honoured in the Soviet Union, "even if some of the fêting was probably because he had, in his writings, sometimes suggested that the England he loved could, in certain of its aspects, be less than an earthly paradise."

Aldington is buried in the cemetery in Sury-en-Vaux. He was survived by a daughter, Catherine, the child of his second marriage, who died in 2010.

== Legacy ==
On 11 November 1985 Aldington was among 16 Great War poets commemorated in stone at Westminster Abbey's Poet's Corner. The inscription on the stone was taken from Wilfred Owen's "Preface" to his poems and reads: "My subject is War, and the pity of War. The Poetry is in the pity."

== Style and bitterness ==
Alec Waugh described Aldington as having been embittered by the war, but took it that he worked off his spleen in novels like The Colonel's Daughter (1931) rather than letting it poison his life. Douglas Bush describes his work as "a career of disillusioned bitterness." His novels contained thinly veiled portraits of some of his friends, including Eliot, Lawrence and Pound; the friendship not always surviving. Lyndall Gordon characterises the sketch of Eliot in Aldington's memoirs Life for Life's Sake (1941) as "snide." As a young man, he was cutting about Yeats, but they remained on good terms.

Aldington's obituary in The Times of London in 1962 described him as "[a]n angry young man of the generation before they became fashionable ... who remained something of an angry old man to the end".

== Works ==
- Images (1910–1915) (The Poetry Bookshop, London, 1915) & (historical reproduction by Bibliobazaar ISBN 978-1-113-27518-9) 2009
- Images Old and New (Four Seas Co., Boston, 1916) & (historical reproduction by Bibliobazaar ISBN 978-1-113-39283-1) 2009
- The Poems of Anyte of Tegea (1916) translator
- The Little Demon, by Feodor Sologub, authorised translation by John Cournos and Richard Aldington (London: Martin Secker, 1916).
- Images of Desire (Elkin Mathews, 1919) & (historical reproduction by Bibliobazaar) ISBN 978-1-115-45071-3) 2009
- Images of War, A Book of Poems (Beaumont Press, London, 1919) & (historical reproduction by Bibliobazaar) ISBN 978-1-171-58428-5) 2009
- War and Love: Poems 1915–1918 (1919)
- Greek Songs in the Manner of Anacreon (1919) translator
- Hymen (Egoist Press, 1921) with H.D.
- Medallions in Clay (1921)
- The Good-Humoured Ladies: A Comedy by Carlo Goldoni (1922) translator, with Arthur Symons
- Exile and Other Poems (1923)
- Literary Studies and Reviews (1924) essays
- Sturly, by Pierre Custot (1924) translator
- The Mystery of the Nativity: Translated from the Liegeois of the XVth Century (Medici Society, 1924) translator
- A Fool i' the Forest: A Phantasmagoria (1924) poem
- A Book of 'Characters' from Theophrastus; Joseph Hall, Sir Thomas Overbury, Nicolas Breton, John Earle, Thomas Fuller, and Other English Authors; Jean de La Bruyère, Vauvenargues, and Other French Authors: Compiled and Translated by Richard Aldington, With an Introduction and Notes (1924)
- Voltaire (1925)
- French Studies and Reviews (1926)
- The Love of Myrrhine and Konallis: and other prose poems (1926)
- Cyrano De Bergerac, Voyages to the Moon and the Sun (1927) translator
- D. H. Lawrence: An Indiscretion (1927) (34-page pamphlet)
- Letters of Madame de Sévigné to Her Daughter and Her Friends, selected, with an introductory essay, by Richard Aldington (1927) translator
- Letters of Voltaire and Frederick the Great (1927) translator
- Candide and Other Romances by Voltaire (1928) translator with Norman Tealby
- Collected Poems (1928)
- Fifty Romance Lyric Poems (1928) translator
- Hark the Herald (Hours Press, 1928)
- Remy de Gourmont: Selections From All His Works Chosen and Translated by Richard Aldington (1928)
- Remy de Gourmont: A Modern Man of Letters (1928)
- The Treason of the Intellectuals (La Trahison des Clercs), by Julien Benda (1928) translator
- Death of a Hero: A Novel (1929)
- The Eaten Heart (Hours Press, 1929) poems
- A Dream in the Luxembourg: A Poem (1930)
- Euripides' Alcestis (1930) translator
- At All Costs (William Heinemann, Ltd., 1930) 45-page story
- D. H. Lawrence (1930) (43-page pamphlet; its contents are identical to D. H. Lawrence: An Indiscretion (1927), except for the dropping of the subtitle and the addition of a one-paragraph note following the title page.)
- Last Straws (Hours Press, 1930)
- Medallions from Anyte of Tegea, Meleager of Gadara, the Anacreontea, Latin Poets of the Renaissance (1930) translator
- The Memoirs of Marmontel (1930) editor, with Brigit Patmore
- Roads to Glory (1930) stories
- The Decameron of Giovanni Boccaccio; translated by Richard Aldington; illustrations by Jean de Bosschère (1930)
- Two Stories (Elkin Mathews, 1930): "Deserter" and "The Lads of the Village"
- Letters to the Amazon, by Remy de Gourmont (1931) translator
- Balls and Another Book for Suppression (1931) (13 pages)
- The Colonel's Daughter: A Novel (1931)
- Stepping Heavenward: A Record (1931) satire aimed at T. S. Eliot
- Aurelia by Gérard de Nerval (1932) translator
- Soft Answers (1932) five short novels
- All Men Are Enemies: A Romance (1933)
- Last Poems of D. H. Lawrence (1933) edited with Giuseppe Orioli
- The Poems of Richard Aldington (1934) review
- Women Must Work: A Novel (1934)
- Artifex: Sketches and Ideas (1935) essays
- D. H. Lawrence: A complete list of his works, together with a critical appreciation by Richard Aldington (1935) (22-page pamphlet)
- The Spirit of Place (1935), editor, D. H. Lawrence prose anthology
- Life Quest (1935) poem
- Life of a Lady: A Play in Three Acts (1936) with Derek Patmore
- The Crystal World (1937)
- Very Heaven (1937)
- Seven Against Reeves: A Comedy-Farce (1938) novel
- Rejected Guest (1939) novel
- W. Somerset Maugham: An Appreciation (1939)
- Life for Life's Sake: A Book of Reminiscences (1941)
- Poetry of the English-Speaking World (1941) anthology, editor
- The Duke: Being an account of the life & achievements of Arthur Wellesley, 1st Duke of Wellington (1943). Later edition: Wellington: Being an account of the life & achievements of Arthur Wellesley, 1st Duke of Wellington (1946).
- A Wreath for San Gemignano (1945) with illustrations by Netta Aldington and sonnets of Folgóre da San Gimignano titled The Garland of Months and translated by Richard Aldington
- Great French Romances (1946) novels by Madame de La Fayette, Choderlos De Laclos, Abbé Prévost, Honoré de Balzac
- Oscar Wilde: Selected Works, with Twelve Unpublished Letters (1946) editor
- "Introduction" to The Portable Oscar Wilde (1946) Selected and edited by Richard Aldington
- The Romance of Casanova: A Novel (1946)
- Complete Poems (1948)
- Four English Portraits, 1801–1851 (1948) (The four are the Prince Regent, the young Disraeli, Charles "Squire" Waterton, and the young Dickens.)
- Selected Works of Walter Pater (1948)
- Jane Austen (1948)
- The Decameron of Giovanni Bocaccio; translated by Richard Aldington; illustrated by Rockwell Kent (two volumes) (1949)
- The Strange Life of Charles Waterton, 1782–1865 (1949)
- A Bibliography of the Works of Richard Aldington from 1915 to 1948 (1950) with Alister Kershaw
- Selected Letters of D. H. Lawrence (1950) editor
- The Indispensable Oscar Wilde (1950) editor
- Portrait of a Genius, But ... (The Life of D. H. Lawrence, 1885–1930) (1950)
- D. H. Lawrence: An Appreciation (1950) (32-page pamphlet, which borrows from the 1927, 1930, and 1935 pamphlets on Lawrence listed above)
- The Religion of Beauty: Selections from the Aesthetes (1950) anthology, editor
- Ezra Pound and T. S. Eliot: A Lecture (Peacocks Press, 1954) (22 pages)
- Lawrence L'imposteur: T. E. Lawrence, the Legend and the Man (1954) Paris edition; also published as Lawrence of Arabia: A Biographical Enquiry (1955)
- Pinorman: Personal Recollections of Norman Douglas, Pino Orioli and Charles Prentice (1954) (Charles Prentice (1891-1949) was a publisher)
- A. E. Housman and W. B. Yeats: Two Lectures (Hurst Press, 1955)
- Introduction to Mistral (1956) (biography of French poet Frédéric Mistral)
- Frauds (1957)
- Portrait of a Rebel: The Life and Work of Robert Louis Stevenson (1957)
- The Viking Book of Poetry of the English-Speaking World, Volume II (1958) editor
- "The Composite Biography as Biography," in Moore, Harry T., ed., A D. H. Lawrence Miscellany, Southern Illinois University Press (1959) and William Heinemann Ltd (1961), pp. 143–152. "[This] essay serves as the Introduction of Vol. 3 of Edward Nehls's D. H. Lawrence: A Composite Biography, copyright, 1959, by the University of Wisconsin Press." p. 143 n.
- Larousse Encyclopedia of Mythology (1960) translator with Delano Ames
- Switzerland (1960)
- Famous Cities of the World: Rome (1960)
- A Tourist's Rome (1961)
- Richard Aldington: Selected Critical Writing, 1928–1960 (1970) edited by Alister Kershaw. Contains chapters on ten writers: Remy de Gourmont, Aldous Huxley, Wyndham Lewis, Somerset Maugham, Oscar Wilde, Walter Pater, Jane Austen, Roy Campbell, Lawrence Durrell, and D. H. Lawrence.
- A Passionate Prodigality: Letters to Alan Bird from Richard Aldington, 1949–1962 (1975) edited by Miriam J. Benkovitz
- Literary Lifelines: The Richard Aldington and Lawrence Durrell Correspondence (1981)
- In Winter: A Poem (Typographeum Press, 1987)
- Austria/L'Autriche/Österreich: A Book of Photographs, with an introduction by Richard Aldington. London: Anglo-Italian Publication (1958)
- Italy/L'Italie/Italien: A Book of Photographs, with an introduction by Richard Aldington. London: Anglo-Italian Publications (1958)
- France/La France/Frankreich: A Book of Photographs, with an introduction by Richard Aldington. London: Anglo-Italian Publications (1961)
