= Life for Life's Sake =

1941 memoir by Richard Aldington

- First edition
- Author: Richard Aldington
- Language: English
- Genre: Memoir
- Publisher: Viking Press
- Publication date: 1941
- Publication place: United Kingdom

Life For Life's Sake: A Book of Reminiscences is a book of memoirs written by Richard Aldington and published by the Viking Press in 1941.

The book covers the pre-First World War period, the 1920s, and the 1930s, with a single chapter covering the First World War, which Aldington had already written of in poetry and his novel Death of a Hero. The title reflects his credo of hedonism. The book includes details of his involvement in Imagism and reminiscences of many writers and artists, including Amy Lowell, Ezra Pound, H.D., T.S. Eliot, D.H. Lawrence, Ford Madox Ford, and James Joyce.
