= Those Barren Leaves =

1925 satirical novel by English writer Aldous Huxley

First edition (publ. Chatto & Windus)

Those Barren Leaves is a satirical novel by Aldous Huxley, published in 1925. The title is derived from the poem "The Tables Turned" by William Wordsworth which ends with the words:

Enough of Science and of Art;
Close up those barren leaves;
Come forth, and bring with you a heart
That watches and receives.

It is the story of Mrs. Aldwinkle and her entourage, members of a cultural elite who are gathered in an Italian palace to relive the glories of the Renaissance.

The work entered the public domain in the United States in 2021, but remains under copyright until 2034 in countries that follow the 70-year post-mortem rule.
