= Clara Klinghoffer =

British artist (1900–1970)

- Born: Chaje Esther Klinghoffer; 18 May 1900; Szczerzec, Austria-Hungary
- Died: 18 November 1970 (aged 70); London, England
- Education: John Cass Institute; Central School of Arts and Crafts; Slade School of Fine Art
- Known for: Painting, drawing
- Spouse: Joseph W. F. Stoppelman (m. 1926)

Clara Esther Klinghoffer (18 May 1900 – 18 November 1970) was a British painter and draughtswoman. Born in Austria-Hungary to a Polish-Jewish family and raised in England, she won early acclaim as a student, when critics likened her drawing to that of Raphael and Leonardo da Vinci. She worked chiefly as a portraitist and figure painter, and her sitters included Winston Churchill, Vivien Leigh and Isaac Bashevis Singer.

Klinghoffer exhibited widely in London and, later, in the United States, where she settled and declined to adopt abstract expressionism. Her work is held by public collections including the Tate, the National Portrait Gallery, the Victoria and Albert Museum and the Ben Uri gallery.

== Early life and training ==
Klinghoffer was born Chaje Esther Klinghoffer on 18 May 1900 in Szczerzec (now Shchyrets), a village near Lemberg (now Lviv) in the Austro-Hungarian province of Galicia, to Hannah and Solomon Klinghoffer, a Polish-Jewish family. Her father moved to England to work as a tailor in Manchester, and Clara followed with her mother in 1903; the family settled in London's East End in 1904.

She drew from an early age and took classes at the John Cass Institute in Aldgate in 1914 before entering the Central School of Arts and Crafts, where she studied under Duncan Grant and Bernard Meninsky from 1915 to 1918. Meninsky's declaration that "that child draws like da Vinci" helped establish her early reputation. She won a bursary to the Slade School of Fine Art, where she studied under Henry Tonks from 1918 to 1920.

== Career ==
While still a student, Klinghoffer held her first exhibition, at the Hampstead Art Gallery in 1920, on the recommendation of Alfred Wolmark; the sculptor Jacob Epstein and Meninsky were also early supporters. Solo exhibitions at London galleries followed, including the Leicester Galleries (1923 and 1932), the Redfern Gallery (1926, 1929 and 1938) and the Godfrey Phillips Galleries (1929). She also exhibited with the Goupil Gallery salons, the New English Art Club, the London Group, the Royal Academy and the Carnegie International. Her drawings of women and children, several based on her six sisters, were frequently compared to Raphael.

On 29 July 1926 Klinghoffer married the Dutch journalist and author Joseph Willem Ferdinand Stoppelman at the Great Synagogue of London. The couple had a daughter, Sonia, and moved to the Netherlands in 1929, where a son, Michael, was born; Klinghoffer lived in the Netherlands and France from 1930 to 1939.

In 1939, with the German invasion of the Netherlands imminent, the family returned briefly to London before emigrating to the United States. Furniture and works left in storage in a Haarlem warehouse were later seized by the occupying German forces. Klinghoffer spent the Second World War in the United States and, from 1945, divided her time between studios in London and New York. Although she continued to exhibit in the United States, she declined to take up abstract expressionism, then dominant in America, and felt her work overshadowed by what she called the "splatter and drip" approach. Her last solo exhibition was held in Mexico City in 1969.

== Critical reception ==
Klinghoffer's student work brought early acclaim, and reviewers repeatedly compared her drawing to that of the Old Masters; the Daily Graphic headlined one notice "Girl Who Draws Like Raphael". Epstein called her "a painter of the first order" whose understanding of form placed her "in the very first rank of draughtsmen in the world", and the art historian Mary Chamot compared her drawings to those of "the great Italian Masters".

After she settled in the United States, Klinghoffer's prominence declined as taste shifted toward abstraction. Reviewing an exhibition in The Daily Telegraph in 1981, the critic Terence Mullaly wrote that she had been "unjustly forgotten", describing her as "a portrait painter of sensitive talent and, above all, a fine draughtsman" whose eclipse was "lamentable".

== Death ==
Klinghoffer died in London on 18 November 1970, aged 70.
