= Unspeakable: A Life beyond Sexual Morality =

Book published in 2020

- Author: Rachel Hope Cleves
- Genre: Non-fiction
- Publisher: University of Chicago Press
- Publication date: 2020
- ISBN: 978-0226733531

Unspeakable: A Life beyond Sexual Morality is a 2020 biography of British writer Norman Douglas (1868-1952) written by American historian Rachel Hope Cleves. It focuses on Douglas's pedophilia, stating, "In 1923, when he was fifty-four years old, the writer Norman Douglas boasted that he'd had sex with eleven hundred virgins", both boys and girls. "By present standards he was a monster. During his lifetime he was considered a great man," even though "[e]veryone" "knew about his sexual life.... He was a central figure in literary circles all the same". Unspeakable examines the change in attitudes toward pedophilia.
