= Giuseppe Orioli (bookseller) =

Florentine bookseller and author

Guiseppe Orioli
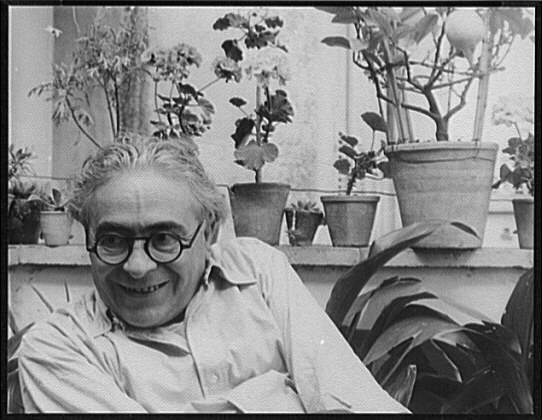
- Orioli in 1935
- Born: 1884; Alfonsine, Italy
- Died: 1942 (aged 57–58); Lisbon, Portugal
- Other name: Pino Orioli
- Occupation: Bookseller

Giuseppe "Pino" Orioli (1884–1942) was a Florentine bookseller best known for privately publishing the unexpurgated first edition of Lady Chatterley's Lover and for his long association with Norman Douglas.

Giuseppe Orioli, the son of a sausage maker, was born in Alfonsine in the region of Emilia-Romagna. He "apprenticed to a barber at age twelve. After his mandatory military service, Orioli traveled to London, where he got a job teaching Italian at a language school. There Orioli met Irving Davis, a Cambridge student.... Davis and Orioli became lovers and moved together to Florence, opening a bookshop in 1910. In 1913 Orioli and Davis opened another bookshop in London, which specialized in rare and antique books.... After the war, Orioli returned to Florence and opened his own antiquarian bookshop".

Orioli's relationship with Norman Douglas began in Florence after Douglas settled there in 1921. Orioli undertook the private publication of many of Douglas's subsequent writings. Some of those and some previously unpublished works by other English authors, including Richard Aldington, D. H. Lawrence, and W. Somerset Maugham, were published in Orioli's Lungarno book series.

D. H. Lawrence had sought to have Lady Chatterley's Lover published conventionally by his publishers in England and the United States, but they were reluctant to publish it because of its explicit sexual content. To circumvent censorship, Norman Douglas urged Lawrence to have the book published privately in Florence and is believed to have introduced him to Orioli. In March 1928, Orioli and Lawrence took Lawrence's unexpurgated typescript to a Florence printing shop where type was set by hand by Italian workers who did not know any English, resulting in numerous errors in the typesetting. After several delays, including the time required for extensive proofreading by Lawrence, about 1000 copies of the novel were released in July 1928.

Orioli and Douglas traveled extensively together and were so close that they were known to their friends by the name "Pinorman", a portmanteau word combining Orioli's nickname "Pino" with Douglas's given name of "Norman". Douglas biographer Rachel Hope Cleves writes, "There is no evidence that they were lovers, but they behaved like a married couple." The "primary inspiration" for their travels, Cleves adds, was "to pursue sexual encounters with boys and the older male youth whom Orioli preferred". Richard Aldington, who knew Orioli, wrote that Orioli "had an instinctive and unconquerable physical aversion from women".

In 1952, Douglas published Venus in the Kitchen, a collection of aphrodisiac recipes, under the pseudonym Pilaff Bey; it had originated with Orioli's proposal to translate an Italian cookbook. Orioli himself wrote two books, Adventures of a Bookseller and Moving Along: Just a Diary. In his book Pinorman, Richard Aldington writes, "Pino did know English well and spoke it fluently, though with certain mistakes which gave it a peculiar flavour. And he was perfectly capable of writing those books himself, except that verbal correction would have been needed". Aldington then adds that Norman Douglas, rather than making corrections to the two books, "rewrote Pino's books, and spoiled them, by taking out the special quality which was Pino and substituting his own much less amusing mannerisms".

In his 1937 novel Seven against Reeves: A Comedy-Farce, Richard Aldington "included a portrait of Pino Orioli under the name of 'Erasto Paederini.' The humor was not exactly subtle."

Orioli died in 1942 in Lisbon, where he is buried.
