= Rachel Hope Cleves =

American-Canadian historian

- Born: 1975 (age 50–51); New York City
- Occupation: Historian
- Writing career
- Period: 2010s–Present
- Notable works: Charity and Sylvia: A Same-Sex Marriage in Early America

Rachel Hope Cleves (born 1975) is an American-Canadian historian, best known for her 2014 book Charity and Sylvia: A Same-Sex Marriage in Early America. The book, a study of historical documents concerning the same-sex relationship of Charity Bryant and Sylvia Drake in the 19th century, was a shortlisted Lambda Literary Award nominee for LGBT Studies at the 27th Lambda Literary Awards.

== Career ==
Born in New York City in 1975, Cleves studied at Columbia University and the University of California, Berkeley, and has been a professor at the University of Victoria in Victoria, British Columbia, since 2009. She is a specialist in early American history, with research areas including gender and sexuality, the American relationship with the French Revolution, and the War of 1812. In Unspeakable: A Life beyond Sexual Morality, which is a biography of Norman Douglas that focuses on his pederasty and how attitudes toward it changed, she refers to herself as "a historian of sexuality". Cleves also published an article on the subject.

She has published four books, as well as articles in journals such as Early American Studies, Reviews in American History and the Journal of American History.

In 2019, she was elected a Fellow of the Royal Society of Canada.

=== Charity and Sylvia graphic novel dispute ===
On June 29, 2026, Cleves stated that while she appreciated Tillie Walden's graphic novel about the story of Sylvia Drake and Charity Bryant, Walden had not adequately acknowledged that the graphic novel was based upon her book with a similar name, and had adapted it "without credit or compensation" and claimed Cleves' research "for her own". She said she was disappointed that Walden's media appearances will make her book "harder for readers to find, not easier, and diminish its ... enormously positive impact." She later told ComicsBeat that she wanted Walden's publisher, Drawn & Quarterly, to give her the option for the adaptation and to "co-credit her, with appropriate compensation."

In a statement on July 2, Drawn & Quarterly defended Walden and her research, and noted that Walden had cited Cleves. Cleves responded that the graphic novel was an uncredited adaptation for which Walden and D&W should acknowledge, with appropriate compensation, rather than "profiting off eight years" of her labor. On July 20th, it was reported that historian Ellery Foutch and Coco Moseley of Henry Sheldon Museum, and the museum itself, supported Walden, as did the Vermont Humanities executive director, Christopher Kaufman Ilstrup. Foutch stated that she was surprised at Cleves' claims, described the two books as different, while Moseley stated that "historical understanding is cumulative. It rarely begins with a single researcher or ends with a single book." In contrast, author Alison Bechdel expressed sympathy for Cleves, telling Seven Days Vermont that Cleves was correct in saying that Walden's book would "supersede" her book, adding that the controversy was "as much a commentary on our postliterate era as anything else."

== Books ==
- Rachel Hope Cleves (2009). The Reign of Terror in America: Visions of Violence from Anti-Jacobinism to Antislavery. Cambridge University Press. ISBN 978-1107403987.
- Rachel Hope Cleves (2014). Charity and Sylvia: A Same-Sex Marriage in Early America. Oxford University Press. ISBN 978-0190627317.
- Rachel Hope Cleves (2020). Unspeakable: A Life beyond Sexual Morality. University of Chicago Press. ISBN 978-0226733531.
- Rachel Hope Cleves (2024). Lustful Appetites: An Intimate History of Good Food and Wicked Sex. Polity. ISBN 978-1509553631.
