= Frances Wilson (writer) =

English author, academic, and critic

Frances Wilson (born 1964) is an English author, academic, and critic.

== Biography ==
Born in Malawi, Wilson attended The Mount School, York, and read English literature at St Hugh's College, Oxford. She studied Henry James and Freud for her DPhil from the Sussex University. After that she taught English literature at Reading University for ten years, leaving in 2005 to become a full-time writer.

Wilson has reviewed for The Times Literary Supplement, The Spectator, The Oldie, New Statesman, The Guardian, and The Daily Telegraph, and has been a judge for the Whitbread Biography Prize, the Man Booker Prize, the Baillie Gifford Prize, and was chair of the 2020 Goldsmiths Prize. She has been writer in residence at Somerset House and University College London, taught a University of East Anglia/Guardian Masterclass in Biography and has been a Fellow of the Royal Society of Literature since 2009. From 2016 until 2021 Wislon taught creative writing and English literature at Goldsmiths, University of London. She is a co-founder of the how to Academy.

Wilson was the Jean Strouse Fellow at the Dorothy and Lewis B. Cullman Center for Scholars and Writers at the New York Public Library from 2018 to 2019, where she worked on a biography of D. H. Lawrence, which was published by FSG in America and by Bloomsbury Circus in the UK in 2021.

== Bibliography ==
=== Books ===
- Literary Seductions: Compulsive Writers and Diverted Readers (St. Martin's Press, 2000).
- The Courtesan’s Revenge: Harriette Wilson, the Woman Who Blackmailed the King (Faber & Faber, 2003).
- The Ballad of Dorothy Wordsworth (Faber, 2008). Winner of the British Academy's Rose Mary Crawshay Prize.
- How To Survive the Titanic; or The Sinking of J. Bruce Ismay (Bloomsbury, 2011). Winner of the Elizabeth Longford Prize for historical biography, 2012.
- Guilty Thing: A Life of Thomas De Quincey (Bloomsbury Publishing, 2016; Farrar, Straus and Giroux, 2016). Longlisted for the Baillie Gifford Prize 2016, shortlisted for the National Book Critics Circle Award, the LA Times Book Awards, the Historical Writers' Association Non-Fiction Crown award and the BIO Plutarch Prize, named Book of the Year in The Guardian, TLS, The Spectator, and The Telegraph, and cited by Booklist as one of the ten best-reviewed books in America during 2016.
- Burning Man: The Ascent of D. H. Lawrence (London: Bloomsbury Circus, 2021); Burning Man: The Trials of D. H. Lawrence (New York: Farrar, Straus and Giroux, 2021). Winner of the 2022 Plutarch Award and shortlisted for the Duff Cooper Prize and the James Tait Black Memorial Prize.
- Electric Spark: The Enigma of Muriel Spark (London: Bloomsbury Publishing, 2025); Electric Spark: The Enigma of Dame Muriel (New York: Farrar, Straus and Giroux, 2025). Shortlisted for the Baillie Gifford Prize 2025.

=== Introductions, forewords and other contributions ===
- Henry James, A Small Boy and Others: Childhood Memoirs (Gibson Square Books, 2001).
- Henry James, The Wings of the Dove (Folio Society, 2005).
- Henry James, The Ambassadors (Folio Society, 2006).
- The Adventures of Casanova (Folio Society, 2007).
- Daniel Defoe, Roxana (Folio Society, 2010).
- Thomas Bernhard, My Prizes: An Accounting (Notting Hill Editions, 2011).
- Lorna Sage, Bad Blood (Fourth Estate, 2020)
- D. H. Lawrence, The Man Who Loved Islands: Sixteen Stories by D. H. Lawrence (riverrun editions, 2021)

=== Book reviews ===
Year	Review article	Work(s) reviewed
2014	Wilson, Frances (21 November 2014). "Faces in the crowd : as Napoleon roamed, the home front was feverish". New Statesman. 143 (5237): 42–43.	Uglow, Jenny (2014). In These Times: Living in Britain Through Napoleon's Wars, 1793-1815. London: Faber & Faber.
