= Giuseppe Orioli (painter) =

Italian painter (1681–1750)

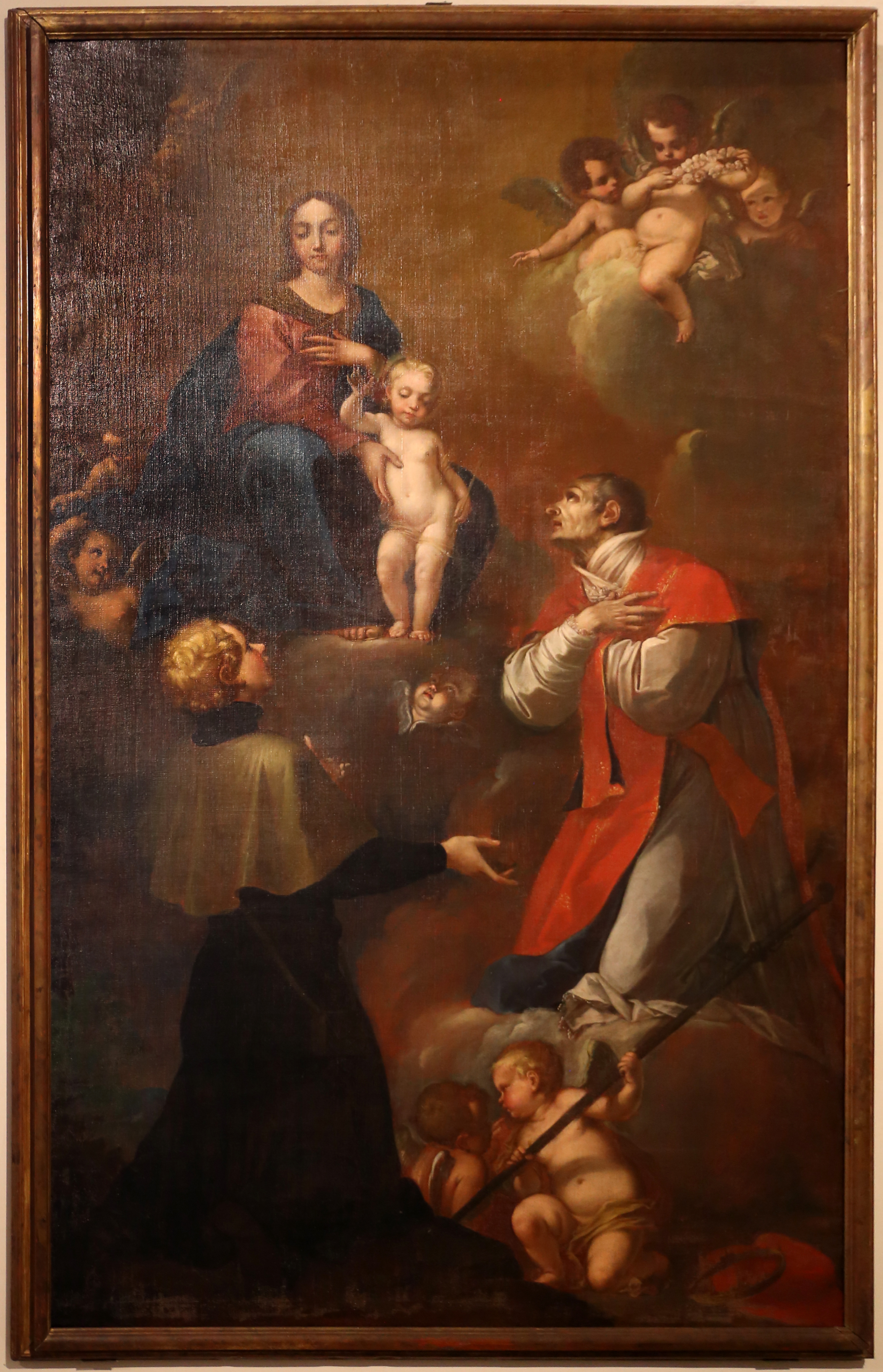
Madonna and Saints, palazzo Ducale, Mantua

Giuseppe Orioli (or Oriolo; 17 July 1681 – 1750) was an Italian painter of the late-Baroque.

== Biography ==
Oriolo was born and died in Mantua. His father was a shipwright. After his father's death in 1695, Giuseppe moved to Bologna, to study under Gian Gioseffo Dal Sole. His first known work is a Madonna and Child with Satints Joseph, Apollonia, Carlo Borromeo, Catherine of Bologna, Francis of Paola, and Francis of Sales (1713) for the Church of Suffragio in Faenza. Orioli returns to Mantua by 1719.

He painted an Immaculate Conception with prophets Elia and Eliseo (1722) for the main altar of the church of the Carmine at Canneto sull’Oglio. He painted St Paul the Hermit (1724) for the presbytery of the parish church of Portiolo. He painted a St Anthony of Padua (1725) for the altar of Sant Margherita in the basilica of Santa Barbara in the Ducal Palace complex of Mantua.

In about 1726, he painted a triptych of a small chapel in the palace, now in the Palace museum. It is constituted by a central altarpiece with the Immaculate conception with Saints Anselm, Louis Gonzaga, and Giovanni Bono, and two lateral pieces with Saints Longinus and the Blessed Osanna Andreasi.

The Servite church of San Barnaba has a Madonna and child with Filippo Benizi (1730); and seven portraits of Founders of the Servite order (1732), and an altarpiece of the Madonna and child with St John of Nepomuk and a Bishop (Italian: Madonna col Bambino e san Giovanni Nepomuceno e un vescovo).

In 1736, he painted a Madonna and child with Saints Stanislao Kostka ad Francesco Borgia for the former church of Ss. Trinità dei gesuiti. In 1738, he painted an Immaculate Conception with Saints Anne, Benedict, and Jerome for the parish church of Boccadiganda. He also painted in 1738 an altarpiece, now lost, of the Blessed Osanna Andreasi e i ss. Vincenzo Ferreri e Antonio Abate, for the parish church of Buscoldo. The Altarpiece of the Church of San Rocco is by Oriolo.
