= War poetry =

Poetry on the topic of war

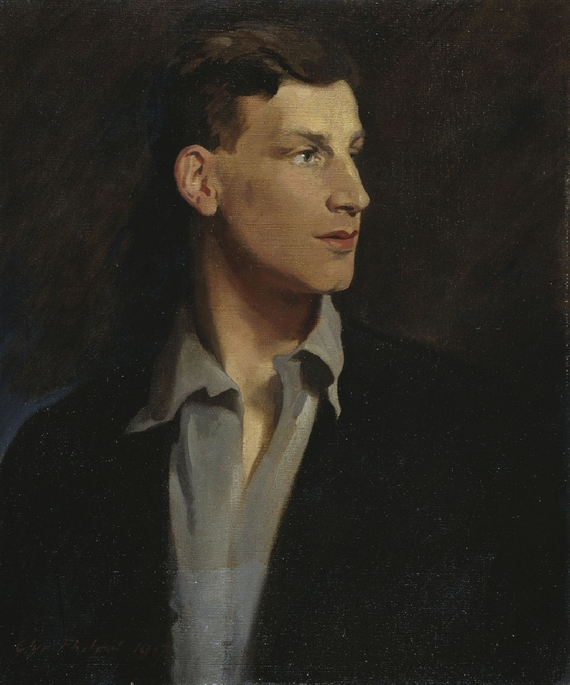
Siegfried Sassoon, a British war poet famous for his poetry written during the First World War

War poetry is poetry on the topic of war. While the term is applied especially to works of the First World War, the term can be applied to poetry about any war, including Homer's Iliad, from around the 8th century BC as well as poetry of the American Civil War, the Spanish Civil War, the Crimean War and other wars. War poets may be combatants or noncombatants.

== Ancient times ==
The Iliad is an epic poem in dactylic hexameter which is believed to have been composed by Homer, a blind Greek Bard from Ionia. It is among the oldest surviving works of Western literature, believed to have begun as oral literature. The first written form is usually dated to around the 8th century BC. The Iliad is set during the ten-year siege of the polis of Troy (Ilium), ruled by King Priam and his sons Hector and Paris, by a massive army from a coalition of Greek states led by King Agamemnon of Mycenae.

The events between the cremation of Hector and the Fall of Troy are expanded upon in the 4th century epic poem Posthomerica, by Quintus of Smyrna. In pre-Islamic Persia, the war poem Ayadgar-i Zariran ('Memorial of Zarer') was composed; it was preserved by Zoroastrian priests after the Muslim conquest of Persia. In its surviving manuscript form, "The Memorial of Zarer" represents one of the earliest surviving works of Iranian literature and the only surviving epic poem in Pahlavi. Historically, Iranian epic poems such as this one were composed and sung by travelling minstrels, who in pre-Islamic and Zoroastrian times were a fixture of Iranian society.

Classical Tamil Sangam literature includes poems about kingship, warfare, heroism, death, glory, and stoicism. The Purananuru , an anthology of poems concerning public life in ancient Tamil society, also explores the relationship between poets, bards, musicians, and rulers, including the role of royal patronage. George L. Hart and Hank Heifetz translated the anthology into English as The Four Hundred Songs of War and Wisdom.

== Early medieval period ==
Ferdowsi's 11th century Shahnameh ("Book of Kings") retells the mythical and to some extent the historical past of the Persian Empire from the creation of the world until the Muslim conquest in the 7th century. It is one of the world's longest epic poems created by a single poet, and the national epic of Greater Iran. The Shahnameh also contains many works of war poetry. Armenia's national epic, Sasna Tsrer (Daredevils of Sassoun), is set during the time of the invasion of Armenia by the Caliphate of Baghdad (about 670), and focuses on the resistance of four generations within the same family, which culminates with Armenian folk hero David of Sasun driving the Muslim invaders from Armenia. It was collected and written down from the oral tradition by Fr. Garegin Srvandztiants, a celibate priest of the Armenian Apostolic Church, in 1873. The epic was first published in Constantinople in 1874. It is better known as Sasuntsi Davit ("David of Sasun").

=== United Kingdom and Ireland ===
The Old English poem The Battle of Maldon, which survives only in an unfinished fragment, celebrates the battle of the same name. The Battle of Brunanburh in 937 is also celebrated by an Old English poem of the same name in the Anglo-Saxon Chronicle, which in 1880 was translated into modern English, in a metrical mixture of Trochees and dactyls, by Alfred Tennyson. The anti-hero Egill Skallagrímsson of Egil's Saga, attributed to the twelfth-century bard Snorri Sturluson, is portrayed as having fought in the Battle of Brunanburh in 937 as an elite mercenary soldier for Æthelstan.

The foundational masterpiece of Welsh poetry, Y Gododdin (c. 638 – c. 1000), tells how Mynyddog Mwynfawr, the King of Gododdin in the Hen Ogledd, summoned warriors from several other Welsh kingdoms and led them in a campaign against the Anglo-Saxons which culminated with the Battle of Catraeth around the year 600. The narrator names himself as Aneirin and professes to have been one of only two to four Welsh survivors of the battle.

The Brussels Manuscript of the Cogad Gáedel re Gallaib, which is believed to have been written around 1635 by Franciscan friar and historian Mícheál Ó Cléirigh, contains many Irish war poems not found elsewhere. Like the other two surviving manuscripts, the Brussels Manuscript relates the wars between the Irish clans and the Norse and Danish invaders, and celebrates the ultimate rise to power of Brian Boru as High King of Ireland.

== High medieval period ==
The Song of Dermot and the Earl is an anonymous Anglo-Norman verse chronicle written in the early 13th century in England. It retells the 1170 invasion of Ireland by Diarmait Mac Murchada, the wars that followed between the invaders and Haskulf Thorgilsson, the last Hiberno-Norse King of Dublin and Ruaidrí Ua Conchobair, the last High King of Ireland, and the subsequent visit to Ireland by King Henry II of England in 1172. The chronicle survived only in a single manuscript which was re-discovered in the 17th century at Lambeth Palace in London. The manuscript bears no title, but has been commonly dubbed The Song of Dermot and the Earl since Goddard Henry Orpen published a diplomatic edition under this title in 1892.

In medieval Tamil literature, Kalingattuparani, composed by Jayamkondar, is an example of war poetry in the parani genre. The work comprises 596 verses celebrating the Invasion of Kalinga, 1110 during the reign of Kulottunga Chola I (1070–1120), led by his general Karunakara Tondaiman. The parani genre traditionally celebrates a warrior's victory in battle, and the work depicts the military campaign and its outcome. Its editor's introduction discusses the genre's association with the worship of the Tamil victory goddess Korravai and the tradition of praising victorious warriors.

The Tale of Igor's Campaign (Слово о пълкѹ Игоревѣ), an epic poem in Old East Slavic, describes a failed raid made in the year 1185 by an army led by Prince Igor Svyatoslavich of Novgorod-Seversk against the Polovtsians (Cumans), Pagan Turkic nomads living along the southern banks of the Don River. Since its 18th-century rediscovery in a 15th-century manuscript from Yaroslavl and 1800 publication by Aleksei Musin-Pushkin, The Lay has inspired other poems, art, music, and the opera Prince Igor by Alexander Borodin. It is claimed by Russians, Belarusians, and Ukrainians as a national epic. As the main characters of the poem came from modern Ukraine, The Lay has had a massive influence on Ukrainian literature. The Lay also captured the imagination of the intelligentsia during the Golden Age of Russian Poetry and has had a major influence on Russian literature and culture.

In 1375, Scottish Makar, or court poet, John Barbour completed the epic poem The Brus, which celebrates the deeds of Robert the Bruce, who led the Scottish people in their Wars of Independence against Kings Edward I and Edward II of England and who ultimately became King of Scotland. Around 1488, fellow Scottish Makar Blind Harry wrote the epic poem The Wallace, about the life and death of iconic Scottish nationalist Sir William Wallace. The events of the Scottish Wars of Independence are also a regular theme in the verse of Scotland's national poet, Robert Burns.

The 15th-century poem Zadonschina, which draws upon the same tradition of Pre-Christian Slavic war poetry as The Tale of Igor, was composed to glorify the victory of Dmitri Donskoi, Great Prince of Moscow over Mamai and the Mongols of the Golden Horde at the Battle of Kulikovo along the Don River on 8 September 1380. The poem survives in six medieval manuscripts. The author of Zadonshchina is believed to have been Sofonii (Russian: Софоний). His name as the author of the text is mentioned in two surviving manuscript copies.

== Early modern period ==
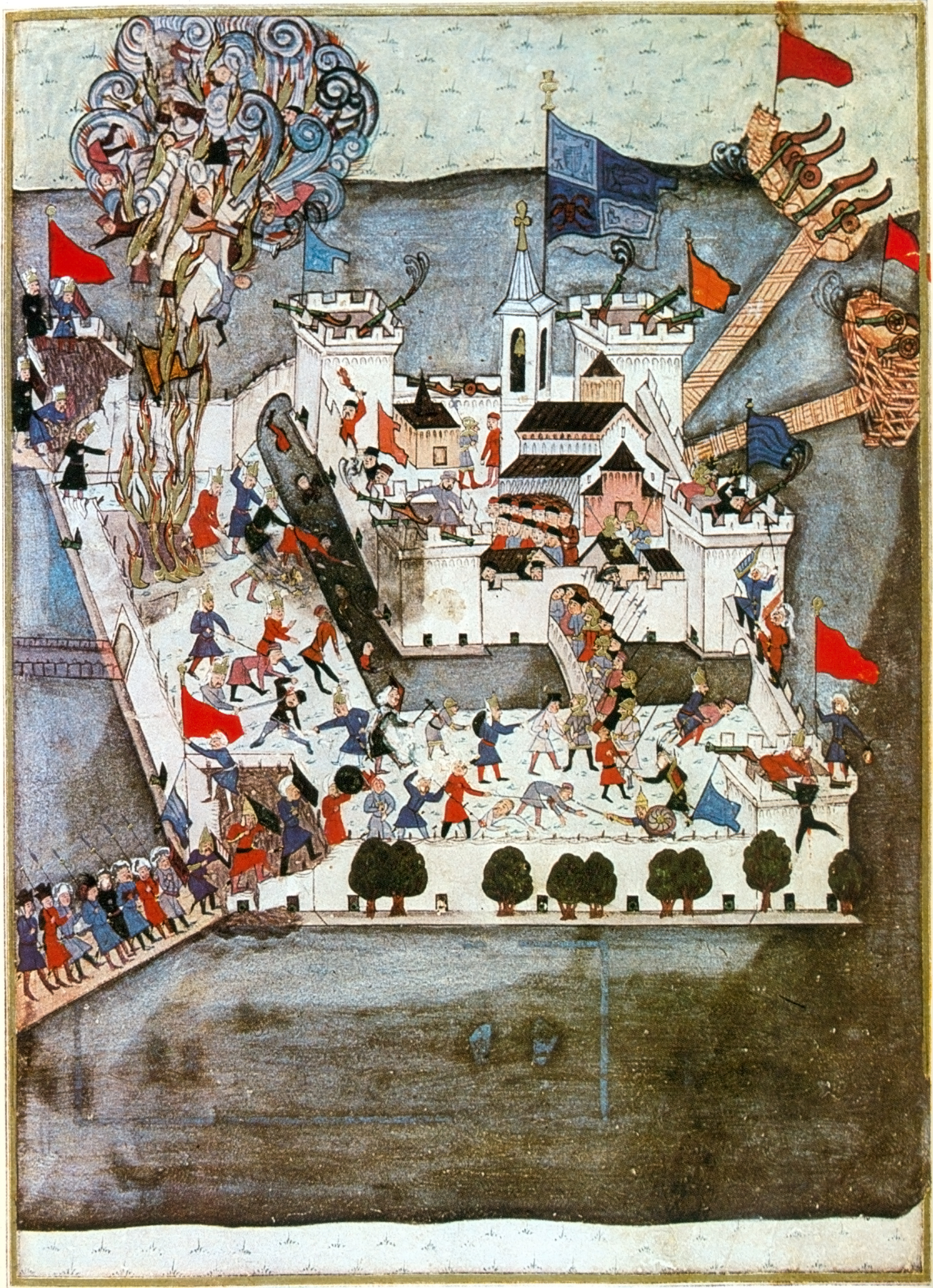
Ottoman miniature showing the Siege of Szigetvár

The Battle of Flodden on 9 September 1513, in which an English army led by the Earl of Surrey defeated and killed King James IV of Scotland and gave no quarter to an estimated 12,000 nobles and commons recruited from both the Scottish Highlands and Lowlands, is sometimes considered the end of the Middle Ages in the British Isles. By far the most famous war poem about the battle is the poem in Scots, The Flowers of the Forest by Lady Jean Elliot. In 1755, Lady Jean published the lyrics anonymously and The Flowers of the Forest was at first thought to be an ancient ballad. However, Robert Burns suspected it was an imitation, and together with Ramsay and Sir Walter Scott eventually identified the author.

Bálint Balassi (1554–1594) was one of the first great Hungarian poets. He was also a soldier. He participated in the Battle of Kerelőszentpál in 1575, during which he was captured by the Transylvanian troops of prince Stephen Báthory. Between 1579 and 1582, he served as an officer at Eger Castle, participating in ongoing battles against the Turks. He then participated in the 15-year war, during which he was hit by a Turkish cannonball at the siege of Esztergom Castle. He died from those injuries on 19 May 1594, after 10 days of suffering. Balassi wrote several military-themed poems. His most famous poem, A végek dicsérete (In Praise of Frontierlands), was written in 1589 and it depicts the soldiers of the Hungarian frontier castles (végvárak) and their battles against the Turks.

The 1566 Battle of Szigetvár, in which a vastly outnumbered army of 2,300 Croatian and Hungarian soldiers in service to the Habsburg monarchy and under the command of Nikola IV Zrinski, the Ban of Croatia, defended the Hungarian fortress of the same name against an enormous Ottoman army under the command of Sultan Suleiman the Magnificent, has thrice been made the subject of epic poetry.

The first epic poem about the Siege was composed in Croatian by the poet Brne Karnarutić of Zadar, titled Vazetje Sigeta grada (English: The Taking of the City of Siget), and posthumously published at Venice in 1584. Karnarutić is known to have based his account very heavily on the memoirs of Zrinski's valet, Franjo Črnko. Karnarutić is known to have drawn further inspiration from Marko Marulić's Judita.

In 1651, Hungarian poet Miklós Zrínyi, the great-grandson of Nikola Zrinski, published the epic poem Szigeti veszedelem ("The Siege of Sziget"). According to Encyclopædia Britannica Online, The Siege of Sziget is "the first epic poem in Hungarian literature" and "one of the major works of Hungarian literature". Kenneth Clark's Civilisation describes Szigeti veszedelem as one of the major literary achievements of the 17th century. Even though John Milton's Paradise Lost is often credited with resurrecting Classical epic poetry, Milton's poem was published in 1667, sixteen years after Zrínyi's Szigeti Veszedelem.

Another Croatian nobleman warrior-poet Pavao Ritter Vitezović wrote about the Battle. His poem Odiljenje sigetsko ("The Sziget Farewell"), first published in 1684, reminisces about the event without rancour or crying for revenge. The last of the four cantos is titled "Tombstones" and consists of epitaphs for the Croatian and Turkish warriors who died during the siege, paying equal respect to both.

=== Thirty Years War ===
In her book The Real Personage of Mother Goose, author Katherine Elwes Thomas alleges that the English nursery rhyme The Queen of Hearts is about the events that caused the outbreak of the Thirty Years War. The King and Queen of Hearts are, according to Elwes Thomas, a thinly disguised description of Elector Palatine (German: Kurfürst von der Pfalz) Friedrich V and his wife Elizabeth Stuart. The Queen's decision to bake tarts refers to her persuasion of her Calvinist husband to accept the Czech nobility's offer of the throne of the Kingdom of Bohemia, after the local officials of "The Knave of Hearts", the Holy Roman Emperor Ferdinand II, were overthrown in a palace coup known as the Third Defenestration of Prague.

In German poetry, the Baroque anti-war sonnets of Andreas Gryphius remain well known. Gryphius made many enemies for himself by denouncing the destruction, suffering, and needless civilian casualties left behind by the private armies of both sides in both verse form and in prose. Gryphius's first collection of poems, Sonnete ("Sonnets"), was published in 1637 by Wigand Funck in Lissa, and is accordingly known as the Lissaer Sonettbuch, after the town. The collection of 31 sonnets includes some of his best known poems, such as "Vanitas vanitatum, et omnia vanitas", later titled "Es ist alles eitel" (All is vanity), about the effects of war and the transitoriness of human life; "Menschliches Elende" (Human misery); and "Trawrklage des verwüsteten Deutschlandes" (Lament of a Devastated Germany). In 1632, Gryphius had witnessed the pillaging and burning of the Silesian town of Freystadt by the Protestant troops of King Gustavus Adolphus of Sweden. Gryphius immortalized the sack of the city in a detailed eyewitness account titled Fewrige Freystadt, which made him many enemies.

== 18th century ==
=== Jacobite risings of 1715 and 1745 ===
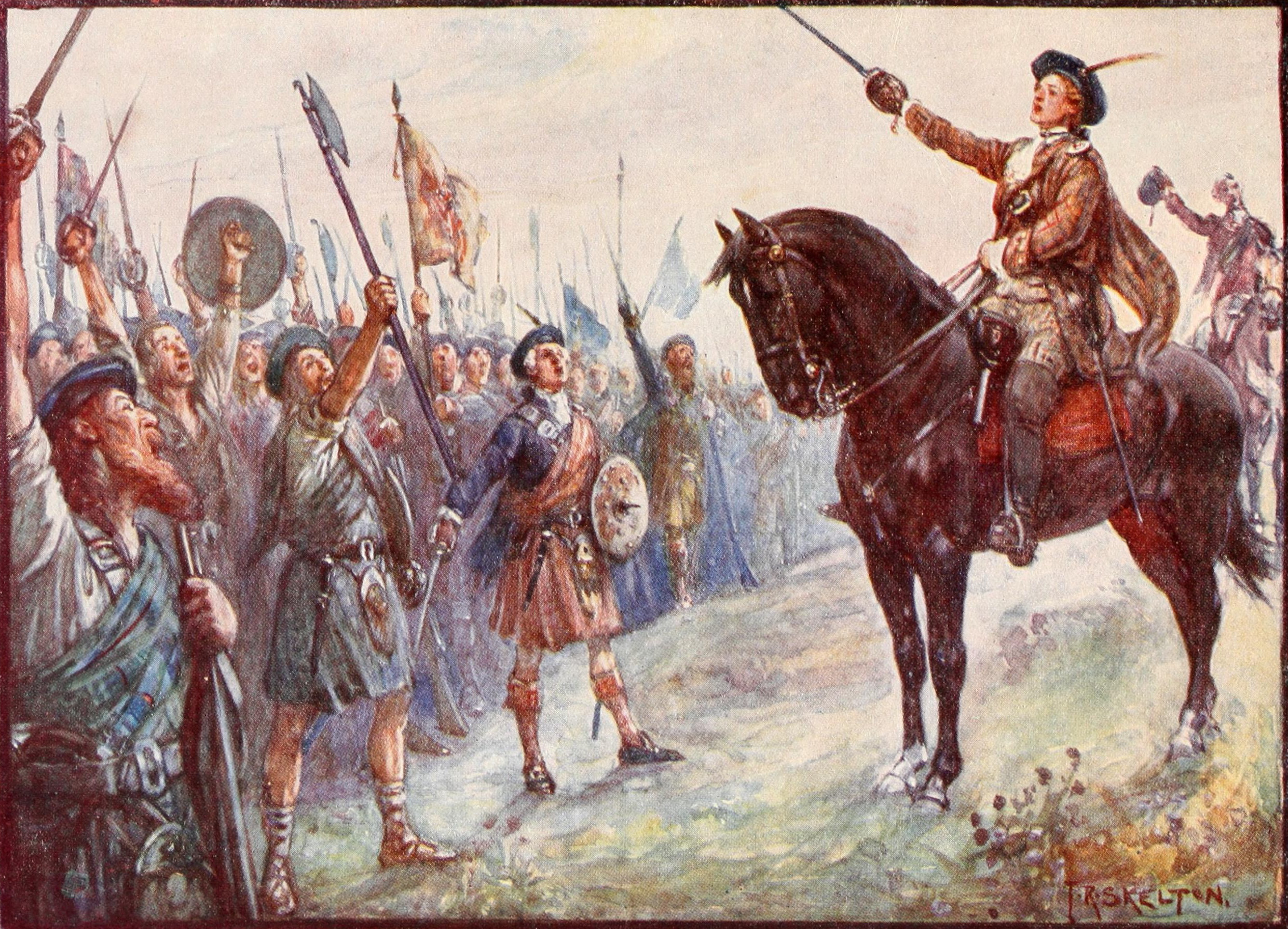
Charles Stuart, romantic icon; from A History of Scotland for Boys and Girls by H. E. Marshall, published 1906

In the song Là Sliabh an t-Siorraim, Sìleas na Ceapaich, the daughter of the 15th Chief of Clan MacDonald of Keppoch, sings of the joy upon the arrival of Prince James Francis Edward Stuart, the indecisive Battle of Sheriffmuir and the state of uneasy anticipation between the battle and the end of the Jacobite rising of 1715.

The most iconic poem by Sìleas, however, inspired by the events of the Uprising was only completed many years later. When Ailean Dearg, the Chief of Clan Macdonald of Clanranald had been mortally wounded at the Battle of Sherrifmuir, Alasdair Dubh, 11th Chief of Clan MacDonald of Glengarry rallied the faltering warriors of Clan Donald by throwing up his Highland bonnet and crying Buillean an-diugh, tuiream a-màireach! ("Blows today, mourning tomorrow!"). Following Alasdair Dubh's death (c. 1721 or 1724), he was eulogized by Sìleas in the song-poem Alistair à Gleanna Garadh, which hearkens back to the mythological poetry attributed to Amergin Glúingel and which remains an iconic and oft imitated work of Scottish Gaelic literature.

In Scottish Gaelic literature, the greatest war poet of the Jacobite rising of 1745 is Alasdair Mac Mhaighstir Alasdair, a tacksman from the Clanranald branch of Clan Donald. Jacobite songs penned by Alasdair such as: Òran Nuadh – "A New Song", Òran nam Fineachan Gaidhealach – "The Song of the Highland Clans" and Òran do'n Phrionnsa – "A Song to the Prince," serve as testament to the Bard's passionate loyalty to the House of Stuart. According to literary historian John MacKenzie, these poems were sent to Aeneas MacDonald, the brother of the Clanranald tacksman of Kinlochmoidart. Aeneas read the poems aloud to Prince Charles Edward Stuart in English translation and the poems played a major role in convincing the Prince to come to Scotland and to initiate the Jacobite Rising of 1745.

Other poems about the Uprising were written in both Gaelic and English by John Roy Stewart, who served as colonel of the Edinburgh Regiment and a close and trusted confidant of Prince Charles Edward Stuart.

The Irish poem Mo Ghile Mear, which was composed by the County Cork Bard Seán "Clárach" Mac Domhnaill, is a lament for the defeat of the Uprising at the Battle of Culloden. The poem is a soliloquy by the Kingdom of Ireland, whom Seán Clárach personifies, according to the rules of the Aisling genre, as a woman from the Otherworld. The woman laments her state and describes herself as a grieving widow due to the defeat and exile of her lawful King.

Poems about the Jacobite rising of 1745 have also been written in English by Sir Walter Scott, Carolina Nairne, Agnes Maxwell MacLeod, Allan Cunningham, and William Hamilton. However, even as the British upper class and the literary world were romanticizing the Uprising and the culture of the Scottish clans, the suppression of Highland Scottish culture, which had begun after the rising's defeat, continued for nearly two centuries afterward.

=== American Revolution ===
Henry Wadsworth Longfellow's 1860 poem Paul Revere's Ride both retells and fictionalizes the efforts of Boston silversmith Paul Revere to warn Patriot militia of an imminent attack by the British Army on the night before the Battles of Lexington and Concord in April 1775. Longfellow's poem was first published in the January 1861 issue of The Atlantic Monthly and later included as part of Longfellow's 1863 poetry collection Tales of a Wayside Inn.

Ralph Waldo Emerson's 1837 poem Concord Hymn pays tribute to the Patriot militia at the Battle of Concord and famously says that they fired, "The shot heard round the world."

David Humphreys wrote the first sonnet in American poetry in 1776, right before he left Yale College to fight as a colonel in the Continental Army during the American Revolutionary War. Colonel Humphreys' sonnet was titled Addressed to my Friends at Yale College, on my leaving them to join the Army.

Among the earliest known Scottish Gaelic poets in North America, is Kintail-born Iain mac Mhurchaidh, a poet from Clan Macrae, who emigrated to Moore County in the Colony of North Carolina around 1774, fought as a Loyalist during the American Revolution, and composed Gaelic war poetry there until his death around 1780.

In 1783, the year that saw the end of the American Revolution and the beginning of the Highland Clearances in Inverness-shire, Cionneach mac Cionnich, a poet from Clan MacKenzie who was born at Castle Leather near Inverness, composed the only surviving Gaelic poem of the era which takes up the Patriot, rather than the Loyalist, banner - The Lament of the North. In the poem, MacCionnich mocks the Scottish clan chiefs for becoming absentee landlords, for both rackrenting and evicting their clansmen en masse in favor of sheep, and of "spending their wealth uselessly", in London. He accuses King George III both of tyranny and of steering the ship of state into shipwreck. MacCionnich also argues that truth is on the side of George Washington and the Continental Army and that the Gaels would do well to emigrate from the Highlands and Islands to the United States before the King and the landlords take every farthing they have left.

== 19th century ==
=== Greece ===
During the early 19th century, Albanian Muslim bard Haxhi Shehreti composed the epic poem Alipashiad. The work is inspired by and named after Ali Pasha, the governor of the Pashalik of Ioannina in Ottoman Greece, describing, in heroic style, his life, and his military campaigns. The poem is written in Demotic Greek, which Shehreti considered a far more prestigious language than Turkish or Albanian. Historically, the Alipashiad is unique in Greek poetry due to its having been written from an Islamic point of view.

The Greek War of Independence raged from 1821 to 1830 and resulted in the independence of the Greek people after more than four hundred years of rule by the Ottoman Empire. The uprising and its many predecessors also produced many great composers of war poetry. In English poetry, Lord Byron is by far the most famous of these poets. Byron travelled to Greece during the fighting and joined the Greek rebels. Byron also glorified the Greek cause in many of his poems, which continued to be widely read.

Even though he was strangled inside Nebojša Tower in Belgrade by order of Sultan Selim III of the House of Osman in 1798 while planning a Greek uprising with the assistance of Napoleon Bonaparte, the nationalist verse of Rigas Feraios helped inspire the Greek War of Independence and he remains a major figure in Greek poetry. In his poems, Feraios urged the Greek people to leave the cities for the mountains and to fight in the mountains to gain their independence.

Dionysios Solomos, another poet of the Greek War of Independence, wrote the Hymn to Liberty, which is now the Greek national anthem, in 1823, just two years after the Greeks rose against the Ottoman Empire. It is also the national anthem of Cyprus, which adopted it in 1966. Solomos is considered to be the national poet of Greece.

=== Hungarian War of Independence ===
During the Hungarian War of Independence (1848–1849), many Hungarian writers and poets, such as Mór Jókai, Béni Egressy, Kálmán Lisznyai, Pál Gyulai or Mihály Tompa, took part as soldiers and wrote poems, short stories and articles about the battles. The most notable of these was Sándor Petőfi (1823-1849), a poet who joined the Hungarian army voluntarily, and fought as a major from January 1849 until 31 July when he was killed in battle. He wrote numerous poems about the battles in which he participated and his experiences as a soldier, including his admiration for his commander, General Józef Bem: Examples include Négy nap dörgött az ágyú (Four Days the Cannons Roared), Csatában (In Battle), Az erdélyi hadsereg (The Transylvanian Army), A székelyek (The Szeklers), Egy goromba tábornokhoz (To a Rude General), A huszár (The Hussar), A honvéd (The Honvéd), Föl a szent háborúra! (Up for the Holy War!), and Szörnyű idő... (Terrible Times...). Although General Bem tried to spare him from dangerous battles by often sending him to the capital to deliver letters to the government, he could not escape his fate. He fell victim to Russian Cossack spears at the Battle of Segesvár.

=== Crimean War ===
Probably the most famous 19th-century war poem is Tennyson's "The Charge of the Light Brigade", which he supposedly wrote in only a few minutes after reading an account of the battle in The Times. It immediately became hugely popular, even reaching the troops in the Crimea, where it was distributed in pamphlet form.

=== American Civil War ===
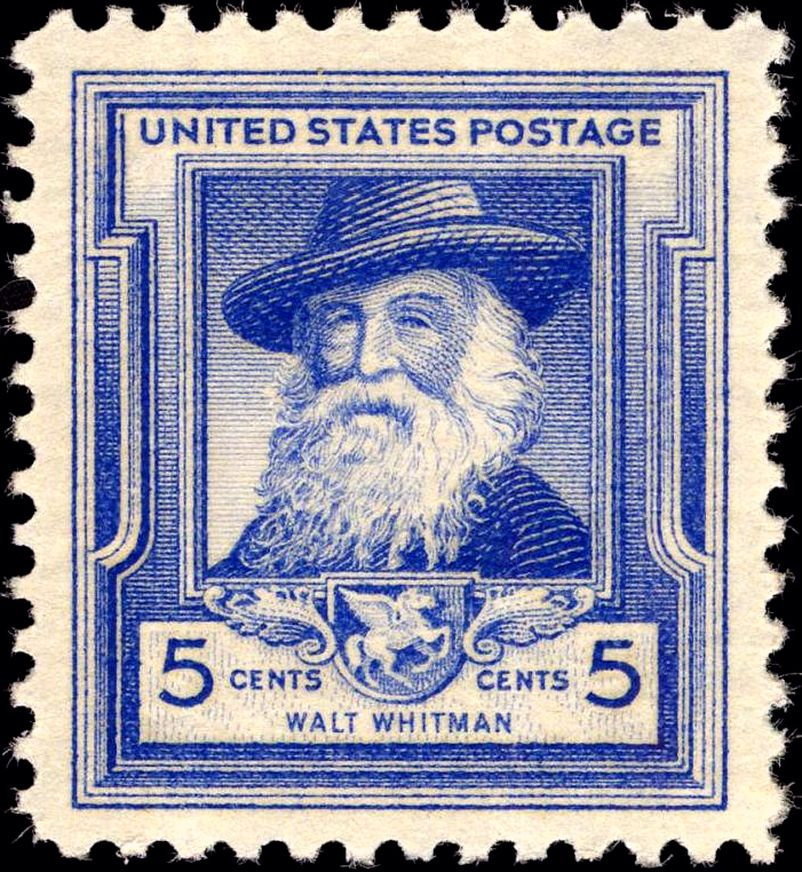
Commemorative stamp of American poet Walt Whitman in 1940

As the American Civil War was beginning, American poet Walt Whitman published his poem "Beat! Beat! Drums!" as a patriotic rally call for the North. Whitman volunteered for a time as a nurse in the army hospitals, and his collection Drum-Taps (1865) deals with his experiences during the War.

On 18 July 1863, Die Minnesota-Staats-Zeitung, a newspaper published by and for German-speaking Forty-Eighters living in Minnesota, printed An die Helden des Ersten Minnesota Regiments ("To the Heroes of the First Minnesota Regiment"), a work of German poetry in tribute to the Union soldiers of the 1st Minnesota Infantry Regiment and their iconic charge from Cemetery Ridge during the second day of the Battle of Gettysburg. The poet was G. A. Erdman of Hastings, Minnesota.

Also during the American Civil War, Edward Thomas, a Welsh-language poet whose Bardic name was Awenydd, enlisted in Company E of the 2nd Minnesota Cavalry Regiment. During his service in that Regiment, Thomas wrote many Welsh poems, including Pryddest ar Wir Fawredd.

On the Confederate side, the most well-known Civil War poet is Father Abram Ryan, a Roman Catholic priest and former military chaplain to the Confederate Army. Father Ryan, who eulogized the defeated South in poems like The Conquered Banner and The Sword of Lee, is sometimes referred to as "The Poet-Priest of the Confederacy," and as "The Poet Laureate of the South."

=== Boer War ===
Rudyard Kipling wrote poetry in support of the British cause in the Boer War, including the well-known "Lichtenberg", which is about a combatant's death in a foreign land. Swinburne, Thomas Hardy, and others wrote also poems relating to the Boer War. Hardy's poems include "Drummer Hodge", and "The Man He Killed". '"Swinburne regularly donated work to the papers to rouse the spirit, from 'Transvaal', with the infamous closing line, 'Strike, England, and strike home', to 'The Turning of the Tide'."

During the last phase of the war in the former Orange Free State, the Afrikaner people of Winburg taunted the Scottish regiments in the local British Army garrison with a parody of the Jacobite ballad Bonnie Dundee, which was generally sung in English. The parody celebrated the guerrilla warfare of Boer Commando leader Christiaan De Wet.

== World War I ==
Published poets wrote over two thousand poems about and during the war. However, only a small fraction still is known today, and several poets that were popular with contemporary readers are now obscure. An orthodox selection of poets and poems emerged during the 1960s, which often remains the standard in modern collections and distorts the impression of World War I poetry. This selection tends to emphasize the horror of war, suffering, tragedy and anger against those that wage war. In a 2020 article for the St Austin Review about American WWI poet John Allan Wyeth, Dana Gioia writes, "The First World War changed European literature forever. The horror of modern mechanized warfare and the slaughter of nineteen million young men and innocent civilians traumatized the European imagination. For poets, the unprecedented scale of violence annihilated the classic traditions of war literature – individual heroism, military glory, and virtuous leadership. Writers struggled for a new idiom commensurate with their apocalyptic personal experience. European Modernism emerged from the trenches of the Western Front.

"British poetry especially was transformed by the trauma of trench warfare and indiscriminate massacre. The 'War Poets' constitute an imperative presence in modern British literature with significant writers such as Wilfred Owen, Robert Graves, Siegfried Sassoon, David Jones, Ivor Gurney, Rupert Brooke, Edward Thomas, and Isaac Rosenberg. Their work, which combined stark realism and bitter irony with a sense of tragic futility, altered the history of English literature. Similar cohorts of war poets occupy important positions in other European literatures. French literature has Charles Peguy, Guillaume Apollinaire, and Blaise Cendrars (who lost his right arm at the Second Battle of Champagne). Italian poetry has Eugenio Montale, Giuseppe Ungaretti, and Gabriele D'Annunzio. German poetry has Georg Trakl, August Stramm, and Gottfried Benn.

"These scarred survivors reshaped the sensibility of modern verse. The Great War also changed literature in another brutal way; it killed countless young writers." From the war itself until the late 1970s, the genre of war poetry was almost exclusively reserved for male poets. This was based on an idea of an exclusive authenticity limited to the works of those who had fought and died in the war. It excluded other forms of experience in the war, such as mourning, nursing and the home front, which were more likely to be experienced by other demographics such as women. There were over 500 women writing and publishing poetry during World War I. Examples of poems by female poets include Teresa Hooley's A War Film, Jessie Pope's War Girls, Pauline B. Barrington's Education, and Mary H.J. Henderson's An Incident. In addition to giving women greater access to work, the war also gave women greater artistic freedom and space to express their identities as artists.

Serbian World War I poets include: Milutin Bojić, Vladislav Petković Dis, Miloš Crnjanski, Dušan Vasiljev, Ljubomir Micić, Proka Jovkić, Rastko Petrović, Stanislav Vinaver, Branislav Milosavljević, Milosav Jelić, Vladimir Stanimirović. and others.

=== Austria-Hungary ===
Géza Gyóni, a Hungarian poet with twin beliefs in socialism and anti-militarism, had unhappily served in the Austro-Hungarian Army prior to the outbreak of war in 1914. In response, Gyóni had written the great pacifist poem, Cézar, én nem megyek ("Caesar, I Will Not Go"). According to Peter Sherwood, "Gyóni's first, still elated, poems from the Polish Front recall the 16th century Hungarian poet Bálint Balassi's soldiers' songs of the marches, written during the campaign against the Turks." During the Siege of Przemyśl, Gyóni wrote poems to encourage the city's defenders and these verses were published there, under the title, Lengyel mezőkön, tábortúz melett (By Campfire on the Fields of Poland). A copy reached Budapest by aeroplane, which was an unusual feat in those days. According to Erika Papp Faber, "His leaning toward Socialism and his anti-militarist attitude were, for a brief time, suspended, as he was caught up in the general patriotic fervor at the outbreak of World War I. But once he experienced the horrors of war first hand, he soon lost his romantic notions, and returned to the more radical positions of his youth, as it evident in his further volumes." One of his poems from this period, Csak egy éjszakára (For Just One Night) became a prominent anti-war poem and its popularity has lasted well beyond the end of the First World War.

Georg Trakl, an Expressionist poet from Salzburg, enlisted in the Austro-Hungarian Army as a medical officer in 1914. He personally witnessed the Battle of Gródek, fought in the Kingdom of Galicia and Lodomeria, in which the Austro-Hungarian Army suffered a bloody defeat at the hands of the Imperial Russian Army. Georg Trakl is best known for the poem Grodek.

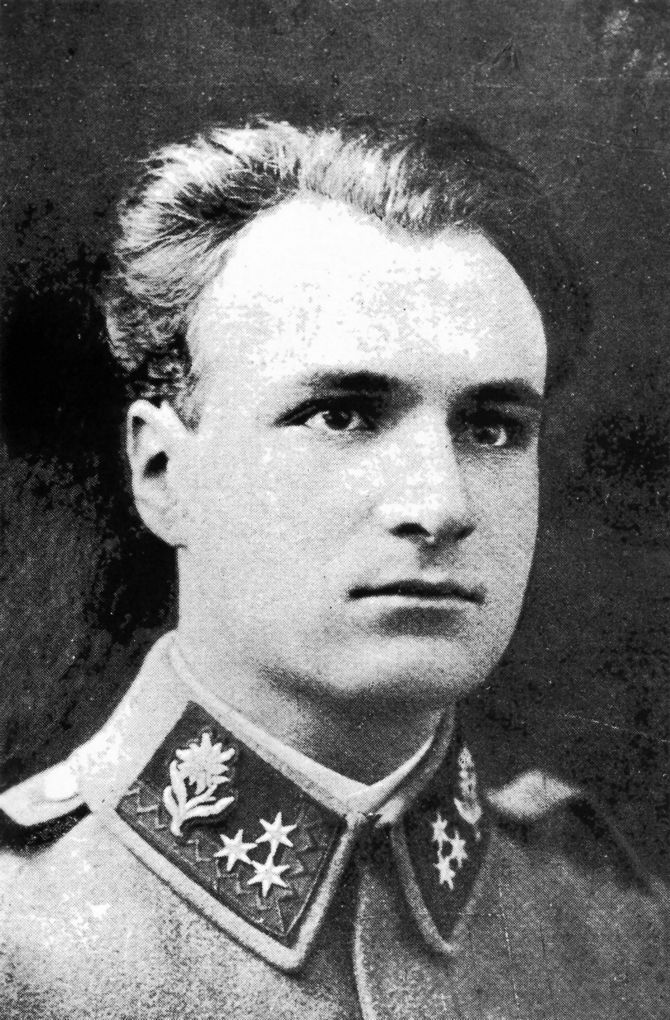
Franz Janowitz (1892–1917)

Franz Janowitz, a Jewish poet who wrote in German from Poděbrady in the Kingdom of Bohemia, had enlisted in the Austro-Hungarian Army in 1913. On 4 November 1917, Janowitz died of wounds received at the Battle of Caporetto. Two years after his death, a volume of Janowitz's war poems, Aus der Erde und anderen Dichtungen ("Out of the Earth and Other Poems") was published in Munich. The first complete collection of his poems, however, came out only in 1992. According to Jeremy Adler, "Franz Janowitz conflicts with the received idea of the best German war poets. Neither realistic, nor ironic, nor properly expressionistic, while he excoriated the battlefield that the whole world had become, he still preserved a Faith in nobility, innocence, and song. Forced into maturity by the war, his poetic voice never lost a certain childlike note – indeed, in some of his best poems, naivety and wisdom coexist to an almost paradoxical degree. Such poetry was fired by a vision of a transcendental realm that lay beyond conflict, but never sought to exclude death. His 25 years, the last four of which were spent in the Army, scarcely left him time to develop a wholly independent voice, but his work displays an increasing mastery of form and deepening of vision. His small oeuvre consists of Novellen, essays, aphorisms, and a handful of the best German poems connected with the Great War."

=== Germany ===
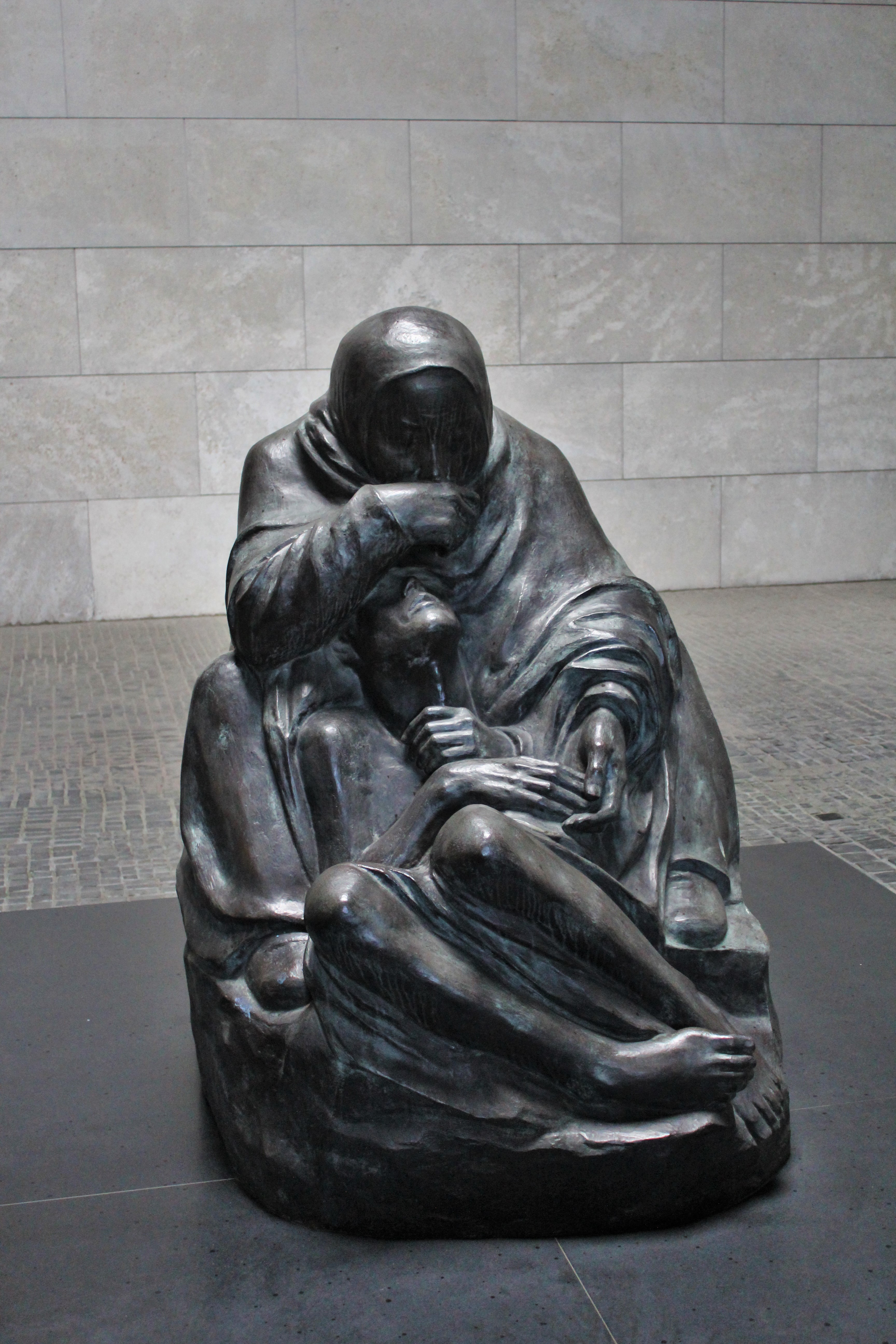
Käthe Kollwitz's sculpture Mother with her Dead Son inside the Neue Wache, which since 1931 has been Germany's Tomb of the Unknown Soldier and national memorial to the fallen soldiers of the Great War, upon Unter Den Linden in Berlin

August Stramm, who is considered the first of the expressionists, has been called by Jeremy Adler one of, "the most innovative poets of the First World War." Stramm, Adler writes, treated, "language like a physical material" and, "honed down syntax to its bare essentials." Citing Stramm's fondness for "fashioning new words out of old," Adler has also written that, "what James Joyce did on a grand scale for English, Stramm achieved more modestly for German." Stramm's war poetry was first published by Herwarth Walden in the avant-garde literary journal Der Sturm and later appeared in the collection Tropfenblut ("Dripping Blood"), which was published in 1919.

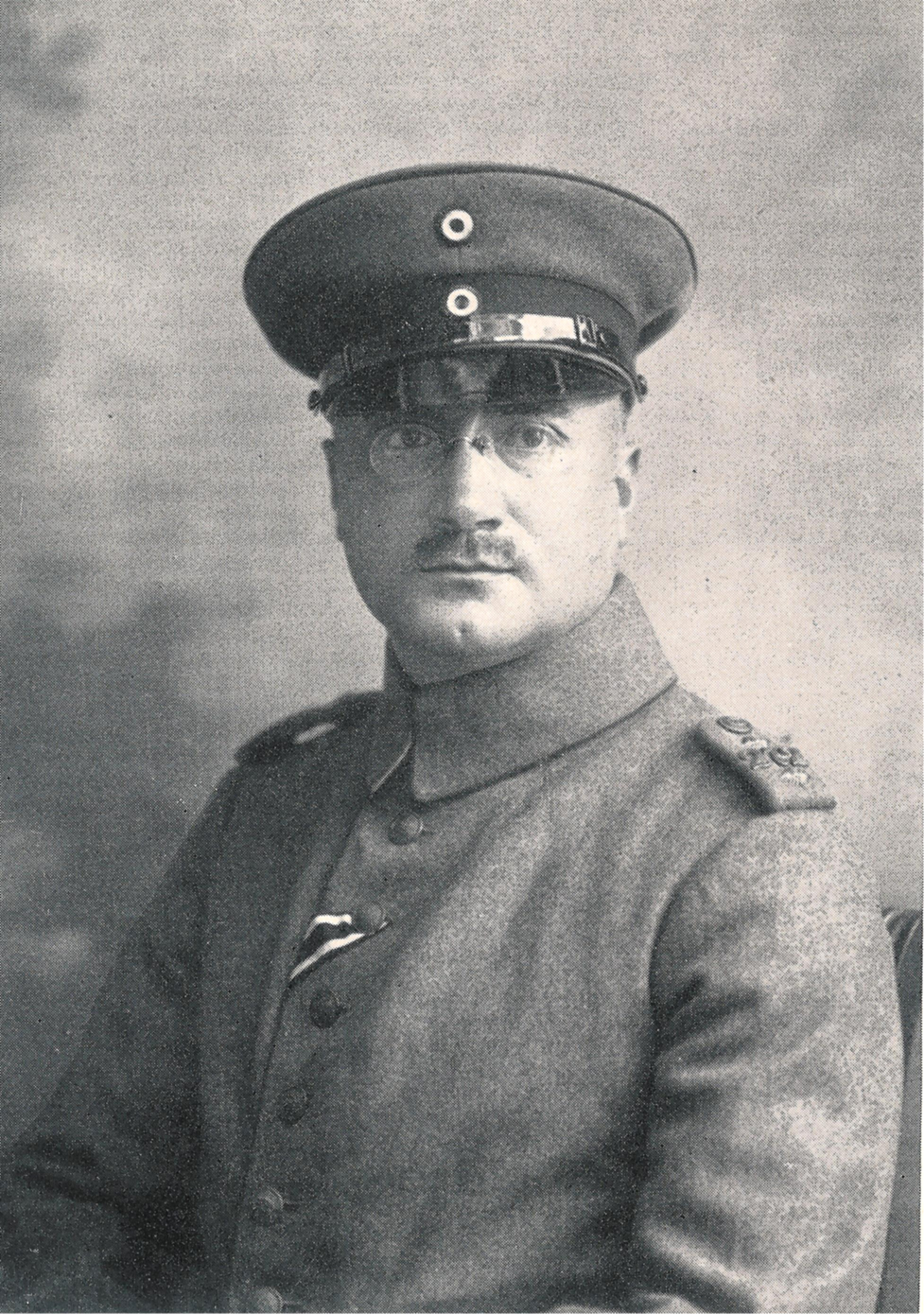
August Stramm (1874–1915)

According to Patrick Bridgwater, "While Stramm is known to have enjoyed his peacetime role of reserve officer, he was too sensitive to have any illusions about the war, which he hated (for all the unholy fascination it held for him). On 12 January 1915, he wrote to Walden from the Western Front, 'I stand like a cramp, unsteady, without a foundation, without a brace, anchored, and numb in the grimace of my will and stubbornness,' and a few months later he wrote to his wife from Galicia that everything was so dreadful, so unspeakably dreadful. Thus while he was always absolutely sure where his duty lay, he did not write a single chauvinistic war poem even at the time when nearly everybody else in Germany – or so it seemed – was doing so. Nor did he write overtly anti-war poems, which his conscience would not have allowed him to do. In retrospect it seems extraordinary that the poem Feuertaufe ("Baptism by Fire") should have caused a scandal in the German press in 1915, for its only conceivable fault is its utter honesty, its attempt to convey the feeling of coming under enemy fire for the first time and its implicit refusal to pretend that the feeling in question was one of heroic excitement."

Gerrit Engelke is best known for his anti-war poem An die Soldaten Des Grossen Krieges ("To the Soldiers of the Great War"), a poem in rhymed dactylic hexameter modeled after the Neo-Classical odes of Friedrich Hölderlin. In the ode, Engelke urges the soldiers of all the combatant nations to join hands together in universal brotherhood. An English translation exists by Patrick Bridgwater.

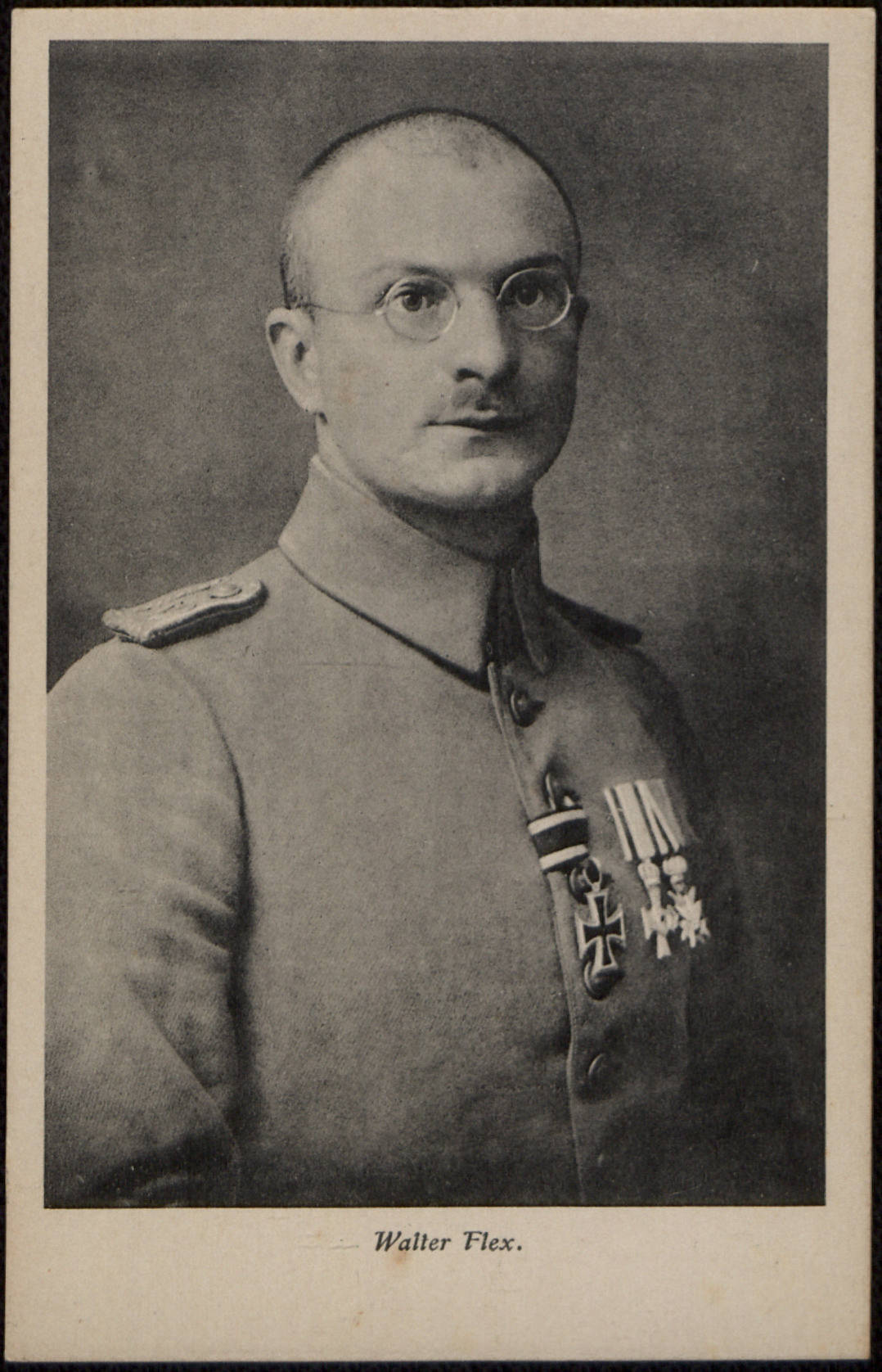
Walter Flex (1887–1917)

Walter Flex, who is best known as the author of the war poem Wildgänse rauschen durch die Nacht and the novella Der Wanderer zwischen Beiden Welten, was a native of Eisenach, in the Grand Duchy of Saxe-Weimar-Eisenach, and had attended the University of Erlangen. At the outbreak of the war, Flex was working as a private tutor to a family from the German nobility. Despite weak ligaments in his right hand, Flex immediately volunteered for the Imperial German Army. Owing to Flex's idealism about the Great War, the posthumous popularity of his writing, and the iconic status that was attached to his wartime death, he is now considered Germany's answer to Allied war poets Rupert Brooke and Alan Seeger.

Yvan Goll, a Jewish poet from Sankt Didel, in the disputed territory of Alsace-Lorraine, wrote bilingually in both German and French. At the outbreak of war in 1914, Goll fled to Zürich, in neutral Switzerland, to evade conscription into the Imperial German Army. While there, he wrote many anti-war poems, in which he sought to promote better understanding between Germany and France. His most famous war poem is Requiem. Für die Gefallenen von Europa (Requiem for the Dead of Europe).

Stefan George, a German poet who had done his literary apprenticeship with the French Symbolist poets during the Belle Époque in Paris, still had many friends in France and viewed the Great War as disastrous. In his 1916 anti-war poem Der Krieg ("The War"), George attacked the horrors that soldiers of all nations were facing in the trenches. In the poem, George famously declared, "Der alte Gott der schlachten ist nicht mehr." ("The ancient god of battles is no more.") In his 1921 collection Drei Gesänge, George returned to the same subject matter in his poems, An die Toten ("To the Dead"), Der Dichter in Zeiten der Wirren ("The Poet in Times of Chaos"), and Einen jungen Führer im Ersten Weltkrieg ("To a Young Officer of the First World War").

Reinhard Sorge, the Kleist Prize winning author of the Expressionist play Der Bettler, saw the coming of the war as an idealistic recent convert to the Roman Catholic Church. Sorge wrote many poems, many of which are in the experimental forms pioneered by August Stramm and Herwarth Walden, about both his Catholic Faith and what he was witnessing as a soldier with the Imperial German Army in France. Four days before being mortally wounded by grenade fragments during the Battle of the Somme, Sorge wrote to his wife expressing a belief that what he called, "the Anglo-French Offensive" was going to succeed in overrunning German defenses. Sorge died in a field hospital at Ablaincourt on 20 July 1916. Susanne Sorge only learned of his death when a letter, in which she informed her husband that she had been pregnant with their second son since his most recent furlough, was returned to her as undeliverable.

In 1920, German poet Anton Schnack, whom Patrick Bridgwater has dubbed, "one of the two unambiguously great," German poets of World War I and, "the only German language poet whose work can be compared with that of Wilfred Owen," published the sonnet sequence, Tier rang gewaltig mit Tier ("Beast Strove Mightily with Beast"). The 60 sonnets that comprise Tier rang gewaltig mit Tier, "are dominated by themes of night and death." Although his ABBACDDCEFGEFG rhyme scheme is typical of the sonnet form, Schnack also, "writes in the long line in free rhythms developed in Germany by Ernst Stadler," whom in turn had been inspired by the experimental free verse which had been introduced into American poetry by Walt Whitman. Patrick Bridgwater, writing in 1985, called Tier rang gewaltig mit Tier, "without question the best single collection produced by a German war poet in 1914–18." Bridgwater adds, however, that Anton Schnack, "is to this day virtually unknown even in Germany."

=== France ===
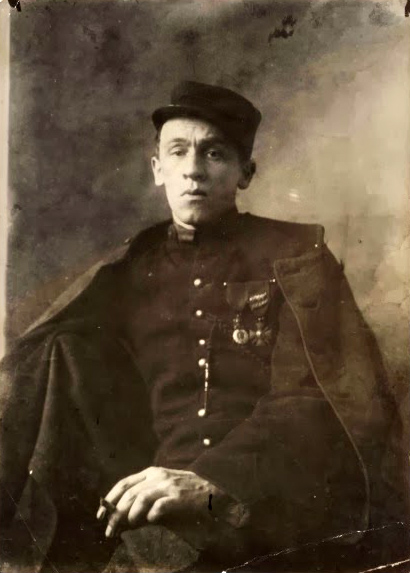
Blaise Cendrars wearing the uniform of the French Foreign Legion in 1916, shortly after the amputation of his right arm

Amongst French World War I poets are the following: Guillaume Apollinaire, Adrien Bertrand, Yvan Goll, and Charles Péguy.

Upon the outbreak of war in 1914, Blaise Cendrars, a Francophone Swiss poet of partially Scottish descent from La Chaux-de-Fonds, Canton of Neuchâtel, was living in Paris and playing a major role in modernist poetry. When it began, Cedrars and Italian writer Ricciotto Canudo appealed to other foreign artists, writers, and intellectuals to join the French Army. He joined the French Foreign Legion. He was sent to the front line in the Somme where from mid-December 1914 until February 1915, he was in the trenches at Frise (La Grenouillère and Bois de la Vache). During the Second Battle of Champagne in September 1915, Cendrars lost his right arm and was discharged from the French Army.

Jean de La Ville de Mirmont, a Huguenot poet from Bourdeaux, was overjoyed by the outbreak of the war. According to Ian Higgins, "Although unfit for active service, Jean de La Ville de Mirmont volunteered immediately when the war broke out, but it was only after being repeatedly turned down that he finally managed to enlist." According to Ian Higgins, "It has been suggested that here at last was the great adventure he had been longing for. Certainly, the prelude to the war 'interested' him, and he was keen to witness and, if possible, take part in a war which was probably going to 'set the whole of Europe on fire.' His Lettres de guerre develop movingly from initial enthusiasm for the defense of Civilization and a conviction that the enemy was the entire German people, through a growing irritation with chauvinistic brainwashing and the flagrancy of what would now be called the 'disinformation' peddled through the French press (so much more heavily censored than the British, he said), to an eventual admiration, at the front, for the heroism and humanity often shown by the enemy."

The Breton poet and activist Yann-Ber Kalloc'h, a former Catholic seminarian from the island of Groix near Lorient, was best known by his Bardic name of Bleimor. According to Ian Higgins, "When the war came, [Kalloc'h], like so many others, saw it as a defense of civilization and Christianity, and immediately volunteered for the front. 'Only Ireland and Brittany', he writes in one poem, 'still help Christ carry the cross: in the fight to reinvigorate Christianity, the Celtic peoples are in the van'. In addition, now readily fighting for France, he saw the war as the great chance to affirm the national identity of Brittany and resurrect its language and culture." Kalloc'h's last work was the poetry collection, Ar en Deulin, which was published posthumously. According to Jelle Krol, "It is not merely a collection of poems by a major Breton poet: it is a symbol of homage to Yann-Ber Kalloc'h and all those Bretons whose creative powers were cut short by their untimely deaths. Breton literature from the trenches is very rare. Only Yann-Ber Kalloc'h's poems, some war notes written by Auguste Bocher, the memoirs recounted by Ambroise Harel and Loeiz Herrieu's letters addressed to his wife survived the war."

=== Russia ===
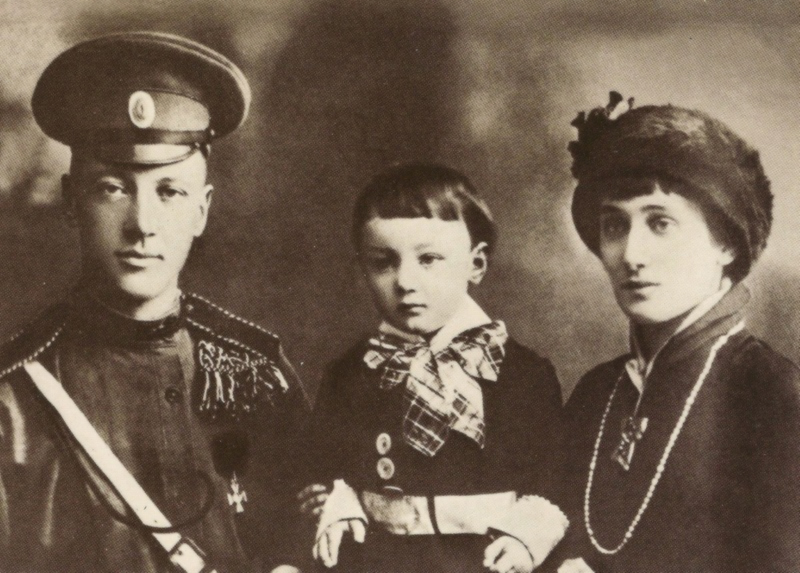
Nikolay Gumilyov, Anna Akhmatova and their son Lev Gumilev, in 1913

Russia also produced a number of significant war poets including Alexander Blok, Ilya Ehrenburg (who published war poems in his book "On the Eve"), and Nikolay Semenovich Tikhonov (who published the book Orda (The Horde) in 1922).

The Acmeist poet Nikolay Gumilyov served in the Imperial Russian Army during World War I. He saw combat in East Prussia, the Macedonian front, and with the Russian Expeditionary Force in France. He was also decorated twice with the Cross of St. George. Gumilyov's war poems were assembled in the collection The Quiver (1916).

Gumilyov's wife, the poet Anna Akhmatova, began writing poems during World War I that expressed the collective suffering of the Russian people as men were called up and the women in their lives bade them goodbye. For Akhmatova, writing such poems turned into her life's work and she continued writing similar poems about the suffering of the Russian people during the Bolshevik Revolution, the Russian Civil War, the Red Terror, and Joseph Stalin's Great Purge.

=== Australia ===
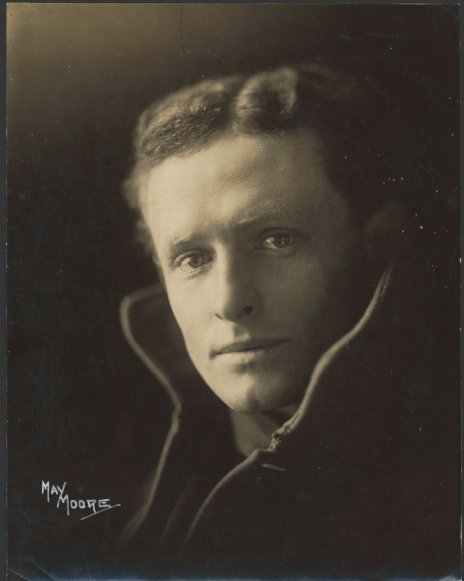
Leon Gellert (1894–1977)

Leon Gellert, an Australian poet of Hungarian descent, enlisted in the First Australian Imperial Force's 10th Battalion within weeks of the outbreak of war and sailed for Cairo on 22 October 1914. He landed at ANZAC Cove, during the Gallipoli Campaign on 25 April 1915, was wounded and repatriated as medically unfit in June 1916. He attempted to re-enlist but was soon found out. During periods of inactivity he had been indulging his appetite for writing poetry. Songs of a Campaign (1917) was his first published book of verse, and was favourably reviewed by The Bulletin. Angus & Robertson soon published a new edition, illustrated by Norman Lindsay. His second, The Isle of San (1919), also illustrated by Lindsay, was not so well received.

John O'Donnell served in the Australian Imperial Force during World War I. He arrived at Gallipoli on 25 April 1915 and later fought at the Battle of the Somme. In 1918 he was invalided back to Australia, during which time he wrote the last six poems of his only poetry collection, dealing with the war from the perspective of an Australian poet.

=== Canada ===
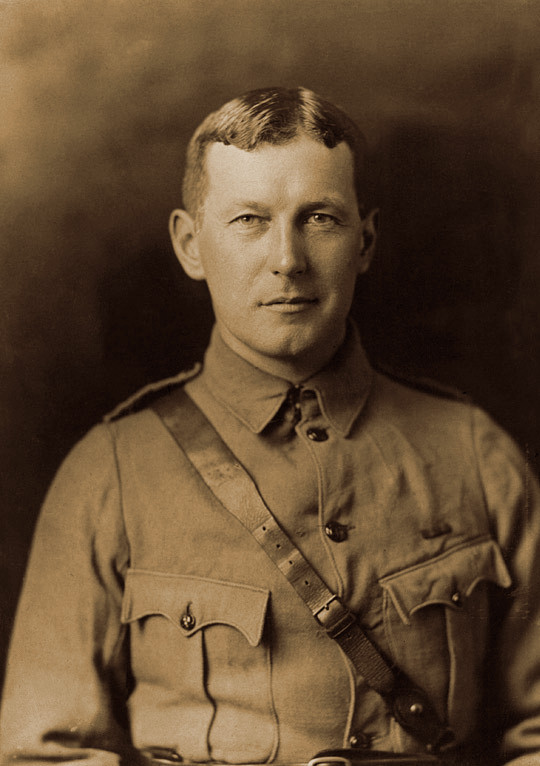
Lt.-Col. John McCrae (1872–1918)

John McCrae, a Scottish-Canadian poet and surgeon from Guelph, Ontario, joined the Canadian Expeditionary Force and was appointed as medical officer and major of the 1st Brigade CFA (Canadian Field Artillery). He treated the wounded during the Second Battle of Ypres in 1915, from a hastily dug, 8-by-8-foot (2.4 m × 2.4 m) bunker dug in the back of the dyke along the Yser Canal about 2 miles north of Ypres. McCrae's friend and former militia pal, Lt. Alexis Helmer, was killed in the battle, and his burial inspired the poem, In Flanders Fields, which was written on 3 May 1915, and first published in the magazine Punch. In Flanders Fields appeared anonymously in Punch on 8 December 1915, but in the index, to that year McCrae was named as the author. The verses swiftly became one of the most popular poems of the war, used in countless fund-raising campaigns and frequently translated. "In Flanders Fields" was also extensively printed in the United States, whose government was contemplating joining the war, alongside a 'reply' by R. W. Lillard, ("...Fear not that you have died for naught, / The torch ye threw to us we caught...").

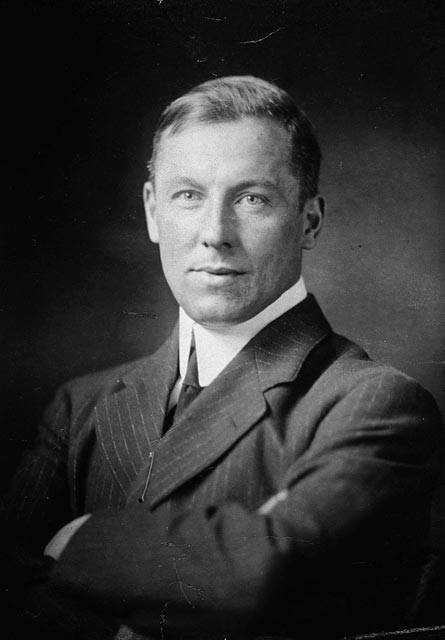
Robert W. Service (1874–1958)

Robert W. Service, an English-Canadian poet from Preston, Lancashire and who had already been dubbed, "The Canadian Kipling", was living in Paris when World War I broke out. Service was a war correspondent for the Toronto Star, but "was arrested and nearly executed in an outbreak of spy hysteria in Dunkirk." He then "worked as a stretcher bearer and ambulance driver with the Ambulance Corps of the American Red Cross, until his health broke." While recuperating in Paris, Service wrote a volume of war poems, Rhymes of a Red-Cross Man, which was published in Toronto in 1916. The book was dedicated to the memory of Service's "brother, Lieutenant Albert Service, Canadian Infantry, Killed in Action, France, August 1916." In 1926, Archibald MacMechan, professor of English at Dalhousie University in Halifax, Nova Scotia, published Headwaters of Canadian Literature, in which he praised Service's war poetry, writing, "his Rhymes of a Red Cross Man are an advance on his previous volumes. He has come into touch with the grimmest of realities; and while his radical faults have not been cured, his rude lines drive home the truth that he has seen."

In 1924, a poetic tribute to the Canadian Corps soldiers of the 85th Battalion (Nova Scotia Highlanders) was composed in Canadian Gaelic by Alasdair MacÌosaig of St. Andrew's Channel, Cape Breton, Nova Scotia. The poem praised the courage of the Battalion's fallen Canadian Gaels and told them that they had fought better against the Imperial German Army than the English did, while also lamenting the absence of fallen soldiers from their families and villages. The poem ended by denouncing the invasion of Belgium and vowing, even though Kaiser Wilhelm II had managed to evade prosecution by being granted political asylum in the neutral Netherlands, that he would one day be tried and hanged. The poem was first published in the Antigonish-based newspaper The Casket on 14 February 1924.

=== England ===
The major novelist and poet Thomas Hardy wrote a number of significant war poems that relate to the Napoleonic Wars, the Boer Wars and World War I, including "Drummer Hodge", "In Time of 'The Breaking of Nations", "The Man He Killed" and '"And there was a great calm" (on the signing of the Armistice, Nov.11, 1918)': his work had a profound influence on other war poets such as Rupert Brooke and Siegfried Sassoon. Hardy in these poems often used the viewpoint of ordinary soldiers and their colloquial speech. A theme in the Wessex Poems (1898) is the long shadow that the Napoleonic Wars cast over the 19th century, as seen, for example, in "The Sergeant's Song" and "Leipzig". The Napoleonic War is the subject of Hardy's drama in verse The Dynasts (1904–08).

At the beginning of World War I, like many other writers, Kipling wrote pamphlets and poems which enthusiastically supported the British war aims of restoring Belgium after that kingdom had been occupied by Germany together with more generalised statements that Britain was standing up for the cause of good.

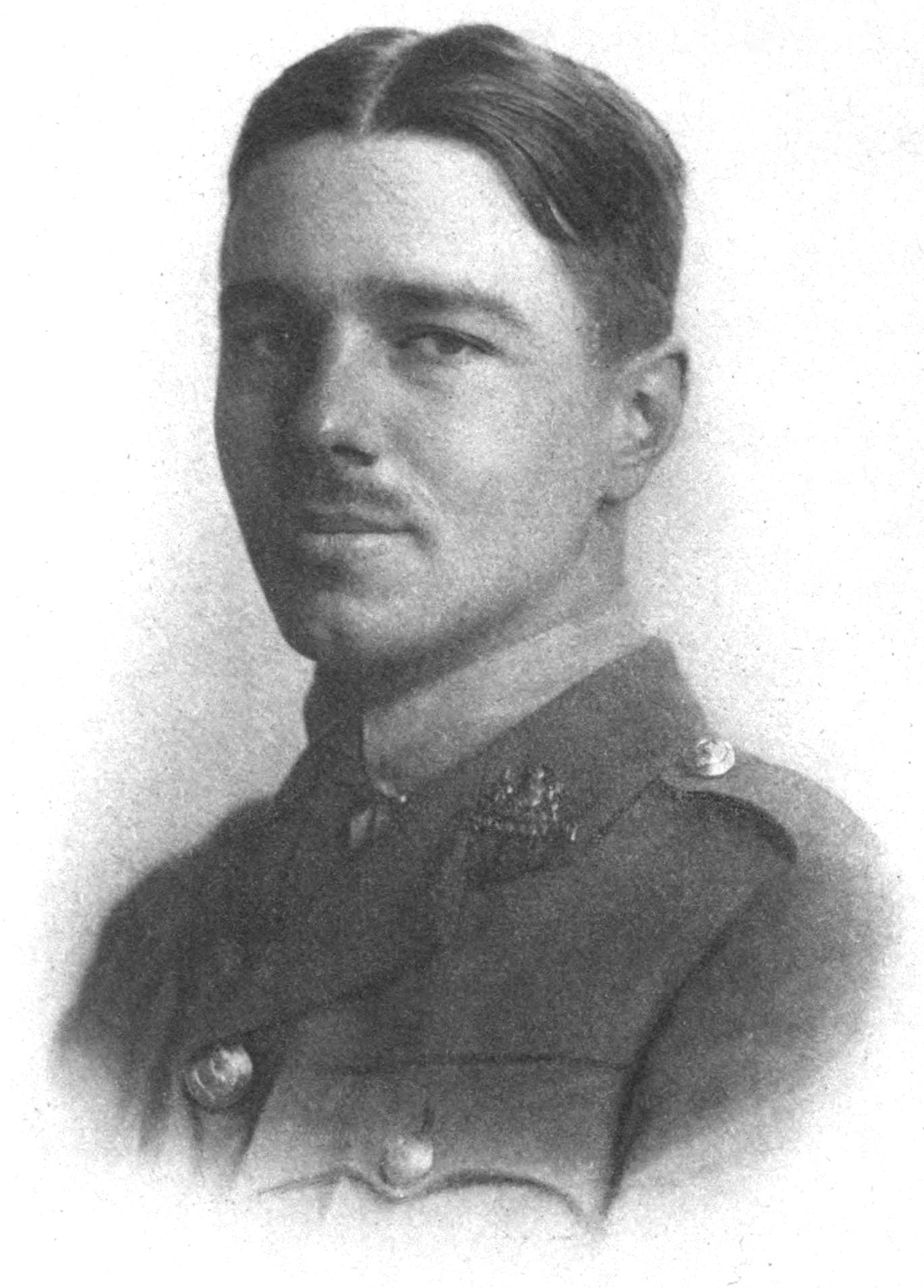
Wilfred Owen

For the first time, a substantial number of important British poets were soldiers, writing about their experiences of war. A number of them died on the battlefield, most famously Edward Thomas, Isaac Rosenberg, Wilfred Owen, and Charles Sorley. Others including Robert Graves, Ivor Gurney and Siegfried Sassoon survived but were scarred by their experiences, and this was reflected in their poetry. Robert H. Ross describes the British "war poets" as Georgian poets. Many poems by British war poets were published in newspapers and then collected in anthologies. Several of these early anthologies were published during the war and were very popular, though the tone of the poetry changed as the war progressed. One of the wartime anthologies, The Muse in Arms, was published in 1917, and several were published in the years following the war.

David Jones' epic poem of World War I In Parenthesis was first published in England in 1937, and is based on Jones's own experience as an infantryman in the War. In Parenthesis narrates the experiences of English Private John Ball in a mixed English-Welsh regiment starting with their leaving England and ending seven months later with the assault on Mametz Wood during the Battle of the Somme. The work employs a mixture of lyrical verse and prose, is highly allusive, and ranges in tone from formal to Cockney colloquial and military slang. The poem won the Hawthornden Prize and the admiration of writers such as W. B. Yeats and T. S. Eliot.

In November 1985, a slate memorial was unveiled in Poet's Corner commemorating 16 poets of the Great War: Richard Aldington, Laurence Binyon, Edmund Blunden, Rupert Brooke, Wilfrid Gibson, Robert Graves, Julian Grenfell, Ivor Gurney, David Jones, Robert Nichols, Wilfred Owen, Herbert Read, Isaac Rosenberg, Siegfried Sassoon, Charles Sorley and Edward Thomas.

=== Ireland ===
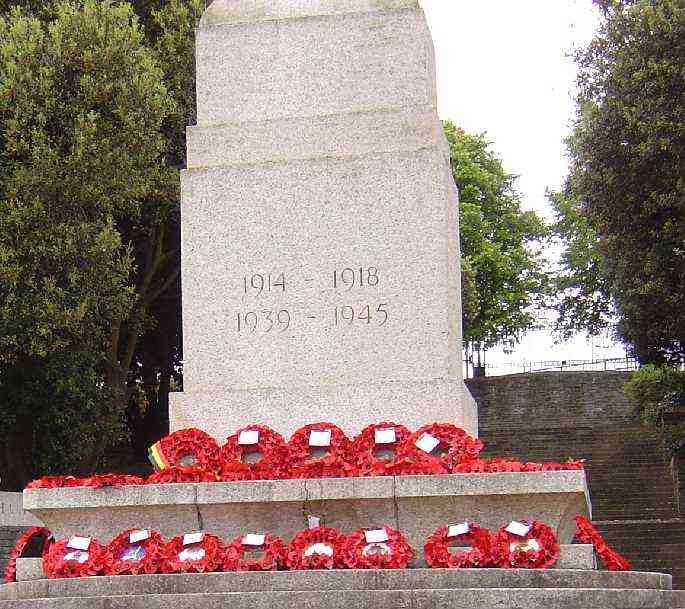
Great Cross above the Stone of Remembrance, with wreaths of commemoration, Irish National War Memorial Gardens, Dublin

The fact that 49,400 Irish soldiers in the British Army gave their lives fighting in the Great War remains controversial in Ireland. This is because the Easter Rising of 1916 took place during the war and the Irish War of Independence began only a few months after the 11 November Armistice. For this reason, Irish republicanism has traditionally viewed Irishmen who serve in the British military as traitors. This view became even more prevalent after 1949, when Ireland voted to become a Republic and to leave the Commonwealth. For this reason, Ireland's war poets were long neglected.

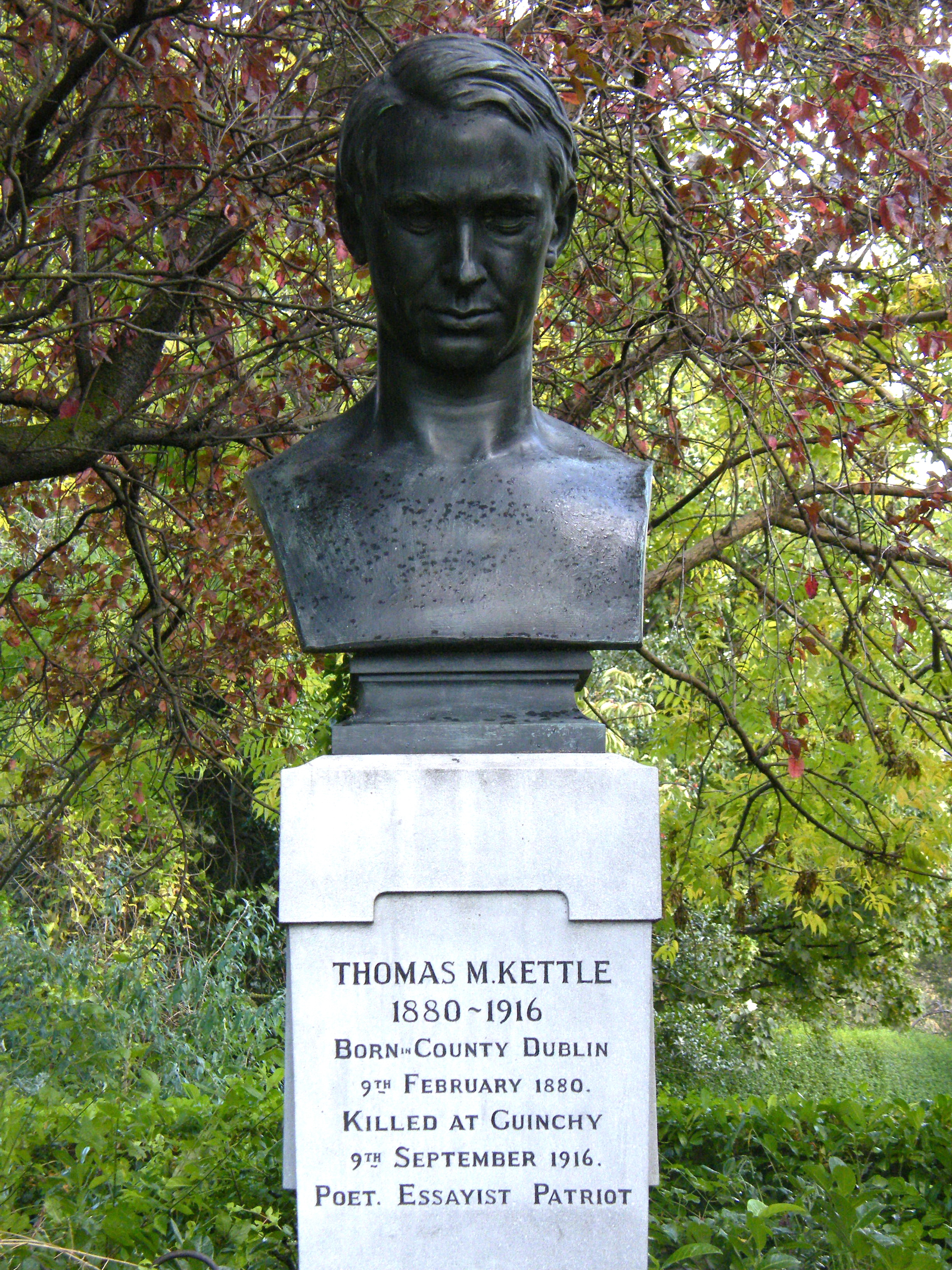
Thomas M. Kettle Memorial, St. Stephen's Green, Dublin, Ireland

One of them was Tom Kettle. Despite his outrage over the Rape of Belgium, Kettle was very critical of the war at first. Comparing the Anglo-Irish landlord class to the aristocratic big estate owners who similarly dominated the Kingdom of Prussia, Kettle wrote, "England goes to fight for liberty in Europe and for Junkerdom in Ireland." G. K. Chesterton later wrote, "Thomas Michael Kettle was perhaps the greatest example of that greatness of spirit which was so ill rewarded on both sides of the channel [...] He was a wit, a scholar, an orator, a man ambitious in all the arts of peace; and he fell fighting the barbarians because he was too good a European to use the barbarians against England, as England a hundred years before has used the barbarians against Ireland." Lieut. Kettle's best-known poem is a sonnet, To My Daughter Betty, the Gift of God, which was written and mailed to his family just days before he was killed in action.

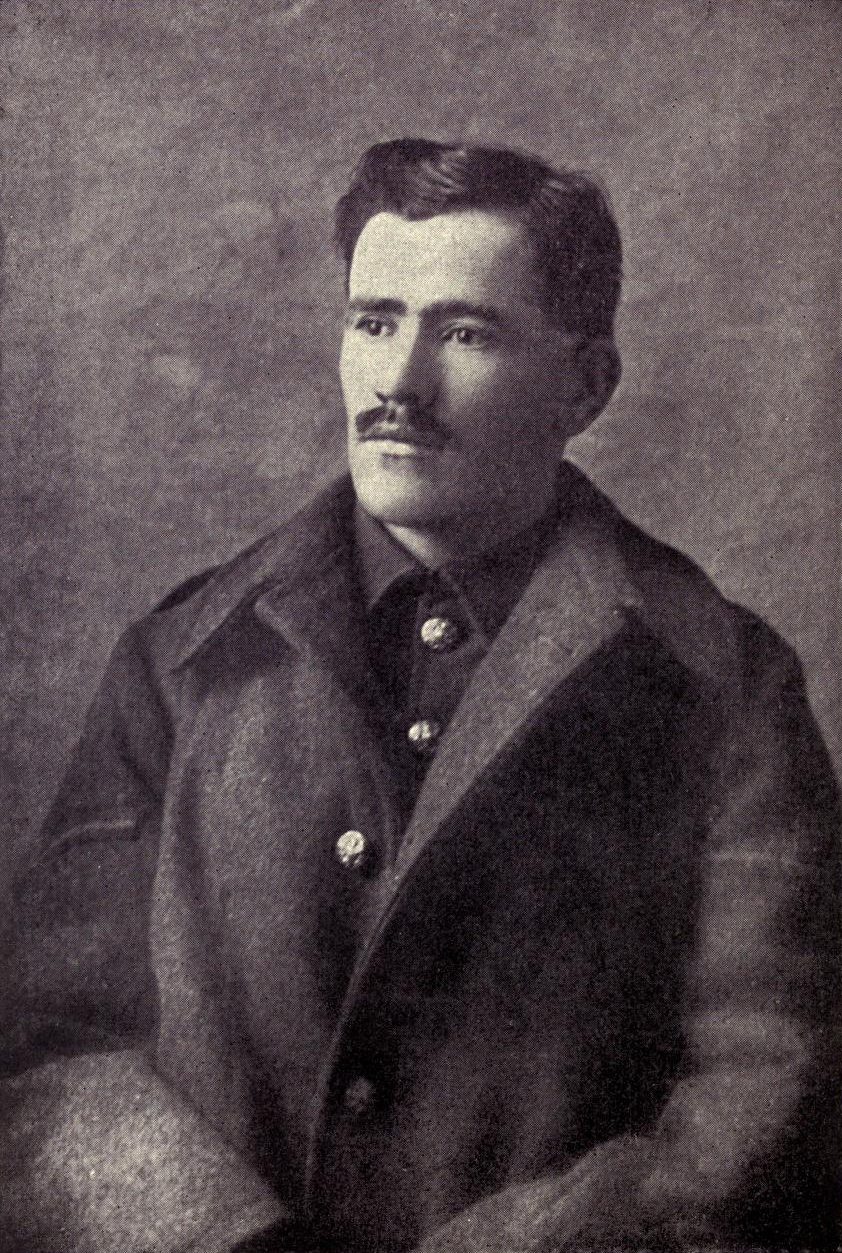
Francis Ledwidge in uniform

When Francis Ledwidge, who was a member of the Irish Volunteers in Slane, County Meath, learned of the outbreak of the war, he decided against enlisting in the British Army. In response, the Unionist National Volunteers subjected Ledwidge to a show trial, during which they accused him of cowardice and of being pro-German. Soon after, Ledwidge enlisted in the Royal Inniskilling Fusiliers. Despite his twin beliefs in socialism and Irish republicanism, Ledwidge later wrote, "I joined the British Army because she stood between Ireland and an enemy common to our civilisation and I would not have her say that she defended us while we did nothing at home but pass resolutions." Until his death at the Battle of Passchendaele in 1917, Ledwidge wrote the verses published in three volumes of poetry between 1916 and 1918, while he served at the Landing at Suvla Bay, on the Macedonian front and on the Western Front.

William Butler Yeats' first war poem was "On being asked for a War Poem" written on 6 February 1915, in response to a request from Henry James for a political poem about World War I. Yeats changed the poem's title from "To a friend who has asked me to sign his manifesto to the neutral nations" to "A Reason for Keeping Silent" before sending it in a letter to James, which Yeats wrote at Coole Park on 20 August 1915. When it was later reprinted the title was changed to "On being asked for a War Poem". Yeats' most famous war poem is An Irish Airman Foresees His Death, which is a soliloquy by Major Robert Gregory, an Irish nationalist flying ace who was also a friend of Yeats, and the son of Anglo-Irish landlord Sir William Henry Gregory and Yeats' patroness Lady Augusta Gregory. Wishing to show restraint from publishing a political poem during the height of the Great War, Yeats withheld publication of An Irish Airman Foresees His Death until after the 1918 Armistice.

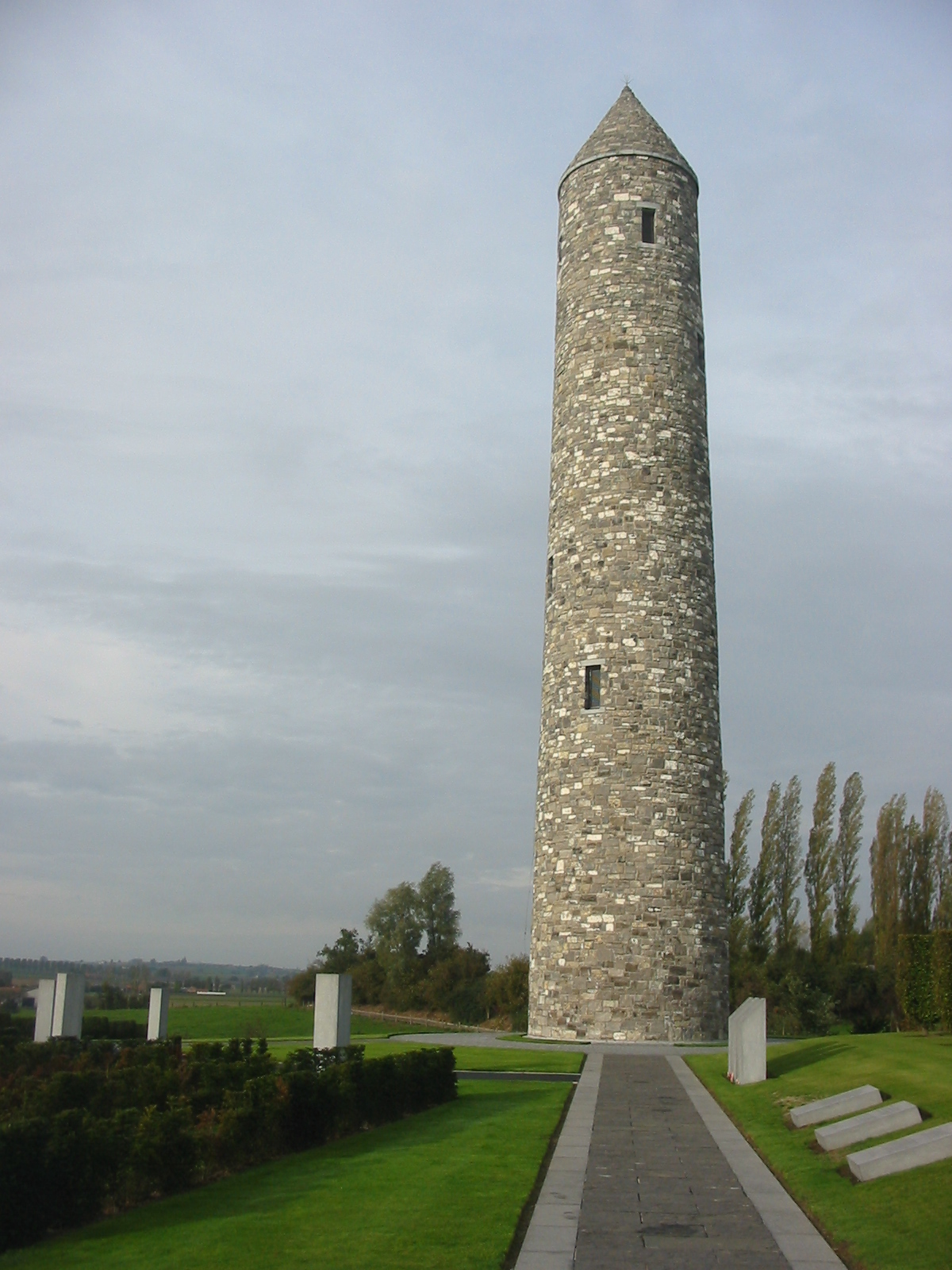
Symbolic Irish round tower at the Island of Ireland Peace Park, near the World War I battlefield at Messines Ridge, Belgium

"The Second Coming" is a poem written by Irish poet W. B. Yeats in 1919, in the aftermath of the First World War and at the beginning of the Irish War of Independence, which followed the Easter Rising of 1916, but before David Lloyd George and Winston Churchill sent the Black and Tans to Ireland. The poem uses Christian imagery regarding the Apocalypse, the Antichrist, and the Second Coming to allegorise the state of Europe during the Interwar Period.

=== Scotland ===
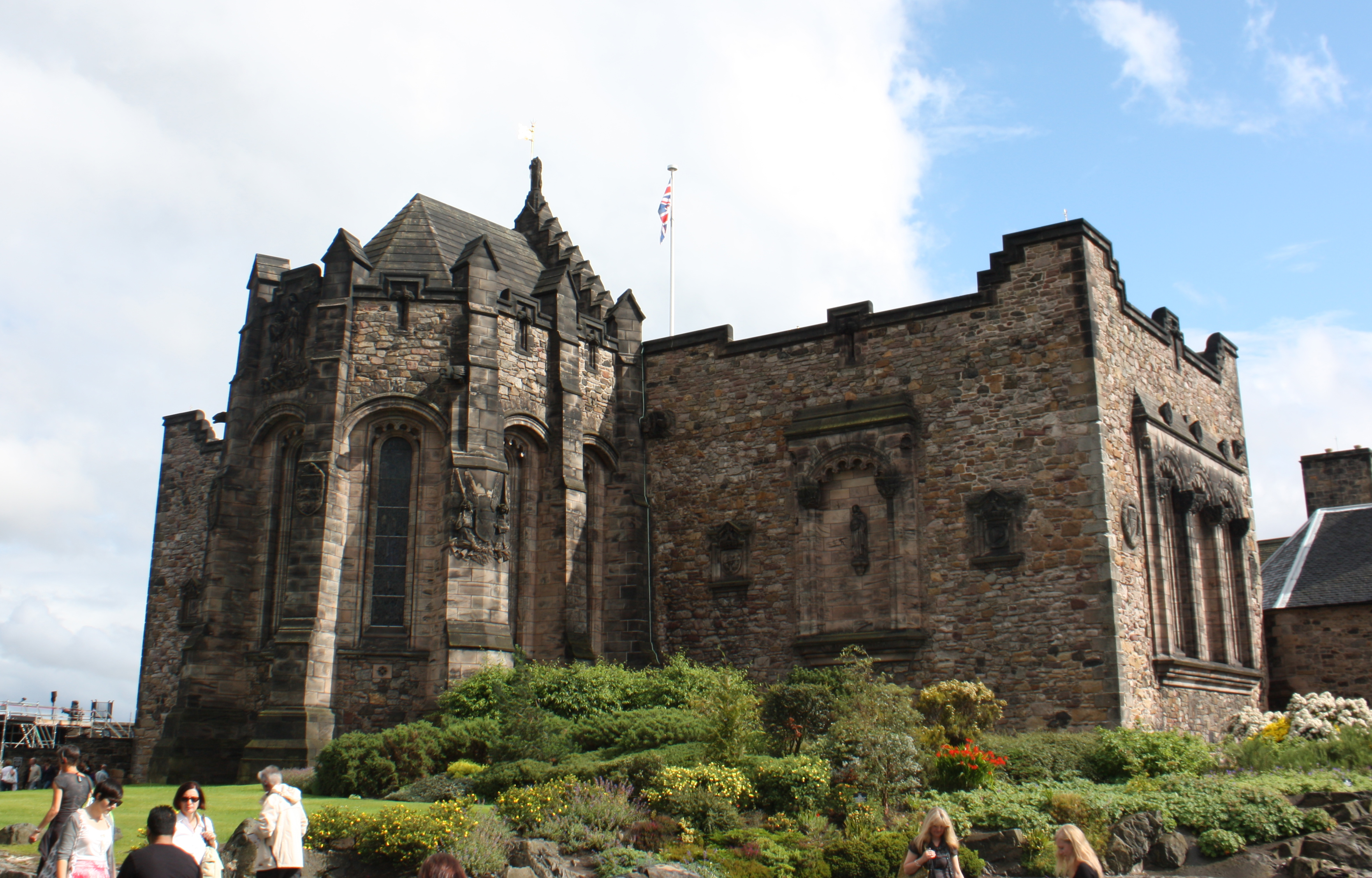
Scottish National War Memorial, Edinburgh

Even though its author died in 1905, Ronald Black has written that Fr. Allan MacDonald's Aisling poem Ceum nam Mìltean ("The March of Thousands"), which describes a vision of legions of young men marching away to a conflict from whence they will not return, deserves to be, "first in any anthology of the poetry of the First World War", and, "would not have been in any way out of place, with regard to style or substance", in Sorley MacLean's groundbreaking 1943 volume Dàin do Eimhir.

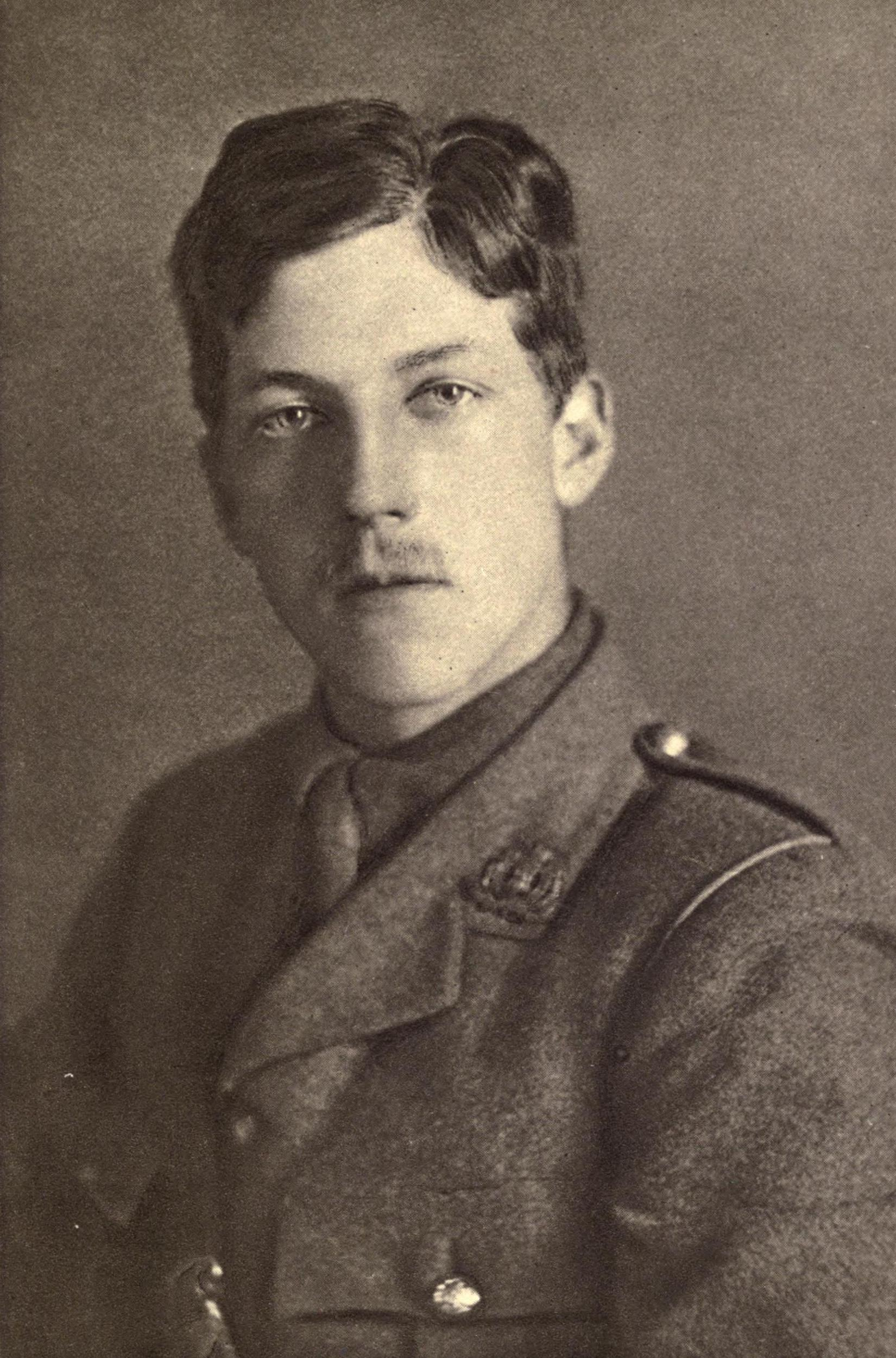
Charles Hamilton Sorley

In 1914, Scottish poet Charles Sorley, a native of Aberdeen, was living in Imperial Germany. After being briefly interned as an enemy alien at Trier and ordered to leave the country, Sorley returned to Great Britain and enlisted in the Suffolk Regiment as a lieutenant. He was killed by a German sniper during the Battle of Loos in 1915 and his poems and letters were published posthumously. Robert Graves described Charles Sorley in Goodbye to All That as "one of the three poets of importance killed during the war". (The other two being Isaac Rosenberg and Wilfred Owen.) Sorley believed that Germans and British were equally blind to each other's humanity and his anti-war poetry stands in direct contrast to the romantic idealism about the war that appears in the poems of Rupert Brooke, Walter Flex, and Alan Seeger.

The Scottish Gaelic poet John Munro, a native of Swordale on the Isle of Lewis, won the Military Cross while serving as a 2nd Lieutenant with the Seaforth Highlanders and was ultimately killed in action during the 1918 Spring Offensive. Lt. Munro, writing under the pseudonym Iain Rothach, came to be ranked by critics alongside the major war poets. Tragically, only three of his poems are known to survive. They are Ar Tir ("Our Land"), Ar Gaisgich a Thuit sna Blàir ("Our Heroes Who Fell in Battle"), and Air sgàth nan sonn ("For the Sake of the Warriors"). Derick Thomson – the venerable poet and Professor of Celtic Studies at Glasgow – hailed Munro as, "the first strong voice of the new Gaelic verse of the 20th century". Ronald Black has written that Munro's three poems leave behind, "his thoughts on his fallen comrades in tortured free verse full of reminiscence-of-rhyme; forty more years were to pass before free verse became widespread in Gaelic."

Pàdraig Moireasdan, a Scottish Gaelic bard and seanchaidh from Grimsay, North Uist, served in the Lovat Scouts during World War I. He served in the Gallipoli Campaign, in the Macedonian front, and on the Western Front. In later years, Moireasdan, who ultimately reached the rank of corporal, loved to tell how he fed countless starving Allied soldiers in Thessalonica by making a Quern-stone. Corporal Moireasdan composed many poems and songs during the war, including Òran don Chogadh (A Song to the War"), which he composed while serving at Gallipoli.

In 1969, Gairm, a publishing house based in Glasgow and specializing in Scottish Gaelic literature, posthumously published the first book of collected poems by Dòmhnall Ruadh Chorùna. The poet, who had died two years previously in the hospital at Lochmaddy on the island of North Uist, was a combat veteran of the King's Own Cameron Highlanders during World War I and highly talented poet in Gaelic. According to Ronald Black, "Dòmhnall Ruadh Chorùna is the outstanding Gaelic poet of the trenches. His best-known song An Eala Bhàn ("The White Swan") was produced there for home consumption, but in a remarkable series of ten other compositions he describes what it looked, felt, sounded and even smelt like to march up to the front, to lie awake on the eve of battle, to go over the top, to be gassed, to wear a mask, to be surrounded by the dead and dying remains of Gaelic-speaking comrades, and so on. Others of his compositions contain scenes of deer hunting, a symbolically traditional pursuit of which he happened to be passionately fond, and which he continued to practice all his life."

=== Wales ===
At the outbreak of World War I, the vast majority of the Welsh populace were against being involved in the war. Throughout World War I, voluntary enlistment by Welshmen remained low and conscription was ultimately enacted in Wales to ensure a steady supply of new recruits into the armed forces. The war particularly left Welsh non-conformist chapels deeply divided. Traditionally, the Nonconformists had not been comfortable at all with the idea of warfare. The war saw a major clash within Welsh Nonconformism between those who backed military service and those who adopted Christian pacifism.

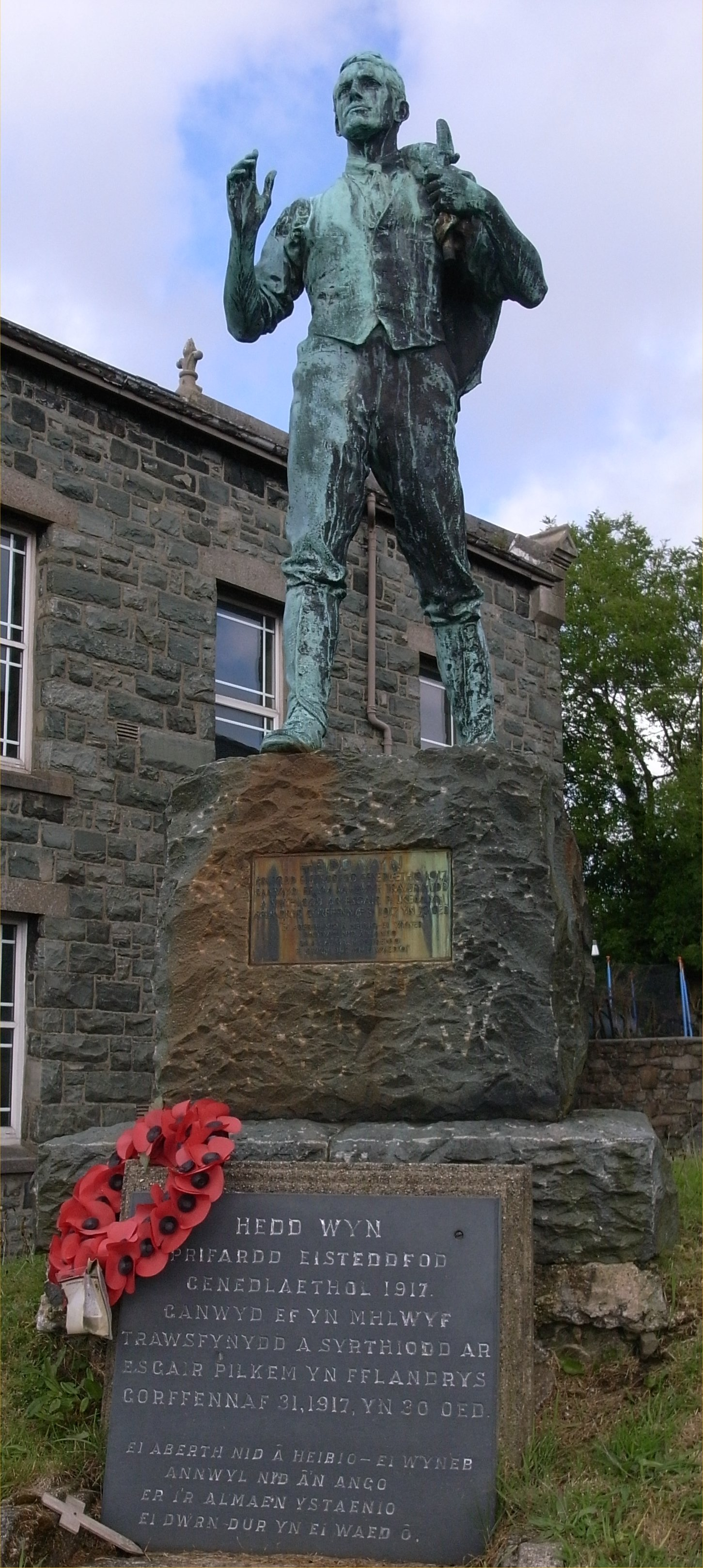
Statue of Hedd Wyn in his home village of Trawsfynydd

The most famous Welsh-language war poet remains Private Ellis Humphrey Evans of the Royal Welch Fusiliers, who is best known under his bardic name of Hedd Wyn. Evans wrote much of his poetry while working as a shepherd on his family's hill farm. His style, which was influenced by romantic poetry, was dominated by themes of nature and religion. He also wrote several war poems following the outbreak of war on the Western Front in 1914. Like many other Welsh nonconformists, Hedd Wyn was a Christian pacifist and refused to enlist in the armed forces, feeling that he could never kill anyone. The war, however, inspired some of Hedd Wyn's most noted poems, including Plant Trawsfynydd ("Children of Trawsfynydd"), Y Blotyn Du ("The Black Dot"), and Nid â'n Ango ("[It] Will Not Be Forgotten"). His poem, Rhyfel ("War"), remains one of his most frequently quoted works.

Albert Evans-Jones, a Welsh poet, served on the Salonica front and on the Western Front as a RAMC ambulance man and later as a military chaplain. After the war, he became a minister for the Presbyterian Church of Wales and wrote many poems that shocked the Welsh population with their graphic descriptions of the horrors of the trenches and their savage attacks on wartime ultra-nationalism. Also, in his work as Archdruid of the National Eisteddfod, Rev. Evans-Jones altered the traditional rituals, which were based in 18th century Celtic neopaganism, to better reflect the Christian beliefs of the Welsh people. Rev. Evans-Jones, whom Alan Llwyd considers the greatest Welsh poet of the Great War, is best known under the bardic name of Cynan. Welsh poet Alan Llwyd's English translations of many poems by both poets appear in the volume Out of the Fire of Hell; Welsh Experience of the Great War 1914–1918 in Prose and Verse.

=== United States ===
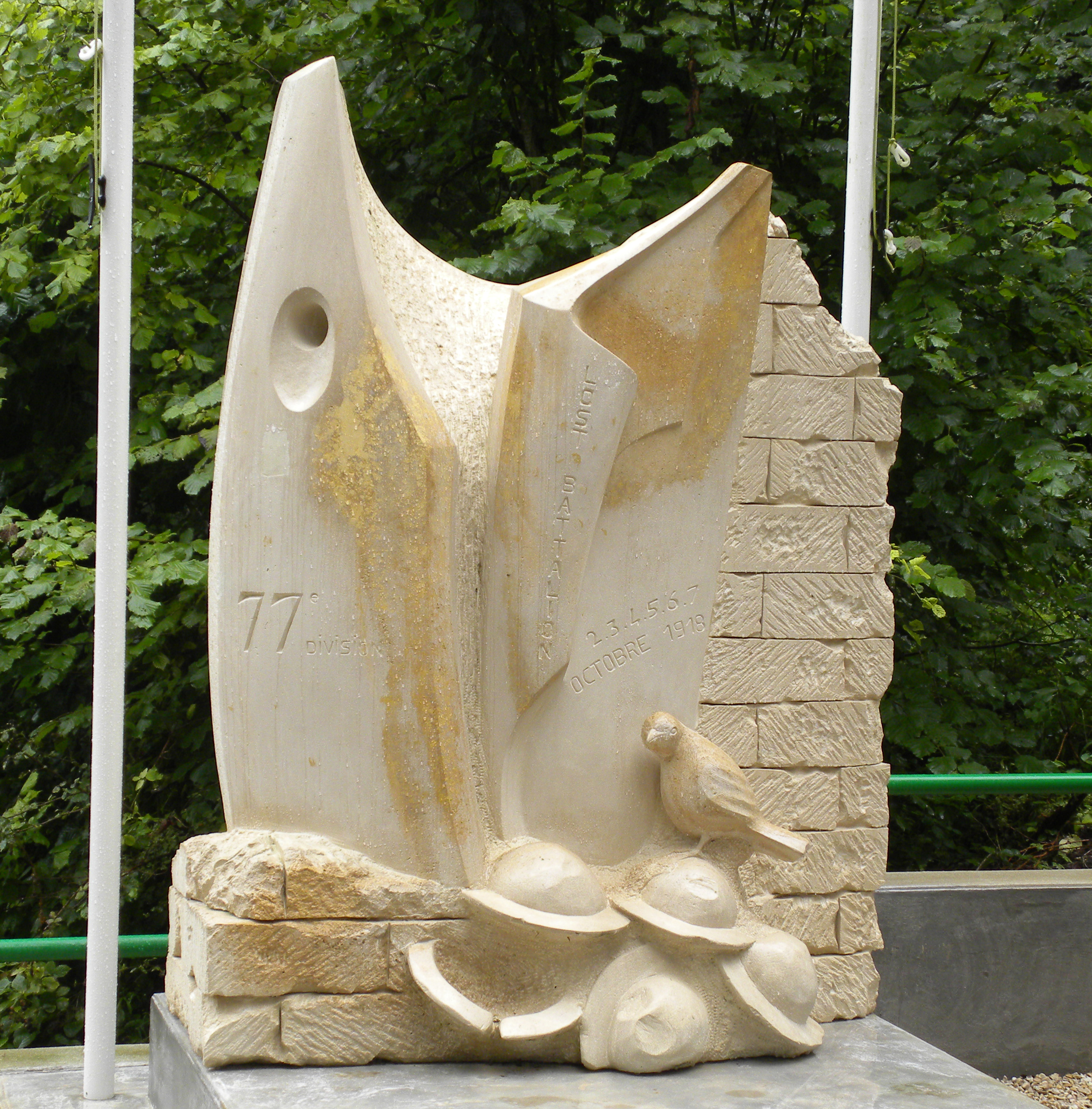
Monument to the Lost Battalion, Argonne Forest, France

Although World War I in American literature is widely believed to begin and end with Ernest Hemingway's war novel A Farewell to Arms, there were also American war poets.

Alan Seeger enlisted in the French Foreign Legion while America was still neutral and became the first great American poet of the First World War. Seeger's poems, which passionately urged the American people to join the Allied cause, were widely publicized and remained popular. According to former First Lady Jacqueline Kennedy, decades after Alan Seeger's death, his poem I Have a Rendezvous with Death, was a great favorite of her husband, U.S. President John Fitzgerald Kennedy, who often asked her to read it aloud to him.

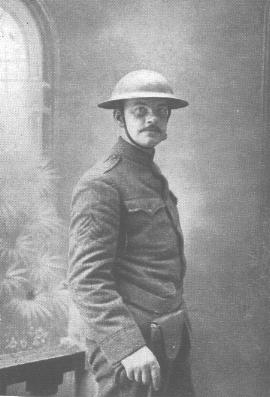
Sgt. Joyce Kilmer, as a member of the Fighting 69th Infantry Regiment, United States Army, c. 1918

Joyce Kilmer, who was widely considered America's leading Roman Catholic poet and apologist and who was often compared to G.K. Chesterton and Hilaire Belloc, enlisted mere days after the United States entered World War I. Before his departure, Kilmer had contracted with publishers to write a book about the war, deciding upon the title Here and There with the Fighting Sixty-Ninth. Kilmer never completed the book; however, toward the end of the year, he did find time to write prose sketches and war poetry. The most famous of Kilmer's war poems is "Rouge Bouquet" (1918) which commemorates the victims of a German artillery barrage against American trenches in the Rouge Bouquet forest, near Baccarat, on the afternoon of 7 March 1918. According to Dana Gioia, however, "None of Kilmer's wartime verses are read today; his reputation survives on poems written before he enlisted."

John Allen Wyeth, late 1970s

In 1928, American poet and World War I veteran of the A.E.F. John Allan Wyeth published This Man's Army: A War in Fifty-Odd Sonnets. B.J. Omanson recalls his first encounter with the collection, "Wyeth's sequence... was over fifty sonnets long and, reading through just a few of them at random, indicated that not only were they highly skilled, but unusually innovative as well. What was most exciting was that they were written, not in an elevated, formal tone, but in a cool, concise, dispassionate voice, spiced with slangy soldiers' dialogue, French villagers' patois, and filled with as many small particulars of life as any of the finest soldier-diaries I had read." The collection, which is written in an experimental form truly unique in the 800-year history of the sonnet, traces Wyeth's service as a 2nd Lieutenant and military intelligence officer.

Although This Man's Army was highly praised by American literary critics, with the onset of the Great Depression, Wyeth's poetry was forgotten. According to B.J. Omanson and Dana Gioia, who rescued Wyeth's poetry from oblivion during the early 21st century, Wyeth is the only American poet of the First World War who can withstand comparison with English war poets Siegfried Sassoon, Isaac Rosenberg, and Wilfred Owen. B.J. Omanson has also found that every event that Wyeth relates in his sonnets, down to the way he describes the weather, can be verified by other eyewitness accounts as completely accurate. In response to the 2008 re-publication of The Man's Army, British literary critic Jon Stallworthy, the editor of The Oxford Book of War Poetry and the biographer of Wilfred Owen, wrote, "At long last, marking the ninetieth anniversary of the Armistice, an American poet takes his place in the front rank of the War Poet's parade." Inspired by Canadian poet John McCrae's famous poem In Flanders Fields, American poet Moina Michael resolved at the war's conclusion in 1918 to wear a red poppy year-round to honour the millions of soldiers who had died in the Great War. She also wrote a poem in response called We Shall Keep the Faith.

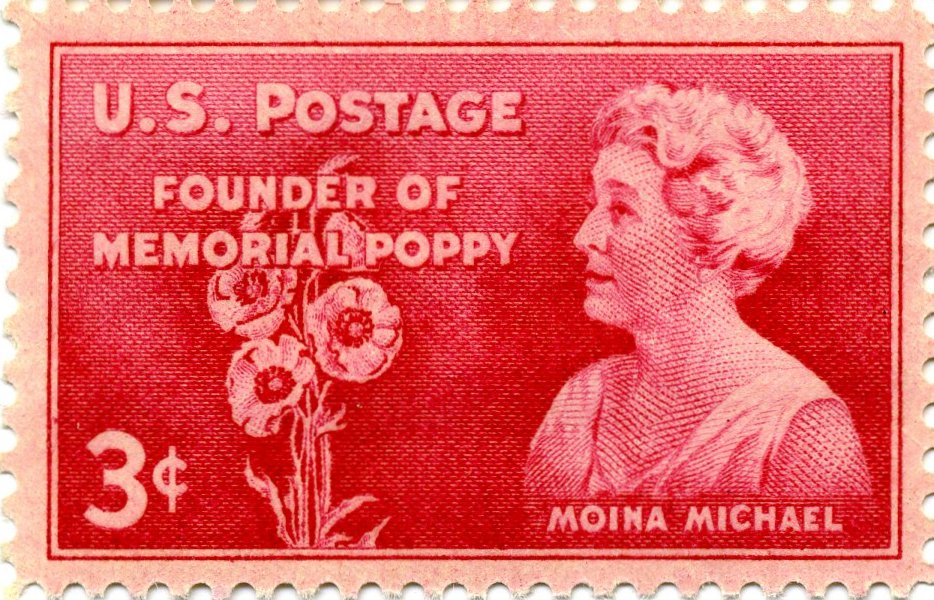
Moina Michael on a U.S. postage stamp. Michael first proposed using poppies as a symbol of remembrance.

== Russian Civil War ==
During the Russian Civil War, the Russian Symbolist poet Vyacheslav Ivanov wrote the sonnet sequence "Poems for a Time of Troubles."

Between 1917 and 1922, Russian poet Marina Tsvetaeva, whose husband Sergei Efron was serving as an officer in the anti-communist Volunteer Army, wrote the epic verse cycle Lebedinyi stan (The Encampment of the Swans) about the civil war, glorifying the anti-communist soldiers of the White Movement. The cycle of poems is in the style of a diary or journal and begins on the day of Tsar Nicholas II's abdication in March 1917, and ends late in 1920, when the Whites had been completely defeated. The 'swans' of the title refers to the volunteer soldiers of the White Army. In 1922, Tsvetaeva also published a lengthy monarchist fairy tale in verse, Tsar-devitsa ("Tsar-Maiden").

On the other side, Osip Mandelstam wrote many poems praising the Red Army and rebuking the Whites, whom he referred to in one poem as, "October's withered leaves." However, Mandelstam, who believed deeply in the tradition that poets are the conscience of the Russian people, died in the Gulag in 1938, after being arrested for composing an epigram that both attacked and mocked Stalin.

== Spanish Civil War ==
The Spanish Civil War produced a substantial volume of poetry in English (as well as in Spanish). There were English-speaking poets serving in the Spanish Civil War on both sides. Among those fighting with the Republicans as volunteers in the International Brigades were Clive Branson, John Cornford, Charles Donnelly, Alex McDade and Tom Wintringham.

On the Nationalist side, the most famous English-language poet of the Spanish Civil War remains South African poet Roy Campbell. As a recent convert to the Roman Catholic Church, Campbell was horrified to witness the violent religious persecution of Catholics as part of the wider Red Terror ordered by the Pro-Soviet leadership of Republican forces. A particularly chilling moment for Campbell was when he came across the bodies of Toledo's Carmelite monks, whom he had befriended, after Republican forces had subjected them to execution without trial. The monks' executioners had then written in blood above their bodies, "Thus strikes the CHEKA." Campbell later retold the execution in his poem The Carmelites of Toledo and finished the same poem by pointing out the role that local massacres of Roman Catholic priests, laity, and religious orders played in causing the city's Spanish Army garrison to join Francisco Franco's mutiny against the Second Spanish Republic and to repeatedly refuse to surrender during the Siege of the Alcázar. Of Campbell's other poems about the War, the best are the sonnets Hot Rifles, Christ in Uniform, The Alcazar Mined, and Toledo 1936. According to Campbell's biographer, Joseph Pearce, and his daughters Anna and Tess, Campbell's pro-Nationalist stance has caused him, in an early version of cancel culture, to be inaccurately labeled as a Fascist and left out of poetry anthologies and college courses.

In Afrikaans literature, the best poet of the Spanish Civil War is Campbell's close friend Uys Krige, who campaigned just as passionately for the Republican faction. In Roy Campbell's 1952 memoir, Light on a Dark Horse, he explains Uys Krige's Republican sympathies by the latter being, "an incurable Calvinist." In 1937, Krige wrote the Afrikaans poem, Lied van die fascistiese bomwerpers ("Hymn of the Fascist Bombers"). Krige later recalled, "I needed only a line or two, then the poem wrote itself. My hand could hardly keep pace. I did not have to correct anything. Well... that seldom happens to you." The poem condemned the bombing raids by pro-Nationalist Luftwaffe pilots of the Condor Legion. Inspired, according to Jack Cope, by Krige's upbringing within Afrikaner Calvinism and its traditional hostility to an allegedly corrupt Pre-Reformation Church, Lied van die fascistiese bomwerpers also leveled savage attacks against Roman Catholicism.

According to Jack Cope, "The poem starts on a note of military pride - the eyes of the Fascist pilots fixed on themselves in their joyful and triumphant, their holy task. The tone of bitter irony rises as the pace becomes faster, climbing to height after height of savagery and contempt. The lines of the Latin liturgy become mixed with the brutal exultation of the mercenaries raining down death from their safe altitude. The Bible itself is rolled in the blood. The lovely place-names of Spain rise in gleams above the dust and smoke. In the end the hymn becomes an insane scream of violence and bloody destruction mocking even the Crucifixion." As no Afrikaans journal dared to publish it, Uys Krige's Lied van die fascistiese bomwerpers appeared in the Forum, a Left-leaning literary journal published in English. Krige's poem elicited vehement condemnations from both extreme Afrikaner nationalists and from the Catholic Church in South Africa, which "protested vehemently" called Krige's poem sacrilegious.

The best Spanish-language poets of the Civil War are Republican poet Federico García Lorca, Carlist poet José María Hinojosa Lasarte, and the Machado brothers. Antonio Machado wrote a poem to honor the Communist General Enrique Líster, and died a refugee in France after the defeat of the Republic. Meanwhile, his brother, Manuel Machado, dedicated a poem to the saber of the Nationalist Generalissimo Francisco Franco.

== World War II ==
=== Poland ===
Poland's war, both in conventional and guerrilla warfare, continued to inspire poetry long after all fighting had ceased. Czesław Miłosz has since written, "Before World War II, Polish poets did not differ much in their interests and problems from their colleagues in France and Holland. The specific features of Polish literature notwithstanding, Poland belonged to the same cultural circuit as other European countries. Thus one can say that what occurred in Poland was the encounter of a European poet with the hell of the twentieth century, not hell's first circle, but a much deeper one. This situation is something of a laboratory, in other words: it allows us to examine what happens to modern poetry in certain historical conditions."

After SS General Jürgen Stroop suppressed the Warsaw Ghetto Uprising in 1943, anti-Nazi Polish poet Czesław Miłosz wrote the poem Campo dei Fiore. In the poem, Miłosz compared the burning of the Ghetto and its 60,0000 inhabitants to the burning at the stake of Giordano Bruno by the Roman Inquisition in 1600. Miłosz criticized the Polish people for just going on with their daily routines while the Ghetto was burning. He ended by urging his listeners and readers to feel outraged over the Holocaust in Poland and to join the Polish Resistance in their fight against the Nazi Occupiers.

Also in response to the Warsaw Ghetto Uprising, poet Hirsh Glick, who was imprisoned in the Vilna Ghetto, wrote the Yiddish poem Zog Nit Keynmol, in which he urged his fellow Jews to take up arms against Nazi Germany. Despite Glick's own murder by the SS in 1944, Zog Nit Keynmol was set to music and widely adopted by Jewish partisans as an anthem of resistance against the Holocaust.

In 1974, Anna Świrszczyńska published the poetry collection Budowałam barykadę ("Building the Barricade"), about her experiences as both a combatant and battlefield nurse during the 1944 Warsaw Uprising. Czesław Miłosz later wrote about Świrszczyńska, "In August and September of 1944, she took part in the Warsaw Uprising. For sixty-three days she witnessed and participated in a battle waged by a city of one million people against tanks, planes, and heavy artillery... Many years later, Świrszczyńska tried to reconstruct that tragedy in her poems: the building of barricades, the basement hospitals, the bombed houses caving in burying the people in shelters, the lack of ammunition, food, and bandages, and her own adventures as a military nurse. Yet these attempts of hers did not succeed: they were too wordy, too pathetic, and she destroyed her manuscripts. (Also, for a long time the Uprising was a forbidden topic, in view of Russia's role in crushing it). No less than thirty years after the event did she hit upon a style that satisfied her. Curiously enough, that was the style of miniature, which she had discovered in her youth, but this time not applied to paintings. Her book Building the Barricades consists of very short poems, without meter or rhyme, each one a microreport on a single incident or situation."

=== Hungary ===
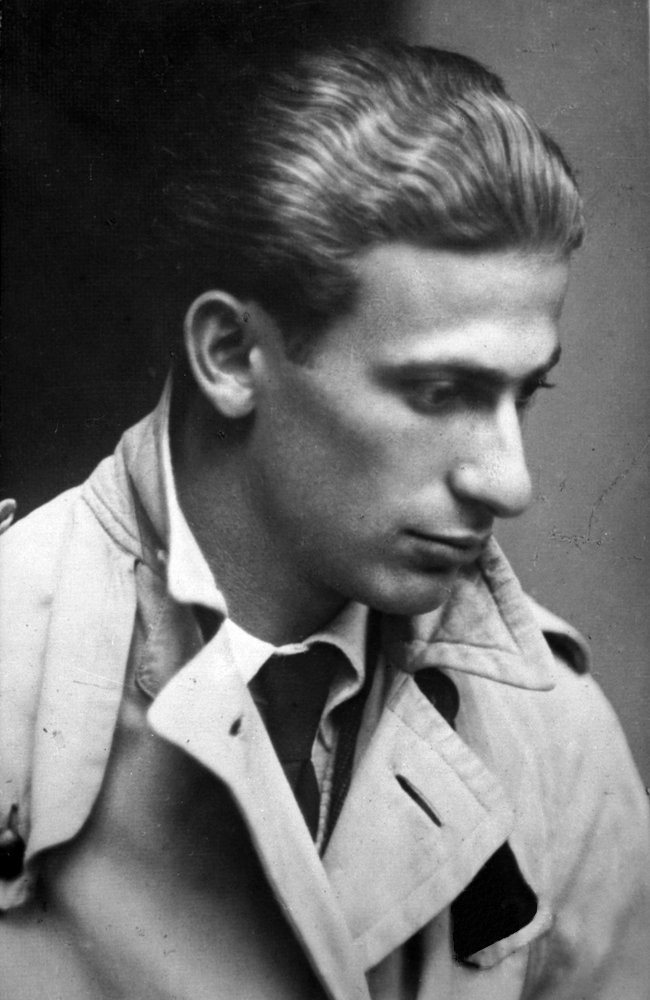
Miklós Radnóti, c. 1930

Hungarian Jewish poet and Roman Catholic convert Miklós Radnóti was a vocal critic of the Pro-German Governments of Admiral Miklós Horthy and of the Arrow Cross Party. According to Radnóti's English translator Frederick Turner, "One day, one of Radnóti's friends saw him on the streets of Budapest, and the poet was mumbling something like, 'Du-duh-du-duh-du-duh,' and his friend said, 'Don't you understand?! Hitler is invading Poland!' And Radnóti supposedly answered, 'Yes, but this is the only thing I have to fight with.' As his poetry makes clear, Radnóti believed that Fascism was the destruction of order. It both destroyed and vulgarized civil society. It was as if you wanted to create an ideal cat, so you took your cat, killed it, removed its flesh, put it into some kind of mold, and then pressed it into the shape of a cat. That's what Fascism does, and that's what Communism does. They both destroy an intricate social order to set up a criminally simple-minded order."

=== Soviet Union ===
During World War II, Anna Akhmatova witnessed the 900-day Siege of Leningrad and read her poems over the radio to encourage the city's defenders. In 1940, Akhmatova started her Poem without a Hero, finishing a first draft in Tashkent, but working on "The Poem" for twenty years and considering it to be the major work of her life, dedicating it to "the memory of its first audience – my friends and fellow citizens who perished in Leningrad during the siege".

In the 1974 poem Prussian Nights, Soviet dissident Alexander Solzhenitsyn, a former captain in the Red Army during World War II, graphically describes Soviet war crimes in East Prussia. The narrator, a Red Army officer, approves of his troops' looting and rapes against German civilians as revenge for German war crimes in the Soviet Union and he hopes to take part in the atrocities himself. The poem describes the gang-rape of a Polish woman whom the Red Army soldiers had mistaken for a German. According to a review for The New York Times, Solzhenitsyn wrote the poem in trochaic tetrameter, "in imitation of, and argument with the most famous Russian war poem, Aleksandr Tvardovsky's Vasili Tyorkin."

=== Serbia ===
Amongst Serbian poets during World War II, the most notable is Desanka Maksimović. She is well known for "Krvava bajka" or "A Bloody Fairy Tale". The poem is about a group of schoolchildren in Occupied Yugoslavia who fall victim to the 1941 Wehrmacht war crime known as the Kragujevac massacre.

=== Finland ===
Yrjö Jylhä published a poetry collection in 1951 about the Winter War, in which Finland fought against Joseph Stalin and the invading Red Army. The name of the collection was Kiirastuli (Purgatory).

=== Canada ===
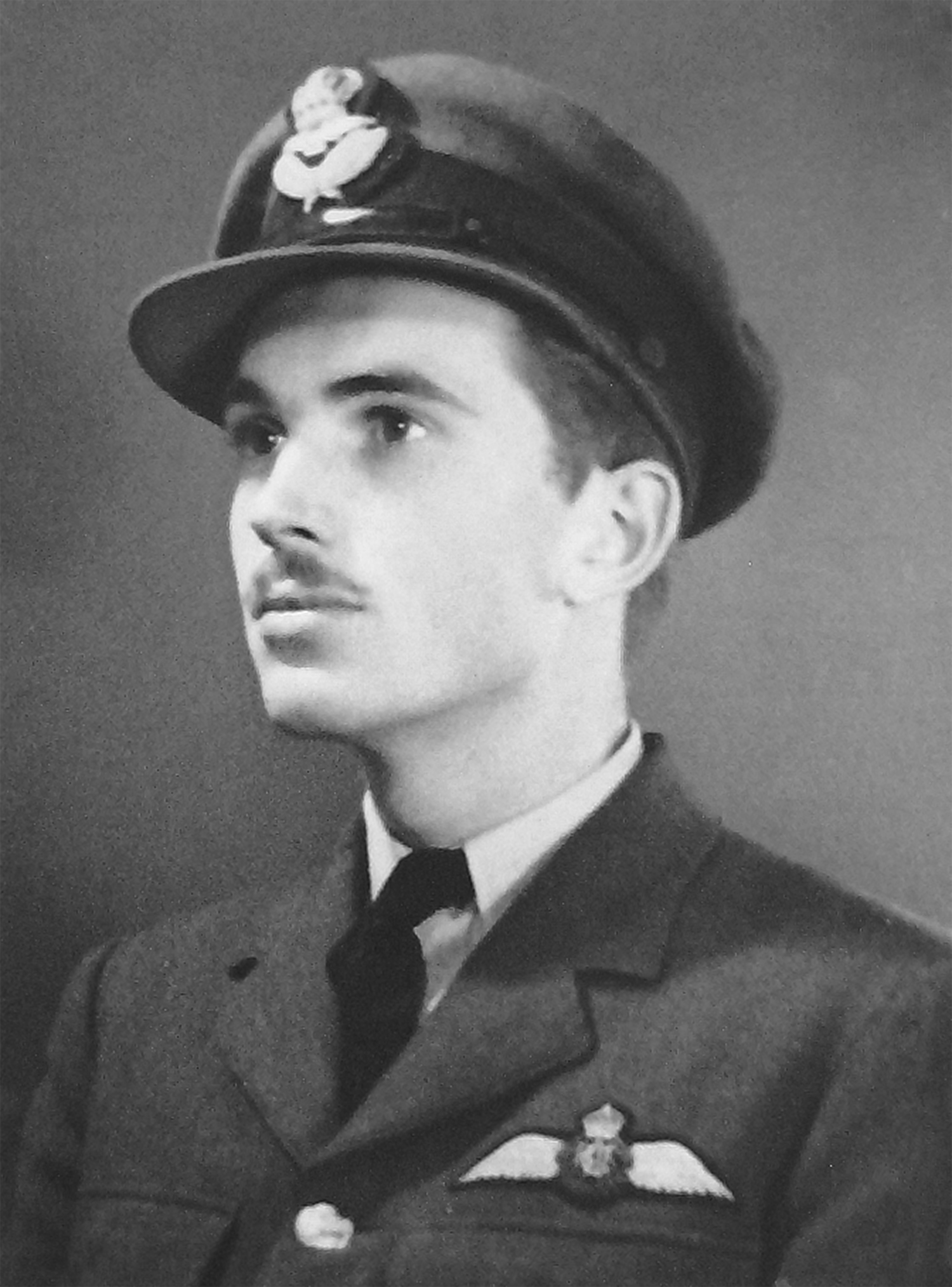
Official Royal Canadian Air Force picture of Pilot Officer John Gillespie Magee, Jr.

One of the most famous World War II poets in both Canadian and American poetry is John Gillespie Magee Jr., an American fighter pilot who had volunteered to fly for the Royal Canadian Air Force before America entered the Second World War. Gillespie wrote the iconic and oft-quoted sonnet High Flight, a few months before his death in an accidental collision over Ruskington, Lincolnshire, on 11 December 1941. Originally published in the Pittsburgh Post-Gazette, High Flight was widely distributed after Pilot Officer Magee became one of the first post-Pearl Harbor American citizens to die in the Second World War. Since 1941, Pilot Officer Maher's sonnet has been featured prominently in aviation memorials across the world, including that for the 1986 Space Shuttle Challenger disaster.

=== England ===
By World War II the role of "war poet" was so well-established in the public mind, and it was anticipated that the outbreak of war in 1939 would produce a literary response equal to that of the First World War. The Times Literary Supplement went so far as to pose the question in 1940: "Where are the war-poets?" Alun Lewis and Keith Douglas are the standard critical choices amongst British war poets of this time. In 1942, Henry Reed published a collection of three poems about British infantry training entitled Lessons of the War; three more were added after the war. Sidney Keyes was another important and prolific Second World War poet.

=== Ireland ===
Despite Ireland's neutrality, the events and atrocities of that war did inspire Irish poetry as well.

In his 1964 poetry collection Lux aeterna, Eoghan Ó Tuairisc, an Irish-language poet from Ballinasloe, County Galway, included a long poem inspired by the Atomic bombings of Hiroshima and Nagasaki, entitled Aifreann na marbh ("Mass for the Dead"). The poem is an imitation of the Roman Catholic Requiem Mass, "with the significant omission of 'Credo' and 'Gloria.'" According to Louis De Paor, "In the course of the poem, the glories of Irish and European civilisation, of art, literature, science, commerce, philosophy, language, and religion are interrogated and found incapable of providing a meaningful response to the apparently unlimited human capacity for destruction. In the month of Lúnasa, the Pagan Celtic God of light, on the Christian feast day of the Transfiguration, Dé Luain (Monday) becomes Lá an Luain (Doomsday), as the destructive light of atomic annihilation replaces the natural light of the sun. The poem also draws on early Irish literature to articulate Ó Tuairisc's idea that the poet has a responsibility to intercede in the eternal struggle between love and violence through the unifying, healing, power of creative imagination. While everyone is culpable in the annihilation of Hiroshima, the poet, the word-priest, bears a particular burden of responsibility."

=== New Zealand ===
New Zealand's war poets include H. W. Gretton, whose poem Koru and Acanthus is a notable work in the genre. His war diary, made whilst serving with the 2NZEF in Italy, is also an important social-historical document.

=== Scotland ===
Hamish Henderson a Scottish poet from Blairgowrie, Perthshire, served as an officer in the British Army Intelligence Corps during the North African Campaign. During his service, Henderson collected the lyrics to "D-Day Dodgers," a satirical song to the tune of "Lili Marlene", attributed to Lance-Sergeant Harry Pynn, who had served in Italy. Henderson also wrote the lyrics to The 51st (Highland) Division's Farewell to Sicily, set to a pipe tune called "Farewell to the Creeks". The book in which these were collected, Ballads of World War II, was published "privately" to evade censorship, but still earned Henderson a ten-year ban from BBC radio. Henderson's 1948 poetry book about his experiences in the war, Elegies for the Dead in Cyrenaica, received the Somerset Maugham Award.

Scottish Gaelic poet Duncan Livingstone, a native of the Isle of Mull who had lived in Pretoria, South Africa, since 1903, published several poems in Gaelic about the war. They included an account of the Battle of the River Plate and also an imitation of Sìleas na Ceapaich's early 18th-century lament, Alasdair a Gleanna Garadh, in honor of Livingstone's nephew, Pilot Officer Alasdair Ferguson Bruce of the Royal Air Force, who was shot down and killed during a mission over Nazi Germany in 1941.

Scottish Gaelic poet Sorley MacLean was also a soldier poet who wrote about his combat experiences with the Royal Corps of Signals during the Western Desert campaign. MacLean's most famous Gaelic war poem is Glac a' Bhàis ("The Valley of Death"), which relates his thoughts on seeing a dead German soldier in North Africa. In the poem, MacLean ponders what role the dead man may have played in Nazi atrocities against both German Jews and members of the Communist Party of Germany. MacLean concludes, however, by saying that whatever the German soldier may or may not have done, he showed no pleasure in his death upon Ruweisat Ridge.

Upon the outbreak of the Second World War in September 1939, North Uist war poet Dòmhnall Ruadh Chorùna composed the poem Òran dhan Dara Chogaidh ("A Song for World War II"). In the poem, Dòmhnall urged the young Scottish Gaels who were going off to fight to not be afraid and that victory over Adolf Hitler and Nazi Germany would come by October 1939. On 16 November 1939, the British merchant ship S.S. Arlington Court was torpedoed and sunk in the Atlantic Ocean by the German submarine U-43. In his poem Calum Moireasdan an Arlington Court ("Calum Morrison of the Arlington Court"), Dòmhnall paid tribute to the courage shown by one of the survivors, a seventeen-year-old Gaelic-speaking merchant seaman from Calbost on the Isle of Lewis. Morrison had been the only survivor in his lifeboat who had known how to sail and had managed to pilot their lifeboat eastwards for five days, until he and his fellow survivors were rescued at the mouth of the English Channel. Also during the Second World War, Dòmhnall served in the Home Guard, about which he composed the song Òran a' Home Guard ("The Song of the Home Guard"), which pokes fun at an exercise in which a platoon from North Uist was ordered to simulate taking the airfield at Benbecula from the invading Wehrmacht. At the same time, Dòmhnall's son Calum MacDonald served in the Merchant navy, and regularly sailed within sight of North Uist on his travels between the port of Glasgow and the United States. With this in mind, the Bard composed the poem Am Fianais Uibhist ("In Sight of Uist").

Aonghas Caimbeul, a Scottish Gaelic poet, served with the Seaforth Highlanders. In his award-winning memoir Suathadh ri Iomadh Rubha, Caimbeul recalled the origins of his poem, Deargadan Phòland ("The Fleas of Poland"), "We called them the Freiceadan Dubh ('Black Watch'), and any man they didn't reduce to cursing and swearing deserved a place in the courts of the saints. I made a satirical poem about them at the time, but that didn't take the strength out of their frames or the sharpness out of their sting." Caimbeul composed other poems during his captivity, including Smuaintean am Braighdeanas am Pòland, 1944 ("Thoughts on Bondage in Poland, 1944").

Calum MacNeacail, a Scottish Gaelic poet, served in the Royal Air Force during the Second World War. In his 1946 poem Cùmhnantan Sìthe Pharis ("The Paris Peace Treaties"), MacNeacail praised the atomic bombings of Hiroshima and Nagasaki and threatened the same fate against Joseph Stalin and Vyacheslav Molotov if the continued refusing to cooperate with the Western Allies.

=== South Africa ===
In South African poetry in English, Roy Campbell wrote several poems in favor of the Allied cause during the Second World War. In one of them, Campbell expressed his elation and pride at seeing the Royal Navy aircraft carrier HMS Ark Royal being towed into Gibraltar for repairs following combat.

In Afrikaans literature, the main war poet of the Second World War is, like in the Spanish Civil War, Uys Krige. Uys Krige served as a war correspondent with the South African Army during the Abyssinian Campaign and the North African Campaign. Krige's collection Oorlogsgedigte ("War Poems"), was published in 1942.

=== Wales ===
Anglo-Welsh poet Alun Lewis remains one of the most well-known English-language poets of the Second World War. His first published book was the collection of poetry Raider's Dawn and other poems (1942). Lewis' poems about his war experiences have been described as showing "his brooding over his army experiences and trying to catch and hold some vision that would illuminate its desolation with meaning" (see Ian Hamilton "Alun Lewis Selected Poetry and Prose)

Anglo-Welsh poet Dylan Thomas also wrote about the victims of Luftwaffe bombs during the Battle of Britain and about The Holocaust in his poem A Refusal to Mourn the Death, by Fire, of a Child in London.

=== United States ===
Although the Second World War is not usually thought of as a poet's war, there were American war poets.

In an interview for the documentary The Muse of Fire, U.S. Poet Laureate Richard Wilbur commented that there was a great difference between the war poets of World War I and those, like himself, who wrote and served during World War II. Wilbur explained that, unlike Siegfried Sassoon and Wilfred Owen, American World War II poets believed themselves to be fighting a just war and that Nazi Germany, Fascist Italy, and Imperial Japan were terrible enemies which needed to be confronted and destroyed. He did add that many World War II poets, including himself, felt sympathy for the plight of conscientious objectors.

After being thrown out of signals training and busted back to the ranks for expressing sympathy for the Communist Party of the United States of America, Richard Wilbur was shipped overseas as an enlisted man and served in the European theatre. During his war service with the 36th U.S. Division and over the decades that followed, Richard Wilbur wrote many war poems. One of Wilbur's best-known war poems is Tywater, about the combat death in Italy of Corporal Lloyd Tywater. Another famous war poem by Richard Wilbur is First Snow in Alsace, which lyrically describes the horrors of a recent battlefield in Occupied France being covered up by the beautiful sight of new-fallen snow.

Anthony Hecht, an American poet of German Jewish ancestry, served in the European Theater as a G.I. with the 97th U.S. Infantry Division. Decades later, Hecht sought treatment for PTSD and used his war experiences as the subject of many of his poems.

American poet Dunstan Thompson, a native of New London, Connecticut, began publishing his poems while serving as a soldier in the European Theater during World War II. Thompson's poems depict military service through the eyes of a homosexual, who is engaged in casual encounters with soldiers and sailors in Blitzed London.

Karl Shapiro, a stylish writer with a commendable regard for his craft, wrote poetry in the Pacific Theater while he served there during World War II. His collection V-Letter and Other Poems was awarded the Pulitzer Prize for Poetry in 1945, while Shapiro was still in the military. Shapiro was American Poet Laureate in 1946 and 1947. (At the time this title was consultant in poetry to the Library of Congress, which was changed by Congress in 1985 to Poet Laureate Consultant in Poetry to the Library of Congress.).

Also, while serving in the U.S. Army, the American poet Randall Jarrell published his second book of poems, Little Friend, Little Friend (1945) based on his wartime experiences. The book includes one of Jarrell's best-known war poems, "The Death of the Ball Turret Gunner." In his follow-up book, Losses (1948), he also focused on the war. The poet Robert Lowell stated publicly that he thought Jarrell had written "the best poetry in English about the Second World War."

=== Romania ===
The Romanian-born poet Paul Celan wrote war poetry including "Todesfuge" (translated into English as "Death Fugue", and "Fugue of Death",) a German poem written by probably around 1945 and first published in 1948. It is "among Celan's most well-known and often-anthologized poems". The is regarded as a "masterful description of horror and death in a concentration camp". Celan was born to a Jewish family in Cernauti, Romania; his parents were murdered during the Holocaust, and Celan himself was a prisoner for a time in a concentration camp.

=== Japan ===
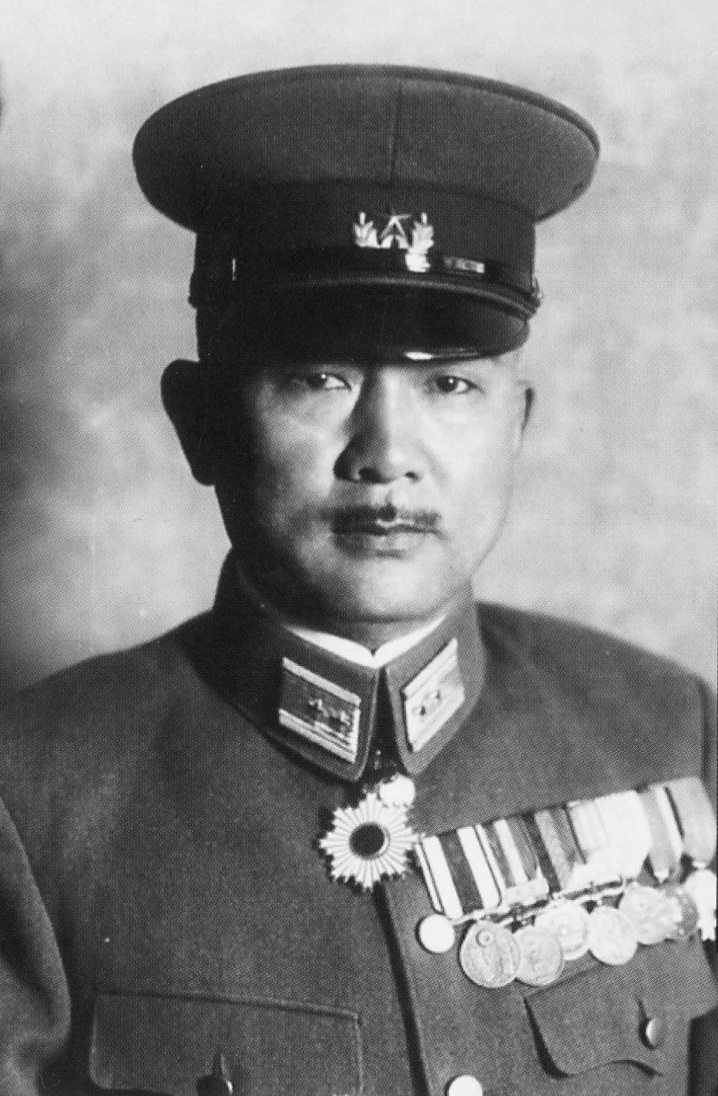
General Tadamichi Kuribayashi

Ryuichi Tamura who served in the Imperial Japanese Navy during World War II is a major Japanese war poet. Following the war, he "helped begin a poetry magazine, The Waste Land" and those poets who contributed to it were "the Waste Land Poets." The work of these writers was especially influenced by T. S. Eliot, Stephen Spender, C. Day-Lewis and W. H. Auden. Tamura's first book of poems, Four Thousand Days and Nights was published in 1956.

Sadako Kurihara was living in Hiroshima on 6 August 1945, and it was then "that her life was transformed from being a shopkeeper to becoming one of Japan's most controversial poets. Her first major collection of poems, Black Eggs, published in 1946", but it was heavily censored by the American Occupation Forces Censor, because of how she dealt with the horrors following the dropping of the atomic bombs on Japan. Kurihara has also "taken a stand on" the many Japanese war crimes that were committed during the occupation of China, "the mistreatment of Koreans in Japan, and the need for a world-wide ban on nuclear weapons".

General Tadamichi Kuribayashi was the overall commander of the Japanese forces during the Battle of Iwo Jima. On 17 March 1945, the General sent his farewell message to Imperial Headquarters accompanied by three traditional death poems in waka form. Both were, according to historian Kumiko Kakehashi, "a subtle protest against the military command that so casually sent men out to die." The poems and the message were heavily rewritten by Japanese military censors before being published and all anti-war sentiments were removed. Instead of describing the General and his soldiers as feeling "sad" to fall in battle, Japanese censors rewrote the poem to say that they died in Banzai charges. The uncensored text of both the message and the poems were only published after the Surrender of Japan.

== Later wars ==
=== Korean War ===
The Korean War inspired the war poetry of Rolando Hinojosa, a Mexican-American poet from Mercedes, Texas, and of William Wantling.

On 28 March 1956, when BBC Scotland played a recording of a Scottish Gaelic language ceilidh by the soldiers of the King's Own Cameron Highlanders during the Korean War, Dòmhnall Ruadh Chorùna, who had served in the same regiment during World War I, was listening. He later composed the poem Gillean Chorea ("The Lads in Korea"), in which he declared that the recording had brought back his youth. In his poem Òran an H-Bomb ("The Song of the H-Bomb"), he commented on the hydrogen bomb.

=== Vietnam War ===
The Vietnam War also produced war poets, including Armenian-American poet Michael Casey whose début collection, Obscenities, drew on his service with the Military Police Corps in the Quảng Ngãi Province of South Vietnam. The book won the 1972 Yale Younger Poets Award.

W. D. Ehrhart, a United States Marine Corps Sergeant who won the Purple Heart in the Battle of Huế during the Tet Offensive, has since been dubbed "the Dean of Vietnam War poetry."

At the height of the Vietnam War in 1967, American poet Richard Wilbur composed A Miltonic Sonnet for Mr. Johnson on His Refusal of Peter Hurd's Official Portrait.

Rob Jacques, a Vietnam-Era United States Navy veteran, has explored the tension between love and violence in war from the perspective of homosexual servicemen in his collection, War Poet, published by Sibling Rivalry Press.

Yusef Komunyakaa (formerly James Willie Brown, Jr.) served in the United States Army during the Vietnam War as an editor for the military newspaper Southern Cross. He has since used his war experiences as the source of his poetry collections Toys in a Field (1986) and Dien Cau Dau (1988).

Another poet of the Vietnam War is Bruce Weigl.

=== War on Terror ===
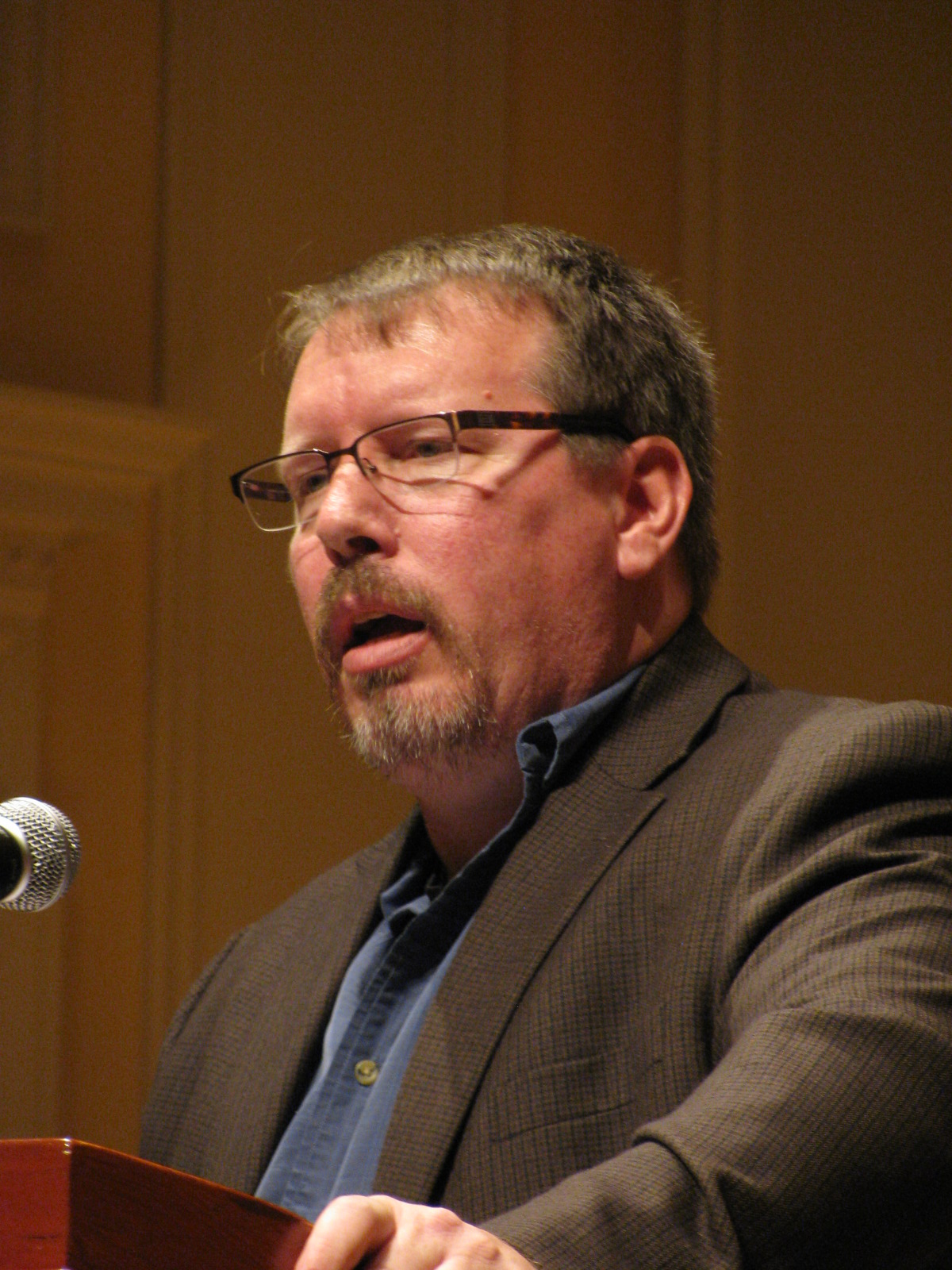
Iraq War poet Brian Turner

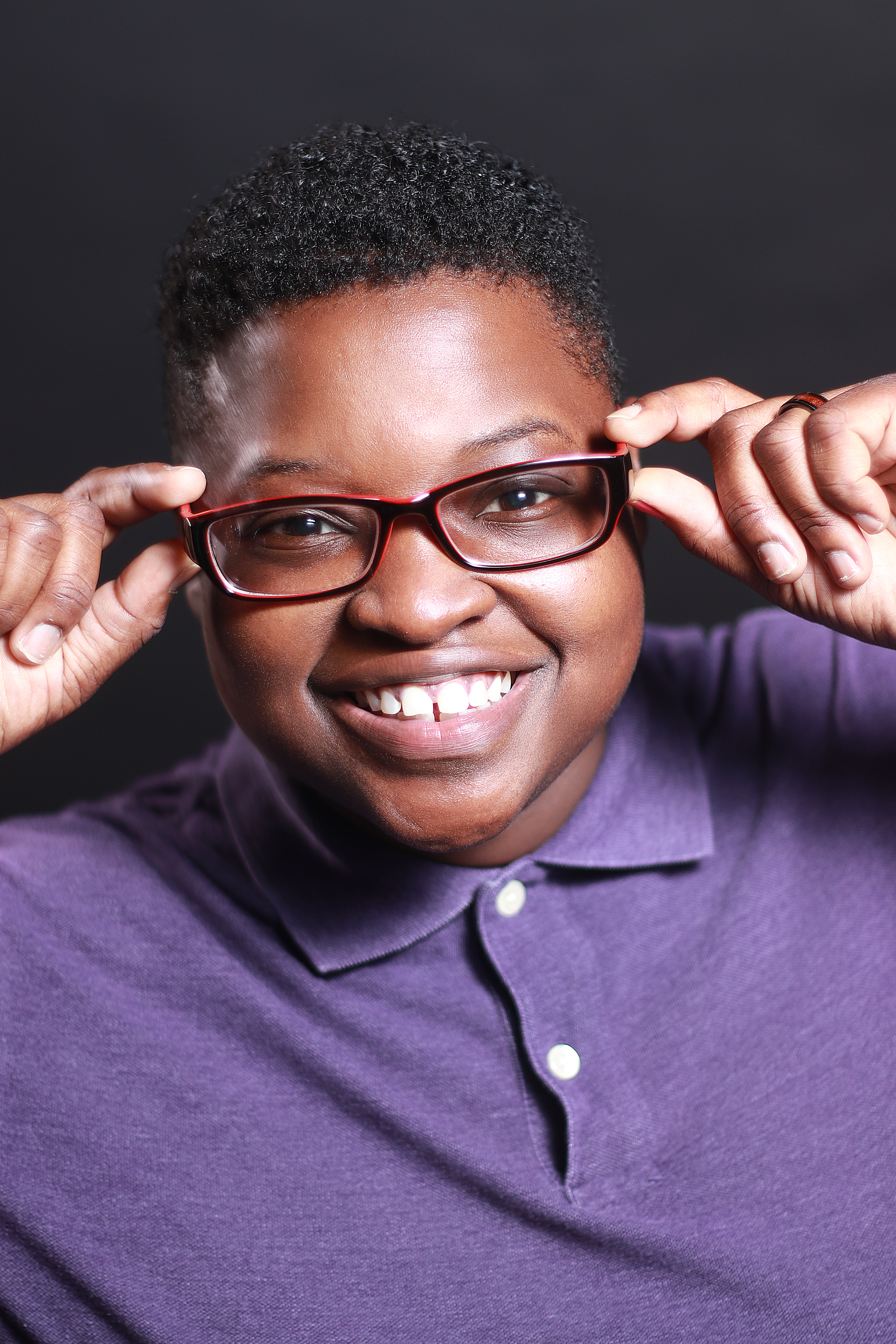
Operation Iraqi Freedom poet Erika Renee Land

The Iraq War has produced war poets including Brian Turner whose début collection, Here, Bullet, is based on his experience as an infantry team leader with the 3rd Stryker Brigade Combat Team. The book won numerous awards including the 2005 Beatrice Hawley Award, the 2006 Maine Literary Award in Poetry, and the 2006 Northern California Book Award in Poetry. In The New Yorker, Dana Goodyear wrote that, "As a war poet, [Brian Turner] sidesteps the classic distinction between romance and irony, opting instead for the surreal."

Erika Renee Land is an American 21st-century war poet, 2021MacDowell Fellow and author, who served in Mosul, Iraq from 2005 to 2006. She has published two poetry collections that chronicle her experiences.

=== Russia's invasion of Ukraine (2022–present) ===
The 2022 full-scale invasion of Ukraine has sparked a significant literary response, with war poetry emerging as a powerful form of resistance, remembrance, and reflection. Ukrainian poets have turned to verse to process trauma, confront violence, and express national and personal identity during wartime. A widely cited collection is Words for War: New Poems from Ukraine, edited by Oksana Maksymchuk and Max Rosochinsky, which gathers contemporary Ukrainian poetry in English translation. Contributing poets include Serhiy Zhadan, Iya Kiva, Lyuba Yakimchuk, and Halyna Kruk, whose works explore themes of loss, displacement, and endurance.

Among notable individual voices is Marianna Kiyanovska, whose poems have appeared in English translation in international outlets. Her work has been praised for its emotional clarity and evocation of lived wartime experience.

Poets outside Ukraine have also responded to the invasion. UK Poet Laureate Simon Armitage published the poem Resistance in March 2022, describing the courage and symbolism of the sunflower as a national and poetic motif.

This imagery is also central to the newsletter Sunflowers in the Blood, curated by poet and writer Tate Ellis on Substack. The collection features original poetry, guest contributions, and translations that examine themes of war, memory, and resilience through the lens of contemporary digital publishing.

Academic and institutional support for translated Ukrainian war poetry continues to grow. In 2023, the University of Exeter highlighted new translation initiatives aimed at bringing these poetic voices to English-speaking audiences, reinforcing the cultural and testimonial role of poetry during armed conflict.
