= Wet Wet Wet discography =

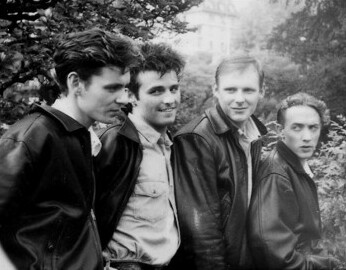
- Wet Wet Wet at the Montreux Pop Festival in Montreux, Switzerland
- Studio albums: 7
- Live albums: 3
- Compilation albums: 6
- Singles: 33
- Miscellaneous: 1

This is the discography of Scottish soft rock band Wet Wet Wet consists of seven studio albums, six compilation albums, three live albums and thirty-three singles. They released their debut album, Popped In Souled Out in September 1987, which spawned the commercially success singles "Wishing I Was Lucky", "Sweet Little Mystery", "Angel Eyes (Home and Away)" and "Temptation". The album peaked at number one on the UK Albums Charts, and earned a 5x Platinum certification from the British Phonographic Industry (BPI) for sales in excess of 1.5 million copies. Their second album was released two years later in 1989, Holding Back the River, which was supported by the lead single "Sweet Surrender" which was certified Gold by the Australian Recording Industry Association (ARIA) where it reached the top ten of the ARIA Charts, as well as in the United Kingdom, the Netherlands and Ireland.

Their third album, High on the Happy Side, was released in January 1992, followed by their fourth, Picture This (1995). The laters lead single, "Love Is All Around" became an international success, spending fifteen weeks atop the UK Singles Charts, becoming one of the longest chart reigns of all time. It reached number one in their native Scotland, as well as in other territories including Norway, New Zealand, Australia, Finland and Iceland. It sold an estimated 1.9 million copies in the United Kingdom, earning a triple Platinum certification from the BPI. Their fifth album, 10, was released in 1997, and marked the beginning of a ten year hiatus for the band before returning with their sixth studio album, Timeless, in 2007.

== Albums ==
=== Studio albums ===
Year	Album details	Peak chart positions										Certifications
Year	Album details	UK	AUS	AUT	GER	NL	NZ	NOR	SWE	SWI	US	Certifications
1987	Popped In Souled Out: Released: 21 September 1987; Label: Mercury; Formats: CD, cassette, LP	1	60	—	44	12	6	—	13	—	123	BPI: 5× Platinum; NVPI: Gold; RIANZ: Gold
1989	Holding Back the River: Released: 30 October 1989; Label: Mercury; Formats: CD, cassette, LP	2	12	—	34	28	—	—	—	—	—	BPI: 2× Platinum; ARIA: Gold
1992	High on the Happy Side: Released: 27 January 1992; Label: Mercury; Formats: CD, cassette, LP	1	19	13	18	8	—	—	48	40	—	BPI: Platinum
1995	Picture This: Released: 10 April 1995; Label: Mercury; Formats: CD, cassette, LP	1	22	1	6	4	12	6	25	8	—	BPI: 3× Platinum; IFPI: Platinum
1997	10: Released: 31 March 1997; Label: Mercury; Formats: CD, Cassette, LP	2	—	28	30	22	—	—	—	50	—	BPI: Platinum
2007	Timeless: Released: 12 November 2007; Label: Dry; Formats: CD	41	—	—	—	—	—	—	—	—	—	
2021	The Journey: Released: 5 November 2021; Label: Absolute; Formats: CD, LP, digital download, streaming	29	—	—	—	—	—	—	—	—	—	
"—" denotes releases that did not chart or were not released.

=== Compilation albums ===
Year	Album details	Peak chart positions										Certifications
Year	Album details	UK	AUS	AUT	GER	NL	NZ	NOR	SWE	SWI	US Heat	Certifications
1993	End of Part One: Their Greatest Hits: Released: 8 November 1993; Label: Mercury; Formats: CD, cassette	1	2	1	1	1	1	3	1	5	—	BPI: 4× Platinum; ARIA: Platinum; IFPI: 3× Platinum
1994	Part One: Released: 26 July 1994 [US only]; Label: Mercury; Formats: CD	—	—	—	—	—	—	—	—	—	24	
2004	The Greatest Hits: Released: 8 November 2004; Label: Mercury; Formats: CD	13	—	—	—	—	—	—	—	—	—	BPI: Platinum
2007	The Best of Wet Wet Wet: Released: 2 April 2007 [Germany only]; Label: Brunswick/Universal; Formats: CD	—	—	—	—	—	—	—	—	—	—	
2008	Best of Wet Wet Wet: Released: 2008 [Germany only]; Label: Brunswick/Universal; Formats: CD	—	—	—	—	—	—	—	—	—	—	
2010	Sweet Little Mystery: The Collection: Released: 22 February 2010; Label: Spectrum; Formats: CD	—	—	—	—	—	—	—	—	—	—	
2013	Step by Step: The Greatest Hits: Released: 25 November 2013; Label: Virgin; Formats: CD	53	—	—	—	—	—	—	—	—	—	BPI: Gold
"—" denotes releases that did not chart or was not released.

=== Live albums ===
Year	Album details	Peak chart positions
Year	Album details	UK
1990	Wet Wet Wet: Live: Released: 1 December 1990; Label: Mercury; Formats: cassette	—
1993	Live at the Royal Albert Hall: with The Wren Orchestra; Released: 17 May 1993; Label: Mercury; Formats: CD, Cassette, LP	10
2006	Live – Volume One & Two: Mail on Sunday: Released: September 2006; Label: Mercury; Formats: CD	—
2021	The Journey Out of Lockdown: The Greatest Hits Live from Glasgow: Released: 4 June 2021; Label: Dry; Formats: Digital download	
2024	Live in Denmark: Released: 19 January 2024; Label: Dry; Formats: LP, Digital download	—

=== Other albums ===
Year	Album details	Peak chart positions		Certification
Year	Album details	UK	NL	Certification
1988	The Memphis Sessions: Released: 7 November 1988; Label: Mercury; Formats: CD, Cassette, LP	3	9	BPI: Platinum
1992	Cloak & Dagger: released under the name: Maggie Pie & The Impostors; Released: 28 January 1992; Label: Mercury; Formats: CD, cassette, LP; Also available as bonus disc to High on the Happy Side	—	—	

== Singles ==
Year	Single	Peak chart positions										Certifications	Album
Year	Single	UK	AUS	AUT	FRA	GER	IRE	NL	NZ	SWI	US	Certifications	Album
1987	"Wishing I Was Lucky"	6	100	—	40	—	6	19	26	—	58		Popped In Souled Out
1987	"Sweet Little Mystery"	5	33	—	17	46	9	22	3	23	—	BPI: Silver	Popped In Souled Out
1987	"Angel Eyes (Home and Away)"	5	—	—	20	17	9	3	4	—	—	BPI: Silver	Popped In Souled Out
1988	"Temptation"	12	—	—	—	—	8	51	19	—	—		Popped In Souled Out
1988	"With a Little Help from My Friends"	1	—	—	—	—	1	—	—	—	—	BPI: Silver	Sgt. Pepper Knew My Father
1989	"Sweet Surrender"	6	7	24	—	37	1	10	—	—	—	ARIA: Gold	Holding Back the River
1989	"Broke Away"	19	—	—	—	—	9	—	—	—	—		Holding Back the River
1990	"Hold Back the River"	31	—	—	—	—	16	—	—	—	—		Holding Back the River
1990	"Stay with Me Heartache (Can't Stand the Night)"	30	62	—	—	—	30	—	—	—	—		Holding Back the River
1991	"Make It Tonight"	37	110	—	—	—	—	—	—	—	—		High on the Happy Side
1991	"Put the Light On"	56	—	—	—	—	—	—	—	—	—		High on the Happy Side
1991	"Goodnight Girl"	1	21	27	—	35	1	2	33	—	—		High on the Happy Side
1992	"More than Love"	19	—	—	—	—	24	13	—	—	—		High on the Happy Side
1992	"Lip Service"	15	154	—	—	—	24	—	—	—	—		High on the Happy Side
1993	"Blue for You" (live) / "This Time" (live)	38	—	—	—	—	—	—	—	—	—		Live at the Royal Albert Hall
1993	"Shed a Tear"	22	70	—	—	53	25	—	—	—	—		End of Part One: Their Greatest Hits
1993	"Cold Cold Heart"	20	—	—	—	—	—	41	—	—	—		End of Part One: Their Greatest Hits
1994	"Love Is All Around"	1	1	1	2	2	2	1	1	2	41	BPI: 3× Platinum; ARIA: 3× Platinum; BVMI: Platinum; RMNZ: Platinum	End of Part One: Their Greatest Hits
1994	"Goodnight Girl '94"	—	26	—	—	46	—	14	24	12	—		End of Part One: Their Greatest Hits
1995	"Julia Says"	3	38	19	—	42	3	22	—	—	—	BPI: Silver	Picture This
1995	"Don't Want to Forgive Me Now"	7	45	—	—	66	18	—	45	—	—		Picture This
1995	"Somewhere Somehow"	7	109	—	—	78	7	44	—	—	—		Picture This
1995	"She's All on My Mind"	17	—	—	—	—	28	—	—	—	—		Picture This
1996	"Morning"	16	171	—	—	—	—	—	—	—	—		Picture This
1997	"If I Never See You Again"	3	148	—	—	63	14	72	—	36	—		10
1997	"Strange"	13	—	—	—	95	—	83	—	—	—		10
1997	"Yesterday / Maybe I'm in Love"	4	—	—	—	81	19	74	—	—	—		10
2004	"All I Want"	14	—	—	—	—	—	—	—	—	—		The Greatest Hits
2007	"Too Many People"	46	—	—	—	—	—	—	—	—	—		Timeless
2008	"Weightless"	10	—	—	—	—	—	—	—	—	—		Timeless
2013	"Step by Step"	—	—	—	—	—	—	—	—	—	—		Step by Step – The Greatest Hits
2021	"Back to Memphis"	—	—	—	—	—	—	—	—	—	—		The Journey
2021	"The Conversation"	—	—	—	—	—	—	—	—	—	—		The Journey
2021	"Happy Xmas (War Is Over)" / "Have Yourself a Merry Little Christmas"	—	—	—	—	—	—	—	—	—	—		Non-album single
2022	"Northern Town" / "In Your Eyes"	—	—	—	—	—	—	—	—	—	—		The Journey
"—" denotes releases that did not chart or was not released.

=== Promotional singles ===
Year	Single	Album
1988	"This Time"	The Memphis Sessions
1990	"Blue for You"	Holding Back the River
1993	"I Can Give You Everything" (live)	Live at the Royal Albert Hall
