= The Greatest Hits (Wet Wet Wet album) =

Greatest hits album by Wet Wet Wet
- Released: 8 November 2004
- Recorded: 1986–2004
- Genre: Pop; pop rock
- Label: Mercury
- Producer: Wet Wet Wet

Wet Wet Wet chronology
10 (1997)	The Greatest Hits (2004)	Timeless (2007)

Singles from The Greatest Hits
- 1. "All I Want" Released: 1 November 2004

Professional ratings
Review scores
Source	Rating
AllMusic	4.5/5 stars

The Greatest Hits is the second greatest hits compilation album by Scottish pop rock quartet Wet Wet Wet. Released on 8 November 2004, it was the band's first release since disbanding seven years earlier. The album reached No. 13 in the UK Albums Chart, and spawned the single "All I Want", which peaked at No. 14 on the UK Singles Chart.

The album contains a selection of singles from across the band's ten-year career, as well as three previously unreleased tracks. A limited edition double-disc version of the album, containing further singles plus five previously unreleased live recordings, was also made available for a limited time from the day of release.

"All I Want" was one of five new songs recorded for the campaign with two further new recordings, "Hear Me Now" and "(Feels Like I'm) Walking on Water", appear on the album itself, and "Learn from Each Mistake" and "I Don't Wanna Fight Anymore" appear as B-sides on the All I Want single release.

== Track listing ==
All tracks are written by Clark/Cunningham/Mitchell/Pellow, except "With a Little Help from My Friends", by Lennon–McCartney and "Love is All Around" by Reg Presley.

No.	Title	Length
1.	"All I Want" (previously unreleased)	4:14
2.	"Goodnight Girl"	3:40
3.	"Temptation" (edited version†)	3:58
4.	"Lip Service" (Greatest Hits version)	4:08
5.	"Love Is All Around"	3:58
6.	"Julia Says"	4:09
7.	"Wishing I Was Lucky"	3:52
8.	"Sweet Surrender" (7" version)	4:22
9.	"Hear Me Now" (previously unreleased)	4:02
10.	"Sweet Little Mystery"	3:42
11.	"Somewhere Somehow"	3:51
12.	"Can't Stand the Night"	4:10
13.	"If I Never See You Again"	3:50
14.	"Angel Eyes" (single version)	4:30
15.	"Don't Want to Forgive Me Now"	2:55
16.	"She's All on My Mind"	3:55
17.	"Morning" (Greatest Hits version)	3:52
18.	"Strange" (radio edit)	3:36
19.	"With a Little Help from My Friends"	2:37
20.	"(Feels Like I'm) Walking on Water" (previously unreleased)	4:35

The Greatest Hits — Limited Edition Bonus Disc
No.	Title	Length
1.	"Broke Away" (short version)	3:59
2.	"Yesterday"	2:45
3.	"Maybe I'm in Love"	3:12
4.	"Make It Tonight"	4:05
5.	"Cold Cold Heart" (radio edit)	3:50
6.	"Put the Light On"	3:57
7.	"More Than Love"	4:21
8.	"Hold Back the River"	4:45
9.	"Shed a Tear"	4:38
10.	"Blue for You"	4:51
11.	"This Time"	4:16
12.	"East of the River" (Memphis Sessions version)	3:39
13.	"Get Ready"	3:08
14.	"I Can Give You Everything" (live in Glasgow)	5:06
15.	"Temptation" (live at Adam Street, London)	4:33
16.	"Goodnight Girl" (live at Adam Street, London)	4:07
17.	"Love Is All Around" (live at Adam Street, London)	4:11
18.	"With a Little Help from My Friends" (live in Kuala Lumpur)	4:19

The Greatest Hits — B-Sides
No.	Title	Length
1.	"Learn from Each Mistake"	2:36
2.	"I Don't Wanna Fight Anymore"	3:39
3.	"Goodnight Girl" (Live in Newcastle)	4:17
4.	"All I Want" (radio mix)	3:48

== Charts ==
Chart (2004)	Peak position	Certification
UK Albums Chart	13	UK: Platinum
