= High on the Happy Side =

Album by Wet Wet Wet

Studio album by Wet Wet Wet
- Released: 27 January 1992
- Recorded: Lincoln; Switzerland; Los Angeles
- Studio: The Manor
- Genres: Blue-eyed soul; pop; soul pop; soul; Americana
- Length: 45:19
- Labels: The Precious Organisation; Phonogram; Mercury
- Producers: Wet Wet Wet; Albhy Galuten (co-producer); Axel Kröll (co-producer)

Wet Wet Wet chronology
Wet Wet Wet: Live (1990)	High on the Happy Side (1992)	Wet Wet Wet: Live at the Royal Albert Hall (1992)

Singles from High on the Happy Side
- 1. "Make It Tonight" Released: 2 September 1991; 2. "Put the Light On" Released: 21 October 1991; 3. "Goodnight Girl" Released: 23 December 1991; 4. "More Than Love" Released: 9 March 1992; 5. "Lip Service" Released: 29 June 1992

High on the Happy Side is the third studio album by Scottish pop quartet Wet Wet Wet, released on 27 January 1992 through Phonogram Inc. and Precious. Self-produced by the band in numerous worldwide studios, the album presents a mellower and more mature sound than earlier records, showcasing the band's soul sound alongside guitar-driven melodies and a variety of styles including pop, dance, reggae, balladry and acoustic music, with the group experimenting with new sounds and forgerounding vocal harmony. Its more basic, guitar-based genesis was in contrast to the dense sound of its predecessor, Holding Back the River (1989), which was disliked by the band. A limited edition of the album included a bonus disc, Cloak & Dagger, containing cover versions and credited under the pseudonym Maggie Pie & The Impostors.

Wet Wet Wet promoted High on the Happy Side with several acoustic shows and numerous appearances on music-oriented television shows. Although the first two singles from the album, "Make It Tonight" and "Put the Light On", were commercially unsuccessful on their release in late 1991, the release of the third single, the romantic ballad "Goodnight Girl", reversed the band's fortunes and spent four weeks at number one in Britain in early 1992. The success of the song helped the album debut at the top of the UK Albums Chart, where it stayed for two weeks. Music critics noted the group's change in musical style, and their maturing image won them new fans. The record was followed by two further hit singles, "More than Love" and "Lip Service".

== Background ==
Wet Wet Wet's second studio album, Holding Back the River (1989), produced a hit single with "Sweet Surrender", but further singles were less successful. Moreover, the album failed to repeat the million-selling success of their debut, Popped In Souled Out (1987), and received poor reviews from music critics. Members of the band, such as singer Marti Pellow and keyboardist Neil Mitchell, regretted the decision to self-produce the album and to portray a more mature image, feeling these moves were premature, and it prompted "a serious rethink for the band", according to Bruce Dessau of Vox, who notes that the band largely disappeared from the public eye after a free show on Glasgow Green prior to the album's 1989 release. Mitchell says the bad sales "definitely gave us a kick in the arse", but that the 'failure' was a learning curve that allowed them to produce High on the Happy Side more satisfactorily.

By the recording of High on the Happy Side, the group had amassed a total of 4,500,000 album sales, and were able to "make the transition from teenybopper idols to well respected major pop stars", according to Music & Media's Robbert Tilli. The record was recorded while Pellow grew his hair, demonstrating the continued maturity of the group and their image.

== Recording ==
Wet Wet Wet began work on the album in 1990 and initially planned to hire an outside producer. Dave Stewart was an early consideration, but the band discovered that he needed to be booked several years in advance and were unable to wait that long; however, they did book his recording studio. Another suggestion was Electric Light Orchestra (ELO) founder Jeff Lynne, who lived near Stewart; according to bassist Graeme Clark, Wet Wet Wet "learnt a lot" from the string arrangements from ELO's Greatest Hits (1979). Clark says that, after the band played Lynne demos of High on the Happy Side, Lynne told them they did not need a producer, thus restoring the band's confidence to produce the album themselves.

The self-produced album was recorded at numerous across the world, including two in Lincoln, England (one being The Chapel), one in Los Angeles (also 'The Chapel') and a studio in Switzerland. The recording began in Lincolnshire and ended in Los Angeles for post-production fixes, with the finishing touches of the album added at Dave Stewart's home garden studio in Encino. During production, an image of the Traveling Wilburys hung on the wall with the faces of the group changed to the faces of Wet Wet Wet. Several guest musicians appear on the record, including low whistle player Davy Spillane and bodhrán and bouzouk player Donal Lunny on "Put on the Light".

Pellow said that High on the Happy Side was "about the basics, getting the song right on the guitar", in contrast to Holding Back the River, which Pellow believes was marred by poor songs concealed by overproduction, using samples and technology "to shine a turd". According to drummer Tommy Cunningham, the sessions were more productive than those for Holding Back the River, and the group hired a man dubbed the Drum Doctor to help them achieve superior drum sounds. Cunningham notes that the final production cost was £300,000, lower than the £400,000 for their previous album: "That pleased Phonogram when we told them, though they'll probably be worried now that we've done it on the cheap."

== Compostition ==
Marking a departure from Wet Wet Wet's earlier sound, High on the Happy Side sees the band maturing and has a mellower groove, joining their strong soul influences and Hammond organ-based funk elements with guitar-friendly melodies "to draw in the Dire Straits brigade", according to Dessau. The critic Jonathan Lewis theorises that the band realised soul-pop ballads were their speciality, hence the album being less pop-oriented than Holding Back the River, returning the group to their soul roots. The album has been characterised as white soul, and pop, or more specifically "a collection of 'mature' pop songs". The reviewer Nick Duerden characterised the album as another "indulgence in Americana" for Wet Wet Wet, following The Memphis Sessions (1988) and Holding Back the River, adding that it balances bluesy ballads typical of the group, such as "More Than Love", with more upbeat material, including the horn-heavy "Lip Service".

Throughout the album, Wet Wet Wet explore a variety of styles, including, pop, soul, balladry, quasi-dance, rock on "Two Days After Midnight" and restraint on the torch song "Brand New Sunrise". The strings on the latter track were arranged by Paul Buckmaster, famous for arranging Elton John's "Your Song" (1970). Unlike earlier albums, vocal harmonies are brought to the fore – although Pellow's voice remains the focus – and the group largely abandoned the use of synthesisers that had typified their early sound; as a result, there are several acoustic songs on the album. There are ultimately fewer rock songs than on earlier albums, with slower pop songs like "Put the Light on" and "Make It Tonight" typifying the album. According to the critic Jeremy Miles, the band showed a greater desire to experiment than on earlier albums, as is particularly evident with the Stone Roses-inspired drum beat on "Lip Service".

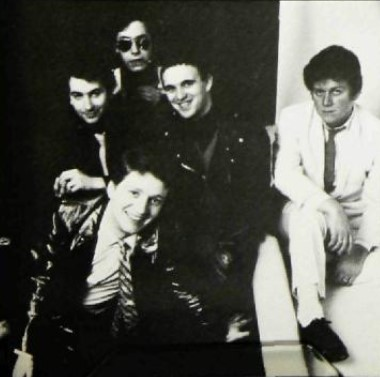
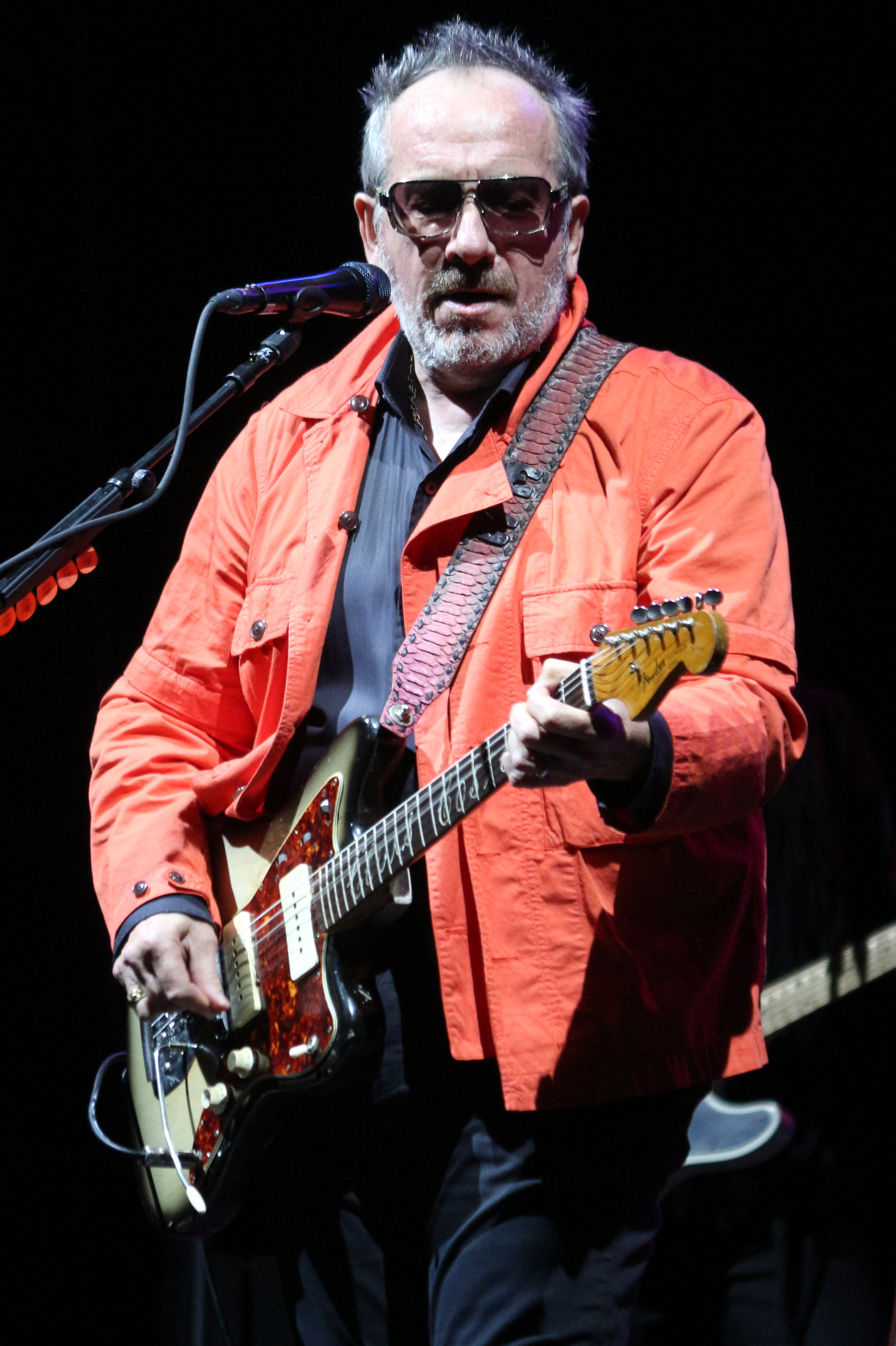
Influences on Wet Wet Wet included Squeeze (left, 1979) and Elvis Costello (right, 2021)

Although critics had often compared Wet Wet Wet to Simply Red and Hue and Cry, Pellow preferred the band to be grouped alongside Squeeze and Elvis Costello, who were both early major influences on them. Clark, who wrote many of the record's melodies, noted that several lines and riffs were derived from those artists, such as a breakdown from Squeeze's 1978 debut album and "bits" of Costello's album Trust (1981). He felt that High on the Happy Side "is more Eagles, more Fleetwood Mac. Then again 'More Than Love' is more epic. The beginning is like the theme to World in Action."

"More Than Love" begins panoramically before settling into a groove, whereas "Lip Service" is a horn-driven gospel song evoking the band's early work. Colin Larkin believes the song "suggested a new interest in more dance-oriented music." "Put the Light On" incorporates a folk jig and was named the highlight by Dessau, who believes it "places Wet Wet Wet alongside The Waterboys as true Scots lads discovering their raggly taggly roots with a bit of jiggery Poguery." In addition to the Pogues, the song has been compared to Del Amitri and Elvis Costello. The title track features a reggae-flavoured lilt, while "Maybe Tomorrow" blends UB40-style reggae with a shuffling soul sound and has been described as a "horizontal mambo", characterised by harmonies, brass instruments and samples of Little Feat's "Dixie Chicken" (1973).

"Goodnight Girl" is a violin-driven love song with striking strings arranged by Fiachra Trench, famous for their work with Van Morrison. The critic David Quantick described it as a "throbbing, swirling, melody-laden ballad of total harmonic bossness and wisely-apportioned vocal delight", while Tom Ewing of Freaky Trigger said it married a strong hook to lyrical vagueness. "Celebration" is an "acoustic guitar-strum" with upbeat harmony vocals and is reminiscent of America's "A Horse with No Name" (1971). "Make It Tonight", one of the more dance-oriented songs, has been compared musically to Marvin Gaye's "Sexual Healing" (1982), whereas "How Long" has been compared to the music of Gerry Rafferty.

== Release and promotion ==
=== Early marketing and album shelving ===
Wet Wet Wet's label, Phonogram, utilised a standard marketing campaign for the album, according to their international marketing manager Ian Grenfell, who contended that the band were not one "to experiment on". To this end, in August and October 1991, the band played two acoustic shows in London and Cologne, with members of the press in attendance. These shows, which marked the group's return after almost two years, were described by Grenfell as "very causal showcases" to display their musicality and seriousness, evoking Elvis Presley's 1968 comeback special. Another acoustic set was recorded for Countdown Cafe on Radio Veronica in the Netherlands. Later in 1991, the band travelled around Britain and Europe on a promo tour, appearing on as many TV programmes as possible. Grenfell says that more music-oriented, "quality" TV shows were sought out, such as Germany's Live Aus Dem Schlachtof, for whom Wet Wet Wet performed an electric set in December. On 21 September, three songs from the upcoming album were broadcast on the French radio staiton NRJ to commemorate its 10th anniversary.

Released in late 1991, the first two singles pulled from High on the Happy Side were commercially unsuccessful. "Make It Tonight" reached number 37 on the UK Singles Chart in September, the lowest chart peak for the band to date. The journalist Andrew Collins noted that "the serious press" enjoyed the failure of Wet Wet Wet's comeback single, as the band had become "so established and safe". The record was then broken by the second single, "Put the Light Out", which reached number 56 in October. At this point, according to Cunningham, the band were at high risk of being dropped from their label. As a music reviewer, Quantick bemoaned the band's lack of top-five chart success compared to bands like Deacon Blue, saying Wet Wet Wet "release bizarre and often groovy records that too often drop silently down the chart well to fall unnoticed into the earth's core". Although High on the Happy Side was intended for release prior to Christmas 1991, it was held back for a strategic rethink, and Phonogram ultimately sat on the album for three months.

=== "Goodnight Girl" and album release ===
"Goodnight Girl", which exemplifies the band's easy-going, romantic sound, was chosen as the album's third single. Given that the group were to be dropped from Phonogram, Cunningham describes it as "a massive gamble" to release "the quietest, most emotionally open song". Released on 4 January 1992, it reversed the fortunes of the band, reaching number one in the UK, dislodging a reissue of Queen's "Bohemian Rhapsody", and staying at the top for four weeks. It was the band's second number one, after "With a Little Help from My Friends" (1988) and the first to be an original composition. The second part of the album's promotion was built around the single's success, with playback television performances; as Grenfell said, "they're well into mass market now. They have real-across-the-board appeal." Cunningham says the song saved Wet Wet Wet's career, and ensured that "we would never be looked upon as the group who had a hit with The Beatles charity record. It was the first sign that we had longevity. It showed us that people did appreciate us, they were just waiting for the right tune to come along." The music writer Colin Larkin believes the success of the song enhanced the group's reputation as "one of the leading UK pop bands."

High on the Happy Side was ultimately released on 27 January 1992, on Phonogram imprint Precious, after much anticipation caused by the success of "Goodnight Girl". A limited edition version, available in Britain during its first week on sale, also included a bonus disc, Cloak & Dagger, featuring cover versions of songs by Costello, the Temptations, Todd Rundgren and others. For this disc, the band used the pseudonym Maggie & The Imposters and posed as a veteran band. This version was priced at the same price as the single-disc version, to give fans value for money and to encourage them to buy the album on release. An electronic press kit and interview disc were also distributed to the press, and merchandise was released including a black Wet Wet Wet scarf and a bathrobe to keep fans "dry dry dry". High on the Happy Side debuted at number one on the UK Albums Chart on 8 February, dislodging Simply Red's Stars and remaining there for two weeks, before Stars returned to the top. The album was certified Platinum by the British Phonographic Industry (BPI) on the week of release. Two further singles from the album were released in 1992 which also broke the UK Top 20; "More Than Love" reached number 19 in March and "Lip Service" reached number 15 in July, the latter a more dance-oriented choice of single for the band.

== Critical reception ==
Professional ratings
Review scores
Source	Rating
AllMusic	4/5 stars
Daily Echo	6/10
Encyclopedia of Popular Music	2/5 stars
Evening Herald	1/10
NME	1/10
Select	4/5 stars
Smash Hits	3/5 stars
South Wales Echo	2.5/5 stars

Despite the band's change in sound, High on the Happy Side received critical acclaim. In his review for Select, Nick Duerden commented that High on the Happy Side "struts and stomps with a rediscovered buoyancy", believing the group's transition to adult territory has been "smoother than most" due to their musical skills, and adding that the album is a "fine indication of their growing potential" and a demonstration that "their nirvana is rooted somewhere between Memphis and Motown." Naming it "Best New Album" for Smash Hits, Nick Soutar called it "probably [Wet Wet Wet's] best; confidently breezing through a ton of musical styles – pop, ballad, soul and (kind of) dance", and felt that despite "Goodnight Girl" being the only likely hit, "How Long" is "a corker". Elsewhere, Daily Echo critic Jeremy Miles called it "a fine, accomplished pop record" with a variety of styles, praising Pellow's vocal abilities, but expressing reservation about the band's "dearth of originality", adding: "While they show a greater willingness to experiment than ever before (note the Stone Roses drum beat on 'Lip Service'), it is all crafted emulation and little more."

Adam Sweeting of The Guardian called it an album of 'mature' pop songs "assembled with such exhausting care and neatness that you're inclined to slip on an apron and rubber gloves before unwrapping it", further lamenting that the band "produced it to death, because they can actually write songs." Andy Gill of The Independent compared Wet Wet Wet to Rick Astley due to their shared eagerness to prove that they are not mere teen pop acts; "yet, also like him, their deepest desire, musically speaking, seems to be to replicate the sound of a naff ersatz-soul band of the early Seventies". He considered High on the Happy Side anaemic, adding that "a diluted strain of blue-eyed soul motions run through with competence and little conviction. The songwriting is generally atrocious, lazy and lacklustre." The South Wales Echo found it a likeable but "unmemorable set of watered down songs", feeling that "growing your hair and shedding the teen image isn't enough". They did however praise "Maybe Tomorrow" as an "excellent", harmony- and brass-led song.

In a scathing review, Andrew Collins of the NME considered it "one of the very worst pieces of over-slick, pompously-presented, self-congratulatory nonsense I have ever heard", finding simple melodies "bludgeoned by airy technique and studio smugness", and many slow songs ruined by Pellow's "utterly undisciplined vocal aerobics". Barry Egan of the Sunday Independent dismissed it as bland, taking issue with Pellow's "grinning goms" and the band "bristling with all the standard issue histrionics" of soul. He lamented that, by attempting to shed their young audience and become more mature by growing longer hair and beards, Wet Wet Wet had lost their "sparkle and magic", turning into something "only the dead and almost dead can appreciate." Coventry Evening Telegraph named it one of the worst albums of January 1992, calling Pellow a "prat" and the band "utter rubbish". Retrospectively, AllMusic's Jonathan Lewis describes High on the Happy Side as one of the group's better and more interesting records; despite noting imperfections in the songwriting and several songs moving "too far into syrupy ballad territory", he praised the acoustic songs and the new foregrounding of vocal harmonies, saying "there is still enough variation to show that, amazingly, a band like Wet Wet Wet can actually make their sound evolve."

== Legacy and aftermath ==
Craig Winn of M8 notes that, whereas Wet Wet Wet had been "written off" before High on the Happy Side due to their largely teenage appeal, the decision to record a "mature" album won them new fans and allowed them to become "flavour of the month" again. In his "Review of 1992", Jim Lawn of The Lennox Herald hailed the record as one of the key comebacks of the year, for producing a number one single and keeping the band "firmly in the public eye." Dessau said that, although the album could be viewed as an attempt by Wet Wet Wet to follow Sheena Easton, EMF and Jesus Jones in trying to break the American market, the group largely went without marketing or an audience there, despite "their sleek brand of radio-friendly George Michael-esque soul." Angela Lewis of the NME comments that the "straightforward, mature pop classicism" which shaped High on the Happy Side continued to be felt on the band's follow-up album, Picture This (1995). Also in 1995, The Mercury in Norfolk published Sally Howsam's top ten singles, which included the title track at number five.

A VHS compilation, also entitled High on the Happy Side, was released through PolyGram Video International in mid-1992, covering the band's whole career up to that point. The videos to early songs, from "Wishing I Was Lucky" to "Temptation", are presented in 20-second snippets, but the band's later videos are presented in full. According to reviewer Michelle Kirsh, "Marti's Kylie-esque transformation from Phillip Schofield lookalike to long-locked Michael Bolton type is chronicled in loving detail", deeming the VHS "a perfect guide on how to sell a pop group."

== Track listing ==
All tracks are written by Clark/Cunningham/Mitchell/Pellow.

No.	Title	Length
1.	"More Than Love"	4:21
2.	"Lip Service"	4:59
3.	"Put the Light On"	3:57
4.	"High on the Happy Side"	4:38
5.	"Maybe Tomorrow"	4:17
6.	"Goodnight Girl"	3:40
7.	"Celebration"	2:50
8.	"Make It Tonight"	4:05
9.	"How Long"	4:15
10.	"Brand New Sunrise"	2:59
11.	"2 Days After Midnite"	5:04

High on the Happy Side – B-Sides
No.	Title	Length
1.	"Ordinary Love"	2:55
2.	"Big Sister Midnight" (Lip Service - original demo)	5:27
3.	"Make it Tonight" (E.T. Mix)	4:18
4.	"Just Like Any Other Day"	3:33
5.	"Goodnight Girl" (No Strings Attached version)	3:40
6.	"Ambrosia Wykes"	7:28
7.	"Put the Light on" (acoustic)
8.	"More than Love" (E.T. Mix)	4:25
9.	"Goodnight Girl" (Rhythm Mix)	3:39
10.	"Perfect Lie"	3:53
11.	"Lip Service" (Youth Mix)	4:33
12.	"Lip Service" (live, Birmingham NEC, 17/03/92)	5:56
13.	"More Than Love" (live, Wembley Arena, 20/03/92)	4:40
14.	"Celebration" (live, Edinburgh Playhouse, 15/03/92)	3:48
15.	"Put the Light On" (live, Sheffield Arena, 09/03/92)	3:05
16.	"Brand New Sunrise" (live, Plymouth Pavilions, 06/03/92)	3:08
17.	"Hold Back the River" (live, Manchester Apollo, 02/03/92)
18.	"Temptation" (live, Glasgow SECC, 13/03/92)
19.	"Atlantic Avenue" (live, Birmingham NEC, 16/03/92)

High on the Happy Side – The Story So Far (VHS)
No.	Title	Length
1.	"Sweet Surrender"
2.	"Broke Away"
3.	"Hold Back the River"
4.	"Stay with Me Heartache"
5.	"Make it Tonight"
6.	"Put the Light On"
7.	"Goodnight Girl"
8.	"More than Love"

== Cloak & Dagger ==
Cloak & Dagger

Studio album by Maggie Pie & The Imposters
- Released: 27 January 1992
- Genres: Pop, pop rock
- Label: Mercury Records
- Producer: Wet Wet Wet

Maggie Pie & The Imposters chronology
High on the Happy Side (1992)	Cloak & Dagger (1992)	Live at the Royal Albert Hall (1993)

Professional ratings
Review scores
Source	Rating
Encyclopedia of Popular Music	3/5 stars

Cloak & Dagger is a free album of cover versions released with the deluxe edition High on the Happy Side. Included with the deluxe versions of the CD, Cassette & Vinyl pressings of the album, Cloak & Dagger was recorded and released under the pseudonym Maggie Pie & The Impostors, a fake veteran act from Scotland. Notably, the album cover pictures unofficial band member Graeme Duffin on an album cover for the first time, having only previously appeared in group shots featured in the booklet of the band's second studio album, Holding Back the River.

In the NME, Collins dismissed Cloak & Dagger as "an embarrassingly dressed adult cover version cavalcade" and criticised the fake band name, as well as the fake biographies of the members in the liner notes, which he compared to Hale and Pace and felt lent "a final flourish of mistaken self-confidence" to the project. Gill in The Independent felt that the disc was intended to "offer a few pointers as to what was intended with High on the Happy Side", but considered it a mistake, considering the band inferior to the songs, despite the group's "emasculatory efforts" to cover them, and opining that the "allegedly amusing sleeve-note shows them to be as bereft of wit as they are musical interest." For The Guardian, Sweeting called it "a free album of anaemic cover versions" and believed it was "suicidal" because it demonstrates how indebted "Goodnight Girl" is to Rundgren's "Wouldn't Have Made a Difference". In The Virgin Encyclopedia of Popular Music (1997), Larkin gave the album three stars out of five, one star higher than High on the Happy Side.

=== Track listing ===
No.	Title	Writer(s)	Length
1.	"If You Only Knew"	Mose Allison	2:54
2.	"Wouldn't Have Made Any Difference"	Todd Rundgren	3:50
3.	"Atlantic Avenue"	Steve Ferrone; Alan Gorrie; White	2:47
4.	"Town Crier"	Elvis Costello	4:27
5.	"Angeline"	John Martyn	3:36
6.	"Get Ready"	William Robinson	3:08
7.	"Share Your Love"	Al "TNT" Braggs; Deadric Malone	3:23
8.	"You've Got a Friend"	Carole King	4:33
9.	"Beg Your Pardon, Dear"	Tom Waits	3:25

== Personnel ==
Adapted from the liner notes of High on the Happy Side

Wet Wet Wet

- Marti Pellow – lead vocals, backing vocals
- Graeme Clark – bass, double bass, acoustic guitar, backing vocals
- Neil Mitchell – piano, keyboards
- Tommy Cunningham – drums, percussion, backing vocals
- Graeme Duffin – electric and acoustic guitar, backing vocals
- Wet Wet Wet – producer, writer, arranger, performer

Additional

- Donal Lunny – bodhrán, bouzouk ("Put on the Light")
- Davy Spillane – low whistle ("Put on the Light")
- Lenny Castro – percussion ("Maybe Tomorrow", "Celebration")
- Dan Higgins – saxophone ("Maybe Tomorrow", "Celebration")
- Bill Reichenbach Jr. – trombone ("Maybe Tomorrow", "Celebration")
- Gary Grant – trumpet ("Maybe Tomorrow", "Celebration")
- Jerry Hey – trumpet ("Maybe Tomorrow")
- Albhy Galuten – additional producer ("How Long")
- Axel Kröll – additional producer ("Lip Service", "High on the Happy Side" and "Maybe Tomorrow")
- Don Jack – art direction
- Ideas – design
- Jill Furmanovsky – photography

== Charts ==
Chart performance for High on the Happy Side
Chart (1992)	Peak position
Australian Albums (ARIA)	19
Austrian Albums (Ö3 Austria)	13
Dutch Albums (Album Top 100)	8
German Albums (Offizielle Top 100)	18
Swedish Albums (Sverigetopplistan)	48
Swiss Albums (Schweizer Hitparade)	40
UK Albums (Official Charts)	1

== Certifications ==
Certifications for High on the Happy Side
Region	Certification	Certified units/sales
United Kingdom (BPI)	Platinum	300,000^{^}
^{^} Shipments figures based on certification alone.
