= Step by Step: The Greatest Hits =

Greatest hits album by Wet Wet Wet
- Released: 25 November 2013
- Recorded: 1986–2013
- Genre: Pop, pop rock
- Length: 1:18:45
- Label: Virgin
- Producer: Wet Wet Wet

Wet Wet Wet chronology
Timeless (2007)	Step by Step: The Greatest Hits (2013)

Singles from Step by Step: The Greatest Hits
- 1. "Step by Step" Released: 18 November 2013

Step by Step: The Greatest Hits is the third compilation album released by Scottish pop rock quartet Wet Wet Wet. Released on 25 November 2013, the album features three previously unreleased recordings, "Step by Step", "Sad Kinda Love", and "Playin' Like a Kid". "Step by Step" was also released as the lead single from the album a week prior to its release. The album peaked at #53 on the UK Albums Chart, becoming the band's lowest charting release to date.

The album was promoted with a ten-date tour of the UK, which saw the band supported by Blue. All ten dates on the tour were recorded for a series of live albums by Abbey Road Studios as part of their Live Here Now releases. The final date of the tour was also recorded for a DVD release, which was initially given away as a free gift to those who purchased a full set of the live albums. The live DVD was later released commercially on 29 September 2014.

== Track listing ==
All tracks are written by Clark/Cunningham/Mitchell/Pellow, except "With a Little Help from My Friends", by Lennon–McCartney and "Love is All Around" by Reg Presley.

No.	Title	Length
1.	"Step by Step" (previously unreleased)	3:57
2.	"Sad Kinda Love" (previously unreleased)	4:31
3.	"Playin' Like a Kid" (previously unreleased)	4:34
4.	"Don't Want to Forgive Me Now"	2:55
5.	"With a Little Help from My Friends"	2:37
6.	"Sweet Little Mystery"	3:42
7.	"Broke Away" (short version)	3:59
8.	"Julia Says"	4:09
9.	"Lip Service" (Greatest Hits version)	4:08
10.	"Angel Eyes" (single version)	4:30
11.	"Sweet Surrender" (7" version)	4:22
12.	"All I Want"	4:14
13.	"Goodnight Girl"	3:40
14.	"Hold Back the River"	4:45
15.	"Wishing I Was Lucky"	3:52
16.	"Weightless"	3:29
17.	"Temptation" (edited version†)	3:58
18.	"Somewhere Somehow"	3:51
19.	"If I Never See You Again"	3:50
20.	"Love Is All Around"	3:58

== Step by Step: The Tour ==
Date	City	Country	Venue
Arena Leg
8 December 2013	Manchester	England	Phones 4 U Arena
9 December 2013	Brighton	England	Brighton Centre
10 December 2013	Cardiff	Wales	Motorpoint Arena Cardiff
11 December 2013	London	England	The O2
13 December 2013	Nottingham	England	Capital FM Arena
14 December 2013	Bournemouth	England	Bournemouth International Centre
15 December 2013	Birmingham	England	LG Arena
17 December 2013	Newcastle	England	Metro Radio Arena
18 December 2013	Leeds	England	First Direct Arena
19 December 2013	Glasgow	Scotland	SSE Hydro
Summer Leg
19 July 2014	Newton-le-Willows	England	Haydock Racecourse
23 July 2014	Esher	England	Sandown Racecourse
23 July 2014	York	England	York Racecourse
28 July 2014	Glasgow	Scotland	BBC at the Quay
4 August 2014	Carlisle	England	Carlisle Racecourse
15 August 2014	Newmarket	England	Newmarket Racecourse
16 August 2014	Market Rasen	England	Market Rasen Racecourse
14 September 2014	Chelmsford	England	Hylands House

== Certifications ==
Certifications and sales for Step by Step: The Greatest Hits
Region	Certification	Certified units/sales
United Kingdom (BPI)	Gold	100,000^{‡}
^{‡} Sales+streaming figures based on certification alone.
