= End of Part One: Their Greatest Hits =

Greatest hits album by Wet Wet Wet
- Released: 8 November 1993
- Recorded: 1986–1993
- Genre: Pop, pop rock
- Label: Mercury
- Producer: Wet Wet Wet; Nile Rodgers

Wet Wet Wet chronology
Live at the Royal Albert Hall (1993)	End of Part One: Their Greatest Hits (1993)	Picture This (1995)

Singles from End of Part One: Their Greatest Hits
- 1. "Shed a Tear" Released: 25 October 1993; 2. "Cold Cold Heart" Released: 27 December 1993

Professional ratings
Review scores
Source	Rating
AllMusic	link
Knoxville News Sentinel	3.5/5 stars
Music Week	4/5 stars

End of Part One: Their Greatest Hits is the first compilation album released by Scottish pop rock quartet Wet Wet Wet. Released on 8 November 1993, the album serves as a comprehensive collection of the band's single discography, featuring all sixteen singles released between 1987 and 1993, plus two new songs—"Shed a Tear" and "Cold Cold Heart"—which were recorded by Nile Rodgers at The Hit Factory in New York City, where the album's artwork was also shot. Both went on to be released as a singles.

The album peaked at No. 4 on the UK Albums Chart. An accompanying VHS video, containing the band's fifteen music videos to date, was released three days after the album on 11 November. In 1994, following the release of the band's biggest hit to date, "Love Is All Around", the album was re-released containing the aforementioned song as a bonus track. Subsequently, the album re-entered the UK Albums Chart, this time peaking at No. 1. A US-only version of the album, Part One, was released on 26 July 1994, peaking at No. 24 on the Billboard Heatseekers Chart.

== Track listing ==
All tracks are written by Clark/Cunningham/Mitchell/Pellow, except "With a Little Help from My Friends", by Lennon–McCartney, "This Time" by Willie Mitchell & Ed Adams Jr., and "Love is All Around" by Reg Presley.

No.	Title	Length
1.	"Wishing I Was Lucky"	3:52
2.	"Sweet Little Mystery"	3:42
3.	"Angel Eyes" (single version)	4:30
4.	"Temptation" (edited version†)	3:58
5.	"With a Little Help from My Friends"	2:37
6.	"Sweet Surrender" (7" version)	4:22
7.	"Broke Away" (7" version)	3:59
8.	"Hold Back the River"	4:45
9.	"Stay with Me Heartache"	4:10
10.	"This Time"	4:16
11.	"Make It Tonight"	4:05
12.	"Put the Light On"	3:57
13.	"Goodnight Girl"	3:40
14.	"More Than Love"	4:21
15.	"Lip Service" (7" version)	4:27
16.	"Blue for You" (Live)	5:15
17.	"Shed a Tear"	4:38
18.	"Cold Cold Heart"	4:12

End of Part One – 1994 (re-issue)
No.	Title	Length
19.	"Love Is All Around"	3:58

End of Part One – Greatest Hits & Things version (bonus disc)
No.	Title	Length
1.	"I Can Give You Everything" (Arthur Baker '93 Remix)	4:22
2.	"Wishing I Was Lucky" (Arthur Baker '93 Remix)	3:47
3.	"Get Ready" (Live at 'The Big Day')	3:04
4.	"You've Got a Friend"	4:26
5.	"How Long"	4:11
6.	"For You Are"	4:20
7.	"Jammin'" (Live at Edinburgh Castle)	3:38
8.	"I Wish" (Live at Edinburgh Castle)	4:05
9.	"Wishing I Was Lucky" (Metal remix)	5:39
10.	"East of the River" (Live at the Royal Albert Hall)	3:54
11.	"Brand New Sunshine"	3:00
12.	"Maybe Tomorrow" (Dennis Bovell remix)	4:51

End of Part One – VHS
No.	Title	Length
1.	"Wishing I Was Lucky"	3:52
2.	"Sweet Little Mystery"	3:42
3.	"Angel Eyes"	4:30
4.	"Temptation"	3:58
5.	"With a Little Help from My Friends"	2:37
6.	"Sweet Surrender"	4:22
7.	"Broke Away"	3:59
8.	"Hold Back the River"	4:45
9.	"Stay with Me Heartache"	4:10
10.	"Make It Tonight"	4:05
11.	"Put the Light On"	3:57
12.	"Goodnight Girl"	3:40
13.	"More Than Love"	4:21
14.	"Lip Service"	4:27
15.	"Shed a Tear"	4:38

Part One – (US version)
No.	Title	Length
1.	"Love Is All Around"	3:58
2.	"Cold Cold Heart"	4:12
3.	"I Can Give You Everything" (Arthur Baker '93 Remix)	4:22
4.	"Lip Service" (7" version)	4:27
5.	"Wishing I Was Lucky"	3:52
6.	"Shed a Tear"	4:38
7.	"Goodnight Girl"	3:40
8.	"Sweet Surrender" (7" version)	4:22
9.	"Temptation" (edited version†)	3:58
10.	"More Than Love"	4:21
11.	"Sweet Little Mystery"	3:42
12.	"Angel Eyes" (single version)	4:30

† Edited to replace the line "don't waste my fucking spirit" with "don't waste my angry spirit"

== Charts ==
=== Weekly charts ===
Weekly chart performance for End of Part One: Their Greatest Hits
Chart (1993–1994)	Peak position
Australian Albums (ARIA)	2
Austrian Albums (Ö3 Austria)	1
Dutch Albums (Album Top 100)	1
German Albums (Offizielle Top 100)	1
Hungarian Albums (MAHASZ)	13
New Zealand Albums (RMNZ)	1
Norwegian Albums (VG-lista)	3
Swedish Albums (Sverigetopplistan)	1
Swiss Albums (Schweizer Hitparade)	5
UK Albums (OCC)	1

=== Year-end charts ===
1993 year-end chart performance for End of Part One: Their Greatest Hits
Chart (1993)	Position
UK Albums (OCC)	13

1994 year-end chart performance for End of Part One: Their Greatest Hits
Chart (1994)	Position
Australian Albums (ARIA)	18
Austrian Albums (Ö3 Austria)	15
Dutch Albums (Album Top 100)	3
German Albums (Offizielle Top 100)	15
New Zealand Albums (RMNZ)	13
Swiss Albums (Schweizer Hitparade)	25

1995 year-end chart performance for End of Part One: Their Greatest Hits
Chart (1995)	Position
Dutch Albums (Album Top 100)	30

== Certifications ==
Certifications for End of Part One: Their Greatest Hits
Region	Certification	Certified units/sales
Australia (ARIA)	Platinum	70,000^{^}
Austria (IFPI Austria)	Gold	25,000^{*}
Belgium (BRMA)	Platinum	50,000^{*}
Denmark (IFPI Danmark)	3× Platinum	240,000^{^}
Finland (Musiikkituottajat)	Gold	34,486
France (SNEP)	Gold	100,000^{*}
Germany (BVMI)	Platinum	500,000^{^}
Ireland (IRMA)	4× Platinum	60,000^{^}
Netherlands (NVPI)	2× Platinum	200,000^{^}
Norway (IFPI Norway)	Platinum	50,000^{*}
Spain (Promusicae)	Platinum	100,000^{^}
Sweden (GLF)	Platinum	100,000^{^}
Switzerland (IFPI Switzerland)	Platinum	50,000^{^}
United Kingdom (BPI)	3× Platinum	900,000^{^}
^{*} Sales figures based on certification alone.^{^} Shipments figures based on certification alone.
