= Goodnight Girl =

1991 single by Wet Wet Wet

Single by Wet Wet Wet

from the album High on the Happy Side
- B-side: "Ambrose Wykes"
- Released: 23 December 1991
- Length: 3:41
- Label: The Precious Organisation
- Songwriters: Marti Pellow; Tommy Cunningham; Graeme Clark; Neil Mitchell
- Producer: Wet Wet Wet

Wet Wet Wet singles chronology
"Put the Light On" (1991)	"Goodnight Girl" (1991)	"More than Love" (1992)

Music video
- "Goodnight Girl" on YouTube

"Goodnight Girl" is the third single from Scottish band Wet Wet Wet's fourth studio album, High on the Happy Side (1992). It was released on 23 December 1991 by label The Precious Organisation and was the second of the band's three UK number-one singles (the first being a cover of the Beatles' "With a Little Help from My Friends"), but the only one to be self-penned. Writer Graeme Clark was inspired to write the song for his then girlfriend, but has never publicly named her.

A string-laden ballad, "Goodnight Girl" spent four weeks at number one on the UK Singles Chart in January 1992, representing a turnaround in fortunes for the band, with the first two singles from High on the Happy Side having peaked at numbers 37 and 56 respectively. It also gave Wet Wet Wet their third Irish number-one single (after "With a Little Help from My Friends" and "Sweet Surrender") and reached the top 10 in Belgium and the Netherlands. Marti Pellow recorded his own version of the song for inclusion on his 2002 album Marti Pellow Sings the Hits of Wet Wet Wet & Smile.

== Track listings ==
=== Original release ===
- UK CD1
1. "Goodnight Girl"
2. "With a Little Help from My Friends"
3. "Sweet Surrender"
4. "Goodnight Girl" (No Strings Attached version)
- UK CD2
1. "Goodnight Girl"
2. "Wishing I Was Lucky"
3. "Temptation" (The Memphis Sessions version)
4. "Angel Eyes (Home and Away)"
- UK cassette single
1. "Goodnight Girl"
2. "Ambrose Wykes"
- UK 7-inch single

A1. "Goodnight Girl"
B1. "Ambrose Wykes"
B2. "Put the Light On" (acoustic version) (hidden track)

- Dutch 12-inch vinyl

A1. "Goodnight Girl"
B1. "Temptation" (The Memphis Sessions version)
B2. "With a Little Help from My Friends"

=== "Goodnight Girl '94" ===
- European CD and Japanese mini-CD single
1. "Goodnight Girl '94"
2. "Love Is All Around" (MTV Most Wanted version)
- European limited-edition two-CD single

CD1

1. "Goodnight Girl '94"
2. "Love Is All Around" (MTV Most Wanted version)
3. "Goodnight Girl"

CD2

1. "Shed a Tear"
2. "Put the Light On"
3. "Wishing I Was Lucky" (Arthur Baker '93 7-inch remix)
- Australian CD and cassette single
1. "Goodnight Girl '94"
2. "Love Is All Around" (MTV Most Wanted version)
3. "Goodnight Girl" (original version)
- US CD and cassette single
1. "Goodnight Girl" (remix) – 3:39
2. "Love Is All Around" (MTV Most Wanted version) – 4:22

== Charts ==
=== "Goodnight Girl" ===
==== Weekly charts ====
Chart (1991–1992)	Peak position
Australia (ARIA)	21
Austria (Ö3 Austria Top 40)	27
Belgium (Ultratop 50 Flanders)	7
Europe (Eurochart Hot 100)	6
Germany (GfK)	35
Ireland (IRMA)	1
Luxembourg (Radio Luxembourg)	15
Netherlands (Dutch Top 40)	2
Netherlands (Single Top 100)	2
New Zealand (Recorded Music NZ)	33
UK Singles (Official Charts)	1
UK Airplay (Music Week)	2
Zimbabwe (ZIMA)	3

==== Year-end charts ====
Chart (1992)	Position
Belgium (Ultratop)	84
Europe (Eurochart Hot 100)	54
Netherlands (Dutch Top 40)	18
Netherlands (Single Top 100)	25
UK Singles (OCC)	10
UK Airplay (Music Week)	40

=== "Goodnight Girl '94" ===
Chart (1994)	Peak position
Australia (ARIA)	26
Belgium (Ultratop 50 Flanders)	15
Denmark (IFPI)	7
Europe (Eurochart Hot 100)	50
Germany (GfK)	46
Iceland (Íslenski Listinn Topp 40)	11
Netherlands (Dutch Top 40)	11
Netherlands (Single Top 100)	14
New Zealand (Recorded Music NZ)	24
Switzerland (Schweizer Hitparade)	12

== Release history ==
Region	Version	Date	Format(s)	Label(s)	Ref.
United Kingdom	"Goodnight Girl"	23 December 1991	7-inch vinyl; CD; cassette	The Precious Organisation	
Australia	"Goodnight Girl"	9 March 1992	CD; cassette	The Precious Organisation	
Australia	"Goodnight Girl '94"	26 September 1994	CD; cassette	The Precious Organisation	
Japan	"Goodnight Girl '94"	26 November 1994	Mini-CD	The Precious Organisation	
