= More than Love =

1992 single by Wet Wet Wet

Single by Wet Wet Wet

from the album High on the Happy Side
- Released: 9 March 1992
- Length: 4:21 (album version); 4:25 (ET mix)
- Label: The Precious Organisation
- Songwriters: Graeme Clark; Tommy Cunningham; Neil Mitchell; Marti Pellow
- Producer: Wet Wet Wet

Wet Wet Wet singles chronology
"Goodnight Girl" (1991)	"More than Love" (1992)	"Lip Service" (1992)

"More than Love" is a song by Scottish band Wet Wet Wet, released on 9 March 1992 by label The Precious Organisation as the fourth single from their fourth studio album, High on the Happy Side (1992). It reached number 19 on the UK Singles Chart and number nine in the Netherlands.

== Track listings ==
- 7-inch and cassette single
1. "More than Love" (ET mix) – 4:25
2. "Goodnight Girl" (Rhythm mix) – 3:39
- CD1
1. "More than Love" (ET mix) – 4:25
2. "Sweet Little Mystery" (Memphis Sessions) – 3:37
3. "Broke Away" – 4:47
4. "Goodnight Girl" (Rhythm mix) – 3:39
- CD2
1. "More than Love" (ET mix) – 4:25
2. "Make It Tonight" (ET mix) – 4:18
3. "This Time" (Memphis Sessions) – 4:19
4. "Perfect Lie" – 3:53

== Charts ==
Chart (1992)	Peak position
Belgium (Ultratop 50 Flanders)	20
Europe (Eurochart Hot 100)	58
Ireland (IRMA)	24
Netherlands (Dutch Top 40)	9
Netherlands (Single Top 100)	13
UK Singles (OCC)	19
UK Airplay (Music Week)	9
