= Marti Pellow Sings the Hits of Wet Wet Wet & Smile =

Compilation album by Marti Pellow
- Released: 18 November 2002 (UK)
- Genre: Pop
- Label: Universal Records

Marti Pellow chronology
Smile (2001)	Marti Pellow Sings the Hits of Wet Wet Wet & Smile (2002)	Between the Covers (2003)

Marti Pellow Sings the Hits of Wet Wet Wet & Smile is a compilation/cover album by Wet Wet Wet frontman Marti Pellow. The album contains re-recordings of Wet Wet Wet hits. It was released on 18 November 2002.

Three of the eighteen songs were taken directly from his debut album, 2001's Smile. These were the only tracks not to be re-recorded.

== Chart performance ==
In Scotland, the album debuted at number 24 on the Scottish Album Chart. It peaked at number 18 a week later and went on to spend 15 weeks on the chart.

In the United Kingdom, the album debuted at number 34, reaching a peak of number 34 two weeks later on 14 December 2002. The album went on to spend 11 weeks non-consecutively on this chart.

== Track listing ==
1. "Love Is All Around" (Reg Presley)
2. "Wishing I Was Lucky" (Wet Wet Wet)
3. "Angel Eyes (Home and Away)" (Wet Wet Wet)
4. "Sweet Little Mystery" (Wet Wet Wet)
5. "Julia Says" (Wet Wet Wet)
6. "Sweet Surrender" (Wet Wet Wet)
7. "With a Little Help from My Friends" (The Beatles)
8. "Goodnight Girl" (Wet Wet Wet)
9. "If I Never See You Again" (Wet Wet Wet)
10. "Strange" (Wet Wet Wet)
11. "Close to You" (from Smile)
12. "Temptation" (Wet Wet Wet)
13. "Yesterday/Maybe I'm in Love" (The Beatles/Wet Wet Wet)
14. "She's All on My Mind" (Wet Wet Wet)
15. "Hard to Cry" (from Smile)
16. "Don't Want to Forgive Me Now" (Wet Wet Wet)
17. "I've Been Around the World" (from Smile)
18. "Somewhere Somehow" (Wet Wet Wet)

=== Weekly charts ===
2002 weekly chart performance for Marti Pellow Sings the Hits of Wet Wet Wet & Smile
Chart (2002)	Peak position
Scottish Albums Chart	18
UK Albums (OCC)	34
