= Hold Back the River =

Hold Back the River may refer to:

- Holding Back the River, a 1989 album by Wet Wet Wet
  - "Hold Back the River" (Wet Wet Wet song), a song from the above album
- "Hold Back the River" (James Bay song)
