= Cold Cold Heart (Wet Wet Wet song) =

Single by Wet Wet Wet

from the album End of Part One: Their Greatest Hits
- Released: 27 December 1993 (UK)
- Genre: Pop
- Length: 3:53
- Label: The Precious Organisation; PolyGram
- Songwriter(s): Graeme Clark; Tommy Cunningham; Neil Mitchell; Marti Pellow
- Producer(s): Nile Rodgers

Wet Wet Wet singles chronology
"Shed a Tear" (1993)	"Cold Cold Heart" (1993)	"Love Is All Around" (1994)

Music video
- "Cold Cold Heart" on YouTube

"Cold Cold Heart" is a song by Scottish soft rock band Wet Wet Wet, recorded as a new track for their first greatest hits album, End of Part One (1993). It was produced by Nile Rodgers and released as a single on 27 December 1993, by The Precious Organisation and PolyGram, reaching number 20 on the UK Singles Chart. The song features background vocals by an uncredited French-speaking female. She is featured in the song's video.

== Music video ==
The accompanying music video for "Cold Cold Heart" was directed by Pedro Romhanyi and produced by Steven Elliot for Oil Factory. It was released on 27 December 1993 and based on a lost in space with Barbarella-concept.

== Track listings ==
- CD 1
1. "Cold Cold Heart"
2. "Roll 'Um Easy"
3. "Cold Cold Heart" (Youth mix)
4. "Cold Cold Heart" (Arthur Baker remix)
- CD 2
1. "Cold Cold Heart"
2. "Another Love in Me"
3. "Wishing I Was Lucky" (Arthur Baker remix 93-12")
4. "Cold Cold Heart" (Arthur Baker remix 93-7")
- MC
1. "Cold Cold Heart"
2. "Roll 'Um Easy"
3. "Cold Cold Heart" (Arthur Baker remix 93)
- 7"
1. "Cold Cold Heart"
2. "Roll 'Um Easy"
3. "Cold Cold Heart" (Arthur Baker remix 93)

== Charts ==
Chart (1994)	Peak position
UK Singles (OCC)	20
UK Airplay (Music Week)	12
