= Holding Back the River =

Studio album by Wet Wet Wet
- Released: 30 October 1989
- Recorded: 1988–1989
- Genres: Soft rock; sophisti-pop; blue-eyed soul
- Length: 48:58
- Label: Mercury
- Producer: Wet Wet Wet

Wet Wet Wet chronology
The Memphis Sessions (1988)	Holding Back the River (1989)	Wet Wet Wet: Live (1990)

Singles from Holding Back the River
- 1. "Sweet Surrender" Released: 18 September 1989; 2. "Broke Away" Released: 27 November 1989; 3. "Hold Back the River" Released: 26 February 1990; 4. "Stay with Me Heartache" Released: 30 July 1990

Holding Back the River is the second studio album released by the Scottish pop rock quartet Wet Wet Wet. Released on 30 October 1989, the album, intentionally written as a lyrical follow-up to the band's debut album Popped In Souled Out, spawned the singles "Sweet Surrender", "Broke Away", "Hold Back the River" and "Stay With Me Heartache" and peaked at #2 on the UK Albums Chart.

Aside from the nine tracks found on the standard album, "How the Hell Did They Get There" appears as a hidden track on the CD and digital download versions, having previously been released as a B-side to the album's lead single, "Sweet Surrender". Outside of the UK, the album saw particular success in Australia, where it was certified Gold and re-released in the form of a limited edition coloured vinyl.

"Broke Away" was released on 27 November 1989, entering the charts at number 39 the following Sunday. It peaked four weeks later at number 19.

== Recording ==
Holding Back the River was recorded on and off over six months at Peter Gabriel's Real World Studios, Wiltshire, in 1989, with the band writing, recording, playing and producing the whole album. In this way it marks a departure from their slick, million-selling debut album Popped In Souled Out (1987), which was produced by an outside producer, Michael Baker. As Tommy Cunningham of the band told an interviewer in 1989: "You're starting to see us in our true colours now, because we're producing ourselves. I think it's time for us to prove how strong we are as a band. We do everything ourselves. I mean, we design our own album covers, we write our own video scripts — we do everything. So if it doesn't work out, there's only ourselves to blame".

Graeme Clark recalled that the band "wanted to get a bit of credibility", wishing to grow their hair out and "be a bit less manufactured", but the band's label Phonogram warned Wet Wet Wet that such a stylistic change would alienate their early fans: "We were headstrong and maybe they were right." Neil Mitchell, keyboardist, believes the band should have never self-produced the record. In a 1991 interview, singer Marti Pellow commented that "if a song doesn't hold itself together on just a piano or a guitar then there is no song. These days technology means you can polish a shite." According to Pellow, this is what happened when recording Holding Back the River — "we went mad with samples and things and used technology to shine a turd. But as soon as you take an over-produced song on the road, it falls apart. You can see the fucking holes in it. Production is just a way of getting away with it."

"The mistake," Pellow told an interviewer for Vox, "was spending 18 hours a day, six days a week in Peter Gabriel's studios. We were waiting for inspiration but it never came. We thought if we sat there long enough there would be a knock at the door, we'd open it and a guy would say, 'Hi! I'm Inspiration.'" The album's total production costs were £400,000.

== Composition ==
=== Musical style and themes ===
According to the reviewer Andrew Panois, Holding Back the River consolidates the band's "subtler and more soulful approach to their tunes", with heavy string and horn backings and "plaintive, soulful wailing throughout" from Pellow, as well as an absence of disco beats or mock house tunes. The album is dominated by romantic ballads, eschewing the more dance-oriented focus of the band's earlier work for "slushy strings, cosy close harmonies and Philadelphia horns." Despite this, there are occasional dance tracks, such as "You've Had It" and the chorus of "Can't Stand the Night". Ultimately, eight of the album's songs are lush ballads, with "a heavy orchestra backing" arranged by the group in collaboration with the Reggae Philharmonic Orchestra, who had a then-recent hit with "Minnie the Moocher". Another reviewer, Mike Soutar, noted the group had foregone the jaunty pop songs of their earlier work and had become "a proper soul outfit" with more mature songwriting. NME critic Angela Lewis remarks on the "ubiquitous swish of strings which came into lullaby pre-eminence" on the album.

Pellow described Holding Back the River as "a big boy's album — the arrangements and the structures of the songs are really good in our estimation. There's a song called 'Blue For You' where we used a 70-piece orchestra. It's more grown up and the lyrical content of the album is a lot more fulfilling for all of us. It's stronger, it feels like a progression. A lot of people will be really surprised." Cunningham noted that lyrical subjects on the album include trade unions (inspired by how they had become powerful in Poland in marked contrast to Britain, where the miners' strike had failed), the personal themes of "Blue for You", the "tide of change" explored on the title track, and a song about alcoholism ("and being Scottish, each of us has been in close contact with that.")

=== Songs ===
Pellow describes "Sweet Surrender" as "almost a dance record because it seemed the natural thing to do. When it was finished, we thought it had that sort of feel. It's coming at the tail end of summer and it has that lovers rock sort of feel. We've sort of been influenced by Africa, because a lot of African bands come in here all the time with WOMAD being close by. We've just been hanging out and listening to what's going on." Cunningham said of the song: "We've never really touched on dance before, but it's come about very naturally." The reviwer Lloyd Bradley calls the song "a rich tapestry of shifting patterns".

Two songs, "Blue for You" and "Broke Away", have been described as "almost mini symphonies". "Blue For You" is essentially a blues, using subtle orchestration (involving 40 instruments), an arrangement comparable to Burt Bacharach and Hal David, and a stirring gospel vocal. It has also been described as "an epic James Bond theme tune". In contrast, "Broke Away" is a bare lullaby and sparse ballad featuring harps, penny whistles and soothing vocals. A crisp dance song, "You've Had It" is the only uptempo song on the album, and has been compared to the music of Bobby Brown, Robert Palmer, and Wet Wet Wet's earlier hit "Sweet Little Mystery".

Elsewhere, Rod Stewart's "Maggie May" is covered as a heavy ballad. "Keys to Your Heart" is a rousing sing-along comparable to pub knees-ups, whereas "Can't Stand the Night" has a reggae lilt and a dance chorus. "I Wish" features a furious brass ensemble, and "Hold Back the River" is a blues song. Bradley comments that these two songs take influence from the group's sessions in Memphis, adding that both are drenched in horns and a Hammond organ, with the former also "[blending] in an acoustic guitar, and the latter is positively footstomping in its sanctification".

== Release and reception ==
=== Marketing and sales ===
The release of Holding Back the River was long-awaited. When four songs were previewed ahead of its release, journalist Edward J. Bernard descibred them "big, bold, bluesy numbers that will surprise many people" Cunningham said in a contemporary interview: "We want the young audience to start getting a bit more savvy about music — there's more to music than SAW, there's other things going on, and we're in a prime situation to deliver that." Unlike the band's debut, Holding Back the River was not released in the United States, following the closure of Uni Records in 1988.

"Sweet Surrender" was selected as the album's lead single, a "perfect" choice according to Pellow. In an interview, Pellow said that it was "not the obvious" choice of lead single, given that the band "wanted a sort of... lover's rock feel" for the song, but also commented, with regard to future singles from the album, that the group still had "a few aces left for the right time". Reviewer Mick Williams calls it a "perhaps misleading" choice of lead single as it is unrepresentative of the album as a whole.

Holding Back the River received negative reviews from music critics and sold less well than the band's million-selling debut, Popped In Sold Out (1987), prompting a "serious rethink" for the band going forward. Although "Sweet Surrender" and "Hold Back the River" were hits, their success was considered inevitable following the group's 1988 number-one cover of "With a Little Help from My Friends". As Pellow explained: "If we'd farted on vinyl the thing would have gone Top Ten." Mitchell comments that the album's poor sales "definitely gave us a kick in the arse. We should have never produced the second album ourselves. But you live and learn by your failures just as much as your successes". The album spent 26 weeks on the UK Albums Chart, peaking at number two.

=== Critical reviews ===
Professional ratings
Review scores
Source	Rating
Allmusic	4/5 stars
Cambridge Evening News	6/10
Encyclopedia of Popular Music	3/5 stars
The Lennox Herald	8/10
Number One	3.5/5 stars
Record Mirror	2.5/5 stars
Smash Hits	8.5/10

In his review of Holding Back the River, Gary Crossing of Record Mirror lamented the album's focus on ballads, calling it a "mainly dull plod through lovey-dovey land" that Pellow's voice is unable to disguise, and deemed it overproduced by the band. Crossing felt that, although lustful yuppies would choose the album for "a CD seduction", the band deserve better. The Daily Telegraph's Tim Rostron said the album announces, from its "sensible title" onwards, that it will be a "much more important opus" than Popped In Souled Out, but "the slick production and elaborately orchestrated arrangements fail to coax a masterpiece out of the raw material: enervated, po-faced white soul." Chris Lloyd of The Northern Echo wrote that, like Curiosity Killed the Cat, Wet Wet Wet were looking to "break out of the teenage market" and become accepted as a genuine modern soul band, yet had made "no progress", deeming the record to be "as sickening as Esther Rantzen's Hearts of Gold."

Q critic Lloyd Bradley believed that the record fulfilled the band's potential: "With relaxed, bluesy tempos, warmly balanced textures and oozing, churchy vocals," Bradley wrote, "Holding Back the River lets flow an unforced soulfulness which proves that they not only understand precisely what they should be doing, but that they have the skill to capture it on record." Mike Soutar of Smash Hits believed the combination of self-production and more 'mature' songwriting meant Holding Back the River sounds very different from Popped In Souled Out, eschewing jaunty pop songs for "proper soul music"; Soutar praised the album's first side but found side two more suspect. In Number One, Andrew Panos noted the album's lush, orchestral sound but opined that, although it was "a refreshing change to see such a popular band take a bit of a risk with the type of tunes on this album", the members were arguably too young to make such a "very mature sounding album", believing they risked succumbing to their own hype about being a "great British soul band".

Mick Williams of The Lennox Herald said the album saw Wet Wet Wet tackle the sophomore slump by abandoning the "upbeat soul/pop" of Popped In Souled Out, instead delivering "a collection of songs firmly in the AOR/MOR mould, and pretty good it is too", praising its "much more mature" sound. Helen M Jerome of The Independent called the album "a varied catch", praising several songs as "outstanding" but dismissing "Maggie May" as a feeble cover. Cambridge Evening News critic Marcus Hodge considered the brass on some songs to evidence the band's "new found maturity", but generally felt the album was slushy with "unnecessary punctuation". In a retrospective review, Jonathan Lewis of AllMusic considered Holding Back the River to be "a collection of pleasant, melodic, somewhat lightweight pop songs topped by Marti Pellow's charismatic vocal delivery." Although Lewis found the group's pop approach largely successful, he felt Pellow's voice was not suited to several songs, meaning that while the album is enjoyable, it is not among the band's more essential recordings.

== Track listing ==
All tracks are written by Clark/Cunningham/Mitchell/Pellow, except "Maggie May", by Martin Quittenton & Rod Stewart. All tracks produced by Wet Wet Wet.

No.	Title	Length
1.	"Sweet Surrender"	6:00
2.	"Stay with Me Heartache (Can't Stand the Night)"	4:10
3.	"Blue for You"	4:51
4.	"Broke Away"	4:45
5.	"You've Had It"	5:12
6.	"I Wish"	5:04
7.	"Keys to Your Heart"	4:23
8.	"Maggie May"	6:02
9.	"Hold Back the River"	4:45
10.	"How the Hell Did That Get There" (hidden track)	3:38

Holding Back the River – B-Sides
No.	Title	Length
1.	"This Time" (live version)	4:59
2.	"Sweet Surrender" (extended version)	6:50
3.	"You've Had It" (Louis Silas club mix)	7:02
4.	"Sweet Surrender" (Ben Liebrand club mix)	6:51
5.	"And Now for Something Completely Different"	2:43
6.	"Keys to Your Heart" (original demo)	4:15
7.	"With a Little Help from My Friends" (live, Wembley Arena, 14/12/89)	5:11
8.	"I Can Give You Everything" (live, Wembley Arena, 14/12/89)	5:25
9.	"Party City"	5:05
10.	"I Feel Fine"	5:02
11.	"Hold Back the River" (acoustic)	4:15
12.	"Stay With Me Heartache" (Young T.C. & T mix)	5:58
13.	"Stay With Me Heartache" (Stay Where You Are mix)	4:35
14.	"Stoned Me" (Tonight Live with Steve Vizard)	4:07

== Charts ==
Weekly chart performance of Holding Back the River
Chart (1989–1990)	Peak position
Australian Albums (ARIA)	12
Dutch Albums (Album Top 100)	28
German Albums (Offizielle Top 100)	34
UK Albums (Official Charts)	2

Year-end chart performance of Holding Back the River
Chart (1990)	Position
European Albums (Music & Media)	94
