= Shed a Tear =

1993 single by Wet Wet Wet

Single by Wet Wet Wet

from the album End of Part One: Their Greatest Hits
- B-side: "Everyday"; "Deadline"
- Released: 25 October 1993
- Length: 4:43
- Label: The Precious Organisation
- Songwriters: Graeme Clark; Tommy Cunningham; Neil Mitchell; Marti Pellow
- Producer: Nile Rodgers

Wet Wet Wet singles chronology
| "Blue for You" / "This Time" (1993) | "Shed a Tear" (1993) | "Cold Cold Heart" (1993) |

Music video
- "Shed a Tear" on YouTube

"Shed a Tear" is a song by Scottish band Wet Wet Wet from their first greatest-hits album, End of Part One (1993). It was written by the band, produced by Nile Rodgers and released as a single on 25 October 1993, by label The Precious Organisation. The song reached number 22 on the UK Singles Chart and number 25 in Ireland.

== Track listings ==
- CD single
1. "Shed a Tear"
2. "Everyday"
3. "Deadline"
- 7-inch and cassette single
1. "Shed a Tear"
2. "Everyday"

== Charts ==
Weekly chart performance for "Shed a Tear"
| Chart (1993–1995) | Peak position |
|---|---|
| Australia (ARIA) | 70 |
| Europe (Eurochart Hot 100) | 56 |
| Europe (European Hit Radio) | 22 |
| Germany (GfK) | 53 |
| Ireland (IRMA) | 25 |
| UK Singles (OCC) | 22 |
| UK Airplay (Music Week) | 9 |

== Release history ==
Release dates and formats for "Shed a Tear"
| Region | Date | Format(s) | Label(s) | Ref. |
|---|---|---|---|---|
| United Kingdom | 25 October 1993 | 7-inch vinyl; CD; cassette | The Precious Organisation | |
| Australia | 17 January 1994 | CD; cassette | The Precious Organisation | |
