= Wet Wet Wet: Live =

Live album by Wet Wet Wet
- Released: December 1, 1990 (UK)
- Genre: Soft rock; sophisti-pop; blue-eyed soul

Wet Wet Wet chronology
Holding Back the River (1989)	Wet Wet Wet: Live (1990)	High on the Happy Side (1992)

Wet Wet Wet: Live is a live album by Wet Wet Wet. It was released on December 1, 1990. It was released on cassette only by The Precious Organisation. The performance was taken from The Big Day event in Glasgow.

John Aizlewood in Q Magazine described it as "pithily enjoyable and made sweeter by the low-key release".

== Track listing ==
1. "Get Ready"
2. "Brick House"
3. "Is This Love"
4. "I Feel Fine"
5. "You've Got a Friend"
6. "Second Hand News"
7. "Possession"
8. "With a Little Help from My Friends"
9. "Wishing I Was Lucky"
10. "H.T.H.D.T.G.T."
11. "Sweet Little Mystery"
