= Timeless (Wet Wet Wet album) =

Studio album by Wet Wet Wet
- Released: 12 November 2007
- Recorded: 2007
- Genre: Pop rock; soul
- Length: 45:28
- Label: Dry Records
- Producer: Graeme Clark

Wet Wet Wet chronology
The Greatest Hits (2004)	Timeless (2007)	Step by Step: The Greatest Hits (2013)

Singles from High on the Happy Side
- 1. "Too Many People" Released: 5 November 2007; 2. "Weightless" Released: 4 February 2008

Professional ratings
Review scores
Source	Rating
Allmusic	4/5 stars

Timeless is the sixth studio album by Scottish pop rock quartet Wet Wet Wet, and the last to feature Marti Pellow on lead vocals. Released on 12 November 2007, the album was the band's first studio release in ten years, having not released a full studio recording since 10 in 1997. The album spawned only two singles; "Too Many People", which was released a week before the album on 5 November, and "Weightless", which followed on 4 February 2008.

The album is the band's lowest charting release to date, only peaking at #42 on the UK Albums Chart. The album artwork was designed by Klaus Voormann, who also designed the artwork for The Beatles album Revolver. A total of sixteen new tracks were released as part of the album campaign; eleven on the album itself, and five additional new tracks as B-sides. An orchestral version of "Eyes Wide Open" appears as a hidden track on physical copies of the album.

== Track listing ==
All tracks are written by Clark/Cunningham/Mitchell/Pellow.

No.	Title	Length
1.	"Run"	3:50
2.	"Thru' the Night"	3:39
3.	"Weightless"	4:14
4.	"Real Life"	4:46
5.	"Eyes Wide Open"	4:52
6.	"In Every Heart (A Fire Burns)"	4:06
7.	"Too Many People"	4:35
8.	"I Believe"	3:40
9.	"Heaven"	3:59
10.	"New Age Sacrifice"	3:47
11.	"What Do You Know"	4:00
12.	"Eyes Wide Open" (Orchestral) (hidden track)	4:53

Weightless — B-Sides
No.	Title	Length
1.	"Sail On"	3:47
2.	"Luv of a Woman"	4:10
3.	"Beautiful Girl"	3:53
4.	"Give it All Away"	3:01
5.	"Stay"	3:13

== Charts ==
Chart performance for Timeless
Chart (2007)	Peak position
UK Albums (OCC)	41
