= Wet Wet Wet: Live at the Royal Albert Hall =

Live at the Royal Albert Hall

Live album by Wet Wet Wet
- Released: 17 May 1993
- Recorded: 3 November 1992
- Venue: Royal Albert Hall, London
- Genre: Pop, pop rock
- Label: The Precious Organisation
- Producer: Wet Wet Wet; Nick Davis

Wet Wet Wet chronology
High on the Happy Side (1992)	Live at the Royal Albert Hall (1993)	End of Part One: Their Greatest Hits (1993)

Singles from Live at the Royal Albert Hall
- 1. "Blue for You / This Time" Released: 26 April 1993

Live at the Royal Albert Hall is the second live album released by Scottish pop rock quartet Wet Wet Wet. Released on 17 May 1993, the album is a recording of the band's 3 November 1992 concert at the Royal Albert Hall in London, where they were accompanied on stage by the 100-piece Wren Orchestra. Notably, the concert itself was only announced just days before it was due to take place, with the band having only been asked to perform at the venue three weeks previously. Subsequently, the band were only given three days to rehearse their entire set.

The album was released on CD, Cassette and Vinyl LP, and was preceded by the release of a double A-side live single, containing the tracks "Blue for You" and "This Time", on 26 April 1993. The album peaked at #10 on the UK Albums Chart, with a percentage of profits from every release going towards Nordoff Robbins Music Therapy. The live recording of "Blue for You" was later included on the band's first greatest hits compilation, End of Part One. A VHS video of the concert, containing additional interviews with the band, followed on 24 May 1993.

== Tracklisting ==
All tracks are written by Clark/Cunningham/Mitchell/Pellow, except "This Time", by Willie Mitchell and Ed Adams Jr

No.	Title	Length
1.	"Angel Eyes"	5:44
2.	"This Time"	5:16
3.	"Brand New Sunrise"	5:33
4.	"Hold Back the River"	4:55
5.	"Blue for You"	5:20
6.	"Goodnight Girl"	6:32
7.	"How Long"	4:39
8.	"East of the River"	4:12
9.	"I Can Give You Everything"	8:37

== Charts ==
Chart (1993)	Peak position
UK Albums Chart	10
