= Weightless (Wet Wet Wet song) =

2008 single by Wet Wet Wet

Single by Wet Wet Wet

from the album Timeless
- Released: 4 February 2008
- Length: 3:29
- Label: Dry
- Songwriters: Graeme Clark, Neil Mitchell, Marti Pellow
- Producer: Graeme Clark

Wet Wet Wet singles chronology
"Too Many People" (2007)	"Weightless" (2008)

"Weightless" is a song by Scottish group Wet Wet Wet. It is the second single lifted from their comeback album, Timeless. Released on 4 February 2008, it reached number 10 on the UK Singles Chart, becoming their first single to chart inside the UK top 10 since 1997. However, the following week it fell to number 96, making it the first-ever top 10 hit to spend just one week in the UK top 75. In Scotland, the song debuted at number one, becoming the band's second single to do so, after "Love Is All Around" in 1994. The next week, it did not make as big as a fall as it did on the UK Singles Chart, dropping to number 29. It spent three more weeks on the chart before leaving.

== Track listings ==
Standard CD single 1

1. Weightless (Single Mix)
2. Beautiful Girl

Standard CD single 2

1. Weightless (Single Mix)
2. Give It All Away
3. Stay

DVD single

1. Weightless (Single Mix)
2. Weightless (5.1 Remix)
3. Weightless promo video
4. Too Many People promo video
5. Exclusive video footage

== Charts ==
Chart (2008)	Peak position
Scotland Singles (OCC)	1
UK Singles (OCC)	10
