= The Memphis Sessions =

Compilation album by Wet Wet Wet
- Released: 7 November 1988
- Recorded: 1985–1986
- Studios: Royal Studios, Tennessee, United States
- Genres: Soul; southern soul; Americana
- Length: 34:38
- Label: Phonogram
- Producer: Willie Mitchell

Wet Wet Wet chronology
Popped in Souled Out (1987)	The Memphis Sessions (1988)	Holding Back the River (1989)

The Memphis Sessions is a compilation album by Scottish pop-rock quartet Wet Wet Wet. Released on 7 November 1988, the album features a number of tracks recorded during the early recording sessions for the band's debut studio album, Popped in Souled Out. The album contains three previously unreleased songs, as well as five alternative versions of songs from Popped in Souled Out.

The album was produced and mixed by Willie Mitchell at Royal Studios in Memphis, Tennessee. The album was originally shelved following the band's signing to Mercury Records, but was later released following the success of Popped in Souled Out. The album reached #3 in the UK Albums Chart.

== Background ==
The Memphis sessions took place over two months in mid-1986 with veteran Al Green producer Willie Mitchell in his Royal Studios in Tennessee, and Wet Wet Wet were "given every opportunity to let rip and prove themselves to be the soul band they insist they are." The band's label, Phonogram, had initially turned down their suggestion to work with Mitchell for their debut album as he had not produced hits since the mid-1970s, instead booking ill-fated sessions with John Ryan and then Stephen Hague. After these sessions failed, Phonogram became desperate and allowed Wet Wet Wet the trip to Memphis to record with Mitchell.

Based in the black neighborhood of Memphis, Royal Studios used a 16-track recorder and few modern conveniences as Mitchell disliked newer recording technology. Mitchell opened the group up to "far deeper and far more demanding approaches to making music than they had ever dreamt of", and the two parties enjoyed working with each other, with Mitchell deeming them "a number one soul band", praising their "unique" chord changes, musical movements and singer Marti Pellow's voice. Ann Peebles and Carla Thomas were on hand as musical assistants, and there is a "requisite funky atmosphere" to the music. It has also been called one of the group's Americana albums.

Although their first recorded album, The Memphis Sessions became "the WWW album that never was", because Phonogram were horrified when they heard the recordings and rejected them. As two journalists later described it, the recordings "were simply not commercial enough for the British record buying public". Although Mitchell believed the recordings went unreleased because they were "too black", Q writer Phil Sutcliffe comments that "the reservations were more about his uncomfortable work with synthesizers on up-tempo numbers where the beloved sound of the old Memphis horns and strings was called for. When the euphoria faded the band accepted the verdict while gradually settling into the realisation that Memphis was anything but a failure. It was the greatest learning experience of their lives." Instead, the group headed to another studio to record what became their actual debut album, Popped In Souled Out (1987), which had a pop sheen and was a major commercial success, reaching number one in Britain.

Upon its eventual late 1988 release, The Memphis Session was only issued by Phonogram at the band's behest, at a discount price. A mini-LP, it was put together in time for the Christmas market, and disguised to resemble a bootleg. Five of the eight songs also appear in re-recorded form on Popped In Souled Out. Two more are cover versions, leaving "For You Are" the only original Wet Wet Wet song on the album to not have appeared on record before. Tommy Cunningham of Wet Wet Wet later reflected:

"We step on stage, and obviously we're not four black guys from Detroit doing the moves, but intrinsically the music is always about soul. So, Memphis Sessions was our attempt to get an authentic soul album, but it wasn't commercial enough for the '80s, so we had to redo it in a pop structure – Popped in Souled Out – full of hits, and then release The Memphis Sessions to say; 'yes we're a pop band, but remember we are this as well'."

Vox's Bruce Dessau writes that, commercially, "The Memphis Sessions did okay, particularly when you consider that Phonogram didn't even want it released." Although intended as an "in-betweenie" album, it reached number 13 on the European Top 100 Albums chart, and peaked at number three on the UK Album Chart, spending 13 weeks on the chart overall.

== Critical reception ==
Professional ratings
Review scores
Source	Rating
Encyclopedia of Popular Music	2/5 stars
Evening Herald	3/5 stars
Gloucestershire Echo	8/10
Record Mirror	3/5 stars
Smash Hits	7/10

Among contemporary reviews, Caroline Rawlinson and Hilary Jennings of the Gloucestershire Echo felt that, due to Mitchell's production, The Memphis Sessions is "subsequently much more soulful" than Popped In Souled Out and proof that "there is much more to this band than first impressions would lead you to believe", writing that the level of feeling in the recordings "reveals that this less commercial sound is really where the heart of Wet, Wet, Wet lies." Mark Soutar of Smash Hits wrote that the quality of the Memphis versions of the band's songs prevents the release from being "a huge gigantic swindle", commenting that Pellow "bellows and blusters and shows what a lungsmith he truly is and the rest of the group chug and jangle along at the same time." For reviewer Ian Calvert of Evening Herald, the album revealed how superior the band were before their fame with a teen image, deeming it "a great listen with lots of feeling – which is not something you can say about the new glossy Wets."

Deeming it a vanity release for the band, Melody Maker critic Caroline Sullivan found the album "not bad" but still quite undistinguished, observing how Mitchell's ingenuity is unable undercut the earnestness that characterises the whole album. "Their technique suggests great familiarity with, and love of, the Stax catalogue," she writes, "without the ability to forge ahead and impress their own identity onto the music. They sound like what they were: four teenagers who'd scarcely been outside Glasgow, awed by their surroundings and intimidated into solemnity as a result." Similarly, Cambridge Evening News critic Marcus Hodge wrote that Wet Wet Wet wished to disregard their 'teenie' image by showing they have a genuine depth, but lamented that their soul music is "too slick and too indistinguished and despite their honest endeavour it never convinces", adding that the group should abandon their soulful aspirations and return to pop.

Record Mirror critic Jim Reid described The Memphis Sessions as an "odd mix of deep Southern soul and British pop melody," and thus highly unlike "the sanitised slop of the group's official debut, Popped In, Souled Out, whose songs are included here in radically different form." While finding Memphis the superior album, he feels it illustrates how the group unconvince as a "raw to the bone outfit" because, as the music is much closer to genuine, understated soul music, Pellow's voice feels phoney: "In the rawer, rootsier context of Mitchell's production, Pellow's voice is exposed." Reid felt that the band's "struggle for some kind of 'authenticity' is almost as futile as their string of hits." Mark Barden of Weekend Echo felt that Wet Wet Wet were "doing a spot of hero worshipping" by working with Mitchell and found the album interesting, noting how radically different several songs are from the "later, glossier versions" on Popped In Souled Out. Barden says the album "sounds like a work in progress in places" but is likeable for showcasing "four raw Glasgow boys paying homage to one of their heroes." Clydebank Post named it their "album of the week".

== Legacy ==
The Memphis Sessions marked an artistic milestone in Wet Wet Wet's career; by becoming the first white group to record with Mitchell, they were able to overcome their teenybopper image and become "acceptable to grown-up pop fans for the very first time", according to Robert Tilli of Music & Media. Wet Wet Wet's manager Elliott Davis said the Mitchell collaboration helped challenge prejudices against the band; saying "a lot of people took the band more seriously from that point." Davis added that the group themselves had not changed radically, but rather audiences "just altered their perception, which was incorrect at the beginning." In 2006, Pellow released the solo soul album Moonlight Over Memphis, which saw him return to Memphis with Mitchell as producer.

== Track listing ==
All tracks are written by Clark/Cunningham/Mitchell/Pellow, except "This Time", by Willie Mitchell and Ed Adams Jr., and "Heaven Help Us All", by Ron Miller. All tracks produced by Wet Wet Wet.

No.	Title	Length
1.	"I Don't Believe (Sonny's Letter)" (Memphis Sessions version)	4:08
2.	"Sweet Little Mystery" (Memphis Sessions version)	3:34
3.	"East of the River" (Memphis Sessions version)	3:39
4.	"This Time"	4:16
5.	"Temptation" (Memphis Sessions version)	3:47
6.	"I Remember" (Memphis Sessions version)	4:41
7.	"For You Are"	4:24
8.	"Heaven Help Us All"	3:51

== Charts ==
Chart (1988)	Peak position	Certification
UK Albums Chart	3	Platinum
Netherlands (MegaCharts)	9	—
