= Overproduction (music) =

Criticism of record production

In music production, overproduction is a term used to express subjective criticism of the results of the recording process. Overproduction may refer to the excessive use of audio effects, layering or digital manipulation, or it may refer to the absence of normal performance imperfections or spontaneity.

== See also ==
- Wall of Sound
