= Audio effect =

Audio effect may refer to:

- Sound effect, a recorded or performed sound for a movie or play
- Modification of sound produced by an effects unit

== See also ==
- Audio signal processing
