= 10 (Wet Wet Wet album) =

Studio album by Wet Wet Wet
- Released: 31 March 1997
- Recorded: 1996–1997
- Genre: Pop, pop rock
- Length: 50:17
- Label: Mercury
- Producer: Graeme Clark, Graeme Duffin

Wet Wet Wet chronology
Picture This (1995)	10 (1997)	The Greatest Hits (2004)

Alternative album cover
- 10 Again edition

Singles from 10
- 1. "If I Never See You Again" Released: 10 March 1997; 2. "Strange" Released: 2 June 1997; 3. "Yesterday/Maybe I'm in Love" Released: 4 August 1997

Professional ratings
Review scores
Source	Rating
Allmusic	2.5/5 stars
NME	1/10

10 is the fifth studio album by the Scottish pop-rock quartet Wet Wet Wet. Released on 31 March 1997, the album marked a decade since the release of the band's debut album, Popped in Souled Out.

Notably, 10 was the last studio album to be released by the band before their initial split in 1997. The album spawned three singles: "If I Never See You Again", "Strange", and the double A-side "Yesterday/Maybe I'm in Love", of which "Yesterday" only appeared on the 10 Again and 1998 re-issues of the album. The album reached #2 on the UK Albums Chart.

== Track listings ==
All tracks are written by Clark/Cunningham/Mitchell/Pellow, except "If I Never See You Again" and "The Only Sounds" by Pellow/Clark/Terry Britten/Graham Lyle, "Yesterday" by John Lennon/Paul McCartney and "Beyond the Sea" by Charles Trenet/Jack Lawrence.

No.	Title	Length
1.	"If I Never See You Again"	3:50
2.	"Back on My Feat"	3:30
3.	"Fool for Your Love"	3:32
4.	"The Only Sounds"	5:12
5.	"If Only I Could Be with You"	4:22
6.	"I Want You"	4:17
7.	"Maybe I'm in Love"	3:14
8.	"Beyond the Sea"	3:56
9.	"Lonely Girl"	5:13
10.	"Strange"	4:01
11.	"Theme from Ten"	2:20
12.	"It Hurts"	4:50

10 — 10 Again Bonus Disc
No.	Title	Length
1.	"Strange" (radio edit)	3:44
2.	"Lonely Girl" (Live at FFH Germany)
3.	"Love is All Around" (Live at Hook End)
4.	"If I Never See You Again" (Live at Hook End)
5.	"Yesterday" (single version)	2:48
6.	"Maybe I'm in Love" (Live at Hook End)
7.	"Beyond the Sea" (Live at Hook End)

10 — 1998 Reissue
No.	Title	Length
1.	"Strange" (radio edit)	3:44
2.	"Lonely Girl"	5:13
3.	"If I Never See You Again"	3:50
4.	"Yesterday" (single version)	2:48
5.	"The Only Sounds"	5:12
6.	"If Only I Could Be with You"	4:22
7.	"Back on My Feat"	3:30
8.	"Fool for Your Love"	3:32
9.	"Maybe I'm in Love"	3:14
10.	"Beyond the Sea"	3:56
11.	"I Want You"	4:17
12.	"Theme from Ten"	2:20
13.	"It Hurts"	4:50

10 — B-Sides
No.	Title	Length
1.	"Straight From My Heart"	4:37
2.	"Qu'est-ce Que C'est"	2:50
3.	"Theme from Grand Prix"	2:58

== Charts ==
Chart performance for 10
Chart (1997)	Peak position
Austrian Albums (Ö3 Austria)	28
Dutch Albums (Album Top 100)	22
German Albums (Offizielle Top 100)	30
Swiss Albums (Schweizer Hitparade)	50
UK Albums (OCC)	2

== Certifications ==
Certifications for 10
Region	Certification	Certified units/sales
United Kingdom (BPI)	Platinum	300,000^{^}
^{^} Shipments figures based on certification alone.
