= Hold Back the River (Wet Wet Wet song) =

1990 single by Wet Wet Wet

Single by Wet Wet Wet

from the album Holding Back the River
- Released: 26 February 1990
- Length: 4:50
- Label: The Precious Organisation; Phonogram
- Songwriter(s): Graeme Clark; Tommy Cunningham; Neil Mitchell; Marti Pellow
- Producer(s): Wet Wet Wet

Wet Wet Wet singles chronology
"Broke Away" (1989)	"Hold Back the River" (1990)	"Stay with Me Heartache (Can't Stand the Night)" (1990)

"Hold Back the River" is a song by Scottish band Wet Wet Wet. It was released on 26 February 1990 as the third single from their third studio album, Holding Back the River (1989). The song peaked at number 31 on the UK Singles Chart and number 16 on the Irish Singles Chart.

== Track listings ==
- CD and 12-inch
1. "Hold Back the River" ― 4:48
2. "Keys to Your Heart" (Original Demo) ― 4:15
3. "With a Little Help from My Friends" (Live, Wembley Arena, 14th December 1989) ― 5:11
- 7-inch and cassette
1. "Hold Back the River" ― 4:48
2. "Keys to Your Heart" (Original Demo) ― 4:15
- Limited-edition 12-inch
1. "Hold Back the River" ― 4:48
2. "Keys to Your Heart" (Original Demo) ― 4:15
3. "Party City" ― 5:05
4. "I Can Give You Everything" (Live, Wembley Arena, 14th December 1989) ― 5:25

== Charts ==
Chart (1990)	Peak position
Europe (Eurochart Hot 100)	82
Ireland (IRMA)	16
UK Singles (OCC)	31
