= Temptation (Wet Wet Wet song) =

Single by Wet Wet Wet

from the album Popped In Souled Out
- Released: 7 March 1988 (UK)
- Recorded: 1986
- Genre: Soft rock
- Length: 5:01 (album version); 3:59 (single version)
- Label: PolyGram
- Songwriters: Marti Pellow, Tommy Cunningham, Graeme Clark, Neil Mitchell

Wet Wet Wet singles chronology
"Angel Eyes" (1987)	"Temptation" (1988)	"With a Little Help from My Friends" (1988)

"Temptation" is the fourth and final single from Wet Wet Wet's debut album, Popped In Souled Out. It was released on 7 March 1988, and reached number 12 on the UK Singles Chart.

Three versions of the song have been released. The original album version contains a longer middle eight than the single version, which also contains the expletive "don't waste my fucking spirit". The single version has this edited to "don't waste my angry spirit", and was also the version played on radio. The radio edit version is also used in End of Part One: Their Greatest Hits.

Marti Pellow recorded his own version of the song for inclusion on his 2002 album Marti Pellow Sings the Hits of Wet Wet Wet & Smile, but once again contains the expletive line within the middle eight from the original Wet Wet Wet version.

== Track listings ==
CD:

1. "Temptation" (extended version)
2. "Bottled Emotions"
3. "I Remember" (extended version)
4. "Heaven Help Us All"

7":

1. "Temptation"
2. "Bottled Emotions"

12":

1. "Temptation"
2. "Bottled Emotions"
3. "I Remember" (extended version)

== Charts ==
=== Weekly charts ===
Chart (1988)	Peak position
Ireland (IRMA)	8
Italy Airplay (Music & Media)	7
UK Singles (OCC)	12
