= Angel Eyes (Home and Away) =

1987 single by Wet Wet Wet

Single by Wet Wet Wet

from the album Popped In Souled Out
- Released: 23 November 1987
- Length: 5:16 (album version); 4:30 (single version)
- Label: The Precious Organisation; Mercury
- Songwriters: Graeme Clark; Tommy Cunningham; Neil Mitchell; Marti Pellow; Chris Difford
- Producers: Michael Baker; Axel Kroll

Wet Wet Wet singles chronology
"Sweet Little Mystery" (1987)	"Angel Eyes (Home and Away)" (1987)	"Temptation" (1988)

"Angel Eyes (Home and Away)" is the third single from Scottish band Wet Wet Wet's first album, Popped In Souled Out (1987). It was released in November 1987. The lyrics in the chorus make reference to two Hal David and Burt Bacharach compositions "Walk On By" and "The Look of Love", and quote an entire verse of the Squeeze single "Heartbreaking World". Some later issues of this single (including all of the US issues) accordingly credit the Squeeze lyricist Chris Difford as a co-author.

"Angel Eyes" reached number five in the UK Singles Chart in January 1988 and also peaked at number nine in Ireland. Later in the year, the song charted in other countries, becoming a top-five hit in Belgium, the Netherlands, and New Zealand. Marti Pellow recorded his own version of the song for inclusion on his 2002 album Marti Pellow Sings the Hits of Wet Wet Wet & Smile. An earlier version of the song, entitled "Home and Away", was on the 1986 Glasgow band's compilation cassette Honey at the Core.

== Track listings ==
CD:

1. "Angel Eyes (Home and Away)" (full length version)
2. "We Can Love"
3. "Angel Eyes (Home and Away)" (original demo version)
4. "Angel Eyes (Home and Away)" (7-inch version)

Cassette:

1. "Angel Eyes (Home and Away)"
2. "We Can Love"
3. "Home & Away"
4. "Angel Eyes" (extended version)

7-inch:

1. "Angel Eyes (Home and Away)"
2. "We Can Love"

12-inch:

1. "Angel Eyes (Home and Away)"
2. "We Can Love"
3. "Home & Away"

== Charts ==
=== Weekly charts ===
Chart (1987–1989)	Peak position
Belgium (Ultratop 50 Flanders)	3
Europe (European Hot 100 Singles)	21
France (SNEP)	20
Ireland (IRMA)	9
Italy Airplay (Music & Media)	2
Netherlands (Dutch Top 40)	2
Netherlands (Single Top 100)	3
New Zealand (Recorded Music NZ)	4
South Africa (Springbok Radio)	13
Sweden (Sverigetopplistan)	17
UK Singles (Official Charts)	5
US Adult Contemporary (Billboard)	44
West Germany (GfK)	17

=== Year-end charts ===
Chart (1988)	Position
Belgium (Ultratop)	16
Europe (European Hot 100 Singles)	71
Netherlands (Dutch Top 40)	15
Netherlands (Single Top 100)	21

== Certifications ==
Region	Certification	Certified units/sales
United Kingdom (BPI)	Silver	200,000^{‡}
^{‡} Sales+streaming figures based on certification alone.
