= Popped In Souled Out =

Popped in Souled Out

Studio album by Wet Wet Wet
- Released: 21 September 1987
- Recorded: January 1986 – 1987
- Genre: Soft rock; sophisti-pop; blue-eyed soul
- Label: Mercury Records
- Producer: Wet Wet Wet; Axel Kröll; JWWWL; Michael Baker; Wilf Smarties

Wet Wet Wet chronology
Popped in Souled Out (1987)	The Memphis Sessions (1988)

Singles from Popped in Souled Out
- 1. "Wishing I Was Lucky" Released: 16 March 1987; 2. "Sweet Little Mystery" Released: 13 July 1987; 3. "Angel Eyes" Released: 23 November 1987; 4. "Temptation" Released: 7 March 1988

Professional ratings
Review scores
Source	Rating
AllMusic	3.5/5 stars
Number One	1/5 stars 3/5 stars
Record Mirror	2/5 stars

Popped in Souled Out is the debut studio album by the Scottish band Wet Wet Wet. It was released on 21 September 1987. Its offspring singles were "Wishing I Was Lucky", "Sweet Little Mystery", "Angel Eyes (Home and Away)" and "Temptation". Upon release, it reached number two on the UK Albums Chart, held off top spot by Michael Jackson's Bad. It reached number one on 16 January 1988. A 5-CD 30th Anniversary Edition was released on 22 September 2017.

The vinyl issue of the album only contained the first 9 tracks.

== Track listing ==
All tracks are written by Clark/Cunningham/Mitchell/Pellow, except "Don't Let Me Be Lonely Tonight" by James Taylor & "Angel Eyes (Home and Away)" by Clark/Cunningham/Mitchell/Pellow & Difford.

No.	Title	Length
1.	"Wishing I Was Lucky"	3:52
2.	"East of the River"	3:24
3.	"I Remember"	4:44
4.	"Angel Eyes (Home and Away)"	5:13
5.	"Sweet Little Mystery"	3:43
6.	"I Don't Believe (Sonny's Letter)"	4:39
7.	"Temptation"	4:59
8.	"I Can Give You Everything"	4:05
9.	"The Moment You Left Me"	5:02
10.	"Words of Wisdom"	3:50
11.	"Don't Let Me Be Lonely Tonight"	3:43
12.	"World in Another"	3:05
13.	"Wishing I Was Lucky" (Recorded live on The Wendy May Show – Capital Radio)	3:49

Popped In Souled Out — Japanese edition
No.	Title	Length
14.	"I Remember" (Long version)	7:20
15.	"Home and Away" (Original version)	4:20

Popped In Souled Out — 30th Anniversary edition
No.	Title	Length
14.	"Sweet Little Mystery" (Recorded live on The Wendy May Show – Capital Radio)	3:52
15.	"HTHDTGT" (Recorded live on The Wendy May Show – Capital Radio)	3:13
16.	"Angel Eyes (Home and Away)" (single version)	4:30
17.	"Temptation" (single version)	3:59
18.	"Sweet Little Mystery" (single version)	3:45

== Credits and personnel ==
Vocals by Wet Wet Wet and Graeme Duffin.

- Marti Pellow – Vocals
- Graeme Clark – Bass
- Neil Mitchell – Synthesizers
- Tommy Cunningham – Drums
- Graeme Duffin – Guitar

== Charts ==
=== Weekly charts ===
Chart performance for Popped In Souled Out
Chart (1987–1988)	Peak position
Australian Albums (ARIA)	60
Dutch Albums (Album Top 100)	12
European Albums (Eurotipsheet)	11
German Albums (Offizielle Top 100)	44
New Zealand Albums (RMNZ)	6
Swedish Albums (Sverigetopplistan)	13
UK Albums (OCC)	1
US Billboard 200	123

=== Year-end charts ===
Chart (1987)	Position
UK Albums (OCC)	37

== Certifications ==
Certifications for Popped In Souled Out
Region	Certification	Certified units/sales
Netherlands (NVPI)	Gold	50,000^{^}
New Zealand (RMNZ)	Gold	7,500^{^}
United Kingdom (BPI)	5× Platinum	1,500,000^{^}
^{^} Shipments figures based on certification alone.
