= Sweet Surrender (Wet Wet Wet song) =

1989 single by Wet Wet Wet

Single by Wet Wet Wet

from the album Holding Back the River
- B-side: "This Time" (live); "H.T.H.D.T.G.T."
- Released: 18 September 1989
- Length: 6:01 (album version); 4:24 (single version)
- Label: The Precious Organisation; Mercury
- Songwriters: Marti Pellow; Tommy Cunningham; Graeme Clark; Neil Mitchell
- Producer: Wet Wet Wet

Wet Wet Wet singles chronology
"With a Little Help from My Friends" (1988)	"Sweet Surrender" (1989)	"Broke Away" (1989)

"Sweet Surrender" is the first single from British band Wet Wet Wet's third studio album, Holding Back the River (1989). It was released on 18 September 1989 and reached number six on the UK Singles Chart. In Ireland, "Sweet Surrender" peaked at number one, becoming the group's second of three number-one singles there. In Australia, "Sweet Surrender" reached number seven on the ARIA Singles Chart in May 1990 and was certified gold.

Marti Pellow recorded his own version of the song for inclusion on his 2002 album Marti Pellow Sings the Hits of Wet Wet Wet & Smile. For that version, he changed the lyric from "Hey, little fella, now your show's together" to "Hey, little fella, now your shit's together".

== Music video ==
The music video features the band performing in a dark blue background with a smiling Marti Pellow singing the song and various women dressed in red Arabian clothing swimming in midair.

== Track listings ==
- 7-inch, cassette, and mini-CD single
1. "Sweet Surrender"
2. "This Time" (live at the Govan Town Hall, Glasgow, 15 November 1988)
- 12-inch single

A1. "Sweet Surrender" (extended mix)
B1. "This Time" (live at the Govan Town Hall, Glasgow, 15 November 1988)
B2. "H.T.H.D.T.G.T."

- CD single
1. "Sweet Surrender"
2. "This Time" (live at the Govan Town Hall, Glasgow, 15 November 1988)
3. "H.T.H.D.T.G.T."
4. "Sweet Surrender" (extended version)

== Charts ==
=== Weekly charts ===
Chart (1989–1990)	Peak position
Australia (ARIA)	7
Austria (Ö3 Austria Top 40)	24
Belgium (Ultratop 50 Flanders)	19
Europe (Eurochart Hot 100)	20
Ireland (IRMA)	1
Italy (Musica e dischi)	23
Italy Airplay (Music & Media)	1
Netherlands (Dutch Top 40)	8
Netherlands (Single Top 100)	10
UK Singles (Official Charts)	6
West Germany (GfK)	37

=== Year-end charts ===
Chart (1989)	Position
Netherlands (Dutch Top 40)	71
UK Singles (OCC)	82

Chart (1990)	Position
Australia (ARIA)	63

== Certifications ==
Region	Certification	Certified units/sales
Australia (ARIA)	Gold	35,000^{^}
^{^} Shipments figures based on certification alone.

== Release history ==
Region	Date	Format(s)	Label(s)	Ref.
United Kingdom	18 September 1989	7-inch vinyl; 12-inch vinyl; CD; cassette	The Precious Organisation; Mercury	
United Kingdom	25 September 1989	7-inch vinyl (poster bag)	The Precious Organisation; Mercury	
Japan	21 December 1989	Mini-CD	The Precious Organisation; Mercury	
Australia	19 February 1990	7-inch vinyl; 12-inch vinyl; cassette	The Precious Organisation; Mercury	
