= Wishing I Was Lucky =

1987 single by Wet Wet Wet

Single by Wet Wet Wet

from the album Popped In Souled Out
- B-side: "Words of Wisdom"; "Still Can't Remember Your Name"
- Released: March 1987
- Length: 3:52
- Label: The Precious Organisation; Mercury
- Songwriters: Graeme Clark; Tommy Cunningham; Neil Mitchell; Marti Pellow
- Producers: Wet Wet Wet; Wilf Smarties

Wet Wet Wet singles chronology
"Wishing I Was Lucky" (1987)	"Sweet Little Mystery" (1987)

"Wishing I Was Lucky" is a song by Scottish band Wet Wet Wet, issued as the lead single from their first album, Popped in Souled Out (1987). Recorded for £600 in Edinburgh, it was released as the band's debut single in March 1987 and was their first hit, peaking at No. 6 on the UK Singles Chart and No. 10 in Ireland. The following year, the song reached the top 20 in Belgium and the Netherlands, while in the United States, "Wishing I Was Lucky" became the group's first of two songs to chart on the Billboard Hot 100, peaking at number 58.

Tommy Cunningham later said of the song: "I was in a queue in a chip shop in Glasgow when it came on Radio Clyde. I felt like shouting to everybody, 'That's me and my mates!' It was an incredible feeling I've not forgotten." Marti Pellow recorded an acoustic, solo version of the song for inclusion on his 2002 album, Marti Pellow Sings the Hits of Wet Wet Wet & Smile.

== Music video ==
Two videos were made. The video in the UK features the band watching TV. As they switch channels, each member of the band is sent to the TV on a different channel before being sent back. The video ends with the band (performing the song throughout the video) getting trapped before the TV shuts off abruptly ending the song. The video in the US shows the band performing in a dimly lit room while shots of the band members travel in the city and have fun.

== Track listings ==
7-inch and cassette single

1. "Wishing I Was Lucky"
2. "Words of Wisdom"

UK 12-inch single and European CD single

1. "Wishing I Was Lucky"
2. "Words of Wisdom"
3. "Still Can't Remember Your Name"

UK 2×12-inch single

A1. "Wishing I Was Lucky"
B1. "Words of Wisdom"
B2. "Still Can't Remember Your Name"
C1. "Wishing I Was Lucky" (Metal mix)

US 12-inch single

A1. "Wishing I Was Lucky" (Gotta Job mix) – 6:26
B1. "Wishing I Was Lucky" (instrumental dub) – 4:27
B2. "Wishing I Was Lucky" (live) – 3:50

Australasian 12-inch single

A1. "Wishing I Was Lucky" – 5:42
A2. "Words of Wisdom" – 3:08
B1. "Wishing I Was Lucky" (Metal mix) – 5:44
B2. "Still Can't Remember Your Name" – 4:12

Japanese 12-inch single

A1. "Wishing I Was Lucky"
A2. "Words of Wisdom"
B1. "Wishing I Was Lucky" (long version)
B2. "Still Can't Remember Your Name"

== Charts ==
=== Weekly charts ===
Chart (1987–1988)	Peak position
Belgium (Ultratop 50 Flanders)	16
Europe (European Hot 100 Singles)	37
France (SNEP)	40
Ireland (IRMA)	10
Netherlands (Dutch Top 40)	26
Netherlands (Single Top 100)	19
New Zealand (Recorded Music NZ)	26
UK Singles (Official Charts)	6
US Billboard Hot 100	58
Zimbabwe (ZIMA)	1

=== Year-end charts ===
Chart (1987)	Position
UK Singles (OCC)	87
