= Sweet Little Mystery =

1987 single by Wet Wet Wet

Single by Wet Wet Wet

from the album Popped In Souled Out
- B-side: "Don't Let Me Be Lonely Tonight"; "World in Another"; "Heaven Help Us All"; "May You Never"
- Released: July 1987
- Recorded: 1986
- Genre: Soft rock; pop rock
- Length: 3:45
- Label: The Precious Organisation; Mercury
- Songwriters: Graeme Clark; Van Morrison; John Martyn; Tommy Cunningham; Neil Mitchell; Marti Pellow
- Producers: Willie Mitchell; Michael Baker

Wet Wet Wet singles chronology
"Wishing I Was Lucky" (1987)	"Sweet Little Mystery" (1987)	"Angel Eyes (Home and Away)" (1987)

"Sweet Little Mystery" is a song by Scottish soft rock band Wet Wet Wet. It is the fifth single from the band's debut album Popped In Souled Out (1987), released on Phonogram Inc. Records. The success of the song drove it to number five on the weekly UK Singles Chart the same year as its release. The following year, the song became an international hit, entering the top 20 in Belgium, France, Ireland, the Netherlands and New Zealand. Its peak positioning in numerous weekly charts around the globe marked its contributions to the soft-rock genre which dominated the era.

"Sweet Little Mystery" is Wet Wet Wet's second biggest hit globally, with their cover of the Troggs' "Love Is All Around" being their most known song. The song endured widespread criticism and the group was later sued for copyright infringement by Van Morrison. The group received further criticism for similarities to John Martyn's song of the same name from 1980. Both John Martyn and Van Morrison received co-writers' credits for the song.

Five years after the band's split in 1997, Marti Pellow recorded the song solo in his 2002 album Marti Pellow Sings the Hits of Wet Wet Wet & Smile.

== Recording ==
The song was originally recorded as a soul piece by the band in the mid-1980s, but Phonogram Inc. said it was not "commercial enough for the 80s". The band eventually re-recorded the single in Memphis in 1986, along with the remaining songs from The Memphis Sessions album, and transformed its composition to fit the pop-rock genre.

== Composition ==
"Sweet Little Mystery" is a soft rock, pop song with a medium tempo. It contains bass, drums, guitar, keyboard and voice and was recorded in the key of C major. The vocal range of G4-G5 categorises the song in the range of the alto voice. To fit into the pop-rock genre, the song was re-recorded to have an accumulative beginning, with the riff being gradual and rhythmically active. Spicer (2004) explains this as the "technique of building up a groove". Marti Pellow stated in an interview that changes were made to the song's composition because producers and record labels were "trying to make Wet Wet Wet particularly radio-friendly".

Graeme Clark, bass player of the band, shared the band's experience experimenting with different versions of "Sweet Little Mystery" in an interview with Paul Sinclair. "We did a Stock Aitken Waterman version of 'Sweet Little Mystery' and we never put that on there because it did … we had internal arguments about that, because I thought it should be on there, right, but the argument and the band line was it’s too much like Stock Aitken Waterman with a Marti vocal. And I don’t know if I agree with that…” On the five-disc Popped in Souled Out super deluxe edition, "Sweet Little Mystery" is featured on disc three as a "Mista E remix".

== Music video ==
Mike Brady directed the video for "Sweet Little Mystery", and Phonogram Inc, a subsidiary of PolyGram, produced it. Brady had also directed their single "Angel Eyes". The filming of the video took place in The Gambia in West Africa. The video opens with a young Gambian boy saying "Hello and welcome to Gambia" as the band arrives by plane into the country. The video first depicts Radio Syd broadcasting the band's fresh new single in Gambia. It contains montages, transitioning from their performing at a beach bar to dancing with the local community, displaying the many landscapes of the country.

The video released in 1987, when home video was becoming increasingly popular. Julian Petley states that, in 1979, 230 000 people in the UK owned home video, compared to 13.8 million people in 1989. For the production of the "Sweet Little Mystery" video, Fowler (2017) stated he needed to adopt "the notion of performance in its fullest sense" to fit into the emerging "world of film and pop". This influenced the decision in performing to a local community in Gambia.

== Live performances ==
"Sweet Little Mystery" was first performed on the Wets' Popped In Souled Out tour on 10 October 1987 at the Edinburgh Playhouse. This tour took place throughout the UK. There are performances of "Sweet Little Mystery" featured on the five-disc Popped in Souled Out super deluxe edition. The DVD features the song being performed for the BBC's television program Top of The Pops on 13 August 1987 and 27 August 1987. A live version of the song is also featured on Wet Wet Wet's Spotify as "Sweet Little Mystery – Live at Capital Radio". To celebrate the album's 30th anniversary, the band performed the song on a tour in 2017. Soon after this tour, lead singer Marti Pellow left the band to work on a solo career.

== Controversy ==
In the years following the song's release, the Wets endured widespread criticism, acquiring the reputation of being "the Scottish pop robbers", for using lyrics from Van Morrison's "A Sense of Wonder". Morrison sued the band for copyright infringement and claimed a co-writer's credit on the song. Whilst Morrison sued the band, lead singer Marti Pellow stated they used two lines from "A Sense of Wonder" "to pay homage to him – Van the Man was a big influence on us". The band also shares co-writing credit for "Sweet Little Mystery" with British singer John Martyn, as their choruses share similarities.

== Track listings ==
Standard 7-inch single

A. "Sweet Little Mystery"
B. "Don't Let Me Be Lonely Tonight"

UK 12-inch and cassette single

1. "Sweet Little Mystery"
2. "Don't Let Me Be Lonely Tonight"
3. "World in Another"

UK 12-inch single 2

A1. "Sweet Little Mystery"
A2. "Don't Let Me Be Lonely Tonight"
B1. "Heaven Help Us All"
B2. "May You Never"

European maxi-CD single

1. "Sweet Little Mystery" – 3:43
2. "I Can Give You Everything" – 4:05
3. "Sweet Little Mystery" (The Memphis Sessions) – 3:34
4. "Heaven Help Us All" (The Memphis Sessions) – 3:51

Canadian 7-inch single

A. "Sweet Little Mystery" – 3:43
B. "I Can Give You Everything" – 4:05

US 12-inch single

1. "Sweet Little Mystery" (Mister "E" mix) – 6:08
2. "Sweet Little Mystery" (dub version) – 7:13
3. "Sweet Little Mystery" (7-inch version) – 3:42

== Charts ==
=== Weekly charts ===
Weekly chart performance for "Sweet Little Mystery"
Chart (1987–1989)	Peak position
Australia (Kent Music Report)	33
Belgium (Ultratop 50 Flanders)	15
Europe (European Hot 100 Singles)	38
France (SNEP)	17
Ireland (IRMA)	9
Italy Airplay (Music & Media)	12
Netherlands (Dutch Top 40)	16
Netherlands (Single Top 100)	22
New Zealand (Recorded Music NZ)	3
Switzerland (Schweizer Hitparade)	23
UK Singles (Official Charts)	5
West Germany (GfK)	46

=== Year-end charts ===
1987 year-end chart performance for "Sweet Little Mystery"
Chart (1987)	Position
UK Singles (OCC)	57

1988 year-end chart performance for "Sweet Little Mystery"
Chart (1988)	Position
New Zealand (RIANZ)	38

== Certifications ==
Certifications for "Sweet Little Misery"
Region	Certification	Certified units/sales
United Kingdom (BPI)	Silver	200,000^{‡}
^{‡} Sales+streaming figures based on certification alone.
