= Wet Wet Wet =

Scottish soft rock band

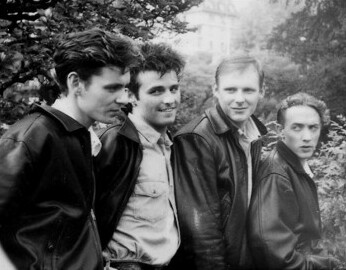
- Wet Wet Wet in Switzerland in 1988

Background information
- Origin: Clydebank, Dunbartonshire, Scotland
- Genres: Soft rock; sophisti-pop; blue-eyed soul
- Years active: 1982–1997, 2004–present
- Labels: Uni, London, Phonogram, The Precious Organisation, Mercury
- Members: Graeme Clark; Graeme Duffin; Kevin Simm
- Past members: Marti Pellow; Tommy Cunningham; Neil Mitchell
- Website: WetWetWet.co.uk

Wet Wet Wet are a Scottish soft rock band formed in 1982 in Clydebank by Marti Pellow (lead vocals), Graeme Clark (bass), Graeme Duffin (guitar) and Tommy Cunningham (drums). The band's debut album, Popped In Souled Out (1987) spawned four successful singles, including "Wishing I Was Lucky" and "Angel Eyes (Home and Away)", with the album peaking atop the albums charts in the United Kingdom, selling 1.5 million copies and earning a 5x Platinum certification from the British Phonographic Industry (BPI).

The lead single from their fourth album, Picture This (1995), "Love Is All Around", topped the singles charts in the United Kingdom, Australia, Denmark, Iceland, Sweden and their native Scotland. Spending a total of fifteen consecutive weeks at number one on the UK Singles Charts, it became one of the longest chart reigns of all time in the United Kingdom, where it sold over 1.9 million copies. The band dissolved in 1997 following the release of their fifth album, 10. The band reformed in 2004 with the original members, and released their fifth album, Timeless in 2007.

The band is currently composed of founding member Graeme Clark (bass, vocals) and lead vocalist Kevin Simm, who replaced founding member Marti Pellow in 2018 after he left during the previous year. Graeme Duffin (lead guitar, vocals) has also been with the band as a touring musician since 1983. The band were named Best British Newcomer at the 1988 Brit Awards.

== History ==
=== Formation and early years: 1982–1987 ===
The quartet formed at Clydebank High School in Clydebank, Scotland, in 1982, under the name Vortex Motion, mostly playing covers of the Clash and Magazine. "It was either crime, the dole, football, or music — and we chose music," said Tommy Cunningham. The original line-up consisted of Neil Mitchell (keyboards), Tommy Cunningham (drums), Graeme Clark (bass), Mark McLachlan (a.k.a. Marti Pellow) (vocals) and Lindsey McCauley (guitar).

"At the time it was Duran Duran, Talk Talk – double-barrelled names; we just added on another to confuse people. And we would look outside and see the rain coming down. It did seem quite relevant to Glasgow."

— Graeme Clark on how the band chose their name, March 1987

Clark and Cunningham met on the school bus and became close friends. Mutual friend Neil Mitchell, prompted by his pals' positive attitude, promised to supply keyboards when he could scrape together enough money from his paper round. To complete the quartet, Clark approached Mark McLachlan, who at the time was training to be a painter and decorator. He said, "At break we all went behind the kitchen for a fly smoke, and there in the corner was this quiet kid who said very little, but when he sang, everyone listened." It was sometime in 1983 that Graeme Duffin joined Wet Wet Wet, after the departure of co-founder Lindsey McCauley. Duffin had previously been in a Glasgow-based band called New Celeste and recorded two albums with them High Sands and the Liquid Lake (1977) in Holland (with sleeve notes by Billy Connolly) on the Universe label and On the Line (1979) in Berlin on the Hansa Records label. The band combined folk, rock and jazz players.

With the line-up complete, rehearsals took place in Mrs. Clark's kitchen. They rehearsed for about two years, working on song producing and writing skills. They eventually made their live debut at Glasgow's Nightmoves venue. At this gig they met Elliot Davis, who would become the band's manager. The band name Wet Wet Wet was chosen from a line in the 1982 Scritti Politti song "Gettin' Havin' & Holdin'" ("it's tired of joking... wet, wet with tears"), and McLachlan changed his name to stage name "Marti Pellow". Their first professional gig was a New Year's Eve show at Glasgow's Barrowlands.

David Bates signed the band to PolyGram in 1985. One of the first demo songs they did was "Wishing I Was Lucky". When the band took the demo to Bates in late 1986, he discarded it as a poor effort. The band decided at this point that they could no longer work with him. Six months later, the band and their new A&R Manager, Nick Angel, released the single, and it reached number six in the UK singles chart. "I was in a queue in a fish and chip shop in Glasgow when it came on Radio Clyde," Cunningham remembers. "I felt like shouting to everybody, 'That's me and my mates!' It was an incredible feeling I've not forgotten." The parent album, Popped In Souled Out, also became a hit and produced three more hit singles, namely "Sweet Little Mystery", "Temptation", and "Angel Eyes". They supported Lionel Richie on his UK tour.

=== Commercial success: 1988–1996 ===
In 1988, Wet Wet Wet scored their first Number 1 hit with a cover version of the Beatles' "With a Little Help from My Friends", recorded for the charity ChildLine. Another Beatles song, "She's Leaving Home", was equally-billed on the flip side, performed by Billy Bragg. In the same year, an album - entitled The Memphis Sessions - was released from their spell in the United States prior to hitting the big time. It was produced and mixed by Willie Mitchell. It was recorded at his Royal Studios in Memphis, Tennessee. The following year the band released their third album, Holding Back the River, which was also a success and produced the hit single "Sweet Surrender". The album was well-received, relying more on strings and other classical arrangements. At the end of 1989, the band appeared on the Band Aid II charity single.

In 1992, the band released a fourth studio album, entitled High on the Happy Side, which spawned the Number 1 hit single "Goodnight Girl" – the only self-penned chart-topping single they have had to date. The song proved something of a saviour, as the previous two single releases from the album had failed in the singles charts, although the album reached the top of the UK Albums Chart. In total, five singles were released from it. The following day saw the release of a special-edition album, Cloak & Dagger, released under the alias "Maggie Pie & The Impostors". "Maggie Pie" was Marti Pellow, and the "impostors" were (on album cover, clockwise from top left) Neil Mitchell, Graeme Duffin, Tommy Cunningham, and Graeme Clark. The band's first greatest-hits package, End of Part One, was released towards the end of 1993. The eighteen-song selection included "Shed a Tear" and "Cold Cold Heart", which were recorded with Nile Rodgers in New York City especially for the album and released as singles.

In 1994, Wet Wet Wet had their biggest hit, a cover version of the Troggs' single "Love Is All Around", which was used on the soundtrack to the film Four Weddings and a Funeral. It was a huge international success and spent 15 weeks atop the British charts. The week before it could have equalled the record for the longest-standing number-one single, held by Bryan Adams' "(Everything I Do) I Do It for You", Pellow insisted on its deletion because he wanted to focus on getting their next album, Picture This, finished. However, even after its deletion, there were still enough copies in the shops to get the song to number 2 in its 16th week, finally knocked off the top spot by Whigfield's debut single "Saturday Night". In any event, it remained in the Top 40 for the remainder of the year. In the official UK best-selling singles list issued in 2002 (the 50th anniversary of the chart), it was placed 12th. "Love Is All Around" also featured on the 1995 album Picture This, their sixth, which also spawned the hit single "Julia Says" and "Don't Want to Forgive Me Now". The album, although well received by critics, would ultimately live in the shadow of "Love Is All Around". In 1995, they became the shirt sponsors of their hometown football club, Clydebank F.C.

=== Subsequent releases and break-up activities: 1997–2003 ===
During the rest of the 1990s the band maintained a strong UK following, although success in the singles charts became more sporadic. Their seventh studio album, 1997's Ten, celebrated the group's decade at the top. After the tour in support of 10, things turned sour over a dispute about royalty-sharing. Revenue from the group's songwriting had been a four-way equal split. Cunningham turned up for a routine band meeting, only to discover that the other three members wanted to revise the policy, paying him a lesser amount. Cunningham instantly resigned from the group saying that the band had run its course and that the band was no longer a healthy place to be. In 1999 Pellow also left the band, to focus on getting himself healthy again after succumbing to a debilitating alcohol and drug addiction. Pellow succeeded in kicking his habits, and returned to the public eye in 2001 with his debut solo album, Smile.

=== Reformation: 2004–2017 ===
In March 2004, the band cautiously reformed in order to work on an eighth album. A single entitled "All I Want" was released in November 2004 from the band's second Greatest Hits, released a week later. They undertook a successful tour of the UK the following month. In July 2005, Wet Wet Wet played at the Summer Weekender festival in England, and were one of the headline acts at Live 8 Edinburgh in Scotland. On 31 December 2006, Wet Wet Wet were the headline act for Aberdeen's Hogmanay celebrations when the celebrations in all other Scottish cities was held off because of strong winds and heavy rain. They performed thirteen songs in an hour-long set. A single, "Too Many People", was released on 5 November 2007, and its parent album, Timeless, on 12 November. These preceded a sold-out December tour, a taste of which was given at their Newmarket concert in August. In preparation for the tour, the band also announced that they will be playing two intimate dates at zavvi stores in Glasgow and London in November. "Weightless", the second single from the album, was released on 4 February and charted at Number 10, giving them their first top-ten hit in eleven years.

In March 2012, it was announced that the band would perform its first concert in over five years, at Glasgow Green on 20 July, to celebrate their 25th anniversary of the release of their debut album, Popped In, Souled Out. In May 2013, UK music promoter Stuart Galbraith of Kilimanjaro Live confirmed a ten date UK tour for Wet Wet Wet commencing in December 2013. On 8 October 2013, Wet Wet Wet announced via their Twitter page that they would be releasing a new Greatest Hits album, Step by Step: The Greatest Hits, on 25 November 2013. The album features three new tracks as well as songs from their back catalogue. On 28 July 2017, it was announced that Pellow had quit Wet Wet Wet to focus on his solo career.

=== New line up and The Journey: 2018–present ===
On 25 September 2018, the band announced that Kevin Simm (formerly of Liberty X) was their new singer. Simm started singing with the band at two shows: St Lukes in Calton, Glasgow, and 229 The Venue in London in November 2018. Following on from their sold-out shows, they announced a nationwide 18-date tour, starting in April 2019.

In November 2020, the band announced the 2021 release of new album The Journey, their first studio album since 2007 and the first including vocals from former The Voice UK winner Kevin Simm, who also re-recorded the vocals on a number of their hits for the bonus CD (which comes with the 2CD/DVD version of album). In May 2022, drummer Tommy Cunningham announced that he quit the band due to his hearing problem, and keyboard player Neil Mitchell also left the band. In May 2023 it was announced the band would unite with Go West for a co-headline UK tour called the "Best of Both Worlds" starting in January 2024.

== Awards and nominations ==
Award	Year	Nominee(s)	Category	Result	Ref.
Brit Awards	1988	Themselves	British Breakthrough Act	Won	
Brit Awards	1989	Themselves	British Group	Nominated	
Brit Awards	1993	"Goodnight Girl"	British Single of the Year	Nominated	
Brit Awards	1995	"Love Is All Around"	British Single of the Year	Nominated	
Ivor Novello Awards	1993	"Goodnight Girl"	The Best Selling Song	Nominated	

== Discography ==
- Popped In Souled Out (1987)
- The Memphis Sessions (1988)
- Holding Back the River (1989)
- High on the Happy Side / Cloak & Dagger (1992)
- Picture This (1995)
- 10 (1997)
- Timeless (2007)
- The Journey (2021)
- Strings Attached (2025)
