= Marti Pellow =

Scottish singer (born 1965)

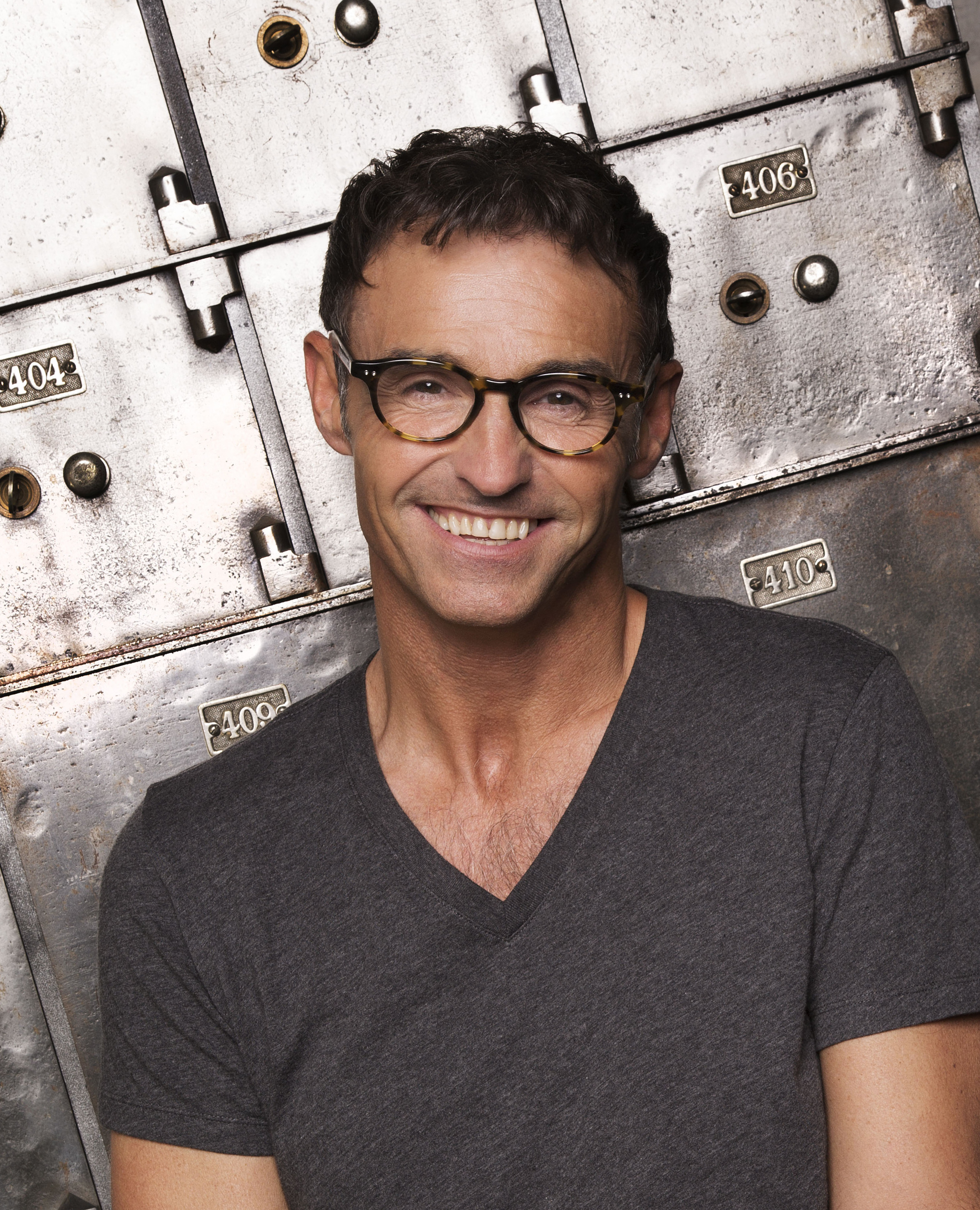
- Pellow in 2014

Background information
- Born: Mark McLachlan; 23 March 1965 (age 61)
- Origin: Clydebank, Dunbartonshire, Scotland
- Genres: Pop; soul; rock
- Occupations: Singer; songwriter; actor
- Years active: 1982–present
- Formerly of: Wet Wet Wet
- Website: martipellowofficial.co.uk

Marti Pellow (born Mark McLachlan; 23 March 1965) is a Scottish singer, best known as the lead singer of the pop group Wet Wet Wet for 28 years: from their formation in 1982 until their split in 1997, and again from their reformation in 2004 to his departure in 2017. The bands debut album, Popped In Souled Out (1987) spawned four successful singles, including "Wishing I Was Lucky" and "Angel Eyes (Home and Away)", with the album peaking in the album charts in the United Kingdom, selling 1.5 million copies and earning a 5x Platinum certification from the British Phonographic Industry (BPI).

The lead single from their fourth album, Picture This (1995), "Love Is All Around" topped the singles charts in the United Kingdom, Australia, Denmark, Iceland, Sweden and their native Scotland. Spending a total of fifteen consecutive weeks at number one on the UK Singles Charts, it became one of the longest chart reigns of all time in the United Kingdom, where it sold over 1.9 million copies. The band dissolved in 1997 following the release of their fifth album, 10, which resulted in Pellow launching a career as a solo artist with his debut solo album Smile being released in June 2001.

Pellow re–joined the band alongside the other members in 2004, releasing their first album of new material in ten years, Timeless in 2007, before Pellow left the band once more in 2017 to focus on his solo career. In addition to music, Pellow has performed as an actor in musical theatre productions in both the West End and on Broadway.

== Early life ==
Pellow's first exposure to music occurred around the age of 7. He would listen to his mother's Barras-bought 8-track record collection of Burt Bacharach and Hal David, but it was the soul genre of the selection that drew him in. Early Marvin Gaye and, especially, Sam Cooke captivated him. He then discovered live music. "Hey, wait a minute – check that picture: not only is this music amazing, but these guys deliver it live? That's for me."

When he told his father about the direction he wanted his life to take, he was less than enthusiastic. "'Are you on a hallucinogenic substance or something? What's wrong with getting out there and getting an apprenticeship? I'm a builder, your grandfather was a builder, your great-grandfather was a shipbuilder. What do you want to be a musician for?' And I said, 'No, you don't understand – this is my vocation in life; this is what I want to be'."

In 1982, at the age of seventeen, McLachlan, who was training to be a painter and decorator, formed a band with three friends from Clydebank High School in his hometown. The friends were Tommy Cunningham, Graeme Clark and Neil Mitchell, and the band's name was Vortex Motion. This was subsequently changed to Wet Wet Wet, a title taken from the Scritti Politti song "Gettin, Havin' and Holdin'". McLachlan also changed his birth name in favour of the stage name Marti Pellow, created from his mother's maiden name Pellow and the nickname he was given at school (“Smarty”).

== Career ==
=== Wet Wet Wet (1987–2017) ===
Pellow enjoyed success with Wet Wet Wet throughout the late 1980s and 1990s. In 1997 drummer Tommy Cunningham left the band over a royalties dispute and its success waned immediately. Pellow was by this time addicted to heroin. On finally overcoming his addiction, he stated: "It was textbook. I couldn't function without it. But there's no romantic side to heroin – it's no good."

Pellow left Wet Wet Wet in May 1999, effectively disbanding the group. They reformed in March 2004. On 28 July 2017, Pellow departed again, to focus on his solo career.

=== Solo launch and Smile (2001–2004) ===
Pellow began his career as a solo artist in association with Chris Difford of Squeeze. The two met while they were patients in The Priory in March 1999. Difford subsequently became Pellow's lyricist and unofficial helper. In November 1999, Pellow began his first solo tour. On 4 June 2001, he released "Close to You" from his debut solo album, Smile. A further single, "I've Been Around the World", was released that November; towards the end of the year he embarked on a seven-date tour (the Smile Tour) around Britain. In 2002, he hosted and sang in Girls' Night Out, one of a week of shows in aid of the Teenage Cancer Trust, at the Royal Albert Hall. This led to him, in 2002, being offered the part of Billy Flynn, the lawyer in the musical Chicago in London's West End and, in 2004, on Broadway. Also in 2002, Pellow released Marti Pellow Sings the Hits of Wet Wet Wet & Smile, an 18-track compilation that included three songs from the latter album.

In November 2003, he issued an album of cover versions, Between the Covers, the single from which was Neil Young's "A Lot of Love".

=== Moonlight Over Memphis and tours (2004–2010) ===
At the end of June 2004, the reformed band went to a secret location to record tracks for a new album and to prepare for a UK tour. At the tour's conclusion, Pellow recorded Moonlight Over Memphis, with the record producer Willie Mitchell, demonstrating a deep affinity with southern soul. The album was released in October 2006 on DMG TV, a label which has had some success previously with albums by such artists as Jane McDonald and Daniel O'Donnell. Pellow went on tour during October and November to support the album, with a helping hand from regular Wets contributor Graeme Duffin.

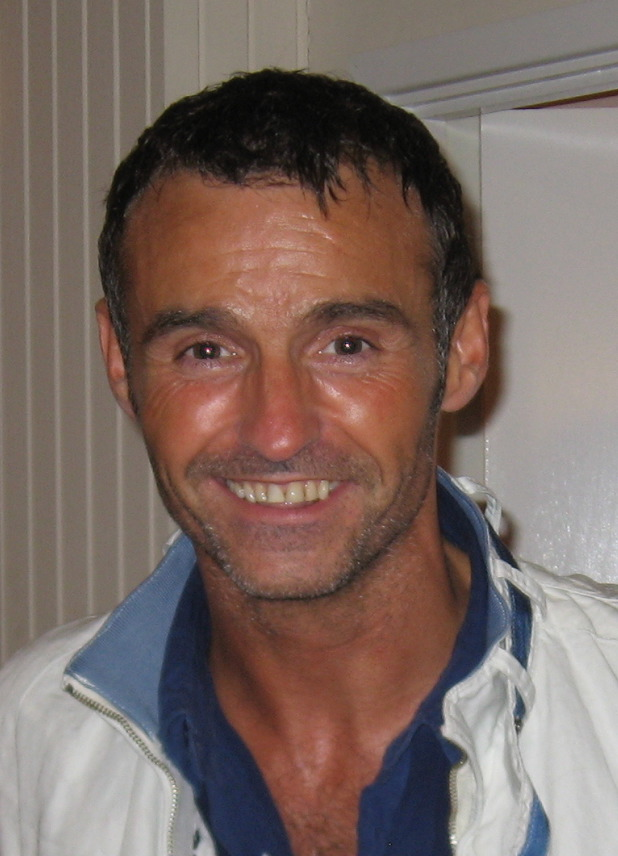
Pellow in 2006

Pellow won the second series of the prime-time BBC1 show Just the Two of Us, which began on 2 January 2007, partnering actress Hannah Waterman. Between February and July 2007, Pellow performed at several jazz clubs and at jazz festivals, including Ronnie Scott's Jazz Club, the Pigalle Club, the Cheltenham Jazz Festival and "Ronnie Scott's in the Park" in Woburn. These gigs were followed in April 2008 by the release of his jazz album, Sentimental Me, on Rhino Records (UK), containing well-known jazz songs and a self-penned song, as well as an accompanying tour throughout the UK.

In May 2008, Pellow appeared in Tim Rice's concert revival of his hit musical Chess, playing the "Arbiter". The concert took place at the Royal Albert Hall on 12 May and 13 May 2008. In June 2009 it aired on British and American television and was released on DVD. From late August 2008 until early May 2009 he was playing the leading role in a revival of the musical The Witches of Eastwick.

=== Devil and the Monkey (2010–2012) ===
In May 2010, Pellow released his fourth studio album, Devil and the Monkey, to coincide with a seven-date arena tour with George Benson, performing songs from his new album as well as hits from his solo and Wet Wet Wet career. In 2011 he released Love To Love album, a fully orchestrated and romantic tribute to his favourite love songs that saw Pellow back in the UK charts, as well as starring in a touring production of Broadway musical Jekyll & Hyde, beginning in January at The Churchill Theatre, Bromley, and ran to the end of July 2011.

On 17 August 2012, Pellow performed his new concert show Boulevard of Life with the RTÉ Concert Orchestra at Dublin's National Concert Hall. The conductor for the show was Fiachra Trench, a previous collaborator. It showcased songs from his 30-year career, both with the band and from his work in musical theatre.

=== Theatre and Stargazer (2012–present) ===
He performed the role of The Sung Thoughts of the Journalist in the 2012–13 arena tour of Jeff Wayne's Musical Version of The War of the Worlds – Alive on Stage! The New Generation. Pellow appeared as Che in Evita on tour around the UK in 2013, and subsequently reprised the role in a limited-run West End production of the musical from 15 September 2014 at the Dominion Theatre. Pellow played the narrator in Willy Russell's Blood Brothers at Hastings White Rock Theatre between 23 and 28 March 2015.

In 2021, he confirmed the release of new single "These Are the Days" and album Stargazer.

== Personal life ==
In October 2003, Pellow's then-ex-bandmates attended his mother's funeral, a show of support that touched the grieving frontman. "I thought it was a powerful gesture", Pellow said. "Moments like that put things into perspective – it wasn't all about music, it was more about a kinship between us. I remember my mother once saying, 'Maybe Wet Wet Wet will get back together again one day'. She must have had a wee vision. I'd never closed the chapter on the band; I'd always left the door open."

== Discography ==
=== Albums ===
Year	Album details	Peak chart positions				Certification
Year	Album details	UK	GER	IRE	NL	Certification
2001	Smile: Released: 4 June 2001; Label: Mercury; Format: CD	7	71	41	44	UK: Gold
2002	Marti Pellow Sings the Hits of Wet Wet Wet & Smile: Released: 18 November 2002; Label: Universal; Format: CD	34	—	—	—	UK: Gold
2003	Between the Covers: Released: 17 November 2003; Label: Universal; Format: CD	66	—	—	—	
2006	Moonlight Over Memphis: Released: 2 October 2006; Label: DMG TV; Format: CD	27	—	—	—	
2008	Sentimental Me: Released: 14 April 2008; Label: Warner Music UK / Rhino; Format: CD	161	—	—	—	
2010	Devil and the Monkey: Released: 23 May 2010; Label: D&M Records; Formats: CD, download, LP	—	—	—	—	
2011	Love to Love: Released: 24 January 2011; Label: Marti Pellow Records; Format: CD	27	—	15	—	
2013	Hope: Released: 18 March 2013; Label: BK Records; Format: CD	60	—	—	—	
2014	Boulevard of Life: Released: 22 September 2014; Label: Marti Pellow Records; Formats: CD, download	—	—	—	—	
2015	Love to Love – Volume 2: Released: 18 December 2015; Label: Marti Pellow Records; Formats: CD, download	—	—	—	—	
2017	Mysterious: Released: 10 March 2017; Label: Arctic Poppy Records; Formats: CD, download	54	—	—	—	
2021	Stargazer: Released: 26 March 2021; Label: BMG; Formats: CD, download	18	—	—	—	
"—" denotes releases that did not chart or were not released.

=== Singles ===
Year	Single	Peak chart positions			Album
Year	Single	UK	IRE	NL	Album
2001	"Close to You"	9	25	66	Smile
2001	"I've Been Around the World"	28	—	—	Smile
2003	"A Lot of Love"	59	—	—	Between the Covers
2006	"Come Back Home"	—	—	—	Moonlight Over Memphis
2006	"It's All About"	—	—	—	Moonlight Over Memphis
2008	"Take a Letter Miss Jones"	—	—	—	Sentimental Me
2010	"Devil and the Monkey"	—	—	—	Devil and the Monkey
2011	"Don't Know Much"	—	—	—	Love to Love
2014	"Goodbye My Sweet Lady"	—	—	—	Boulevard of Life
2017	"Sound of My Breaking Heart"	—	—	—	Mysterious
2017	"Mysterious"	—	—	—	Mysterious
2021	"These Are the Days"	—	—	—	Stargazer
2021	"Stargazer"	—	—	—	Stargazer
"—" denotes releases that did not chart or was not released.
