= Tommy Cunningham =

Scottish musician

- Birth name: Thomas Cunningham
- Born: 22 June 1964 (age 60)
- Genres: Pop
- Occupation(s): Drummer; Songwriter
- Instrument(s): Drums; Vocals
- Years active: 1982 – present

Thomas Cunningham (born 22 June 1964) is a Scottish musician and the drummer for the band Wet Wet Wet.

== Biography ==
Cunningham's father, Tom Sr., bought his son his first drum kit in 1977, "down the Social Club for £15". Shortly thereafter, a chance meeting with Graeme Clark on the school bus brought the two together. Over the next few years the two recruited fellow school friends Mark McLachlan and Neil Mitchell and concentrated on writing their original songs and perfected their song writing craft. From the release of their first single "Wishing I was Lucky", Wet Wet Wet had chart success for a further 10 years.

Cunningham acrimoniously left the band in 1997 after a dispute over royalty payments, and the band went on tour in 1998 without him. At its conclusion, the three remaining members went their separate ways. In 2004, however, they reunited.

In 2010 Cunningham along with Billy Sloan (DJ journalist) put on a benefit show for their friend Tiger Tim Stevens (DJ) who suffered from multiple sclerosis and had been forced to quit his job at Radio Clyde due to his illness; on the same bill were Midge Ure, Jim Diamond, Gerard Kelly, Marti Pellow and Paulo Nutini.

Tommy played drums on Jim Diamond's album "City of Soul" released by Camino Records (catalogue number CAMCD40, release date 3 October 2011). All proceeds from this album of Soul covers benefit the children's charity Radio Clyde Cash For Kids.

Cunningham and the remaining three original members of Wet Wet Wet reformed in 2004.

Cunningham presents an occasional weekend show across the Greatest Hits Radio Scotland.

== Personal life ==
Cunningham is married to his childhood sweetheart Elaine Gallacher. They married in 1991, and have two children: Tayler and Stephen.
