= Graeme Clark (musician) =

Scottish musician, songwriter and record producer

- Born: Graeme Clark; 15 April 1965 (age 61)
- Origin: Glasgow, Scotland
- Genre: Pop
- Occupations: Bassist; Songwriter
- Instruments: Bass guitar Vocals
- Years active: 1982 – Present

Graeme Clark is a Scottish musician, songwriter and record producer. He came to prominence as bass-player, founding member and songwriter from the pop/soul band Wet Wet Wet – the band he formed with friends Neil Mitchell, Tommy Cunningham and Marti Pellow whilst attending Clydebank High School.

The band signed to Polygram Records in 1985 and their debut single Wishing I Was Lucky was a hit along with the album Popped In Souled Out (1987). He performs as a solo artist. He released his debut album ("Mr Understanding"; 2012), and has since released three EPs: ("Solitary Soul", "Catching Fire 2013", "Dry Land 2014"). ‘The Thought Collector’ was released in 2016, and ‘Radio Silence’ in 2018. Clark has toured playing solo acoustic shows around the UK.

== Career ==
Graeme Clark was born in a suburb of Clydebank on 15 April 1965. He got his first electric guitar at the age of 10 but admits his first and abiding interest was in bass-playing.

Clark was a founder member of Wet Wet Wet.

As well as Wet Wet Wet, Clark has worked with Chic and collaborated with Nile Rodgers. He started writing solo music for a film, Shoreditch (Malcolm Needs, 2002) starring, among others, Shane Richie.

Under his own name, Clark penned two songs for a Bollywood movie soundtrack – American Daylight (Roger Christian, 2004). During 2004, he collaborated with James Fox although none of the work was released. In 2010, Clark began working on new songs for his own use and in July 2011, Clark released his first solo EP, "Solitary Soul", recorded both at his home studio, and at the Foundry Music Lab outside Glasgow. At this time Graeme also played his first solo show in Oran Mor, Glasgow along with shows at a number of UK cities later in the year. Graeme's first album, Mr Understanding, was released in February 2012 and another tour followed in April.

In 2012, Clark said that he had struggled with drug and alcohol addictions. After seeking treatment he began performing on his own, including in the Wilfred Owen musical, Bullets and Daffodils at the Jermyn Street Theatre.

On 23 March 2018, Clark returned to his hometown of Clydebank to play at Clydebank Town Hall in aid of Teenage Cancer Trust. There he was presented with a Lifetime Recognition Award from West Dunbartonshire Councils Provost.
