= British women's literature of World War I =

For much of the twentieth century, a deep ignorance was displayed towards British women's literature of World War I. Scholars reasoned that women had not fought combatively, thus, did not play as significant a role as men. Accordingly, only one body of work, Vera Brittain’s autobiographical, Testament of Youth, was added to the canon of Great War literature. Conversely, anthologies published mid-century such as Brian Gardner's, Up the Line to Death: The War Poets of 1914-1918, contained no mention of contributions made by women. Similarly, Jon Silkin’s 1979 anthology, Penguin Book of First World War Poetry, included the work of only two women, Anna Akhmatova and Marina Tsvetaeva. However, new research has changed ideological beliefs about the role women assumed in producing authentic accounts of war. More specifically, in Britain, research attends to an explanation of how women's war literature shaped feminist discourse during and immediately following the war.

Catherine Reilly has closely studied women's literature from World War I and its resulting impact on the relationship between gender, class, and society. Reilly's 1981 anthology, Scars Upon my Heart: Women’s Poetry and Verse of the First World War, is the first work strictly dedicated to examining women's poetry and prose from World War I. In it, she demonstrates the existence of a strong female narrative. She argues that women's writing was overshadowed by the false belief that male writing was of greater importance. Scholar Vincent Sherry agrees, noting that women had a strong and powerful literary voice, that until recently had been ignored.

== Women on the Home Front ==
According to Millicent Fawcett, founder of Newnham College, Cambridge and president of the National Union of Women's Suffrage Societies, women transitioned from domestic serfdom to social freedom by the end of World War I. This is due to the fact that women moved from domestic life into the industrial realm of society. During the war, industrial factories often transitioned into munitions factories. The women that worked in this field were referred to as munitionettes. There was an increase of opportunities in the job market, as two million women replaced men in the workplace. Women became active in the roles that were previously occupied by men. Furthermore, 37% of women were employed by the end of the war. British women were brought out of the household and traditional domestic life and thrust into industrial factory work.

Women also began working in hospitals. More specifically, the Scottish Women's Hospital was founded in 1914 and began working in relation with the Royal Army Medical Corps. By the end of the war, women were partaking in tasks throughout war ravaged Europe, including Serbia, Russia, and Germany.

Although women began working in the same sector as men, there remained a significant difference in rights. Unable to unionize as uniformly as men during this period, women faced struggles to acquire similar work hours and wages. Even throughout the post-war years, women's unions did not increase wages.

The emergence of the term ‘home front’ carried a gendered aspect that defined the theatre of war as masculine and the home as feminine. While problematic, this gendered identification worked to support the traditional male and female paradigm in Britain. Scholar Susan Kingsley Kent argues that, “women at the front represented the war with a tone and imagery "markedly dissimilar" from those at home." This was reflected in women's writing.

== Spaces of Women's Writing ==
During the War, women were being published in anthologies, newspapers, periodicals, factory newspapers, and women's magazines. Therefore, women's writing from this time was more extensive than was previously thought. Claire Buck asserts that more than 2000 poets were published during the war. However, only one-fifth of all published work was written by active service members. Alternatively, Nosheen Khan estimates that over one quarter, or 500 women wrote on war at this time. This is a significant development because British women actively documented the war experience from home and on the battlefield. These works chronicled firsthand accounts of interaction with wounded soldiers, life in the trenches, and the difficulties of maintaining moral support from mainland Britain. They are important documents as they provide a new perspective on issues concerning Britain's role. Thus, poetry and prose produced by women between 1914 and 1918 contributed to a richer and more accurate textual experience of the war effort.

A great fear arose amongst women who believed their writing would fall into obscurity. In 1949, Brittain noted that she was anxious that most female literature would not survive because it was overshadowed by the male experience of war (Smith, 105). This theory was proven correct, as interest in Women's writing did not gain prominence until the early 1980s when, as part of the larger feminist conversation, critics began examining the politics of gender and war.

== Social Climate of Women's Writing ==
World War I challenged Britain's entrenched societal hierarchy. The First World War required the British populous to reassess their historical precedence in international involvement and domestic issues concerning class and gender. By the start of the First World War, the role of women in Britain changed rapidly. While men were shipped to the frontlines, women remained on the home front, ensuring that Britain and its vast Empire continued to operate.

The outbreak of World War I brought substantial unemployment. Some of the worst hit industries were those that traditionally employed women during peacetime. For instance, fabrication and associated industries such as, “traditional ‘women’s trades’- cotton, linen, silk, lace, tailoring, dressmaking, millinery, hat-making, pottery, and fish-gutting” saw drastic employment decline. As the war dragged on and conscription was instituted women entered the workforce in significant numbers.

== Fiction ==
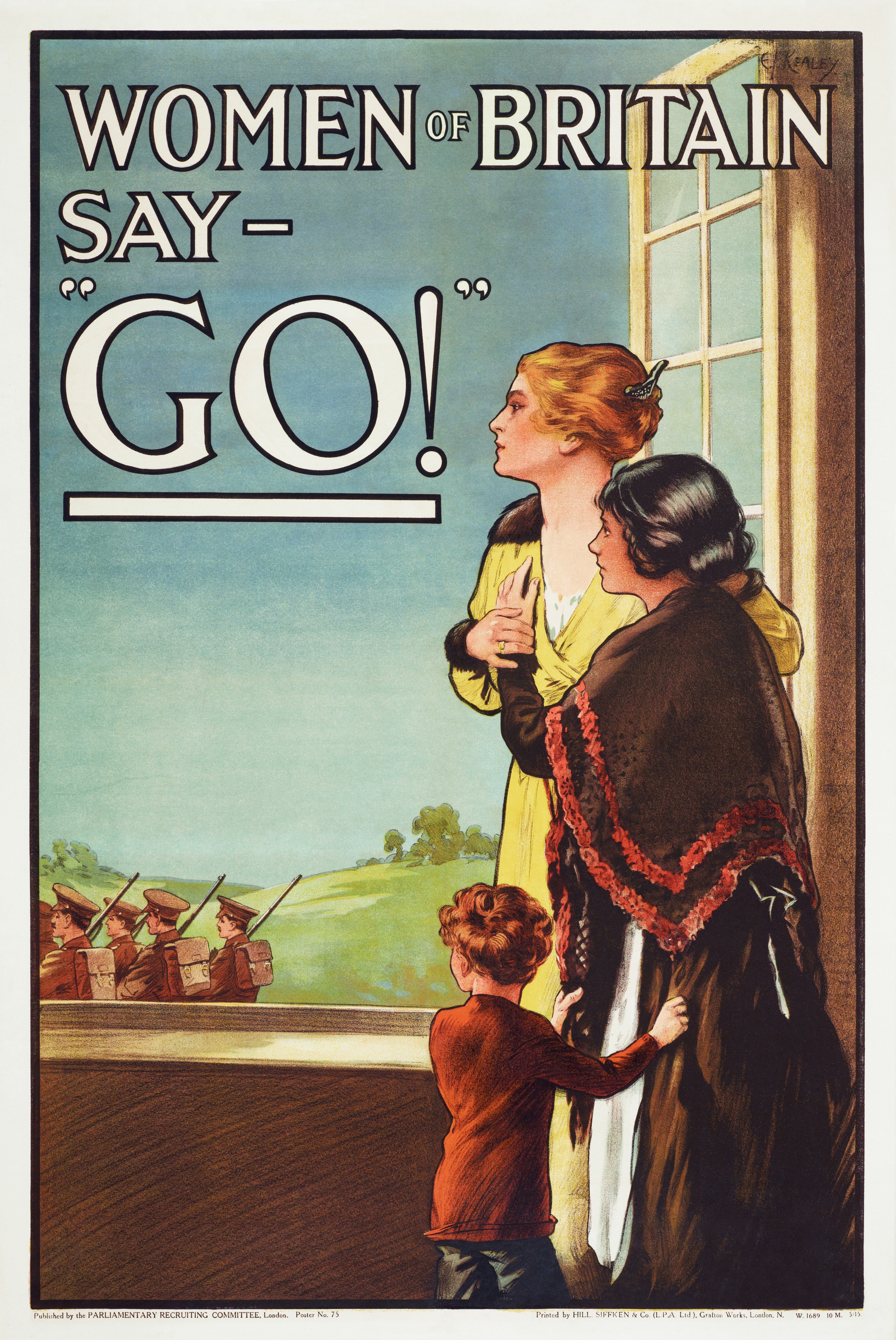
Women of Britain Say - "Go!" - May 1915 poster by the Parliamentary Recruiting Committee

The British government strongly advocated the use of women's literature for propagandist means. Images and prose combined to sway popular opinion before conscription became mandatory. These ideas manifested gendered beliefs that would often inspire or shame men into joining the war effort. Posters would often be used with captions to the effect of, "Women of Britain say: Go!". Likewise, women's poetry asserted the patriotism and fortitude of women in wartime. Women's writing used traditional symbols of male heroism to reinforce the power of women writers' poetic voices in contrast to the perceived cowardice of men who failed to enlist. In contrast, posters and literature were aimed at women with the intention of reinforcing positive attitudes. For example, writing and images featured depictions of cheerful munitions workers and homemakers in aprons whose kitchens provided the "key" to victory.

=== Women's Prose ===
Feminist historians have claimed that women's writing from the front gave access to a more authentic representation of the war. Literary historian David Trotter asserts that the addition of women's writing helps provide a more encompassing, and thus, stronger picture of Britain's involvement in the First World War. The women who served in non-combative roles such as ambulance drivers, nurses, and munitions workers all provided a unique perspective of life during this time. As a result, women's wartime writing reflected many of the overarching themes of early twentieth century feminist discourse. Women who wrote about war shared themes of patience, loss, and grief, and their experiences at the front. The result was a sense of liberation and freedom that had not previously been explored within British female authorship.

==== Rebecca West ====
Authors such as Rebecca West used her work to produce literature that supported revolution. For instance, her 1916 novel, The Return of the Soldier, examined the psychoanalytical conditions of war and the resulting impact on returning soldiers. Furthermore, it provided a strong commentary on feminist discourse that allowed women to reimagine Britain as a space where they could gain cultural capital and privilege.

== Poetry ==
According to Paul Fussell, many soldiers relied on poetry as a method to cope with the atrocities and horrors of the First World War. British male poetry often promoted the idea that women stayed at home to support the war with ‘undying love.' Poetry was not strictly composed by men on the battlefield, but it was also written by women in different areas of conflict. This includes women at home in the factories, at the front lines, or in military hospitals. The poems written by women were often taken from person experiences including romance, heroism, outrage, or suffering. In addition to these central themes, many female writers of this era believe that women's writing will be overshadowed by the stories of war told my men. John Buchan and J.G. Wilson believed that the First World War was the greatest period in England for poetry. This can be attested to the fact that over five-hundred women wrote poetry about the Great War during its time.

There are numerous female poets that remain popular today. Dissimilar to the idea that their writings would be overshadowed by war stories told by men, these poets have many publications. Vera Brittain has written poems and stories about the Great War. Not only was Brittain a writer, she was a nurse in the Voluntary Aid Detachment. This shows the support women had for the war and the importance they played in a non-combative manner. In addition, Lady Margaret Sackville refers to the women during the Great War as life-savers. More specifically, Sackville believes that women are supporting a war that is unnecessary in her poem The Pageant of War. Rupert Brooke attributed women with more credit than had previously been given in his poem There’s Wisdom in Women which he published in 1914 & Other Poems.

The bombing of England during World War I by the zeppelin raids provided citizens at home to see first-hand the devastation of war. Rose MaCaulay explains this in her poem The Shadow. There was an attempt to show the relationship between the sufferings of soldiers on the battlefield with the suffering of British citizens at home. The Shadow was not MaCaulay's only poem on the Great War. Many Sisters to Many Brothers expresses her distaste to the fact that the societal norm was to determine that women were more disabled than men in the war effort. More specifically, there was an idea that the war was specifically fought and won by soldiers on the battlefield. Women played an important role in supporting the war, both at home and abroad. Vera Brittain's poem The Sisters Buries at Lemnos is a poem about the heroics displayed by women during the war. The role that women played in supporting the war must be remembered because many women were killed during the conflict. Brittain's poem expresses disappointment that there is no memorial to remember the women that fell alongside the soldiers.

The following is a list of a few popular female British poets writing about or during the Great War:

- Vera Brittain
- May Wedderburn Cannan
- Margaret Postgate Cole
- Rose Macaulay
- Alice Meynell
- Jessie Pope
- Margaret Sackville

=== Poetry and gender roles ===
Poetry provided female writers an opportunity to express their views through metaphor and allusion. Consequently, wartime writing allowed women to challenge prevailing societal beliefs by arguing in favour of extended social and political rights such as enfranchisement. Women writers reimagined Britain's post-war social landscape by using their writing as a way to evoke sharp criticism of masculine British hegemony.

Even while confined to the trenches, men held to intrinsic beliefs about gender. For instance, correspondence between men in the trenches and women at home provided insight into the way men viewed the role of women. Men saw home as reflecting the prescribed gender roles, where women were responsible for nurturing and caring for the man. In return, men received letters that remind them of the domesticity at home.

Poetry was a literary outlet that had traditionally been more accessible to British women. For instance, “women were a substantial part of the poetic tradition in wartime Britain, as writers and readers, and their wartime works offer an opportunity to examine how women writers positioned their sex as central to the War effort." Poems allowed women to express feminist discourse concerning ideas of nationalism and sacrifice, and provided a space in which they could inform their desire to contribute more prominently in post-war Britain. Even women who opposed the war on moral and philosophical grounds argued that they played an important role in the British war effort.

== Uses of WWI Female Literature ==
World War I challenged Britain's entrenched societal hierarchy. The First World War required the British populous to reassess their historical precedence in international involvement and domestic issues concerning class and gender. By the start of the First World War, the role of women in Britain changed rapidly. While men were shipped to the frontlines, women remained on the home front, ensuring that Britain and its vast Empire continued to operate.

The outbreak of World War I brought substantial unemployment. Some of the worst hit industries were those that traditionally employed women during peacetime. For instance, fabrication and associated industries such as, “traditional ‘women’s trades’- cotton, linen, silk, lace, tailoring, dressmaking, millinery, hat-making, pottery, and fish-gutting” saw drastic employment decline. As the war dragged on and conscription was instituted women entered the workforce in significant numbers.

The emergence of the term ‘home front’ carried a gendered aspect that defined the theatre of war as masculine and the home as feminine. While problematic, this gendered identification worked to support the traditional male and female paradigm in Britain. Scholar Susan Kingsley Kent argues that, “women-at the front represented the war with a tone and imagery "markedly dissimilar" from those at home." This was reflected in women's writing.

== See also ==
- British Literature
- Great Britain
- Rebecca West
- World War I
- World War I in literature
- Vera Brittain
