= Scars Upon My Heart =

1981 anthology of WWI poems edited by Catherine W. Reilly

- Editor: Catherine W. Reilly
- Language: English
- Subject: Poetry of World War I
- Genre: Poetry anthology
- Publisher: Virago Press
- Publication date: 1981
- Publication place: England
- ISBN: 9780860682264

Scars Upon My Heart is an anthology of poetry written by American and British women during the First World War, compiled and edited by Catherine W. Reilly and published by Virago Press in 1981. Scars Upon My Heart is recognized as a pioneering presentation of women's literary expression during the First World War, giving voice to women's experiences, thoughts, and emotions. In the words of Jennifer Kilgore-Caradec, the book 'largely contributed to the current reevaluation of poetry written by women during World War I'.

== Publication ==
Catherine Reilly (4 April 1925 – 26 September 2005) was Assistant Borough Librarian in Trafford, England from 1974–1980 when she began compiling a bibliography of war poetry. The result of her efforts was the 402 page work English Poetry of the First World War: A Bibliography (1978). Her sources included English–language works such as privately published poetry volumes, fundraising books, magazines, newspapers, and anthologies published during the war years.

Of the 2,225 poets she recorded for the bibliography English Poetry of the First World War, 532 were women, the majority of whom served the war efforts in some capacity, with the Voluntary Aid Detachment, Red Cross, or in the volunteer police Special Constabulary. In the introduction to Scars Upon My Heart, she writes that the bibliography motivated her to create the anthology; she was curious 'as to why the work of most of the 532 women poets traced in my bibliographical study should have apparently faded into oblivion'.

The book's publisher Virago Press was dedicated to recovering women’s writing. The aims of the press were well-suited for Scars Upon My Heart Stacy Gillis argues: 'The numerous poetry anthologies published both during the war and through to the late 1970s were unanimous in their sustained championing of a fairly small group of male poets, a brotherhood of "Those who were there" on the Western Front'. In the 1970s and 1980s, feminist literary critics sought out women writers from earlier eras and were instrumental in raising questions about 'traditions of poetic value' that restricted what works would be studied. Anthologies were important in disseminating the literature of earlier women poets and Scars Upon My Heart is notable for being among several works that demonstrated the 'polyphony of women’s wartime voices ranging from the pacifist, through those filled with sadness, remorse, and guilt, to the purely militaristic'.

The book sold over 40,000 copies by the time of Reilly's death in 2005 and has been continuously in print since its release, with a new edition published in 2006. The anthology also was reissued in an omnibus edition combined with Reilly's later collection Chaos of the Night: Women's Poetry and Verse of the Second World War (1984) as The Virago Book of Women's War Poetry and Verse (1997).

In the book The Great War and Women's Consciousness, Claire Tylee stresses the timeliness of the anthology, positioning Scars Upon My Heart amidst a groundswell of interest in 'the female dimension of the memory of the Great War' that included the 1978 paperback publication of Vera Brittain's Testament of Youth and the subsequent 1979 BBC television dramatisation of Brittain's memoir.

== Contents ==
Scars Upon My Heart includes 125 poems written by 79 women, bringing together works by writers with established reputations, such as Edith Sitwell, May Wedderburn Cannan, Margaret Postgate Cole, Sara Teasdale, and Katharine Tynan. However, the volume also reintroduced to modern readers writers whose poetry was topical and occasional, such as Jessie Pope, Eva Dobell, and Pauline B. Barrington. The poems range from elegy and sonnet forms through jingoistic propaganda.

The title of the anthology is taken from the 1918 poem 'To My Brother' by Vera Brittain, one of three poems by Brittain reproduced in the anthology. The first line of the poem reads, 'Your battle-wounds are scars upon my heart'.

The collection organises poems alphabetically by author last name. It opens with a preface by British poet Judith Kazantzis, an introduction by Catherine Reilly, and bibliographical acknowledgements. Brief biographies of the authors ('incomplete' and 'supplied where possible') follow the contents. The book concludes with an index to the first lines of the poems.

=== Poets in the anthology Scars Upon My Heart ===
- Marian Allen
- Lilian M. Anderson
- Pauline B. Barrington
- Madeline Ida Bedford
- Maud Anna Bell
- Nora Bomford
- Sybil Bristowe
- Vera Brittain
- May Wedderburn Cannan
- Isabel C. Clarke
- Margaret Postgate Cole
- Mary Gabrielle Collins
- Alice Corbin (Henderson)
- Nancy Cunard
- Elizabeth Daryush
- Helen Dircks
- Eva Dobell
- Helen Parry Eden
- Gabrielle Elliot
- Eleanor Farjeon
- S. Gertrude Ford
- Elizabeth Chandler Forman
- Lilian Gard
- Muriel Elsie Graham
- Nora Griffiths
- Diana Gurney
- Cicely Hamilton
- Helen Hamilton
- Ada M. Harrison
- Mary H. J. Henderson
- Agnes Grozier Herbertson
- May Herschel-Clarke
- Teresa Hooley
- Elinor Jenkins
- Anna Gordon Keown
- Margery Lawrence
- Winifred M. Letts
- Olive E. Lindsay
- Amy Lowell
- Rose Macaulay
- Nina Macdonald
- Florence Ripley Mastin
- Charlotte Mew
- Alice Meynell
- Ruth Comfort Mitchell
- Harriet Monroe
- Edith Nesbit
- Eileen Newton
- Eleanour Norton
- Carola Oman
- May O'Rourke
- Emily Orr
- Jessie Pope
- Inez Quilter
- Dorothy Una Ratcliffe
- Ursula Roberts
- Margaret Sackville
- Aimee Byng Scott
- May Sinclair
- Edith Sitwell
- C. Fox Smith
- Marie Carmichael Stopes
- Muriel Stuart
- Millicent Sutherland
- C.A.L.T.
- Sara Teasdale
- Lesbia Thanet
- Aelfrida Tillyard
- Iris Tree
- Alys Fane Trotter
- Katharine Tynan
- Viviane Verne
- Alberta Vickridge
- Mary Webb
- M. Winifred Wedgwood
- Catherine Durning Whetham
- Lucy Whitmell
- Margaret Adelaide Wilson
- Marjorie Wilson

== Reception ==
=== Reviews ===
A number of early reviews were critical of the anthology. In a negative review in The Observer, Lorna Sage reviled 'the amateurishness of many of the writers': 'There are, too, many "poems" in the proper sense—about personal loss, about England as a garden (described again and again, with pitiful irony) where everything grows but love'. The poet Janet Montefiore also called the poems 'amateurish', writing in 1987, '[h]owever grateful we are to the editor for disinterring these poems ... it cannot be pretended that many of them are good, most being uncomfortably reminiscent of the "original contributions" sections of an old-fashioned school magazine'.

However, over a decade later, Montefiore reconsidered her opinion of the value of Scars Upon My Heart, calling the anthology a 'complex and (partly) oppositional tradition of women's war poetry' that included 'thoughtful poems by women deeply aware of the contradictions of their own passive but mentally active role'. She notes that 'trashing the experiences of anxiety and bereavement–which women's war poems are full of–as somehow less authentic, less historical, than having your legs blown off' relies on the value of trench experience as essential to true war poetry. Montefiore echoes a common point raised among feminist literary critics, that 'the definition of war poetry privileges actual battlefront experience'. 'But why should women poets write of the trenches?' Joan Montgomery Byles asked in a 1985 review of Scars Upon My Heart: 'There is enough other female experience of the war in this anthology, Scars, to give a representative voice to what women felt and thought during this great catastrophe, both behind the lines in France and on the Home Front'. Byles praised the anthology as 'a moving record of women's consciousness at a crucial time in history'. Byles later devoted the second chapter of her book War, Women, and Poetry to an assessment of the anthology, concluding that:

Scars is still the most useful single comprehensive source and poetic narrative for understanding the response of women in Britain to the impact of World War I. Although the poems vary in skill and form, they convey a moving and sometimes eloquent account of women's lives as mothers, wives, sisters, lovers, munition workers, nurses, ambulance drivers, and pacifist and militant suffragists. The war influenced every aspect of women's lives; and the themes of guilt, despair, protest, grief, lament, and reconciliation to a bitter and sometimes even shameful survival constitute the narrative of the anthology as a whole.

Following the initial reception of the book in literary and critical circles, assessment of the anthology remained divided between addressing the literary merit of some of the poems and acknowledging the value of the collection to literary history. Jane Dowson defends the poetry, commenting, 'Since women's experiences were more obviously "at home" ... their writing has been prejudged as irrelevant in the terms of canonical trench poetry or the modernist opposition to domestic culture'. Gill Plain praises Reilly for resisting 'the temptation to pass judgement on the poets'. In a review essay of British women's literature of World War I that cites Scars Upon My Heart, Claire Buck observes that 'aesthetic value may not be a useful framework for understanding women's war poetry'.

Advertisement for a production of Scars Upon My Heart, directed by Anne Harvey. Ruislip and Northwood Gazette (England), 7 November 1990.

=== Adaptations ===
Shortly after the publication of Scars Upon My Heart, Anne Harvey devised a series of staged presentations of the poems featuring actresses such as Annette Crosbie, Estelle Kohler, Eileen Atkins, Charlotte Harvey, and Maureen O'Brien. These staged readings were presented at London's Southbank Center in 1983 and the Stratford-upon-Avon Poetry Festival in 1984. By 1986, Harvey turned the readings into a full dramatised program featuring period costume, a stage set with poppies, and a pianist. The performances continued into the 1990s.

== See also ==
- British women's literature of World War I

== Sources ==
- Brittain, Vera (1981). "To My Brother". Scars Upon My Heart. London: Virago. p. 15.
- Byles, Joan Montgomery (1995). War, Women, and Poetry, 1914-1945: British and German Writers and Activists. Newark, DE: University of Delaware Press. pp. 44, 62.
- Brittain, Vera. 'To My Brother'. In Scars Upon My Heart, edited by Catherine Reilly, 15. London: Virago, 1981. The full poem may be accessed at Poets.org.
- Byles, Joan Montgomery. War, Women, and Poetry, 1914–1945: British and German Writers and Activists. Newark, DE: University of Delaware Press, 1995.
- Byles, Joan Montgomery. "Women's Experience of World War One: Suffragists, Pacifists and Poets." Women's Studies International Forum 8, no. 5 (1985): 473-487.
- Buck, Claire. 'British Women's Writing of the Great War'. In The Cambridge Companion to the Literature of the First World War, edited by Vincent Sherry, 85-112. Cambridge: Cambridge University Press, 2005.
- Clarke, Jennifer. 'War'. In Encyclopedia of Feminist Literary Theory, edited by Elizabeth Kowaleski Wallace, 421-423. London: Taylor & Francis, 2009.
- Dowson, Jane. Women, Modernism and British Poetry, 1910–1939: Resisting Femininity. New York: Routledge, 2017.
- ‘First World War Poems Showcase’. Poetry by Heart (Bristol, England).
- Gillis, Stacy. '"Many Sisters to Many Brothers": The Women Poets of the First World War'. In The Oxford Handbook of British and Irish War Poetry, edited by Tim Kendall, 100-113. Oxford: Oxford University Press, 2009.
- Gray, Janet. 'Feminist Poetics'. In Encyclopedia of Feminist Literary Theory, edited by Elizabeth Kowaleski Wallace, 157–159. London: Taylor & Francis, 2009.
- Harvey, Anne. 'Obituary: Catherine Reilly'. Independent (London), 10 October 2005, .
- Higonnet, Margaret. Behind the Lines: Gender and the Two World Wars. New Haven: Yale University Press, 1987.
- Kilgore-Caradec, Jennifer. 'Women Writing World War I in Poetry: The Long Angle Toward Peace'. Arts of War and Peace 3, no. 2 (10 July 2022).
- Montefiore, Janet. Arguments of Heart and Mind: Selected Essays 1977-2000. Manchester, UK: Manchester University Press, 2002.
- Montefiore, Janet. Feminism and Poetry: Language, Experience, Identity in Women's Writing. London: Pandora, 1987.
- 'Mum and Daughter Team Up for Peace'. Acton Gazette, 7 November 1986: 19.
- Plain, Gill. '"Great Expectations": Rehabilitating the Recalcitrant War Poets'. Feminist Review, no. 51 (Autumn 1995): 41-65.
- 'Production News'. The Stage, 27 October 1983: 16.
- 'Professor Anne Varty, Scars Upon My Heart'. Royal Holloway, University of London. 5 July 2018, .
- Reilly, Catherine W., ed. Scars Upon My Heart. London: Virago, 1981.
- Sage, Lorna. 'Blighty in a Nighty'. The Observer (London), 15 November 1981.
- Scars Upon My Heart. Advertisement. Ruislip and Northwood Gazette, 7 November 1990.
- Tylee, Claire. The Great War and Women's Consciousness: Images of Militarism and Womanhood in Women's Writings, 1914-1964. New York: Macmillan, 1990.
- 'War on Women'. Stratford-upon-Avon Herald, 10 August 1984: 3.
