= World War I in literature =

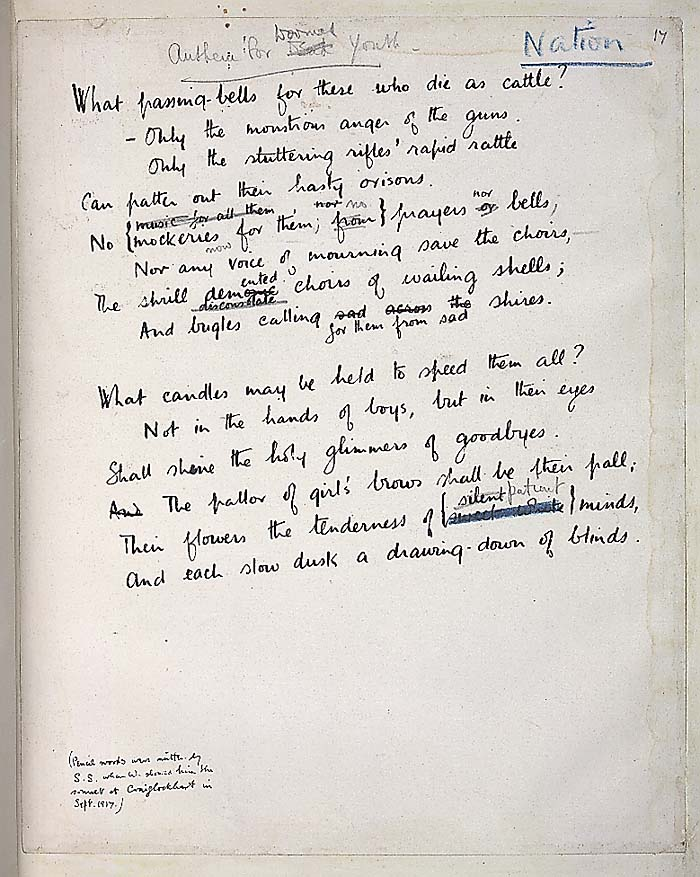
A scan of a final draft of Anthem for Doomed Youth by Wilfred Owen, penned by the author.

Literature about World War I is generally thought to include poems, novels and drama; diaries, letters, and memoirs are often included in this category as well. Although the canon continues to be challenged, the texts most frequently taught in schools and universities are lyrics by Siegfried Sassoon and Wilfred Owen; poems by Ivor Gurney, Edward Thomas, Charles Sorley, David Jones and Isaac Rosenberg are also widely anthologised. Anglophone writers, often connected to the British or US military participation in the war, and German, French and Italian all produced significant volume of works as well.

Many of the works during and about the war were written by men because of the war's intense demand on the young men of that generation; however, a number of women (especially in the British tradition) created literature about the war, often observing the effects of the war on soldiers, domestic spaces, and the home front more generally. Both fiction works like All Quiet on the Western Front and A Farewell to Arms and memoirs by authors like Ernst Jünger and Robert Graves significantly changed public perception of the war. In the post war years and middle of the 20th century, notable works about the war were also adapted into important films.

World War I continues to be a theme of historical fiction late into the 20th century, including works that received significant awards like Pat Barker's Regeneration Trilogy and War Horse (1982) by Michael Morpurgo. During the late 20th century and early 21st century a significant amount adaptations continued to depict the war, often based on more contemporary fiction.

== General ==
The spread of education in Britain in the decades leading up to World War I meant that British soldiers and the British public of all classes were literate. Professional and amateur authors were prolific during and after the war and found a market for their works.

Literature was produced throughout the war - with women, as well as men, feeling the 'need to record their experiences' - but it was in the late 1920s and early 1930s that Britain had a boom in publication of war literature. The next boom period was in the 1960s, when there was renewed interest in World War I during the fiftieth anniversaries and after two decades focused on World War II.

== Poetry ==
Published poets wrote over two thousand poems about and during the war. However, only a small fraction still is known today, and several poets that were popular with contemporary readers are now obscure. An orthodox selection of poets and poems emerged during the 1960s, which often remains the standard in modern collections and distorts the impression of World War I poetry. This selection tends to emphasise the horror of war, suffering, tragedy and anger against those that wage war.

In the early weeks of the war, British poets responded with an outpouring of literary production. Rudyard Kipling's For all we have and are was syndicated extensively by newspapers in English speaking countries. Robert Bridges contributed a poem Wake Up, England! at the outbreak of war that he later wished suppressed., John Masefield, who later succeeded Bridges as poet laureate, wrote August, 1914, a poem that was admired widely.

Wilfred Owen was killed in battle; but his poems created at the front did achieve popular attention after the war's end, e.g., Dulce Et Decorum Est, Insensibility, Anthem for Doomed Youth, Futility and Strange Meeting. In preparing for the publication of his collected poems, Owen tried to explain:

This book is not about heroes. English poetry is not yet fit to speak of them. Nor is it about deeds, or lands, nor anything about glory, honour, might, majesty, dominion, or power, except War. Above all I am not concerned with Poetry. My subject is War, and the pity of War. The Poetry is in the pity. This brief statement became the basis for a play based on the friendship between Owen and Siegfried Sassoon in 1917.

Epic poem In Parenthesis by David Jones (artist-poet) has also been widely hailed as a masterpiece.

The poem In Flanders Fields by John McCrae continues to be one of the more popular wartime poems in Canada, and has achieved a status where it is recognised as one of the country's most notable unofficial symbols.

The expressionist poet August Stramm wrote some of Germany's important poems about the war.

From the war itself until the late 1970s, the genre of war poetry was almost exclusively reserved for male poets. This was based on an idea of an exclusive authenticity limited to the works of those who had fought and died in the war. It excluded other forms of experience in the war, such as mourning, nursing and the home front, which were more likely to be experienced by other demographics such as women. There were over 500 women writing and publishing poetry during World War I. Examples of poems by female poets include Teresa Hooley's A War Film, Jessie Pope's War Girls, Pauline B. Barrington's Education, and Mary H.J. Henderson's An Incident. In addition to giving women greater access to work, the war also gave women greater artistic freedom and space to express their identities as artists.

== Novels ==
A common subject for fiction in the 1920s and 1930s was the effect of the war, including shell shock and the huge social changes caused by the war. From the latter half of the 20th century onward, World War I continued to be a popular subject for fiction, mainly novels.

=== Contemporary ===
Alfred Noyes is often portrayed by hostile critics as a militarist and jingoist despite being a pacifist in life. In 1913, when it seemed that war might yet be avoided, he published a long anti-war poem called The Wine Press. During World War I, Noyes was debarred by defective eyesight from serving at the front. Instead, from 1916, he did his military service on attachment to the Foreign Office, where he worked with John Buchan on propaganda. This included work as a literary figure, writing morale-boosting short stories and exhortatory odes and lyrics recalling England's military past and asserting the morality of her cause. These works are forgotten today apart from two ghost stories, "The Lusitania Waits" and "The Log of the Evening Star", which are still occasionally reprinted in collections of tales of the uncanny.

Im Westen nichts Neues ("All Quiet on the Western Front"), Erich Maria Remarque's best-selling book about World War I, was translated into 28 languages with world sales nearly reaching 4 million in 1930. The work of fiction, and the award-winning film adaptation have had a greater influence in shaping public views of the war than the work of any historian. John Galsworthy's perspective was quite different in 1915 when he wrote

Those of us who are able to look back from thirty years hence on this tornado of death — will conclude with a dreadful laugh that if it had never come, the state of the world would be very much the same. It is not the intention of these words to deny the desperate importance of this conflict now that it has been joined ...

Remarque's book was partly based on Henri Barbusse's 1916 novel Under Fire. Barbusse was a French journalist who served as a stretcher-bearer on the front lines, and his book was very influential in its own right at the time. By the end of the war, it had sold almost 250,000 copies and read by servicemen of many nations.

American novelist, John Dos Passos, was a volunteer ambulance driver during the war. He wrote his first novel, the anti-war One Man's Initiation: 1917, in the trenches (later published in 1920.) The book was reprinted in 1945, under the title First Encounter. His postwar war novel, Three Soldiers, brought him fame and critical recognition.

British novelist Mary Augusta Ward wrote generally pro-war novels, some at the request of United States President Theodore Roosevelt, which nevertheless raised questions about the war. These include England's Effort (1916), Towards the Goal (1917), Missing (1917), The War and Elizabeth (1917) and Fields of Victory (1919).

Some pre-existing popular literary characters were placed by their authors in World War I-related adventures during or directly after the war. These include Tom Swift (Tom Swift and His Aerial Warship in 1915 and Tom Swift and His Air Scout in 1919), Sherlock Holmes (His Last Bow, 1917) and Tarzan (Tarzan the Untamed, 1920).

=== Post-war ===
A.P. Herbert was one of the first combatants to publish a novel about the war, The Secret Battle (1919). This was followed in subsequent years by others, including Through the Wheat (1923) by Thomas Alexander Boyd, the "Spanish Farm Trilogy"—Sixty-Four (1925), Ninety-Four (1925) and The Crime at Vanderlynden's (1926)—by Ralph Hale Mottram, Death of a Hero (1929) by Richard Aldington, The Middle Parts of Fortune (1929) by Frederic Manning, The Patriot's Progress (1930) by Henry Williamson, Generals Die in Bed by Charles Yale Harrison (1930) and Winged Victory (1934) by Victor Maslin Yeates.

Parade's End by Ford Madox Ford was a highly acclaimed tetralogy of novels, published between 1924 and 1927, that covers the events of World War I and the years around it from the viewpoint of a government statistician who becomes an officer in the British Army during the war. The novels were based on Ford's experience in the war after he had enlisted at the age of 41.

Willa Cather wrote One of Ours in 1922, and won the Pulitzer Prize in 1923 for her novel that tells the story of Claude Wheeler, a Nebraska farmer who escapes a loveless marriage to fight in the War. Critics like H.L. Mencken and Sinclair Lewis panned the book, mostly because it romanticised war. Cather based Claude Wheeler on her cousin G.P. Cather, who was killed in 1918 at the Battle of Cantigny in France.

May Sinclair volunteered with the Munro Ambulance Corps in 1914 and published her account of the front in Belgium as A Journal of Impressions in Belgium (1915). She followed this with three novels about the war, Tasker Jevons (1916), The Tree of Heaven (1917) and The Romantic (1920). Journalist Evadne Price wrote a semi-biographical novel Not So Quiet: Stepdaughters of War (1930) about ambulance drivers based on women she had interviewed.

W. Somerset Maugham's Ashenden: Or the British Agent (1928), a collection of short stories, was based on the author's experience with British Intelligence during the war. It was loosely adapted into the film Secret Agent (1936), directed by Alfred Hitchcock, and a 1991 BBC TV series.

German author Hans Herbert Grimm wrote a novel Schlump in 1928 which was published anonymously due to its satirical and anti-war tone, loosely based on the author's experiences as a military policeman in German-occupied France during WW1. The novel was banned by the Nazis in 1933 and Grimm was not credited as the author until 2013.

British novelist W.F. Morris wrote two mystery novels set in the Great War- Bretherton (1929) and Behind the Lines (1930). Morris served in the British army during the war.

A Farewell to Arms is a novel by Ernest Hemingway set during the Italian campaign. The book, published in 1929, is a first-person account of an American, Frederic Henry, serving as a lieutenant ("Tenente") in the ambulance corps of the Italian Army. The novel is about a love affair between the expatriate American Henry and Catherine Barkley against the backdrop of the war, cynical soldiers, fighting and the displacement of populations. The publication of A Farewell to Arms cemented Hemingway's stature as a modern American writer, became his first best-seller and is described by biographer Michael Reynolds as "the premier American war novel from that debacle World War I."

The popular literary characters Biggles and Bulldog Drummond were created by veterans of the war, W.E. Johns and H.C. McNeile respectively. Both characters served in the war and shared some their creators' history. The Bulldog Drummond books were popular among veterans after the war. Writers like Paul Fussell and Janet S.K. Watson have questioned '[w]hat role [...] memory play[s] in historical reconstruction' - arguing that retrospective accounts are often disillusioned.

French writer and former infantryman on the Western Front Gabriel Chevallier wrote a novel Fear in 1930, based on his experiences in the Great War. The novel was not published in English until 2011.

Although most famous for his popular Hornblower series of Napoleonic War adventure novels, C.S. Forester also wrote three novels set in the First World War. Of the three, only one- The General (1936) was set on the Western Front, the others The African Queen (1935), which was famously filmed in 1951, was set in German East Africa and Brown on Resolution (1929), was a naval adventure set in the Central Pacific. According to one source, Adolf Hitler admired the novel The General in the late 1930s and recommended it to his generals due to its depiction of the British military mindset.

Writer William March, who fought with the US Marines in France during World War I, wrote a novel Company K in 1933, loosely based on his experiences. Another American writer Dalton Trumbo wrote a bitterly anti-war novel Johnny Got His Gun in 1938 which won a National Book Award the following year and was made into a film in 1971. New Zealander John A Lee, who fought as an infantryman in World War I and who lost an arm, produced a novel Citizen into Soldier (1937) inspired by his experiences.

=== Late 20th-century and beyond ===
Novels concerning World War I continued to appear in the latter half of the 20th century, albeit less frequently.

The novel Return to the Wood (1955) by James Lansdale Hodson depicted the court-martial of a British soldier accused of desertion, and the book was adapted as the play Hamp in 1964 by John Wilson and filmed as King and Country by Joseph Losey in the same year.

The novel Covenant with Death (1961) by John Harris portrays a Sheffield Pals Battalion on the First day on the Somme in 1916 and Christopher Hitchens later referred to it as a 'neglected masterpiece'. In the mid-1960s, there was a resurgence of fiction depicting the aerial campaigns of World War I, including The Blue Max (1964) by Jack D. Hunter, which became a film in 1966 along with A Killing for the Hawks (1966) by Frederick E. Smith and In the Company of Eagles (1966) by Ernest K. Gann.

How Young They Died (1968) by Stuart Cloete was possibly the last novel written by a veteran. Elleston Trevor had made his name in the 1950s through espionage and WW2-themed novels but he turned to World War I with his novel Bury Him Among Kings (1970).

The novel Goshawk Squadron (1971) by Derek Robinson depicts a British squadron in the closing months of World War I, was shortlisted for the Booker Prize and was later followed by two 'prequels' set earlier in the conflict, War Story (1987) and Hornet's Sting (1999). Three Cheers for Me (1962) and its sequel That's Me in the Middle (1973) by Donald Jack, are narrated by fictional Canadian air ace Bart Bandy; both won the Leacock Medal. Canadian novelist Timothy Findley's novel of the conflict The Wars was published in 1977 and it received his country's Governor General's Award for English-language fiction for literature.

War Horse (1982) by Michael Morpurgo is set in World War I and won the Whitbread Book Award for 1982. It has been adapted into a play and film. US writer Mark Helprin's A Soldier of the Great War and French novelist Sebastien Japrisot's A Very Long Engagement both appeared in 1991. The novel Birdsong (1993) by Sebastian Faulks received much praise.

Of similar acclaim is Pat Barker's Regeneration Trilogy; the third novel from the series, The Ghost Road, received the most prestigious award in British fiction, The Booker Prize in 1995 (though the nomination implied the award was for the whole series). In 2014, during the centenary of the World War I, the Indian author Akhil Katyal published the poem 'Some letters of Indian soldiers at World War One' marking the contribution of more than a million Indian soldiers to the war.

To the Last Man: A Novel of the First World War (2004) is a novel written by Jeff Shaara that uses perspectives from the generals and the doughboys and from the Allies and the Germans.

The 2011 novel The Absolutist was written by John Boyne, the story featuring two teenage friends who enlist in the British army together and experience the war on the Western Front. The 2016 novel No Man's Land by Simon Tolkien (grandson of J. R. R. Tolkien) portrays a working-class boy who has been adopted by a wealthy family and who interrupts his Oxford studies to serve in the trenches.

The 2017 novel Kings of Broken Things by Theodore Wheeler follows the Miihlstein family as they are displaced by fighting in Galicia during World War I and flee to Omaha, Nebraska. The novel depicts the struggles of displaced people to build a new life during the war and dramatises the lynching of Will Brown in Omaha during the Red Summer that followed the war.

== Memoirs ==
Captain John Hay Beith's The First Hundred Thousand, a best-selling account of life in the army, was published in 1915 and became one of the more popular books of the period. It was translated into French as Les Premiers Cent Mille. Due to its popularity in the United States, which was neutral at the time, Beith was transferred to the British War Mission in Washington, D.C.

The memoirs of several famous aerial 'aces' were published during the war, including Winged Warfare (1918) by Canadian William Bishop, Flying Fury (1918) by English ace James McCudden and The Red Fighter Pilot (1917) by Manfred von Richthofen (the latter two men were killed in action after their books were written).

After the war many participants published their memoirs and diaries. One of the first was Storm of Steel (1920) by German writer Ernst Jünger, an account of his experiences as an officer on the Western Front (it was first published in English in 1930). The first memoirs of Allied combatants were published in 1922, not long after the armistice: A Tank Driver's Experiences by Arthur Jenkins and Disenchantment by Charles Edward Montague. These were shortly joined with Undertones of War (1928) by Edmund Blunden, Good-Bye to All That (1929) by Robert Graves, A Subaltern's War (1929) by Charles Edmund Carrington, A Passionate Prodigality (1933) by Guy Chapman and Blasting and Bombardiering (1937) by Percy Wyndham Lewis. Memoirs of airmen included Wind in the Wires (1933) by Duncan Grinnell-Milne, Wings of War (1933) by Rudolf Stark and Sagittarius Rising (1936) by Cecil Arthur Lewis. Nurses also published memoirs of their wartime experiences, such as A Diary without Dates (1918) by Enid Bagnold, Forbidden Zone (1929) by Mary Borden, Testament of Youth (1933) by Vera Brittain and We That Were Young (1932) by Irene Rathbone.

Some Great War memoirs were not published until late in the 20th century or beyond, sometimes because the author did not write them until later in life or because they had been unable to, or had chosen not to, have them published at the time of writing (as a result, some manuscripts were published posthumously). One example was Poilu by French writer, barrel-maker and political activist Louis Barthas, a memoir written shortly after the war but not published until 1978 (the author died in 1952).The book described the author's experiences as a corporal in the French army on the Western Front.

British WW1 veteran George Coppard published his memoir With a Machine-Gun to Cambrai in 1968 while former airman Arthur Gould Lee produced his own memoir No Parachute the same year.

The memoir Somme Mud was written in the 1920s but not published until 2006, over two decades after the author's death. The author, Australian Edward Francis Lynch, fought with the AIF in France in 1916–1918.

The Burning of the World, first published in 2014, was a memoir of the Great War on the Eastern Front by Hungarian writer & painter Bela Zombory-Moldovan who enlisted in the Austro-Hungarian Army in 1914 at age 29.

== Theatre ==
Plays about World War I include:

- Journey's End (1928), by R. C. Sherriff
- The Silver Tassie (1928), by Sean O'Casey
- Post-Mortem (1930), by Noël Coward
- For Services Rendered (1932), by Somerset Maugham
- The One Day of the Year (1958), by Alan Seymour
- Oh, What a Lovely War! (1963), by Joan Littlewood
- The Accrington Pals (1982), by Peter Whelan
- Not About Heroes (1982), by Stephen MacDonald
- Once on Chunuk Bair (1982), by Maurice Shadbolt
- Observe the Sons of Ulster Marching Towards the Somme (1985), by Frank McGuinness
- My Boy Jack (1997), by David Haig
- An August Bank Holiday Lark (2014), by Deborah McAndrew
- Anzac Eve (2017), by Dave Armstrong

== French literature on WWI ==
=== Novels inspired by the author's experiences ===
- Le Feu : journal d'une escouade / Henri Barbusse
- La Percée : roman d'un fantassin (1914-1915) / Jean Bernier
- L'Appel du sol / Adrien Bertrand
- Voyage au bout de la nuit / Louis Ferdinand Céline
- La Peur / Gabriel Chevallier
- Les Poilus / Joseph Delteil
- Les Croix de Bois / Roland Dorgelès
- Ceux de 14 / Maurice Genevoix
- Solitude de la Pitié / Jean Giono
- Le Grand troupeau / Jean Giono
- Les Silences du colonel Bramble; suivi des Discours et nouveaux discours du Docteur O'Grady / André Maurois
- Capitaine Conan / Roger Vercel
- Clavel soldat / Léon Werth

=== Other French novels ===
- La Sentinelle tranquille sous la lune / Soazig Aaron
- Les Beaux quartiers / Louis Aragon
- La Maison rose / Pierre Bergounioux
- Comme le temps passe / Robert Brasillach
- Les Ames grises / Philippe Claudel
- Meuse l'oubli / Philippe Claudel
- Les Roses de Verdun / Bernard Clavel
- Thomas l'imposteur / Jean Cocteau
- Le Der des ders / Didier Daeninckx
- La Comédie de Charleroi / Pierre Drieu la Rochelle
- La Chambre des officiers / Marc Dugain
- Le Monument : roman vrai / Claude Duneton
- 14 / Jean Echenoz
- Dans la guerre / Alice Ferney
- Partita / Roger Grenier
- Le Palais d'hiver / Roger Grenier
- Le Sang noir / Louis Guilloux
- Derrière la colline / Xavier Hanotte
- De secrètes injustices / Xavier Hanotte
- Les Lieux communs / Xavier Hanotte
- Un Long dimanche de fiançailles / Sébastien Japrisot
- Waltenberg / Hédi Kaddour
- L'Equipage / Joseph Kessel
- Le Chercheur d'or / Jean-Marie-Gustave Le Clézio
- Au revoir là-haut / Pierre Lemaître
- Les Thibault (n°1-2-3) / Roger Martin du Gard
- Le Bruit du vent / Hubert Mingarelli
- Quatre soldats / Hubert Mingarelli
- Les Enfants de la patrie (n° 1-2-3-4) / Pierre Miquel
- La Poudrière d'Orient (n° 1-2-3-4) / Pierre Miquel
- La Liberté guidait leurs pas (n° 1-2-3-4) / Pierre Miquel
- Le Diable au corps / Raymond Radiguet
- Les Hommes de bonne volonté (n° 1-2-3-4) / Jules Romains
- Les Champs d'honneur / Jean Rouaud
- Le Collier rouge / Jean-Christophe Rufin
- L'Acacia / Claude Simon
- Bachir, le brave tirailleur / Idir Tas
- Quatre soldats français (n° 1-2-3-4) / Jean Vautrin
- Alexis ou le traité du vain combat; suivi de Le Coup de Grâce / Marguerite Yourcenar

== German literature on WWI ==
- Im Westen nichts Neues / Erich Maria Remarque
- War / Ludwig Renn

== See also ==
- British women's literature of World War I
- Fiction based on World War I
- World War I in popular culture
- World War II in popular culture
