= Keown =

Keown (/ˈkiːoʊn, kiˈoʊn, kjoʊn/ KEE-ohn, kee-OHN, KYOHN) is an Irish surname historically associated with Ulster. It derives from the Gaelic Mac Eoin, meaning "son of Eoin," Eoin being the Irish name for John. The name is thought to date to the 12th century and was historically borne by members of the Gaelic nobility.

== History ==
=== Etymology and Variants ===
As an anglicized form of Mac Eoin, Keown emerged alongside related variants such as Kewin and McKeown, reflecting a broader historical anglicization of Irish surnames during British rule in Ireland.

== Notable people ==
The following individuals have the surname:

- Anna Gordon Keown (1899–1957), an English author and poet
- Dale Keown (b. 1962), Canadian comic book artist
- Damien Keown (b. 1951), a prominent bioethicist and authority on Buddhist bioethics
- Martin Keown (b. 1966), former English footballer
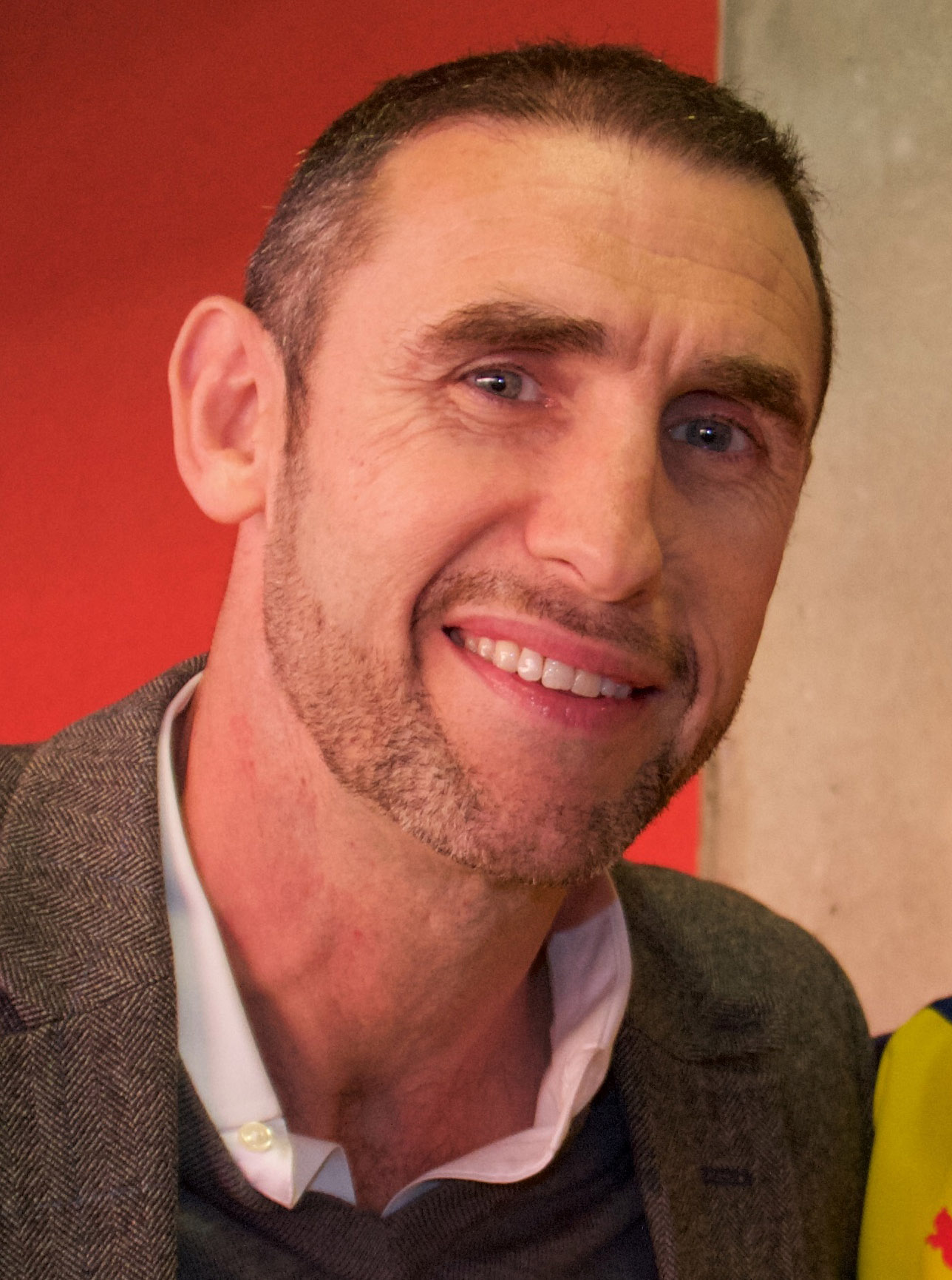
  Martin Keown
- Mike Keown (b. 1954), an American, Republican member of the Georgia House of Representatives
- Wayne Keown (born 1949), American professional wrestler better known as Dutch Mantel and Zeb Colter

== Notable Places ==
- Keown Station, Pennsylvania, a small community within Allegheny County, Pennsylvania
- Keown Bridge, Balfour, South Island, New Zealand
