= Anna Gordon =

Anna Gordon may refer to:

- Anna Adams Gordon (1853–1931), American social reformer
- Anna Gordon Keown (1899–1957), English author
- Anna Gordon (ballad collector) (1747–1810), Scottish ballad collector
- S. Anna Gordon (1832–?), physician and author

== See also ==
- Anne Gordon (born 1941), cricketer
- Annabella Gordon (disambiguation)
