= Eva Dobell =

British poet (1876–1963)

Eva Dobell (1876 – 1963) was a British poet, nurse, and editor, best known for her poems on the effects of World War I and her regional poems.

== Biography ==
Eva was the daughter of Wine Merchant and local historian Clarence Dobell from Cheltenham. She volunteered to join the Voluntary Aid Detachment (VAD) as a nurse in World War I. Her experiences in the VAD prompted her to write poetry about, inter alia, wounded and maimed soldiers which has been well-thought of by many versed in the ways of poetry. She also took part in the morale-boosting work of writing to prisoners of war. Her full name was Eveline Jessie Dobell and she was born the youngest of three children on 30 January 1876 at the Grove, Charlton Kings in Gloucestershire, England. She died on 3 September 1963 at the age of 87 years at which time her home address was Abbeyholme, Overton Rd, Cheltenham. She never married. Her mother was Emily Anne Duffield a native of Manchester, England.

== Poetry ==
While she was also known in her time as a regional poet (one of her Gloucestershire poems was recently set to music), Dobell is best known today for her occasional poems from the war period, which all describe wounded soldiers, their experiences, and their bleak prospects. A few of these poems are widely dispersed on the internet, and these continue to receive some scholarly acknowledgment. "Night Duty," for instance, is cited as one of many poems by female war-poets and nurses that provide access to an experience rarely shared by male poets such as Wilfred Owen and Siegfried Sassoon. A similar comment was made by John Oxenham in his foreword to Mary H. J. Henderson's 1918 collection, In War and Peace: Songs of a Scotswoman, some of which are based on her experiences in Serbia, with the Scottish Women's Hospitals for Foreign Service, namely it is a 'vision of war seen from the inside, and finding expression through the woman-poet's mind'.

Perhaps the most frequently reproduced is "Pluck," especially on sites dedicated to the Great War. "Pluck" also found its way into printed anthologies such as The Cambridge Companion to the Literature of the First World War, and was even set to music.

After the war, she continued to write; in all, she published half a dozen books of poetry, a verse drama, and edited a book of poems by Lady Margaret Sackville.

== Bibliography ==
=== Well-known poems ===
- "(In A Soldier's Hospital I) Pluck"
- "Advent 1916"
- "Night Duty"
- "(In A Soldiers' Hospital II) Gramophone Tunes"

=== Books of poetry ===
- Songs and Sonnets. London: Elkin Mathews, 1902.
- A Bunch of Cotswold Grasses. London: A.H. Stockwell, 1919.
- Snap-shots of Travel. London: Erskine Macdonald, 1925.
- Youths and the Swallows and Other Verse. London: Favil Press, 1942.
- A Gloucestershire Year. Bradford: Jongleur Press, 1949.
- Verses New and Old. London: Favil Press, 1959.

=== Verse drama ===
- A Woodland Tale: A Phantasy. London: George Allen and Sons, 1909.

=== Book edited ===
- Margaret Sackville. A Poet's Return: Some Later Poems of Lady Margaret Sackville. Cheltenham: Burrow's Press, 1940.

=== Anthologies ===
- S. Fowler Wright, ed. The County Series of Contemporary Poetry No. VII. Gloucester: The Empire Poetry League, 1927. "The Roman Camp" and "The Faery Wood."
- Catherine W. Reilly, ed. Scars Upon My Heart: Women’s Poetry and Verse of the First World War. London: Virago Press, 1982.
- Vincent Sherry, ed. The Cambridge Companion to the Literature of the First World War. Cambridge: Cambridge UP, 2005. ISBN 978-0-521-52897-9. "Pluck."
- Johnny Coppin. The Gloucestershire Collection. Red Sky, 1994. "Tom's Long Post," set to music.
