= John Cunliffe =

John Cunliffe may refer to:

- John Cunliffe (author) (1933–2018), English author, creator of Postman Pat and presenter of the first two series of Rosie & Jim
- John Cunliffe (footballer, born 1930) (1930–1975), English footballer
- John Cunliffe (footballer, born 1984), English footballer
- John William Cunliffe (1865–1946), English author, former chairman of Columbia University

== See also ==
- Jack Cunliffe, rugby league footballer
- John Cunliffe Pickersgill-Cunliffe, British Member of Parliament
- Jon Cunliffe, British civil servant
