= Joan Hoff =

American historian (born 1937)

- Born: June 27, 1937 (age 89); Butte, Montana, U.S.
- Other name: Joan Hoff-Wilson
- Education: University of Montana, Cornell University, University of California, Berkeley
- Occupations: Historian, academic, research professor, editor, author
- Known for: U.S. foreign policy, U.S. political history, biographies, women's history, law history

Joan Hoff (born June 27, 1937), also known as Joan Hoff-Wilson, is an American historian, research professor, editor, and author. She specializes in U.S. foreign policy, U.S. political history, biographies, women's history, and law history. Hoff is the former director of the Contemporary History Institute at Ohio University. She has worked at California State University, Sacramento; Arizona State University; Indiana University; and Montana State University.

== Biography ==
Joan Hoff was born on June 27, 1937, in Butte, Montana. She attended the University of Montana where she received a BA degree (1957); Cornell University where she received a MA degree (1959) and was a Woodrow Wilson Fellow; and University of California, Berkeley where she received a PhD (1966). Hoff received a Fulbright Award (1958 to 1959) for study at the University of Strasbourg.

Hoff has taught at the following universities and colleges: the College of San Mateo; California State University, Sacramento from 1967 to 1970; Arizona State University from 1970 to 1976; Dartmouth College; Indiana University from 1981 to 1998; Ohio University from 1998 to ?; and Montana State University.

Historian Susan Kingsley Kent criticized Hoff's article, Gender as a postmodern category of paralysis (1994, Women's History Review), as it "breaks no new intellectual ground, but for anti-intellectualism, disingenuousness, and sheer incivility". In the 1990s, she has appeared as a panelist in discussions broadcast by C-SPAN.

in 1981, Hoff was awarded a Guggenheim Fellowship in the field of U.S. history. She has also received the Vivian Paladin Award, and fellowships to the Woodrow Wilson International Center for Scholars and the Radcliffe Institute, as well as a National Endowment of the Humanities research grant.

She retired in 2001 and lives between Big Sky, Montana and New York City, as of 2003.

== Books ==
- Hoff Wilson, Joan (1971). American Business and Foreign Policy: 1920–1933. Vol. 10 (1st ed.). University Press of Kentucky. ISBN 9780813112169.
- Hoff, Joan (1986). Rights of Passage: the past and future of the ERA. Organization of American Historians. Bloomington, Indiana: Indiana University Press. ISBN 9780253350138.
- Hoff, Joan (1992). Law, Gender, and Injustice: A Legal History of U.S. Women. New York University Press. ISBN 9780814734940.
- Hoff Wilson, Joan (1992). Herbert Hoover: Forgotten Progressive. Waveland Press. ISBN 9781478631163.
- Hoff, Joan (1994). Nixon Reconsidered. Basic Books. ISBN 978-0-465-05107-6.
- Hoff, Joan (2007). A Faustian Foreign Policy from Woodrow Wilson to George W. Bush: Dreams of Perfectibility. Cambridge University Press. ISBN 9781139468596.
- Hoff, Joan (2000). The Cooper's Wife is Missing: The Trials of Bridget Cleary. Basic Books. ISBN 978-0-465-03087-3.
