= Winifred M. Letts =

Anglo-Irish poet, playwright, and novelist (1882–1972)

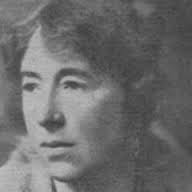
- Born: Winifred Mabel Letts; 10 February 1882
- Died: 7 June 1972 (aged 90); Dublin, Ireland
- Other name: W. M. Letts
- Occupations: Poet, novelist, playwright

Winifred M. Letts (10 February 1882 – 7 June 1972) was a writer who spent most of her life in Ireland. She was known for her poetry, novels, and plays.

== Biography ==
Winifred Mabel Letts was born on 10 February 1882 to Mary Isabel (née Ferrier) and Reverend Ernest Frederick Letts. (Note: Although the name is widely repeated across the internet, there is no official record of Letts publishing as Winifred Mary Letts. The Dictionary of Irish Biography refers to her as Winifred Mabel Letts, which is the name that is registered on birth, marriage, and death records (See Dictionary of Irish Biography, p. np . Throughout her career, she published as W. M. Letts.) It is widely accepted by biographers that she was born in Salford, Lancashire, England. She was educated first at St. Anne’s School, Abbots Bromley, Staffordshire and later Alexandra College in Dublin, Ireland.

She spent summer childhood holidays in Knockmaroon Park, Dublin, her maternal grandparents' home. After her father's death, she and her mother moved to Ireland from England and lived on Glenart Avenue and, later, on Avoca Avenue, in a house called Dal Riada, in the Dublin suburb of Blackrock.

In 1915, during World War I, Letts joined the Volunteer Aid Detachment and was assigned to the Manchester Base Hospital in England. Trained to offer physical therapy to wounded soldiers, she served with the Almeric Paget Massage Corps in Manchester and Alnwick, Northumberland.

In 1926 she married widower William Henry Foster Verschoyle. William died in 1943 and Letts moved to England to live with her sisters in Faversham, Kent.

In the 1950s, she returned to Ireland and purchased Beech Cottage in Killiney, County Dublin. She moved to Tivoli Nursing Home, Dún Laoghaire, in the late 1960s. Letts died on 7 June 1972 and is buried in Rathcoole, County Dublin. A memorial plaque celebrating her life and work was unveiled in Rathcoole by President Michael D. Higgins on 20 June 2022.

== Writing career ==
Letts was active in the artistic circles of Dublin. She was a member of the Irish Women Writers' Club. She collaborated with several artists at the Cuala Press to create illustrated broadsides of her poems.

=== Poetry ===
Letts is remembered today as a poet of the First World War; however, her first publications were lyric poetry exploring Irish folk themes popularised by the Celtic Revival. An early poem, 'The Sense of Faery', was published in 1904 in the English literary magazine Occasional Papers, with further poetry appearing in the Westminster Gazette and the Manchester City News (1906). Her first poetry collection, Songs from Leinster, was published in 1913. In 1916, by which time she was working as a nurse, she published Hallowe'en and Other Poems of the War. The collection was re-issued in 1917 as The Spires of Oxford, and Other Poems.

The publisher's preface to The Spires of Oxford stated, ‘The verdict of the public, as shown by continual requests to republish, is that The Spires of Oxford is the most important poem in the volume—and therefore in issuing a new edition with several new poems, we bow to this verdict and give The Spires of Oxford its place in the forefront of the volume’. The poem 'The Spires of Oxford' appeared in at least two anthologies published in America during the war, John William Cunliffe’s Poems of the Great War (1916) and George Herbert Clarke’s A Treasury of War Poetry (1917). Two lines from the poem are inscribed on the Soldiers Memorial Gate at Brown University, dedicated in 1921: 'They gave their merry youth away / For country and for God'.

Until the 1980s, Letts’s war poetry was largely forgotten. In his 1922 Anthology of Irish Verse, Padraic Colum included 'Synge’s Grave' rather than her war poems. As contemporary literary critics point out, poetry that privileged men’s experience of combat and that forged new directions in modernism was preferred over works that described the experiences of women during the war, particularly those on the Home Front. Stacy Gillis points to a new interest in women's experience that emerged in the 1980s and 1990s, when several critical studies of women’s war poetry were published, as well as the 1981 anthology Scars Upon My Heart, which included several poems by Letts.

Recent assessments of Letts’s war poetry have pointed to her use of irony in war poems such as 'What Reward?', 'Screens', and 'The Deserter'. 'Letts is at her best when she tackles the casualties largely left out of the official narrative', Jim Haughey writes. Jane Dowson also focuses on the 'anti-heroic' aspects of poems such as 'The Deserter'.

However, David Clare notes the complicated legacy of Letts’s war poems within Irish history: ‘World War I's problematic status in Irish memory has meant that the Irish literary canon (as it is currently conceived) still has a hard time accommodating works that are simultaneously very Irish and yet also bound up with the British effort in the World War’.

=== Plays ===
Letts recalled her first experience with the Abbey Theatre in an essay titled 'My First Abbey Play'. She saw John Millington Synge’s Riders to the Sea, with Sara Allgood and William Fay. Augusta Gregory and W. B. Yeats were in the stalls. She remembered that 'the spells of Synge’s speech and tragedy lay upon me. I was eager to write something in the same medium'. The play that emerged was the one-act play about a murder in Wicklow, The Eyes of the Blind. It was produced at the Abbey for one performance on 1 April 1907 and starred Frank Fay, W. G. Fay, Molly Allgood (Máire O’Neill), and Brigid O’Dempsey. A second one-act play, The Challenge, the story of a love triangle and a duel, premiered at the Abbey Theatre 14 September 1909. She rewrote The Challenge as a story, which was published in the Irish Review in 1912. Her only three-act play, Hamilton and Jones, was produced by the Gate Theatre, Dublin in 1941.

Between 1848 and 1952, Letts published a number of essays about the Abbey Theatre in English and Irish magazines.

=== Novels and short fiction ===
Letts’s early literary success came from novels for girls, such as Bridget of All Work (1909) and The Quest of the Blue Rose (1910). An early short story appeared in Cassell's Magazine. Letts's story 'The Company of Saints and of Angels' was published by The Irish Review under the editorship of Thomas MacDonagh in January 1912.

=== Memoir ===
Knockmaroon (1933) is a series of essays and poems about Ireland that opens with Letts’s reminiscences about her summers with grandparents on the outskirts of Phoenix Park. She includes a number of character sketches of Irish people of all classes and often refers to the events of the decade after the Anglo-Irish Treaty as 'the Troublesome Times'. The book is primarily pastoral in imagery, ranging descriptively over impressions of landscape and architecture. Letts also includes several chapters on gardening and garden books, confessing, 'My secret ambition has always been to write a garden book'. Knockmaroon gathered together a series of essays that previously appeared in publications such as Cornhill, Spectator, Manchester Guardian, Irish Review, Irish Statesman, Month, and Country Life.

== Works ==
=== Fiction and poetry ===
- The Story-Spinner. Illustrated by F. Gardner. London: T. C. & E. C. Jack, 1907
- Waste Castle (a book for girls). Illustrated by John Jellico. London & Edinburgh: T. C. & E. C. Jack, 1907. Reprinted by Thomas Nelson and Sons, Ltd., London, 1916, 1918, 1920
- Bridget of All Work. Illustrated by James Durden. London: Hodder & Stoughton, 1909
- Diana Dethroned. London: John Lane, 1909
- The Quest of the Blue Rose. Illustrated by James Durden. London: Hodder & Stoughton, 1910. Reprinted by Oxford University Press: Humphrey Milford, London, 1926
- The Rough Way. London: Wells Gardner & Co. [1912]
- Naughty Sophia. Illustrated by Ruby Lind. London: Grant Richards 1912. Reprinted by London: The Richards Press, 1949
- The Mighty Army: Lives of the Saints. Illustrated by Stephen Reid. London: Wells Gardner, Darton & Co., 1912
- Songs of Leinster. London: John Murray, 1913. Reprinted 1916, 5th rep. 1923; 6th rep. 1938; with a new edition by Dundalgan Press, Dundalk, Ireland: 1947.
- Helmet & Cowl: Stories of Monastic and Military Orders. With Mary F. S. Letts. London: Wells Gardner, Darton & Co., 1914
- Christina’s Son. London: Wells Gardner & Co. 1915
- Hallow-e'en and Poems of the War. London: John Murray, 1916
- The Spires of Oxford, And Other Poems. New York: E.P. Dutton and Co., New York, 1917
- Corporal’s Corner. London: Wells Gardner & Co. 1919
- What Happened Then? London: Wells Gardner & Co. [1921]
- More Songs from Leinster. London: John Murray, 1926
- St Patrick the Travelling Man: The Story of his Life and Wanderings. London: Ivor Nicholson & Watson Ltd., 1932
- Pomona and Co. London: T. Nelson & Sons [1934]
- Pomona’s Island. Illustrated by Hilda Figorski. London: T. Nelson & Sons [1935]
- The Gentle Mountain. Illustrated by Kathleen Verschoyle. Dublin: Talbot Press [1938]. Reprinted by London: RTS [1939]

=== Plays ===
- The Eyes of the Blind (1906)
- The Challenge (1909)
- Hamilton and Jones (1941)

=== Memoir and essay ===
- Knockmaroon. London: John Murray 1933

=== Anthologies, selected ===
- Katherine Tynan and C. M. Watts. The Wild Harp. Sidgwick & Jackson, Ltd., 1913
- George Herbert Clarke. A Treasury of War Poetry: British and American Poems of the First World War, 1914–1917. Boston: Houghton Mifflin, 1917
- John William Cunliffe. Poems of the Great War. New York: Macmillan, 1918
- Sterling Andrus Leonard. Poems of the War and the Peace. New York: Harcourt, Brace, 1921
- Catherine Reilly. Scars Upon My Heart: Women’s Poetry and Verse of the First World War. Virago, London, 1981
- Constance M. Ruzich. International Poetry of the First World War: An Anthology of Lost Voices. London: Bloomsbury, 2020

=== Musical settings of poetry ===
- Edward Cuthbert Bairstow. “The Lonesome Girl”, words by W. M. Letts. London: Stainer & Bell, c. 1926
- Ina Boyle. "A Soft Day, Thank God!", words by W. M. Letts.
- Ina Boyle. “If you let sorrow in on you”, words by W. M. Letts. London: Stainer & Bell, 1923, 1926.
- Ina Boyle. “Easter Snow”, words by W. M. Letts. In Chamber Music, Songs for Voice and Piano. 1940.
- Rhoda Coghill, “Mary Moriarty”, words by Winifred M. Letts (1925)
- Ivor Gurney (as Michael Flood). "Cowslip time", words by Winifred M. Letts. [1919–1920].
- Ivor Gurney (as Michael Raphoe Flood). “The Fair”, words by Winifred M. Letts. [1920].
- Charles Villiers Stanford. “John Kelly,” words by W. M. Letts. In Four Songs for Voice and Piano, Op. 125. London : Stainer & Bell, 1911
- Charles Villiers Stanford. A Fire of Turf, Op. 139, words by W. M. Letts. London: Stainer & Bell, 1913. (Contains “A Fire of Turf”, “The Chapel on the Hill”, “Cowslip Time”, “Scared”, “Blackberry Time”, “The Fair”, “The West Wind”). Full text available at International Music Score Library Project (IMSLP) [https://imslp.org/wiki/A_Fire_of_Turf%2C_Op.139_(Stanford%2C_Charles_Villiers
- Charles Villiers Stanford. A Sheaf of Songs from Leinster, words by W. M. Letts. London: Stainer & Bell 1914. (Contains “Grandeur”, “Thief of the World”, “A Soft Day”, “Little Peter Morrissey”, “The Bold Unbiddable Child”, “Irish Skies”.) Full text available at International Music Score Library Project (IMSLP) [https://imslp.org/wiki/A_Sheaf_of_Songs_from_Leinster%2C_Op.140_(Stanford%2C_Charles_Villiers
- Charles Villiers Stanford. Six Songs, Op.175. London: J.B. Cramer and Co. Ltd., 1920. (Contains “Monkey's Carol” and “The Winds of Bethlehem” with words by W. M. Letts)
- Leslie Walters. "Spring, the Travelling Man", words by Winifred Letts. London: J. B. Cramer & Co., [1957]
- Charles Wood. "Tim, an Irish Terrier", words by Winifred Letts. (c.1913).
- Charles Wood. "Boys," (No date).
