= Carl W. Ackerman =

American journalist (1890–1970)

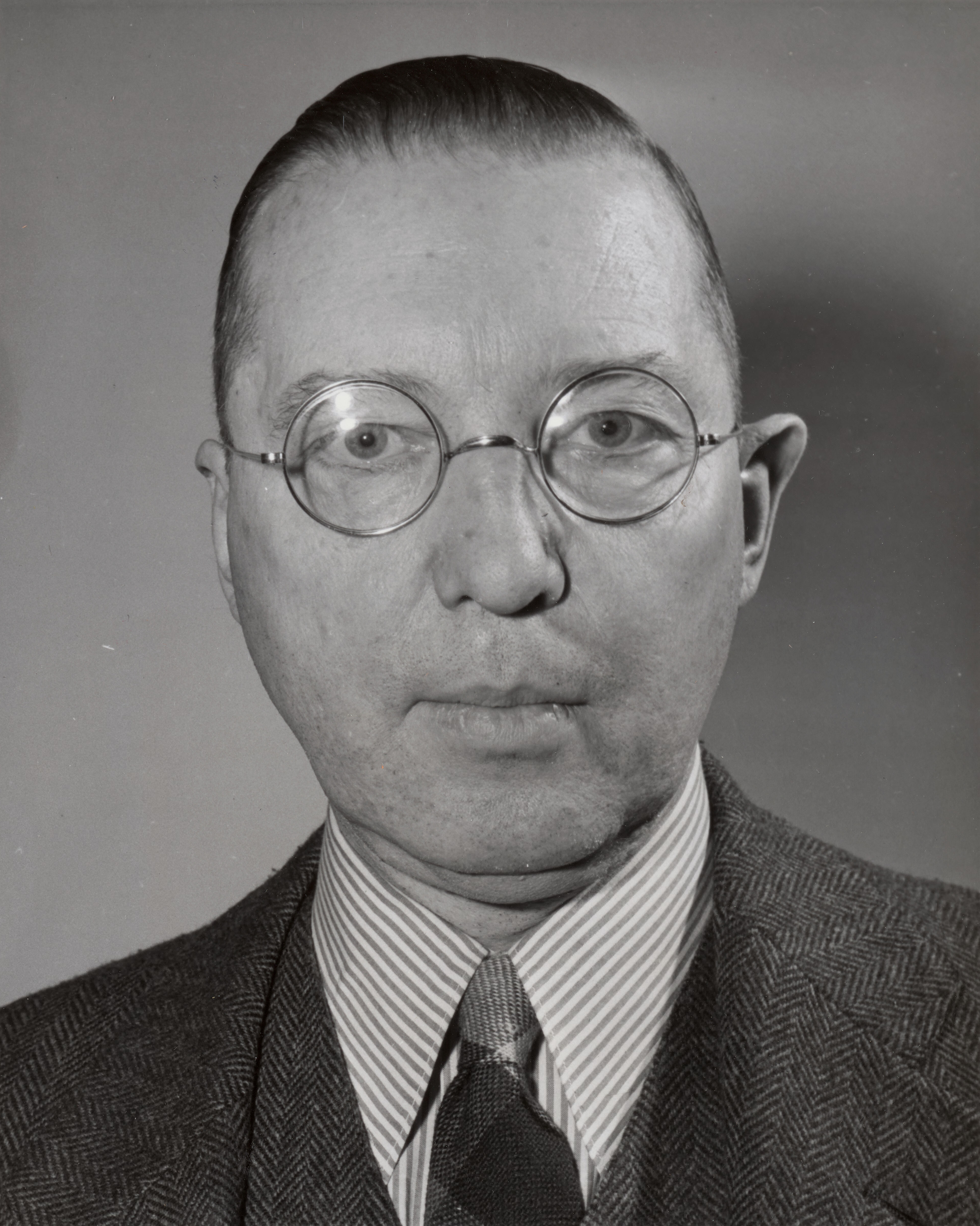
- Ackerman in 1947
- Born: January 16, 1890; Richmond, Indiana, U.S.
- Died: October 9, 1970 (aged 80); New York City, New York, U.S.
- Resting place: Hollywood Cemetery; Richmond, Virginia, U.S.
- Education: Earlham College
- Occupation: Journalist
- Known for: Public Ledger; School of Journalism at Columbia University
- Spouse: Mabel VanderHoof (m. 1914; died 1954)
- Children: 1

Carl William Ackerman (January 16, 1890 – October 9, 1970) was an American journalist, author and educational administrator, the first dean of the Columbia School of Journalism. In 1919, as a correspondent of the Public Ledger of Philadelphia, he published the first excerpts of an English translation of The Protocols of the Elders of Zion but changed the text so that it appeared to be a Bolshevik tract.

In 1931, he was appointed as the director of the journalism department, succeeding John William Cunliffe, and became the first dean of the newly-established graduate School of Journalism program at Columbia University. He was instrumental in developing the school through its first two decades, as he served in that position until 1954.

== Career as a journalist ==
Ackerman was born on January 16, 1890 in Richmond, Indiana. He graduated from Earlham College and worked as a correspondent in World War I with the United Press. He first gained public attention with his book, Germany, The Next Republic? (1917), which discussed the possibility of a successful democracy in post-Kaiser Germany. At the time, during World War I, his position was considered quite radical.

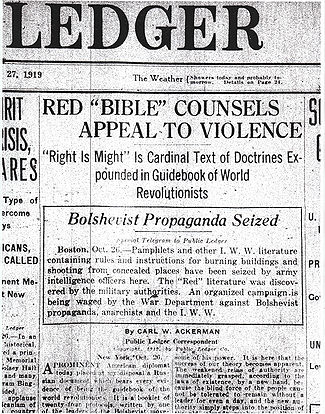
Red "Bible," Public Ledger (Philadelphia) October 27, 1919, by Carl W. Ackerman

Ackerman became a journalist with the Philadelphia Public Ledger. In 1919, he published articles headlined as "The Red Bible" that featured the first English edition of The Protocols of the Elders of Zion, an anti-Semitic hoax that had been published in Europe and recounted a Jewish plan for world domination. By replacing all the references to Jews with references to Bolsheviks, he turned it into an anti-Bolshevik hoax.

== Marriage and family ==
Ackerman married Mabel VanderHoof in 1914. They had one son, Robert VanderHoof Ackerman, who was born in 1915 when Ackerman was living in Berlin as a correspondent for the United Press Associations during World War I.

== Academic career ==
In 1931 Ackerman was recruited to serve as the director and, later, as the first dean, of Columbia University's School of Journalism graduate program. The Journalism Department was established in 1911 by an estate gift of Joseph Pulitzer, a major publisher in Saint Louis and New York City. The philanthropist's money was also used to establish the Pulitzer Prize awards in journalism, literature, drama and music.

Ackerman was a provocative figure; for instance, he accused the administration of President Franklin D. Roosevelt of fascism, and attempts to control journalism. Known to be reclusive, he worked to establish the school as one of the foremost schools of journalism in the nation.

He served on the board of trustees for Science Service, now known as Society for Science & the Public, from 1936 to 1938.

In 1954, after the death of his wife, Ackerman notified the university of his intention to resign, and after Columbia had found a replacement, he did so. In his later years, he was known to visit the university only occasionally.

== Death ==
Ackerman died on October 9, 1970, at his apartment in Manhattan. He was buried in Hollywood Cemetery in Richmond, Virginia.
