= Annabella Gordon =

Annabella Gordon may refer to:

- Annabella of Scotland, married name Annabella Gordon, daughter of James I of Scotland
- Annabella Brydon Gordon, mother of James Butler, 7th Marquess of Ormonde

== See also ==
- Anna Gordon (disambiguation)
