= Peyriac-Minervois =

Commune in Occitanie, France

- Commune
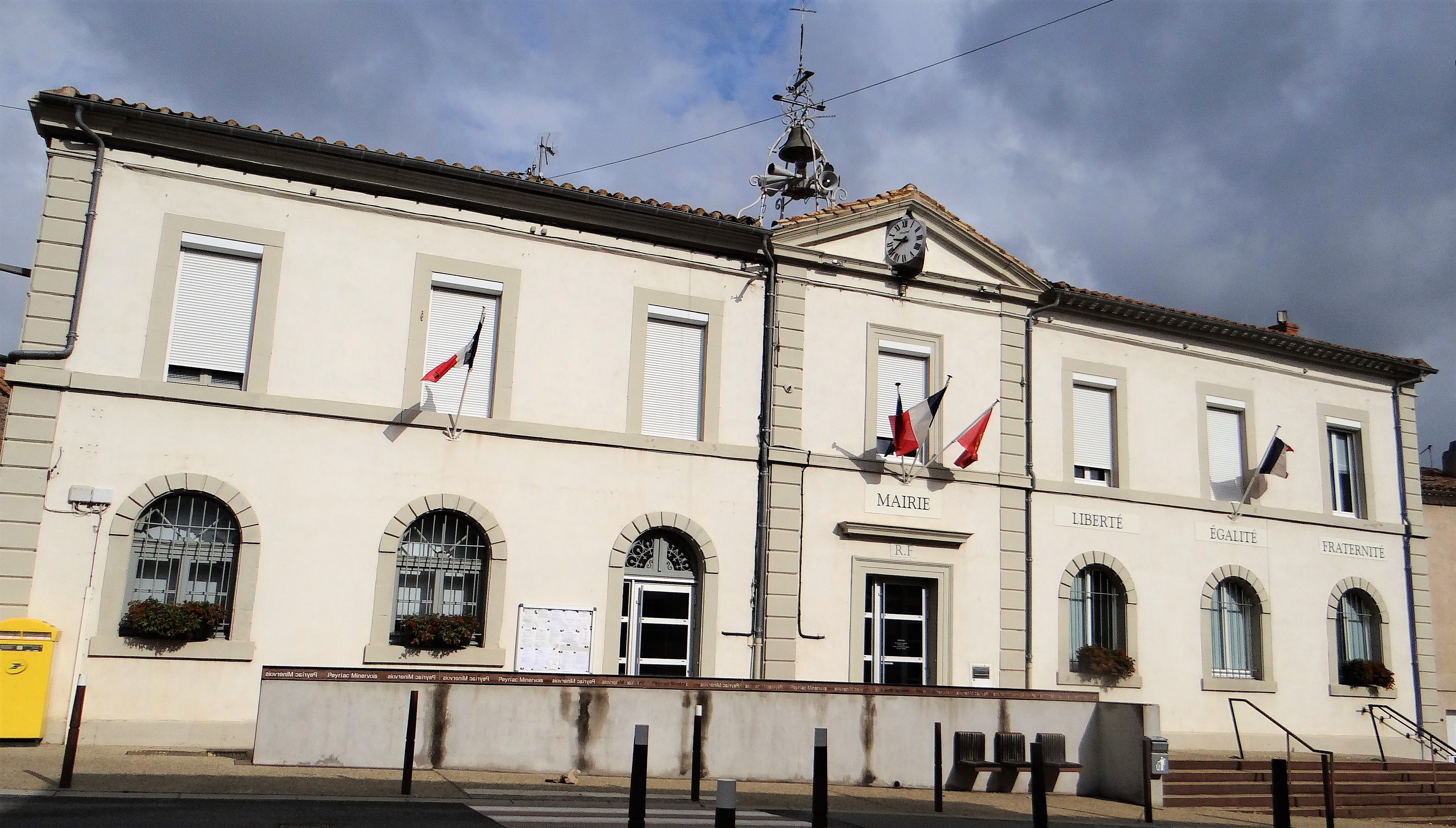
- Town hall

- Coat of arms
- Location of Peyriac-Minervois
- Location within France Location within Occitanie
- Coordinates: 43°17′32″N 2°34′05″E
- Country: France
- Region: Occitania
- Department: Aude
- Arrondissement: Carcassonne
- Canton: Le Haut-Minervois
- Intercommunality: Carcassonne Agglo

Government
  - Mayor (2020–2026): Denise Gils
- Area^{1}: 10.19 km^{2} (3.93 sq mi)
- Elevation: 137 m (449 ft)
- Highest elevation: 221 m (725 ft)
- Lowest elevation: 105 m (344 ft)
- Population (2023): 1,123
  - Density: 110.2/km^{2} (285.4/sq mi)
- Time zone: UTC+01:00 (CET)
  - Summer (DST): UTC+02:00 (CEST)
- INSEE/Postal code: 11286 /11160
- ^{1} French Land Register data, which excludes lakes, ponds, glaciers > 1 km^{2} (0.386 sq mi or 247 acres) and river estuaries.

Peyriac-Minervois (Peiriac de Menerbés in occitan) is a commune in the Aude department in southern France.

Historically and culturally speaking, the commune is in the Minervois country, a land of rolling hills with a reputation for its wine production. Peyriac-Minervois is under a mediterranean climate and is drained by the Argent-Double river.

Peyriac-Minervois is a rural commune of 1 177 inhabitants in 2020, that has lived a great population increase since 1975 thanks to its position in Carcassonne's area of attraction.

Points of interest include Peyriac's castle and historical centre, the Argent-Double river's banks, as well as the monument to peace and to Louis Barthas's work.

== Population ==
Historical population
| Year | Pop. | ±% p.a. |
|---|---|---|
| 1968 | 1,054 | — |
| 1975 | 1,041 | −0.18% |
| 1982 | 1,033 | −0.11% |
| 1990 | 1,053 | +0.24% |
| 1999 | 1,000 | −0.57% |
| 2007 | 1,048 | +0.59% |
| 2012 | 1,113 | +1.21% |
| 2017 | 1,139 | +0.46% |
| 2023 | 1,123 | −0.24% |
Source: INSEE

== Notable residents ==
- Louis Barthas (1879–1952), socialist, anti-militarist, barrelmaker and World War I diarist
- Hippolyte Babou (1824-1878), journalist, critic and novelist

== Gallery ==
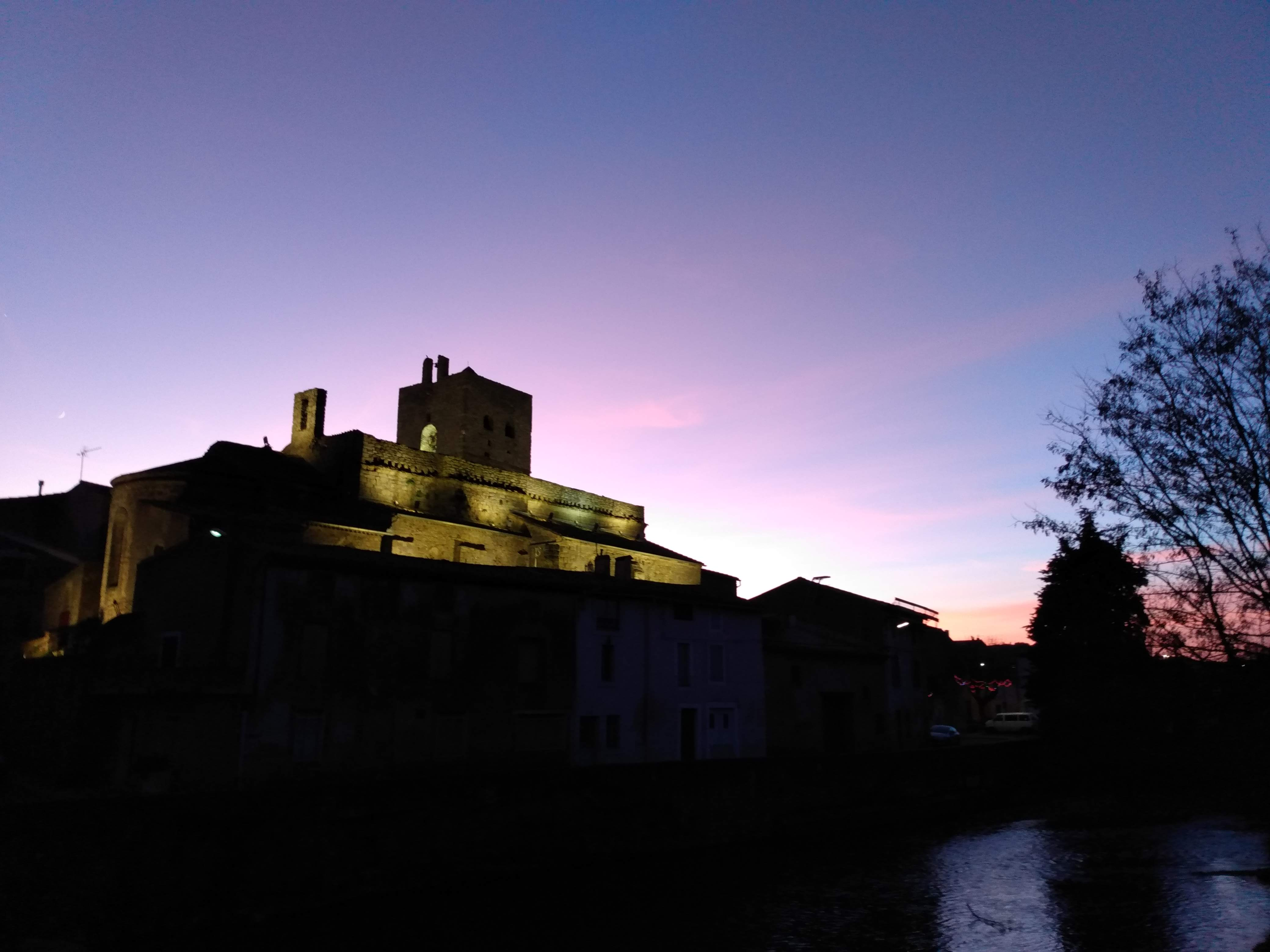
The church of Transfiguration

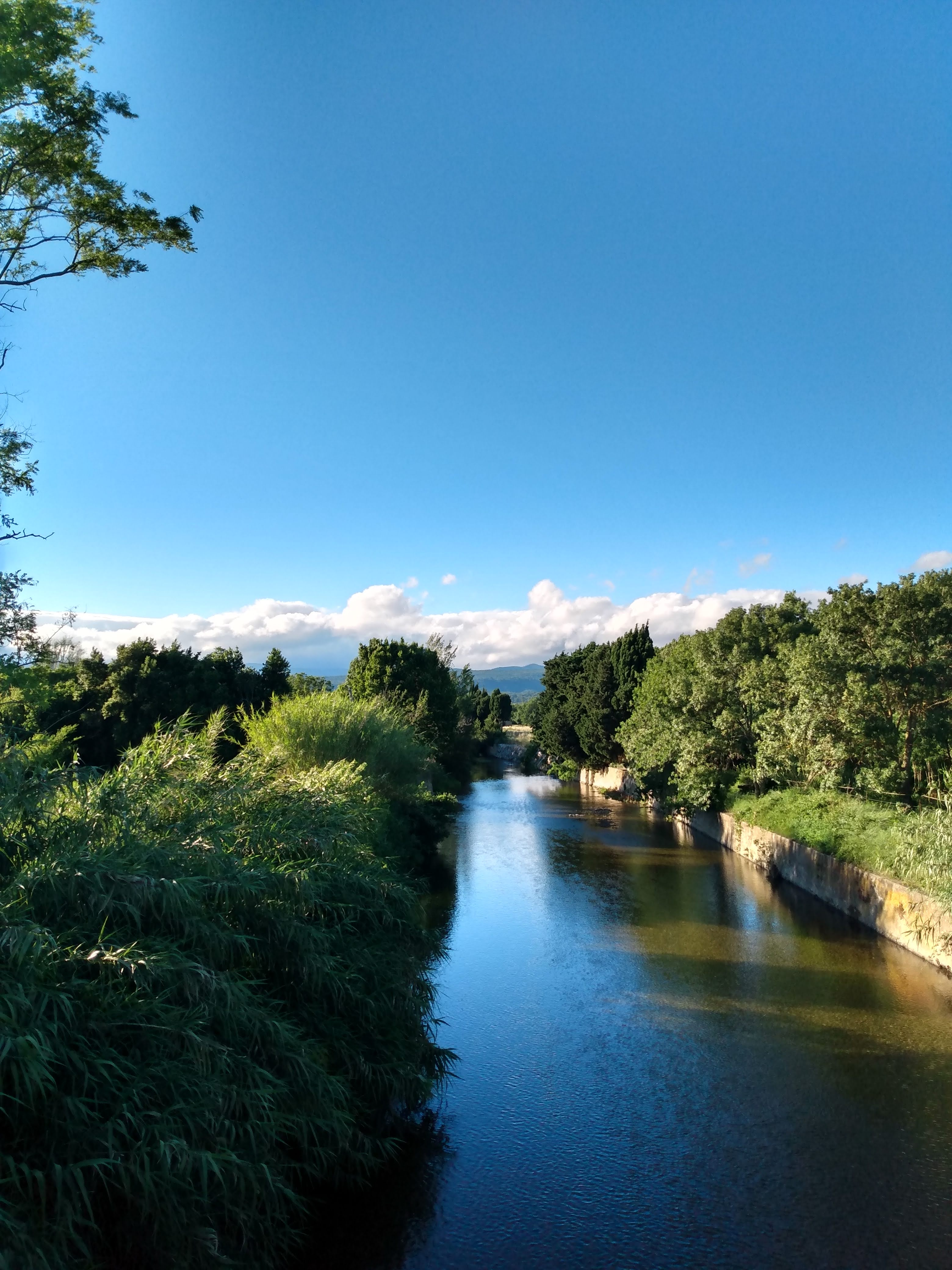
The river Argent-Double flows through the village

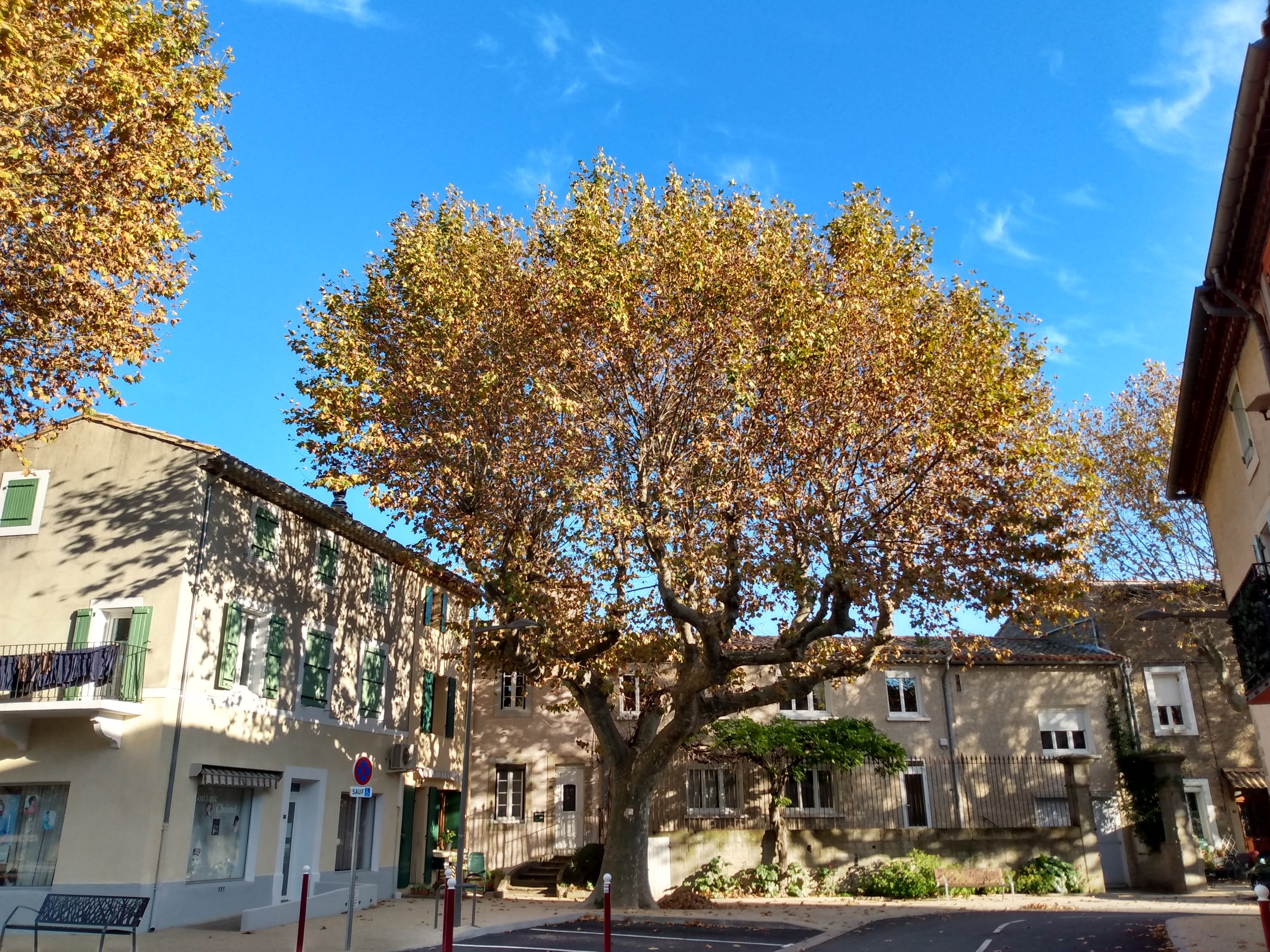
Peyriac's main square with its centenary plane trees

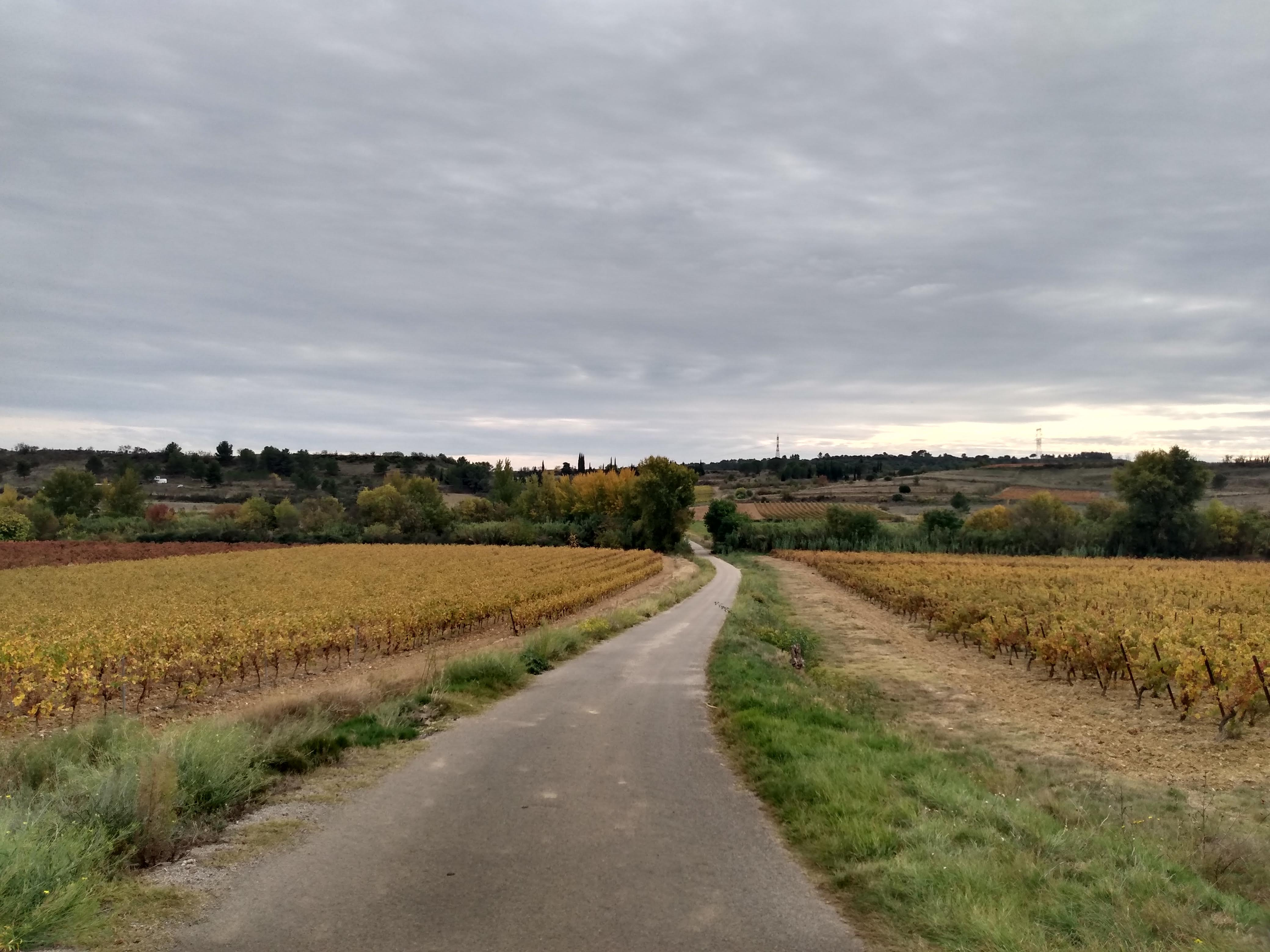
Peyriac is in the heart of the Languedoc wine region

== See also ==
- Communes of the Aude department
