= The Deserter (poem) =

Poem written by Winifred M. Letts

The Deserter is a British First World War poem, written in 1916 by Winifred M. Letts (1882–1972). It tells the story of a young British soldier who is shot for desertion. The poem shows the complex and often overlooked issue of soldiers deserting the military during war times and challenges the often glorified notions of heroism and sacrifice and confronts the grim reality of war. Letts utilizes a simple yet poignant language to describe the actions of the soldier that evokes sympathy for the soldier. It has been included in several anthologies of First World War poems. It is written in iambic tetrameter.
