= Pauline B. Barrington =

American poet (1876–1956)

Pauline B. Barrington (born Pauline V. Bucknor; July 11, 1876 – December 5, 1956) was an American writer recognized for her 1916 poem "Education", which protested American involvement in World War I. "Education" was included in the first anthology dedicated exclusively to women's poetry from World War I, Scars Upon My Heart (1981).

== Life ==
Barrington was born Pauline V. Bucknor in Philadelphia, Pennsylvania to Charles Bucknor, a cigar manufacturer, and Clara R. Bucknor (née Reaney). She married Charles Barrington in September 1901 in Pasadena, California. Thereafter, she lived in California and published under the name Pauline B. Barrington. The couple had two children. In Women's Poetry of the First World War, Nosheen Khan notes that Barrington worked as a secretary. She died in Los Angeles, California in 1956.

== Works ==
Although today recognized as a poet, Barrington began her writing career as a playwright. When a Woman is Poor, a one act play from 1914, was followed the next year by When the Young Birds Go, which received first place in the Los Angeles Drama League Manuscript Play Contest, June 1915. In 1915, Barrington published her first poems in the Los Angeles Graphic. According to a brief early biography, she contributed to The Masses and The Conservator. Two of her poems appeared in the influential literary magazine Poetry, edited by Harriet Monroe. She also served as a reviewer for The Lyric West: A Magazine of American Verse.

Barrington published over a dozen poems with the Los Angeles Graphic between 1915 and 1916. Literary historian Mike Chasar argues that the first quarter of the twentieth century was a time when "people in the United States were producing and consuming more verse than at any other time in history" through a culture of books, magazines, newspapers, and classroom readers. It followed that "A White Iris", one of Barrington's "garden poems", was promptly republished in anthologies such as Golden Songs of the Golden State (1917), The Melody of the Earth (1918), and an edition of the Bulletin of the Garden Club of America (1922).

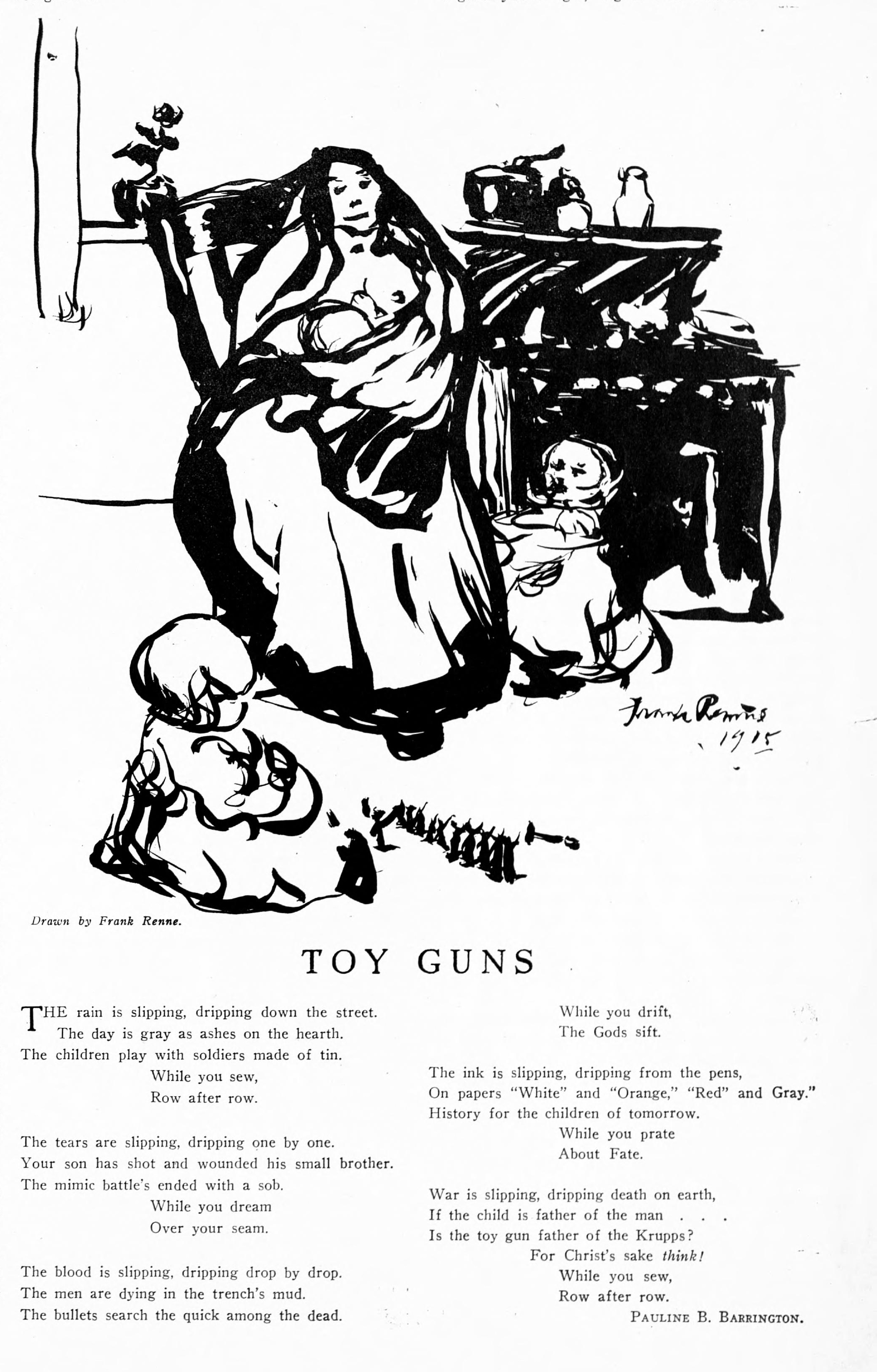
"Toy Guns" by Pauline B. Barrington, illustrated by Frank Renne. From The Masses (May 1916).

Today Barrington is known for her antiwar poem "Education". The poem was originally published with the title "Toy Guns" in the socialist monthly The Masses in May 1916. As Margaret Jones points out, "Long before the United States entered the war in 1917 (an event which was to lead to the closing down of the magazine, and the trial of its editors, under the Espionage Act), every issue [of The Masses] carried antiwar cartoons, reports from the European fronts, and pacifist poetry. A significant proportion of these antiwar gestures were the work of women". By 1918, the poem was retitled "Education" and included in Poems Written During the Great War, 1914-1918: An Anthology.

The final stanza of "Education" reads:

War is slipping, dripping death on earth,
If the child is father of the man . . .
Is the toy gun father of the Krupps?
For Christ’s sake think!
While you sew,
Row after row.

In her analysis of the poem, Elizabeth A. Marsland finds that Barrington "raises a question that is still a major concern, even in peacetime—the part played by mothers in promoting the acceptability of violence". Jane Dowson refers to the poem's "critique of women's collusion with militarism": "There are two competing discourses: the official and idealised depiction of the women at home and the underlying objection to the man made concept of military glory which was alien to them and which devastated their personal lives".

Barrington published a second anti-war poem, "The Orchid Hunter" in The Los Angeles Times in 1917. In it, Barrington adopts the voice of a soldier who has been "mutilated beyond recognition" in the Great War and subsequently hides himself from the world, seeking rare flora:

I was a year in the trenches
Among the tear and spatter
Of shrapnel.
Among headless men, twisted men, mad men
In masses,
Under the scream of shells
Blossoming overhead
Like flowers of flame in greenish light,
In a world of torture, pain and dread.

== Bibliography ==
=== Poetry ===
- "At the Symphony Concert", The Los Angeles Graphic, December 18, 1915.
- "A Fire Star", The Los Angeles Graphic, December 25, 1915.
- "Carnival", The Los Angeles Graphic, January 1, 1916.
- "Cubes and Cones", The Los Angeles Graphic, January 15, 1916.
- "Outside", The Los Angeles Graphic, January 29, 1916.
- "On Hearing an Etude by Bortkiewicz", The Los Angeles Graphic, February 5, 1916.
- "A Day of Trees", The Los Angeles Graphic, February 19, 1916.
- "The Casement Door", The Los Angeles Graphic, March 4, 1916.
- "Spring", The Los Angeles Graphic, March 18, 1916.
- "Impressions", The Los Angeles Graphic, April 8, 1916.
- "Toy Guns", The Masses, Vol. 8, no. 11, May 1916, p. 13.
- "Vignettes", The Los Angeles Graphic, May 27, 1916.
- "A White Iris", The Los Angeles Graphic, June 10, 1916.
- "Ice Skates", The Los Angeles Graphic, July 18, 1916.
- "But for You", The Los Angeles Graphic, September 30, 1916.
- "The Birthday of a King", Oakland Tribune, December 25, 1916.
- "The Orchid Hunter", The Los Angeles Times, October 30, 1917.
- "The Pomegranate Bush", Poetry, Vol. 12, no. 6 (1918), pp. 304-305.
- "Sunrise at Santa Barbara", Poetry, Vol. 12, no. 6 (1918), pp. 303-304.

=== Plays ===
When a Woman is Poor (1914)

When the Young Birds Go, a play in one act. Los Angeles: C.C. Parker, 1915. Available online at Internet Archive
