= Isabel C. Clarke =

British children's novelist (1869–1951)

Isabel Constance Clarke (1869 – 13 April 1951) was a British Catholic novelist and biographer. author of over fifty books. She considered the novel to be a "definite apostolate" for its ability to bring the Catholic faith to those who are ignorant of it. Catholic children's author Francis J. Finn called her the "greatest living Catholic novelist".

== Works ==
- The Castle of San Salvo
- Selma
- It Happened in Rome
- Strangers of Rome
- The Villab by the Sea
- Children of the Shadow
- Anna Nugent
- Viola Hudson
- The Light on the Lagoon
- The Lamp of Destiny
- A Case of Conscience
- Ursula Finch
- The Elstones
- Eunice
- Children of Eve
- The Deep Heart
- Fine Clay
- The Rest House
- Only Anne
- Average Cabins
- Carina
- The Potter's House
- Tressider's Sister
- Lady Trent's Daughter
- Whose Name is Legion
- Prisoner's Years
- The Secret Citadel
- By the Blue River

== See also ==
- List of biographers
- List of British writers
- List of children's literature writers
- List of women writers
