= Louis Barthas =

French infantry corporal during World War I (1879–1952)

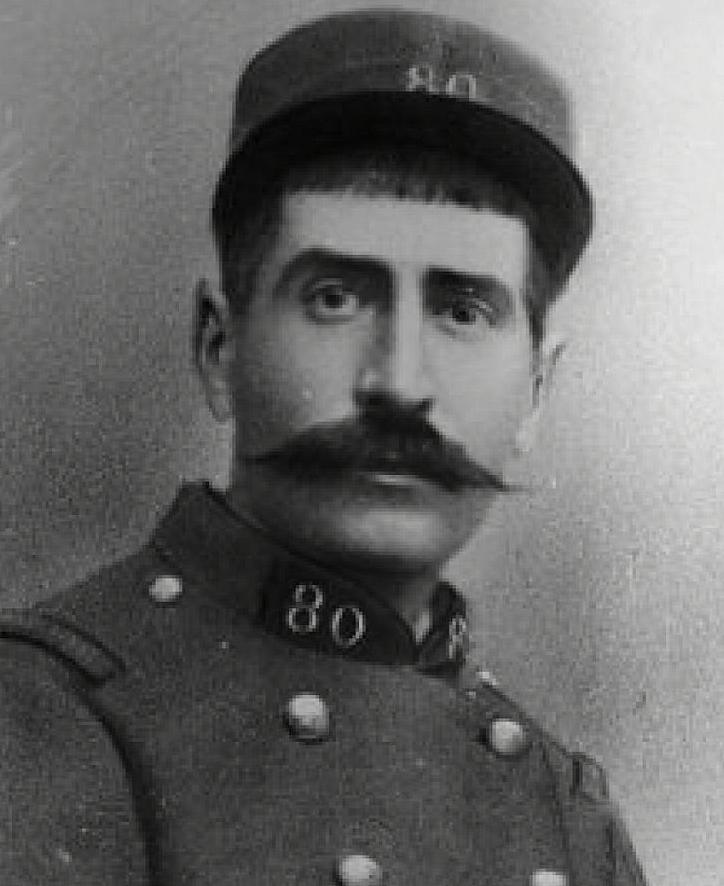
- Barthas in 1914
- Born: 14 July 1879; Homps, Aude, France
- Died: 4 May 1952 (aged 72); Peyriac-Minervois, France
- Military career
- Branch: French Army
- Years of service: 1914–1919
- Rank: Corporal
- Units: 280th Infantry Regiment; 296th Infantry Regiment; 248th Infantry Regiment
- Conflict: World War I

Louis Barthas (French pronunciation: [lwi baʁta]; 14 July 1879 – 4 May 1952) was a French infantry corporal who served on the Western Front of World War I for nearly the entire duration of conflict, stationed on the front lines for a significant amount of time. He was a politically active socialist, an anti-militarist and a professional barrelmaker.

Barthas extensively documented his wartime experiences. After the war, he set out to compile these into a series of notebooks, forming a single comprehensive manuscript. He did not think to have them published, and the notebooks were kept in the back of a drawer for the next couple of decades.

His grandson, a teacher at a secondary school in Carcassonne, consigned the notebooks to a colleague history teacher who used them in his curriculum. Word of mouth brought renewed attention to Barthas' manuscript, and in 1978, sixty years after the war, it was published as Poilu: the World War I notebooks of Corporal Louis Barthas, barrelmaker, 1914–1918.

== Early life ==
Louis Barthas was born on 14 July 1879—Bastille Day—in the town of Homps, Aude. His father, Jean, was a barrelmaker and his mother, Louise, was a seamstress.

At the outbreak of the First World War, Barthas was a barrelmaker in Peyriac-Minervois, a job he returned to after the Armistice of 11 November 1918. As a socialist activist, he participated in the creation of the union of agricultural workers and shared the peaceful ideas of Jean Jaurès.

== World War I ==
Barthas was mobilized to the 280th Infantry Regiment of Narbonne in August 1914, with the rank of corporal – a rank he held for the duration of the conflict. In December 1915, he joined the 296th Infantry Regiment. In November 1917, he joined the 248th Infantry Regiment.

For four years he fought in the most dangerous sectors of the front: Notre-Dame-de-Lorette, Verdun, the Somme, and the Chemin des Dames. He took part in the French Army mutinies of 1917. His wartime memoir seems to have begun as a diary, which over the years came to fill many volumes.

== Later life ==
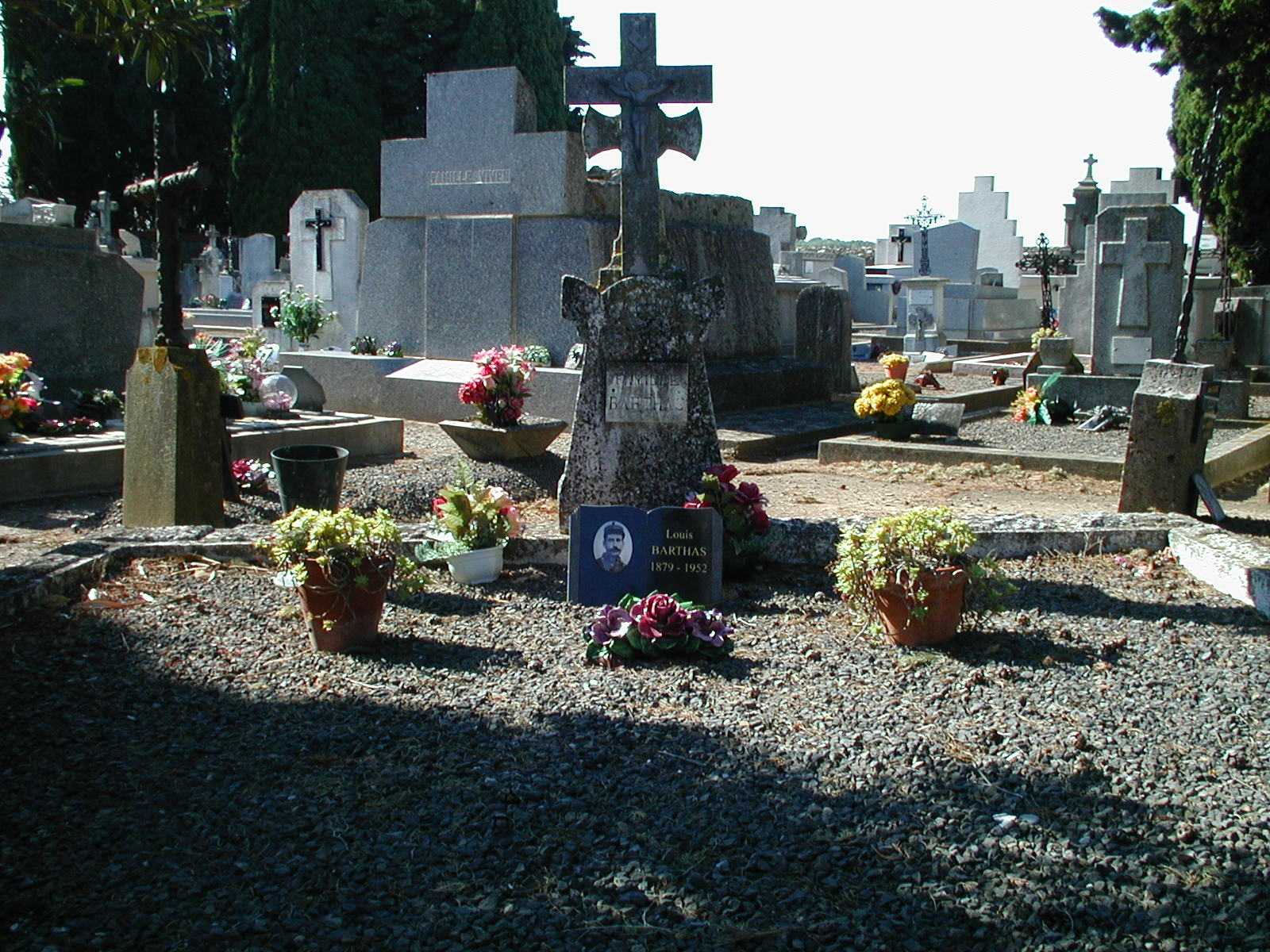
Barthas' grave in Peyriac-Minervois

Barthas was decommissioned in February 1919, and soon set out to assemble a comprehensive narrative of his wartime years. He transcribed his diaries and letters into 19 notebooks, pasting in picture postcards, illustrations, and maps clipped from newspapers and magazines.

He did not think to have them published, therefore the notebooks remained unpublished in the family armoire for more than sixty years. Eventually discovered by professor Rémy Cazals of the University of Toulouse, they were published in 1978.

The squad is like a little family, a center of affection where deep feelings prevail, of solidarity, mutual devotion, intimacy, and from which the officer and even the sergeant are excluded. To them, the soldier doesn't open up, is mistrustful, and any officer who will want to try to describe the strange life of the trenches, as I'm doing, will never have known, except by accident, the real sentiments, the true spirit, the clear language and the deepest thoughts of the soldier.

== Legacy ==
On a memorial to the fallen of World War I in Pontcharra-sur-Bréda in the Département Isère, a quote of Barthas' diary is engraved, reading:

Often I think of the great number of companions who fell at my side. I heard how they condemned this war and its perpetrators. I have seen their revolt against their portentous fate, against their murder. I, as a survivor, believe that their will has inspired me to fight till my last breath for the idea of peace and brotherhood among humanity. February 1919."
