= Lady Margaret Sackville =

English poet and children's author (1881–1963)

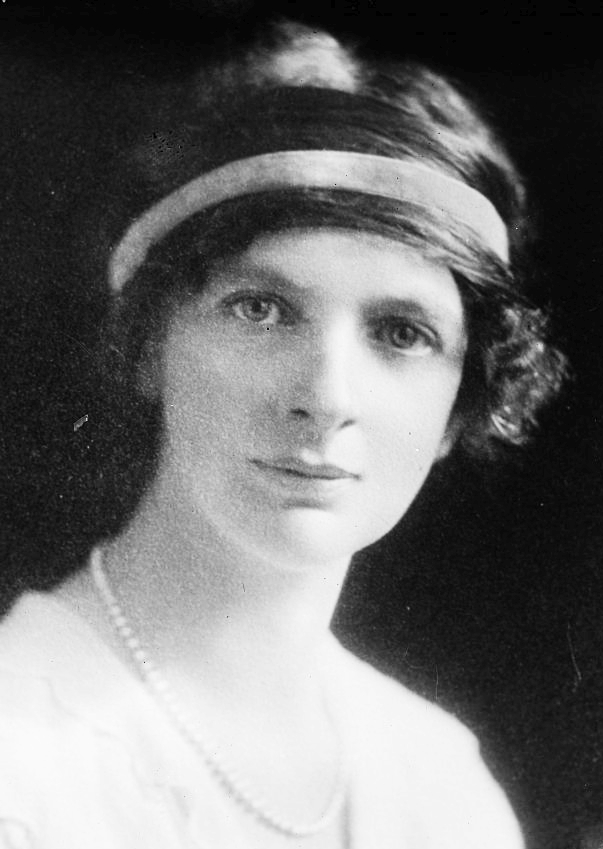
Lady Margaret Sackville

Lady Margaret Sackville (24 December 1881 – 18 April 1963) was an English poet and children's author.

Born at 60 Grosvenor Street, Mayfair, Sackville was the youngest child of Reginald Windsor Sackville, 7th Earl De La Warr. She was a second cousin of Vita Sackville-West.

== Poetry ==
She began to write poetry at an early age and when she was 16 became a protégée of Wilfrid Scawen Blunt. With his encouragement, she had her early poems published in periodicals such as The English Review, the Englishwoman's Review, Country Life, The Nation, The Spectator and the Pall Mall Gazette. She published her first book of poems, Floral Symphony, in 1900. In 1910, she edited A Book of Verse by Living Women. In her introduction, she noted that poetry was one of the few arts in which women were allowed to engage without opposition and made a direct connection between women's social freedom and the freedom of the imagination.

When the Poetry Society was formed in 1912, Sackville was made its first president. She had also been the first president of its predecessor, the Poetry Recital Society, formed in 1909. Joy Grant, in her biography of Harold Monro, writes that Sackville "spoke well and to the point at the inauguration, hoping that the Society would 'never become facile and "popular", to turn to a merely trivial gathering of persons amiably interested in the same ideal'". Her half-expressed fears were unfortunately fulfilled: "the direction in which the Society was heading soon became obvious—poetry was made an excuse for pleasant social exchanges, for irrelevant snobbery, for the disagreeable consequences of organised association."

== Personal life ==
She had a passionate 15-year love affair with Ramsay MacDonald, recorded in letters they wrote to each other between 1913 and 1929. MacDonald was a widower and repeatedly proposed to her, but she declined to be his wife. His biographer David Marquand speculated that, although social considerations were a factor in her refusal, the main reason was that they were of different religions. Sackville was Roman Catholic, while MacDonald was raised in the Presbyterian Church, later joining the Free Church of Scotland. Sackville never married.

== Peace movement ==
At the outbreak of World War I, she joined the anti-war Union of Democratic Control. In 1916 she published a collection of poems called The Pageant of War. It included the poem "Nostra Culpa", denouncing women who betrayed their sons by not speaking out against the war. Her sister-in-law, Muriel De La Warr, and her nephew, Herbrand Sackville, 9th Earl De La Warr, were also involved in the peace movement. Her brother, Gilbert Sackville, 8th Earl De La Warr, was killed during the conflict in 1915. The spare and angry strength of Sackville's war poems has attracted recent critical attention. Brian Murdoch notes the absence of overt patriotic elements in The Pageant of War and its memorialisation of all the dead: soldiers, non-combatants and refugees.

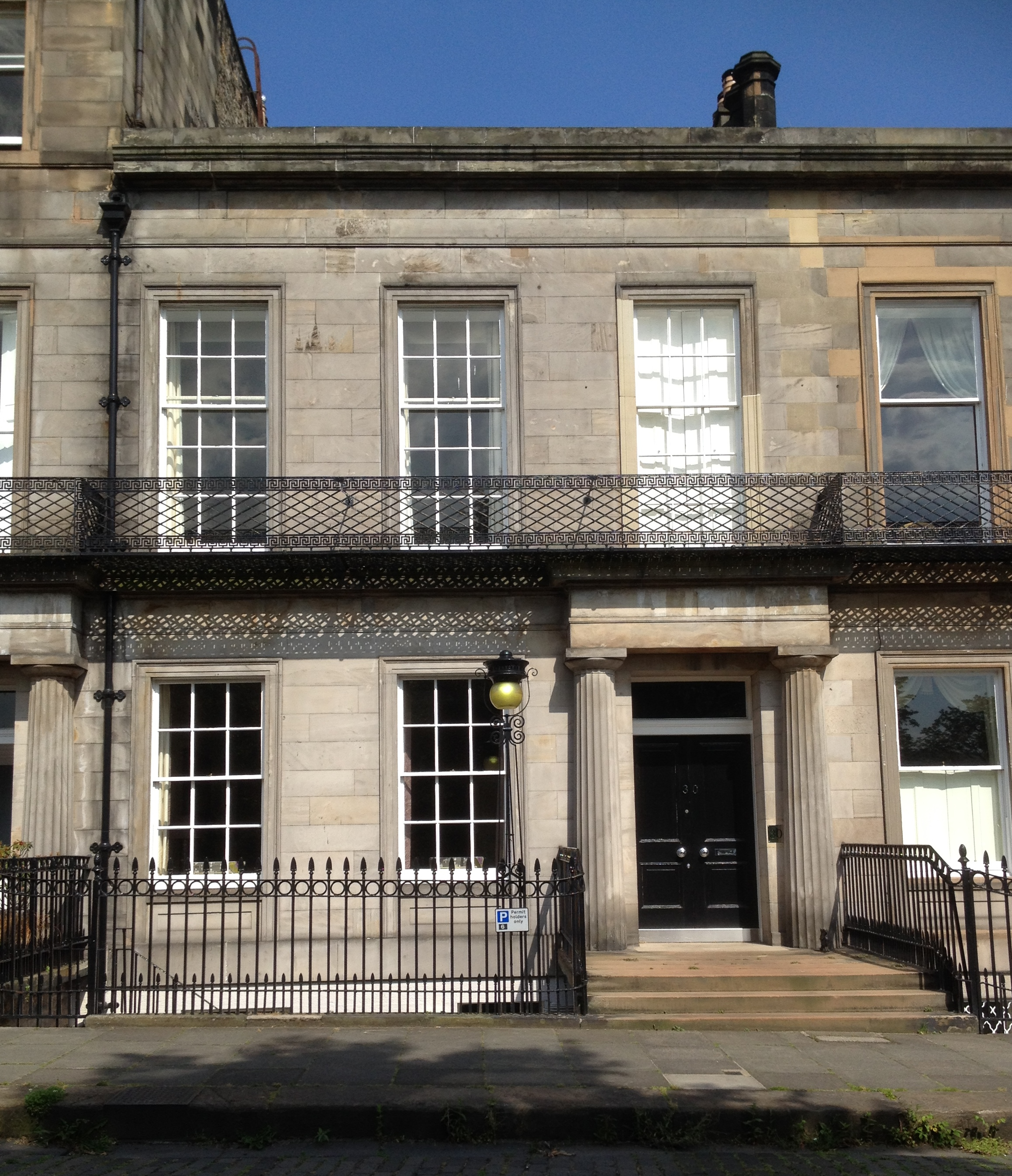
30 Regent Terrace, Edinburgh

== Later life ==
She spent much of her adult life in Midlothian and Edinburgh, where she became the first president of Scottish PEN and was elected a fellow of the Royal Society of Literature. She was a member of Marc-André Raffalovich's Whitehouse Terrace salon, where she met guests including Henry James, Compton Mackenzie and the artist Hubert Wellington. In 1922, she published A Masque of Edinburgh. This was performed at the Music Hall, George Street, Edinburgh, and depicted the history of Edinburgh in 11 scenes, from the Romans to a meeting between the poet Robert Burns and the writer Sir Walter Scott. Sackville lived at 30 Regent Terrace, Edinburgh, from 1930 to 1932.

In 1936, Sackville moved to Cheltenham, where she lived for the rest of her life. She died of a heart condition at Rokeby Nursing Home, Cheltenham, in 1963.

== Works ==
- Floral Symphony (1900)
- Poems (1901)
- A Hymn to Dionysus and Other Poems (1905)
- Hildris the Queen: A Play in Four Acts (1908)
- Fairy Tales for Old and Young (1909) with Ronald Campbell Macfie
- Bertrud and Other Dramatic Poems (1911)
- Jane Austen (1912)
- Lyrics (1912)
- More Fairy Tales for Old and Young (1912) with Ronald Campbell Macfie
- Short Poems (1913)
- Songs of Aphrodite (1913)
- The Career Briefly Set Forth of Mr. Percy Prendergast Who Told the Truth (1914)
- The Dream-Pedlar (1914)
- The Travelling Companions and Other Stories for Children (1915)
- The Pageant of War (1916)
- Three Plays for Pacifists (1919)
- Selected Poems (1919)
- Poems (1923)
- A Rhymed Sequence (1924)
- Three Fairy Plays (1925)
- Collected Dramas: Hidris, Bertrud (1926)
- Romantic Ballads (1927)
- Epitaphs (1926)
- Alicia and the Twilight: A Fantasy (1928)
- 100 Little Poems (1928)
- Twelve Little Poems (Red Lion Press 1931)
- Ariadne by the Sea (Red Lion Press, 1932)
- The Double House and Other Poems (1935)
- Mr. Horse's New Shoes (1936)
- Collected Poems of Lady Margaret Sackville (1939)
- A Poet Returns: Some Later Poems by Lady Margaret Sackville (1940) edited by Eva Dobell
- Tom Noodle's Kingdom (1941)
- Return to Song and Other Poems (1943)
- Paintings and Poems (1944)
- The Lyrical Woodland (1945)
- Country Scenes & Country Verse (1945)
- Miniatures (1947)
- Tree Music (1947)
- Quatrains and Other Poems (1960)
