= John William Cunliffe =

American author

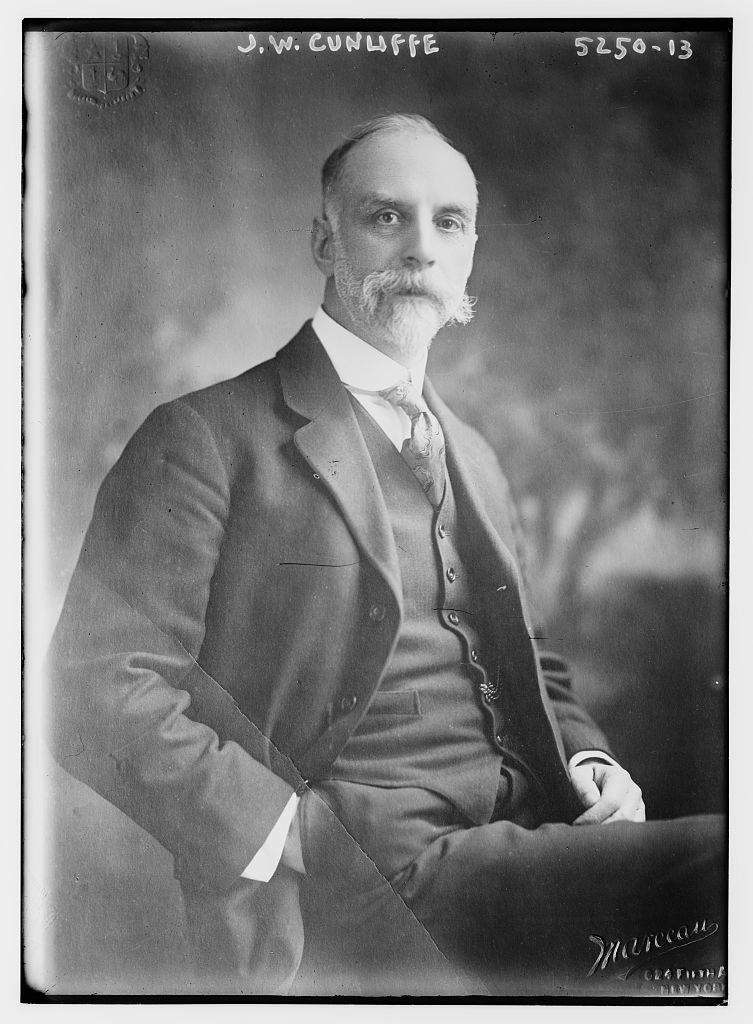
John William Cunliffe, 1920

John William Cunliffe (January 20, 1865 in Bolton, Lancashire- 1946) was a scholar and writer. He was a professor and English department chairman at Columbia University and also directed the school's journalism department.

== Career ==
Cunliffe was one of the contributing editors to the Library of the World's Best Literature. He coauthored an introduction to one of the revised, updated, and expanded editions. He was succeeded at Columbia by Carl W. Ackerman.

In March 1928, Columbia University Press announced a plan to publish a survey of literature chaired by Cunliffe. Columbia University has a collection of English department correspondence that includes Cunliffe.

== Bibliography ==
- Poems of the Great War by John William Cunliffe, The Macmillan Company, 1916 on behalf of the Belgian scholarship committee ISBN 9781103867745
- Leaders of the Victorian revolution (1934) by John William Cunliffe
- The influence of Seneca on Elizabethan tragedy (1893) by John William Cunliffe
- English literature during the last half-century (1919) by John William Cunliffe, a collection of essays
- English literature in the twentieth century (1933) by John William Cunliffe
- The complete works of George Gascoigne (1907) by George Gascoigne edited by John William Cunliffe
- Modern English playwrights; a short history of the English drama from 1825 (1927) by John William Cunliffe
- The Columbia University Course in Literature : Writers of Modern America, John W. Cunliffe (Chairman), Columbia University Press, New York, 1929
- Early English classical tragedies (1912) by John William Cunliffe
- Century readings for a course in English literature (1910) by John William Cunliffe
- Writing of Today : Models of Journalistic Prose by John William Cunliffe
- College English Composition (article)
