= Catherine W. Reilly =

British bibliographer and anthologist (1925–2005)

Catherine Winifred Reilly (4 April 1925 – 26 September 2005) was a British bibliographer and anthologist of women's poetry of the First and Second World Wars.

== Early life ==
Reilly was born in Stretford, Lancashire on 4 April 1925 and was the eldest of four children. She was taught to read by the age of three by her maternal grandmother. Two years before her father died, the family moved to Fallowfield where Reilly attended Hollies Convent FCJ School through a scholarship. The school was evacuated to Clitheroe in 1939 where Reilly and her sister Eileen lived in a country house on the River Ribble.

== Later life and career ==
After leaving school at the age of 16, she worked in public libraries in Greater Manchester, first in the city and then, from 1974, in Trafford.

She published her first book, English Poetry of the First World War:A Bibliography, in 1978. It took her four years to write and won her a fellowship of the Library Association. While researching her book, Reilly realised that out of the 2,225 British people she had identified that had published poetry about the war, a quarter of them were women despite the fact that the majority of poetry collections published after the war included no women. This led to her publishing her own collection of poems about the war, Scars Upon My Heart, in 1981.

Her second collection of poetry, called Chaos of the Night, was published in 1984 and like her first collection, only included works by women. She published English Poetry of the Second World War in 1986 which won her the Besterman Medal for Bibliography.

As well as poetry from the First and Second World Wars, Reilly also published bibliographies of poetry from the Victorian era. The first Late Victorian Poetry, 1880-1899 was published in 1994 and her second, Mid-Victorian Poetry, 1860-1879 was published in 2000. She began writing a third, Early Victorian Poetry, but it was not completed by the time of her death.

Reilly was diagnosed with cancer in 2001. She died on 26 September 2005.
