= Susan Kingsley Kent =

American historian

- Occupations: Professor and author

Academic background
- Education: Brandeis University

Academic work
- Discipline: British History
- Sub-discipline: Gender, culture, imperialism, and politics
- Institutions: University of Colorado Boulder
- Notable works: Making Peace: The Reconstruction of Gender in Interwar Britain; Sex and Suffrage in Britain, 1860-1914; Gender and Power in Britain, 1640-1990; The Women's War of 1929: Gender and Violence in Colonial Nigeria
- Website: www.colorado.edu/history/susan-kent

Susan Kingsley Kent is a professor emerita in Arts & Sciences at the University of Colorado Boulder and the Chair of the Department of Religious Studies. Her specialty is British History, with a focus on gender, culture, imperialism, and politics. Kent has authored Making Peace: The Reconstruction of Gender in Interwar Britain, as well as Sex and Suffrage in Britain, 1860-1914 and Gender and Power in Britain, 1640-1990 in addition to other books. She has also co-authored books, including The Women's War of 1929: Gender and Violence in Colonial Nigeria with Misty Bastian and Marc Matera.

== Biography ==
Kent completed her Ph.D. in comparative history at Brandeis University. She was a Susan B. Anthony postdoctoral fellow at the University of Rochester.

In 2015, she was named an Arts & Sciences Professor of Distinction at the University of Colorado Boulder.

=== Making Peace: The Reconstruction of Gender in Interwar Britain ===
Published in 1993, Making Peace: The Reconstruction of Gender in Interwar Britain is described by Birgitte Soland in Signs as "primarily concerned with understanding the remarkable shift in feminist thinking about women and gender that occurred in the course of the war", with the analysis focused "on the language with which women, the war, and the relationship between the sexes were described in the press, popular literature, feminist publications, government propaganda, and personal narratives during and after the war years." In Albion: A Quarterly Journal Concerned with British Studies, Susan D. Pennybacker writes, "Kent explores the transformation in the relationships between men and women, among women, and in the dominant feminist understandings of sexuality and gender. There is little Kent sees as static; most ideas about these issues appear to change between 1914 and 1918."

Ellen Ross writes in the Journal of Social History, "Kent views interwar feminists in dialogue with other kinds of culture- and policy-makers who helped to structure their logic and to limit their vocabulary. Making Peace thus surveys an enormous amount of material, from feminists' correspondence and newspapers to wartime memoirs of all kinds, and discusses it compellingly." In The English Historical Review, Janet Howarth writes, "The use of sexual images in war propaganda made conflict between the sexes, and sexual disorder, metaphors for war itself - hence the search for harmony between men and women became in its turn a metaphor for 'making peace.'"

=== The Women's War of 1929 ===
Kent co-authored The Women's War of 1929: Gender and Violence in Colonial Nigeria with Misty Bastian and Marc Matera, which was published in 2011. In African Studies Review, Saheed Aderinto writes that the book, which focuses on what was known as the "Aba Women's Riot", "provides one of the most detailed and multidimensional accounts of the circumstances that led to those events and their impact on the African-colonial encounter." According to Chima J. Korieh, writing for The American Historical Review, "the authors show the process through which Eastern Nigerian women infused indigenous ideology in resistance not just against British imperialism, but also against changing gender dynamics that increasingly identified women and the majority of ordinary people as subordinate to the British." In The International Journal of African Historical Studies, Andrew E. Barnes writes, "The thread that holds the work together is a shared concern to illustrate what the authors see as the oppression of the Igbo women as women."

== Selected works ==
- Sex and Suffrage in Britain, 1860-1914 (Routledge, 1987)
- Making Peace: The Reconstruction of Gender in Interwar Britain (Princeton University Press, 1993)
- Gender and Power in Britain, 1640-1990 (Routledge, 1999)
- Aftershocks: Politics and Trauma in Britain, 1918-1931 (MacMillan, 2009)
- The Women's War of 1929: Gender and Violence in Colonial Nigeria (MacMillan, 2011) (with Misty Bastian and Marc Matera)
- Gender and History (MacMillan, 2012)
- The Global Influenza Pandemic of 1918-1919 (Bedford/St. Martin's, 2012)
- Africans and Britons in the Age of Empires, 1660-1980 (Routledge, 2015) (with Myles Osborne)
- Queen Victoria: Gender and Empire (Oxford University Press, 2016)
- A New History of Britain: Four Nations and an Empire (Oxford University Press, 2016)
- The Global 1930s (Routledge, 2017) (with Marc Matera)
- Gender: A World History (Oxford University Press, 2020)
