= Anna Gordon Keown =

English author and poet

Anna Gordon Keown (1899–1957) was an English writer and poet.

She married writer and physician Philip Gosse (1879–1959), son of Edmund Gosse. When she died, her husband presented a large collection of literature to the University of Leeds in her memory, known as the Keown Collection (which is within the larger Brotherton Collection).

Among her works, perhaps the most famous is her book The Cat Who Saw God (1932), a comic drama about a cat who is possessed by the Roman Emperor Nero who decides to settle down with an old English spinster. In the week beginning 14 November 1932, Time listed it as one of their "Books of the Week", noting it as "amusing in the English manner.".

Another of her best-known works is a sonnet she wrote in her youth during World War I. Entitled Reported Missing, it is studied to this day in British schools as part of the OCR GCSE English literature syllabus.

== Reported Missing ==
My thought shall never be that you are dead:
Who laughed so lately in this quiet place.
The dear and deep-eyed humour of that face
Held something ever-living, in Death's stead.
Scornful I hear the flat things they have said
And all their piteous platitudes of pain.
I laugh! I laugh! -- For you will come again -
This heart would never beat if you were dead.
The world's adrowse in twilight hushfulness,
There's purple lilac in your little room,
And somewhere out beyond the evening gloom
Small boys are culling summer watercress.
Of these familiar things I have no dread
Being so very sure you are not dead.
