= Jessie Pope =

British poet, writer, and journalist (1868-1941)

- Born: 18 March 1868; Leicester, Leicestershire, England
- Died: 14 December 1941 (aged 73); Devon, England
- Writing career
- Period: First World War
- Genre: War poem

Jessie Pope (18 March 1868 – 14 December 1941) was an English poet, writer and journalist, who remains best known for her patriotic, motivational poems published during World War I. Wilfred Owen wrote his 1917 poem Dulce et Decorum est to Pope, whose literary reputation has faded into relative obscurity as those of war poets such as Owen and Siegfried Sassoon have grown.

== Early career ==
Born in Leicester, she was educated at North London Collegiate School. She was a regular contributor to Punch, The Daily Mail and The Daily Express, also writing for Vanity Fair, Pall Mall Magazine and The Windsor Magazine.

=== Prose editor ===
A lesser-known literary contribution was Pope's discovery of Robert Tressell's novel The Ragged Trousered Philanthropists, when his daughter mentioned the manuscript to her after his death. Pope recommended it to her publisher, who commissioned her to abridge it before publication. The result was a standard working-class tragedy that bowdlerized the novel's original socialist political content.

=== Verse ===
Other works include Water Pellets (1907), an anthology of humorous verse. She also wrote verses for children's books, such as The Cat Scouts (Blackie, 1912) and the following elegy to her friend, Bertram Fletcher Robinson (published in the Daily Express on Saturday 26 January 1907):

Good Bye, kind heart; our benisons preceding,
Shall shield your passing to the other side.
The praise of your friends shall do your pleading
In love and gratitude and tender pride.
To you gay humorist and polished writer,
We will not speak of tears or startled pain.
You made our London merrier and brighter,
God bless you, then, until we meet again!

== War poetry ==
Pope's war poetry was originally published in The Daily Mail; it encouraged enlistment and the handing of a white feather to youths who would not join the colours. Nowadays, this poetry is considered to be jingoistic, consisting of simple rhythms and rhyme schemes, with extensive use of rhetorical questions to persuade (and often pressure) young men to join the war. This extract from Who's for the Game? is typical in style:

Who’s for the game, the biggest that’s played,
The red crashing game of a fight?
Who’ll grip and tackle the job unafraid?
And who thinks he’d rather sit tight?

Other poems, such as The Call (1915) – "Who’s for the trench – Are you, my laddie?" – expressed similar sentiments. Pope was widely published during the war, apart from newspaper publication producing three volumes: Jessie Pope's War Poems (1915), More War Poems (1915) and Simple Rhymes for Stirring Times (1916).

=== Criticism ===
Her treatment of the subject is markedly in stark contrast to the anti-war stance of soldier poets such as Wilfred Owen and Siegfried Sassoon. Many of these men found her work distasteful, Owen in particular. His poem Dulce et Decorum Est was a direct response to her writing, originally dedicated "To Jessie Pope etc.". A later draft amended this as "To a certain Poetess", later being removed completely to turn the poem into a general reproach on anyone sympathetic to the war.

Pope is prominently remembered first for her pro-war poetry in World War One, but also as a representative of homefront female propagandists such as Mrs Humphry Ward, May Wedderburn Cannan, Emma Orczy, and entertainers such as Vesta Tilley. In particular, the poem "War Girls", similar in structure to her pro-war poetry, states how "No longer caged and penned up/They're going to keep their end up/Until the khaki soldier boys come marching back". Though largely unknown at the time, the War poets like Nichols, Sassoon and Owen, as well as later writers such as Edmund Blunden, Robert Graves, and Richard Aldington, have come to define the experience of the First World War.

=== Reappraisal ===
Pope's work is today often presented in schools and anthologies as a counterpoint to the work of the War Poets, a comparison by which her pro-war work suffers both technically and politically. Some writers have attempted a partial re-appraisal of her work as an early pioneer of English women in the workforce, while still critical of both the content and artistic merit of her war poetry. Reminded that Pope was primarily a humourist and writer of light verse, her success in publishing and journalism during the pre-war era, when she was described as the "foremost woman humourist" of her day, has been overshadowed by her propagandistic war poems. Her verse has been mined for sympathetic portrayals of the poor and powerless, of women urged to be strong and self-reliant. Her portrayal of the Suffragettes in a pair of counterpointed 1909 poems makes a case both for and against their actions.

== Later life ==
After the war, Pope continued to write, penning a short novel, poems—many of which continued to reflect upon the war and its aftermath—and books for children. She married a widower bank manager in 1929, when she was 61, and moved from London to Fritton, near Great Yarmouth. She died in December 1941 in Devon.
