= List of poems by Wilfred Owen =

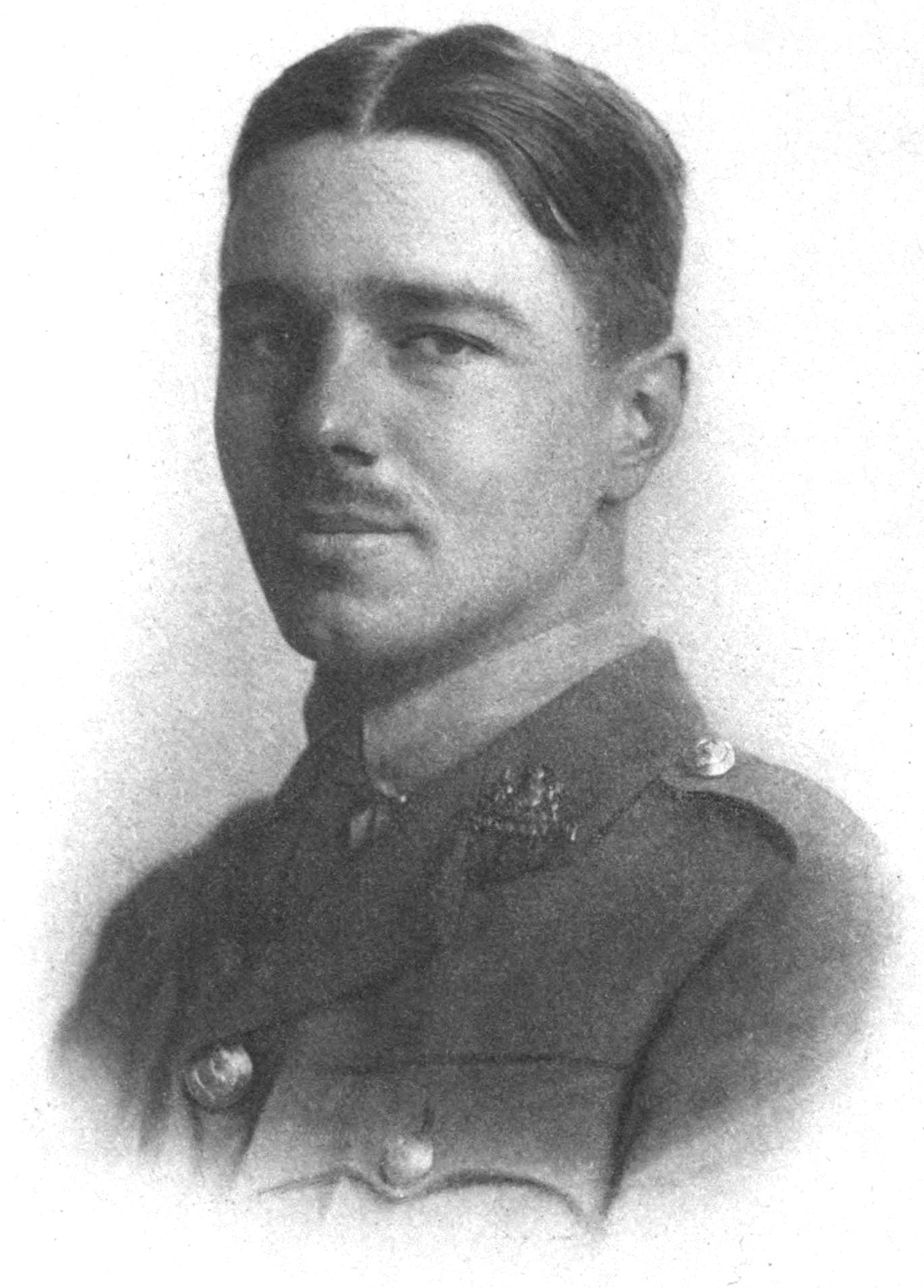
Wilfred Owen

This is a list of poems by Wilfred Owen.

- "1914"
- "Anthem for Doomed Youth"
- "Apologia Pro Poemate Meo"
- "Arms and the Boy"
- "As Bronze may be much Beautified"
- "Asleep"
- "At a Calvary near the Ancre"
- "Beauty"
- "But I Was Looking at the Permanent Stars"
- "The Calls"
- "The Chances"
- "Conscious"
- "Cramped in that Funnelled Hole"
- "The Dead-Beat"
- "Disabled"
- "Dulce et Decorum Est"
- "Elegy in April and September"
- "The End"
- "Exposure"
- "Futility"
- "Greater Love"
- "Happiness"
- "Has Your Soul Sipped?"
- "Hospital Barge"
- "How to Smile"
- "I Saw His Round Mouth's Crimson"
- "Insensibility"
- "Inspection"
- "The Kind Ghosts"
- "The Last Laugh"
- "Le Christianisme"
- "The Letter"
- "Mental Cases"
- "Miners"
- "Music"
- "A New Heaven"
- "The Next War"
- "The Parable of the Old Man and the Young"
- "The Roads Also"
- "S. I. W."
- "Schoolmistress"
- "The Send-off"
- "The Sentry"
- "The Show"
- "Six O'Clock in Princes Street"
- "Smile, Smile, Smile"
- "Soldier's Dream"
- "Sonnet on Seeing a Piece of Our Heavy Artillery Brought into Action"
- "Spells and Incantations"
- "Spring Offensive"
- "Strange Meeting"
- "A Terre"
- "Training"
- "Uriconium An Ode"
- "Wild with All Regrets"
- "With an Identity Disc"
- "The Wrestlers"
