= Poems (Wilfred Owen) =

1920 book by Wilfred Owen

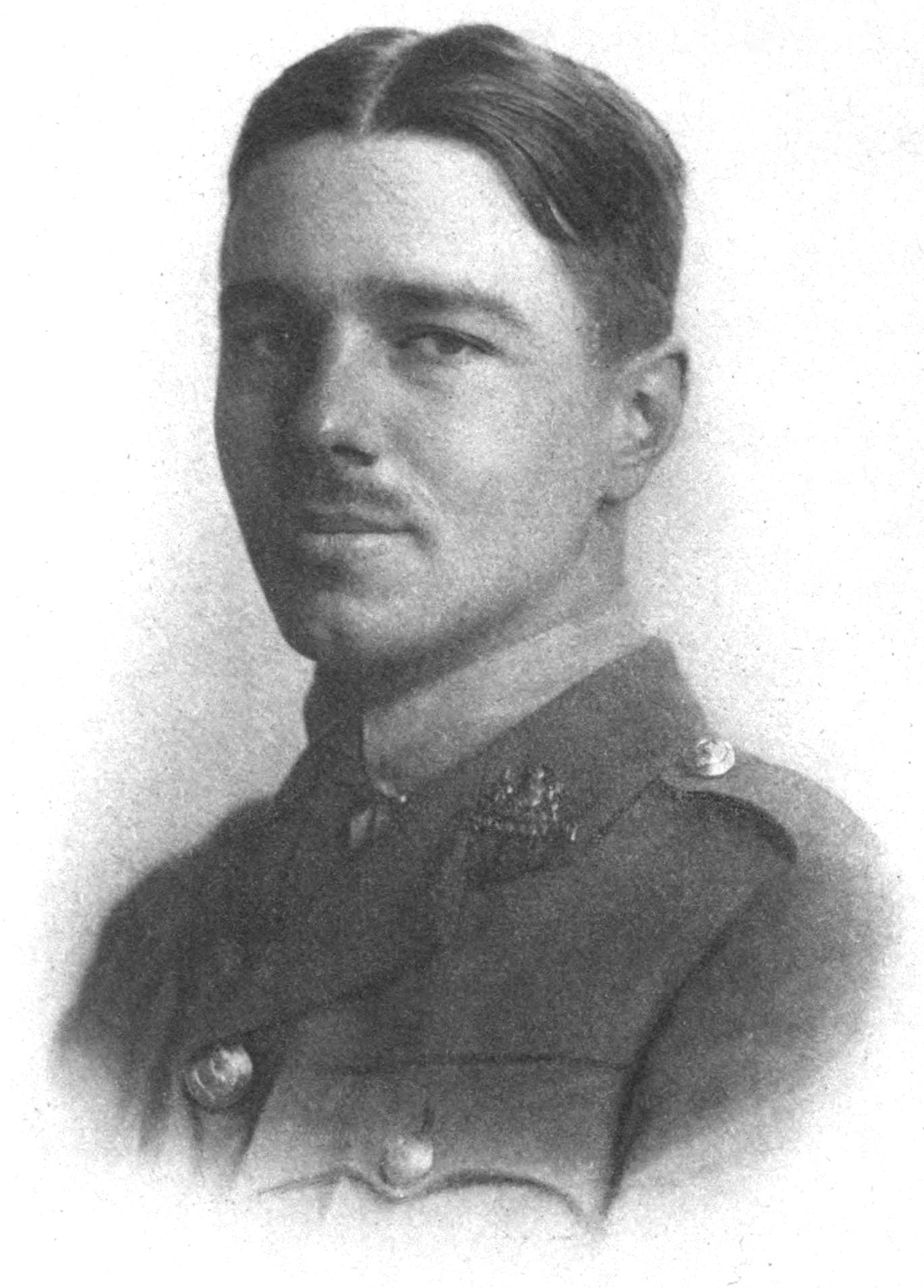
Plate of Wilfred Owen from Poems

Page from Poems by Wilfred Owen published posthumously in 1920. Wikisource has the original text of "Dulce et Decorum est"

Poems was a quarto volume of poetry by Wilfred Owen published posthumously by Chatto and Windus in 1920. Owen had been killed on 4 November 1918. It has been described as "perhaps the finest volume of anti-war poetry to emerge from the War".

The published volume included a sepia-toned photograph of the author in military uniform. It was edited by Owen's friend Siegfried Sassoon, with assistance from Edith Sitwell. Sassoon also wrote an introduction, including the words "The poems printed in this book need no preliminary introduction … All that was strongest in Wilfred Owen survives in his poems". The preface was found, in an unfinished condition, among Wilfred Owen's papers.

The slim book was sold for six shillings. It included 23 poems, including some of his most famous work, such as including "Anthem for Doomed Youth" and "Dulce et Decorum Est". Only five of his poems had been published before his death, three in The Nation, and two in The Hydra. Seven were published by the Sitwells in 1919, in their annual anthology Wheels.

Owen's reputation as a war poet was quickly established immediately after the end of the war. A further 19 poems were added in an expanded second edition, The Poems of Wilfred Owen published by Edmund Blunden in 1931, and the total reached 80 (together with other fragments) in the collected poems published by Cecil Day Lewis in 1963.

A first edition copy of Poems was sold by Bonhams in 2015 for £6,250.

== Poems ==
The volume included the following poems, listed in the order they were included in the volume:

- "Strange Meeting"
- "Greater Love"
- "Apologia Pro Poemate Meo"
- "The Show"
- "Mental Cases"
- "Parable of the Old Men and the Young"
- "Arms and the Boy"
- "Anthem for Doomed Youth"
- "The Send-off"
- "Insensibility"
- "Dulce et Decorum Est"
- "The Sentry"
- "The Dead-Beat"
- "Exposure"
- "Spring Offensive"
- "The Chances"
- "S. I. W."
- "Futility"
- "Smile, Smile, Smile"
- "Conscious"
- "A Terre"
- "Wild With All Regrets"
- "Disabled"
