= Strange (Wet Wet Wet song) =

1997 single by Wet Wet Wet

Single by Wet Wet Wet

from the album 10
- B-side: "Theme from Grand Prix"
- Released: 2 June 1997
- Recorded: September–October 1996
- Studio: Sarm Hook End Manor (Checkendon, England)
- Length: 3:46
- Label: The Precious Organisation; Mercury
- Songwriters: Graeme Clark; Tommy Cunningham; Neil Mitchell; Marti Pellow
- Producers: Graeme Clark; Graeme Duffin

Wet Wet Wet singles chronology
"If I Never See You Again" (1997)	"Strange" (1997)	"Yesterday" / "Maybe I'm in Love" (1997)

Music video
- "Strange" on YouTube

"Strange" is a song by Scottish band Wet Wet Wet, released as the second single from their fifth studio album, 10 (1997). It was released on 2 June 1997, charting at number 13 on the UK Singles Chart and becoming the group's 19th top-20 hit in the UK. Marti Pellow recorded his own version of the song for inclusion on his 2002 album, Marti Pellow Sings the Hits of Wet Wet Wet & Smile.

== Track listings ==
UK CD1

1. "Strange" (radio edit)
2. "Lip Service" (live at Hook End)
3. "Don't Want to Forgive Me Now" (live at Wembley)
4. "Strange" (live at Hook End)

UK CD2

1. "Strange" (radio edit)
2. "If I Never See You Again" (live at Hook End)
3. "Theme from Grand Prix"
4. "Strange" (LP version)

UK cassette and European CD single

1. "Strange" (radio edit)
2. "Don't Want to Forgive Me Now" (live at Wembley)

== Credits and personnel ==
Credits are lifted from the UK CD1 liner notes and the 10 booklet.

Studio

- Recorded between September and October 1996 at Sarm Hook End Manor (Checkendon, England)

Personnel

- Graeme Clark – writing, production
- Tommy Cunningham – writing
- Neil Mitchell – writing
- Marti Pellow – writing
- Graeme Duffin – all guitars, production
- Luís Jardim – percussion
- Paul Spong – trumpet
- Steve Sidwell – trumpet
- Mark Nightingale – trombone
- Jamie Talbot – saxophone
- Axel Kroell – co-production
- Bob Clearmountain – mixing
- Ian Morrow – programming
- Paul Wright – engineering
- Tim Wills – engineering assistance

== Charts ==
Chart (1997)	Peak position
Belgium (Ultratip Bubbling Under Flanders)	10
Europe (Eurochart Hot 100)	76
Germany (GfK)	95
Netherlands (Single Top 100)	83
Scotland Singles (OCC)	5
UK Singles (OCC)	13
