= Julia Says =

1995 single by Wet Wet Wet

Single by Wet Wet Wet

from the album Picture This
- B-side: "It's Now or Never" (live); "I Don't Want to Know"; "Dixie"
- Released: 13 March 1995
- Recorded: May 1993–October 1994
- Studio: Chipping Norton (Chipping Norton, England); The Brill Building (Glasgow, Scotland); Windmill Lane (Dublin, Ireland)
- Length: 4:06
- Label: The Precious Organisation; Mercury
- Songwriters: Graeme Clark; Tommy Cunningham; Neil Mitchell; Marti Pellow
- Producers: Graeme Clark; Graeme Duffin; Wet Wet Wet

Wet Wet Wet singles chronology
"Love Is All Around" (1994)	"Julia Says" (1995)	"Don't Want to Forgive Me Now" (1995)

Music video
- "Julia Says" on YouTube

"Julia Says" is a song by Scottish band Wet Wet Wet, released as the second single from their sixth studio album, Picture This (1995). It was released on 13 March 1995, by The Precious Organisation and Mercury Records, and peaked at number three on the UK Singles Chart. Outside the UK, "Julia Says" reached number three in Ireland and number eight in Iceland but experienced limited success elsewhere. Band member Marti Pellow recorded his own version of the song for inclusion on his 2002 album Marti Pellow Sings the Hits of Wet Wet Wet & Smile.

== Track listings ==
- UK CD1
1. "Julia Says"
2. "It's Now or Never" (live from the Elvis Tribute Concert)
3. "I Don't Want to Know"
4. "Julia Says" (synth string version)
- UK CD2
1. "Julia Says"
2. "It's Now or Never" (live from the Elvis Tribute Concert)
3. "Dixie"
4. "Julia Says" (live from Tarlair Music Festival)
- UK 7-inch and cassette single
1. "Julia Says"
2. "It's Now or Never" (live from the Elvis Tribute Concert)

== Credits and personnel ==
Credits are adapted from the UK CD1 liner notes and the Picture This album booklet.

Studios

- Recorded between May 1993 and October 1994 at Chipping Norton (Chipping Norton, England), The Brill Building (Glasgow, Scotland), and Windmill Lane (Dublin, Ireland)

Personnel

- Wet Wet Wet – production, arrangement
  - Graeme Clark – writing, fretless bass, assorted basses, production
  - Tommy Cunningham – writing, drums, percussion
  - Neil Mitchell – writing, keyboards, piano
  - Marti Pellow – writing, vocals
- Fiachra Trench – orchestration
- Paul Spong – trumpet
- Neil Sidwell – trombone
- Graeme Duffin – all guitars, production
- Bob Clearmountain – mixing
- Ian Morrow – programming
- Simon Vinestock – engineering
- Andrew Boland – string engineering

== Charts ==
=== Weekly charts ===
Weekly chart performance for "Julia Says"
Chart (1995)	Peak position
Australia (ARIA)	38
Austria (Ö3 Austria Top 40)	19
Belgium (Ultratop 50 Flanders)	32
Belgium (Ultratop 50 Wallonia)	27
Europe (Eurochart Hot 100)	20
Europe (European Hit Radio)	2
Germany (GfK)	42
Iceland (Íslenski Listinn Topp 40)	8
Ireland (IRMA)	3
Israel (Israeli Singles Chart)	12
Italy Airplay (Music & Media)	4
Netherlands (Dutch Top 40)	33
Netherlands (Single Top 100)	22
Norway (VG-lista)	10
Scottish Singles Sales (Official Charts)	2
UK Singles (Official Charts)	3
UK Airplay (Music Week)	2

=== Year-end charts ===
Year-end chart performance for "Julia Says"
Chart (1995)	Position
Europe (European Hit Radio)	12
Iceland (Íslenski Listinn Topp 40)	88
UK Singles (OCC)	62
UK Airplay (Music Week)	26

== Certifications ==
Certifications and sales for "Julia Says"
Region	Certification	Certified units/sales
United Kingdom (BPI)	Silver	200,000^{^}
^{^} Shipments figures based on certification alone.

== Release history ==
Release dates and formats for "Julia Says"
Region	Date	Format(s)	Label(s)	Ref.
United Kingdom	13 March 1995	7-inch vinyl; CD; cassette	The Precious Organisation; Mercury	
Australia	10 April 1995	CD; cassette	The Precious Organisation; Mercury	
Japan	10 April 1995	Mini-CD	The Precious Organisation; Mercury	
