= Caden's Song (My First Christmas) =

Single by David Beggan & Union State
- Released: December 9, 2012
- Recorded: 2012
- Genre: Pop
- Length: 4:33
- Label: EmuBands

"Caden's Song (My First Christmas)" is a song performed by David Beggan & Union State released as a digital download on December 9, 2012. The song was recorded in memory of Caden Beggan, who was diagnosed with meningococcal septicaemia, a type of blood poisoning caused by the same kind of bacteria found in the most common form of bacterial meningitis. The song has peaked to number 78 on the UK Singles Chart, number 19 on the Scottish Singles Charts and number 6 on the UK Indie Chart.

== Background ==
The song was recorded by Caden Beggan's father and Union State, a Scottish band which comprises close family and friends including Caden's aunt, JJ Gilmour (formerly of The Silencers), Graeme Duffin (guitarist with Wet Wet Wet) and David Lyon. David Beggan said: "Angela, Declan and Ethan and I are in mourning for Caden and it has been a really difficult time. We miss him more than we can say. We wanted to say thank you to Yorkhill Hospital and all of the medical teams there especially the Blue Angels who were so compassionate to Caden and ourselves. The purpose of the song is to raise money for the hospital and to leave a memorial for Caden and his struggle. We have been so grateful for all of the support and prayers offered on our behalf so far and want to wish everyone who has supported us a happy Christmas and a peaceful new year." JJ Gilmour said: "It was an honour to be asked to sing on the track. Caden’s death was a real tragedy but his fight inspired so many all across the world. I’d encourage everyone to buy the single. Everything’s going to Yorkhill and it’ll make a real difference."

== Track listing ==
Digital download
No.	Title	Length
1.	"Caden's Song (My First Christmas)"	4:33

== Chart performance ==
On December 16, 2012, the song entered the UK Singles Chart at number 78, number 19 on the Scottish Singles Charts and number 6 on the UK Indie Chart.

=== Charts ===
Chart (2012)	Peak position
Scotland Singles (OCC)	19
UK Indie (OCC)	6
UK Singles (Official Charts Company)	78

== Release history ==
Region	Date	Format	Label
United Kingdom	December 9, 2012	Digital download	EmuBands
