= Bullets and Daffodils =

Musical about Wilfred Owen

- The Wilfred Owen Story
- The principal cast with Dean Johnson at the Jermyn Street Theatre in London's West End.
- Music: Dean Johnson
- Lyrics: Wilfred Owen, Dean Johnson
- Book: Dean Johnson
- Productions: Birkenhead; 2010 Birkenhead Central Library; West End; 2012 Jermyn Street Theatre

Bullets and Daffodils is a musical about the life of the war poet Wilfred Owen, created by musician and composer Dean Johnson and directed by Dean Sullivan. The musical is based on Owen's poems set to music by Johnson, with the addition of new songs written by Johnson to help narrate the story of Owen's life.

== Performances ==
Johnson attended the Birkenhead Institute as Owen had done previously and had become influenced by his poetry during his teenage years. The first performance of the musical was in 2010 at the Birkenhead Central Library, and subsequently moved to the Lyceum Theatre in Port Sunlight, Wirral, narrated by Sullivan.

The musical moved to the Forum Theatre in Chester in March 2012, including contributions from John Gorman and David Gilmour.

On 9 June 2012, a preview of the West End's performance took place at Fort Perch Rock in New Brighton, featuring Chloe Torpey as Susan Owen, Charlie Griffiths, Phil Gwilliam and Charlotte Roberts. Danny Morris made a special guest appearance playing the part of Wilfred Owen.

The London première of the musical occurred on 29 July 2012 in the Jermyn Street Theatre, London, directed by Illy Hill and featuring Christopher Timothy and Wet Wet Wet's Graeme Clark.

A UK tour based around places that Wilfred Owen visited or stayed in during his lifetime was organised for Autumn 2012 with dates in Blackpool, Stratford upon Avon, Dunsden, Oswestry, Heswall, Nelson and Ripon. In October, the musical was performed at Dunsden Green, Oxfordshire, where Owen lived from September 1911 to February 1913.

== Reception ==
Time Out described the musical as "Bizarre and intriguing, in equal parts."
