= New Celeste =

Scottish band

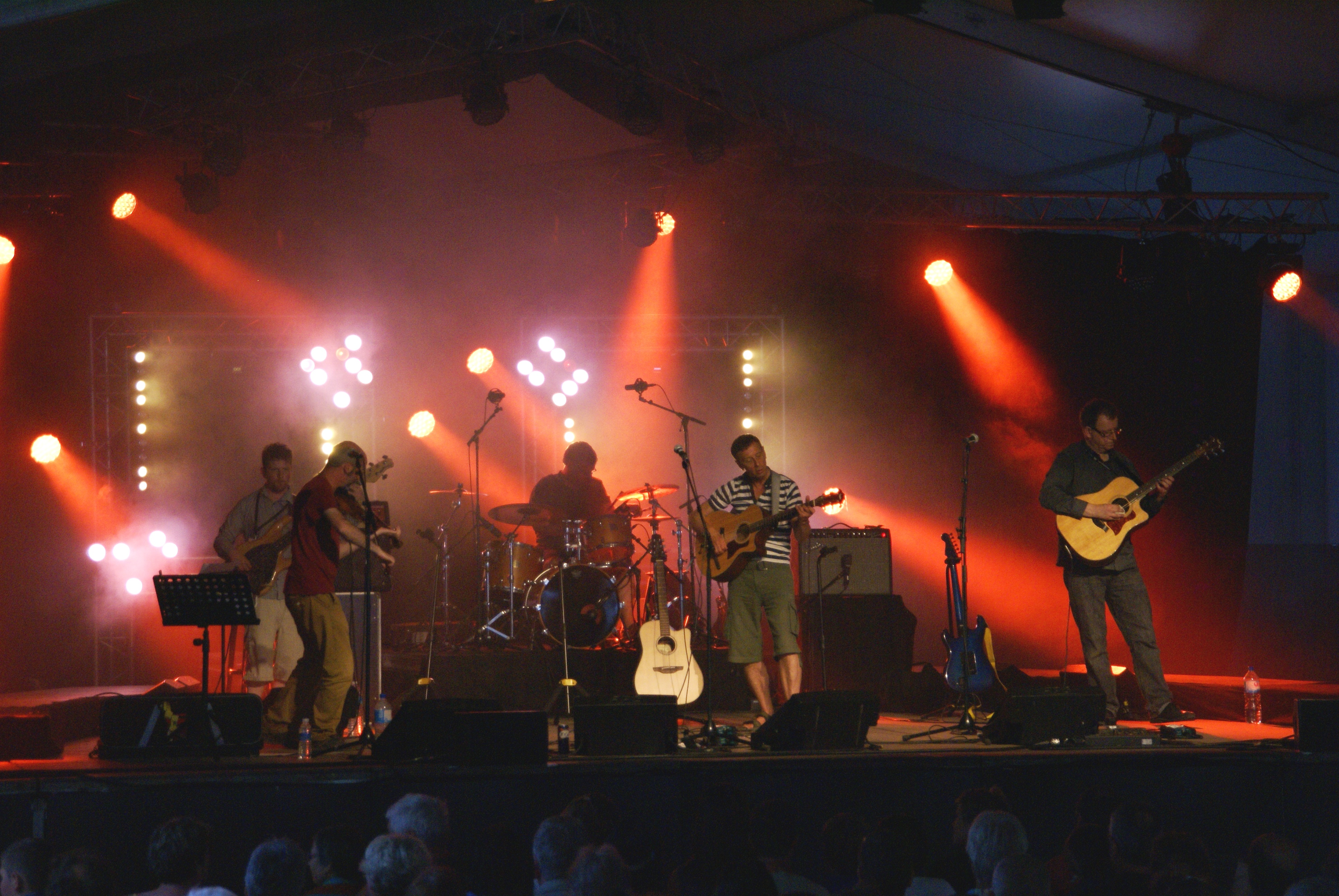
- New Celeste in 2013

Background information
- Origin: Glasgow, Scotland
- Genre: Folk rock
- Years active: 1975–present
- Labels: Universe, Hansa, Hexagone, Lismore, Iona, Park
- Members: Iain Fergus; Steve Reid; Gavin Marwick; Jerry Soffe; Max Saidi
- Past members: Jim Yule; Marysia Lessnau; Stewart Smith; Tom Honeyman; Graeme Duffin; Nigel Clark; Ronnie Gerrard; Rod Dorothy; Iain Bayne; Iain Aitken; Steve Donnelly; Joe O'Donnell; Neil Campbell; Jack Johnson; Andy Munro; Ian Telfer; Barclay Rae; Alastair Webster; Pete Haggarty; Brendan Ring; Taif Ball; Willie Logan; Iain Copeland; Bob Miller; Andy Mitchell; John Allan
- Website: www.newceleste.com

New Celeste are a folk rock band from Scotland, originally formed in 1975, releasing seven albums over five decades, the most recent in 2016.

== Background ==
=== Early years ===
New Celeste was formed in Glasgow in March 1975 by guitarist and singer Iain Fergus, with Jim Yule on lead guitar, Marysia Lessnau on lead vocals and Tom Honeyman on violin. Stewart Smith joined the band a month later on bass guitar. They performed weekly gigs every Wednesday night at the Gresham Hotel in Glasgow and started to perform more widely across Scotland in folk clubs, universities and other venues. They were signed by Unicorn Leisure, a Glasgow company that managed Billy Connolly and Midge Ure's band Slik in the 1970s and that held the lease for The Apollo in Glasgow. New Celeste played concerts across Scotland in the following year and a half, got to the final of the Melody Maker National Folk/Rock Contest at the Roundhouse in London where they performed in front of Noel Redding, one of the judges that year, appeared on various television programmes, including Saturday Night Live and Falkirk Folk on BBC Scotland, and Thingummyjig and a half hour New Celeste in Concert on Scottish Television, directed by Haldane Duncan. This programme was part of an In Concert series which was subsequently aired nationally on ITV. New Celeste also toured in Holland and supported Billy Connolly on the Scottish leg of his tour.

At the end of 1976, Jim Yule and Marysia Lessnau left the band and were replaced by Graeme Duffin, a Glasgow jazz guitarist. Iain Fergus took over lead vocals and Graeme Duffin sang harmony vocals. This line-up supported Billy Connolly on the English leg of his tour and went on to tour in several countries in Europe and recorded two albums, High Sands and the Liquid Lake (1977) in Holland (with guest drummer Ronnie Goodman and sleeve notes by Billy Connolly) on the Universe label and On the Line (1979) in Berlin (with guest drummer Christian Evans and guest keyboard player Henry Hirsch, recorded and produced by Ulli Weigel) on the Hansa Records label, mixed at Hansa Tonstudio, known then as Hansa by the Wall. Both New Celeste albums were also released on the Arfolk label in France. New Celeste performed at the Festival Interceltique de Lorient in August 1977, and were invited back to perform at the festival again on the main stage in Stade du Moustoir in August 1978.

Thereafter they were managed in France by Gerard Bono of Arfolk and toured heavily in Brittany and throughout France. At the end of 1978 Tom Honeyman left the band and was replaced by two violinists, Rod Dorothy and Ronnie Gerrard. In the summer of 1979 Graeme Duffin left the band to join Wet Wet Wet and was replaced by Nigel Clark, another Glasgow jazz guitarist. At the same time, it was decided to add a drummer to the band and Iain Bayne joined the line-up. New Celeste continued to tour Europe and recorded a third album New Celeste Live (1980) in Brittany on the Hexagone label, after which the band broke up, with Iain Bayne joining Runrig shortly afterwards and Nigel Clark joining Hue and Cry. Iain Fergus reformed the group in the summer of 1981 and New Celeste continued to tour Europe until the summer of 1983, with a variety of different line-ups. Jim Yule and Marysia Lessnau returned for one tour and various past members like Iain Bayne, Stewart Smith and Ronnie Gerrard also rejoined for short tours, as well as several new musicians, including Iain Aitken, Steve Donnelly, Jack Johnson, Andy Munro, Ian Telfer, Alastair Webster, Barclay Rae and Joe O'Donnell. The band finally broke up at the end of August 1983.

=== 1990s ===
After a long period of inactivity, Iain Fergus reformed the band in 1990 and recorded an album The Celtic Connection (1991) on Lismor Records. This line-up included former members Rod Dorothy on violin and Iain Aitken on electric and acoustic guitars and guitar synthesizer, as well as new musicians Steve Reid on electric and acoustic guitars, Jerry Soffe on bass guitar, Brendan Ring on uilleann pipes and low whistle and Jeff Helmsley on drums. New Celeste performed at the Cambridge Folk Festival in the summer of 1991, with Pete Haggarty replacing Jeff Helmsley on drums, on Stage One on the Saturday night just before top of the bill act Suzanne Vega and as the final act on Stage Two on the Sunday night and the highlights were played on BBC Radio 1 in December that year. New Celeste toured and performed at various European festivals over the next few years and recorded It's a New Day (1996) for Iona Records. This album mostly featured the same musicians as The Celtic Connection, but with Iain Copeland on drums and additional electric and acoustic guitar by Willie Logan and with Capercaillie guests Charlie McKerron on fiddle and Fred Morrison on Highland Pipes and low whistle and Jim Sutherland on percussion.

=== 2000 to 2010 ===
New Celeste released Best New Celeste (2004) a compilation CD on Park Records featuring tracks from all their previous album releases and including a new recording of "Rosemary", as well as two new bonus tracks "Copper and Gold" and "The Pool". The band continued to tour, as both New Celeste and New Celeste Acoustic, although much less frequently than before and performed at various European festivals including the Festival Interceltique de Lorient in 2005, Folkest in Fruili, Italy in 2008, and Festival de la Saint-Loup in Guingamp, Brittany in 2009, to promote the compilation CD.

=== 2010 to date ===
New Celeste performed at various European festivals including the Festival de Cornouaille in Quimper, Brittany in 2013, the Great British Folk Festival in 2014, and in 2016 released the album. A Perfect Sky on Park Records. This CD features long time members Iain Fergus, Steve Reid and Jerry Soffe, but with new fiddler Gavin Marwick and new drummer Max Saidi. It also includes guest appearances from ex members Graeme Duffin, Iain Copeland and Willie Logan and includes the singles "Such a Lovely Day" (with backing vocals by Rachel Button) and "Love and Freedom". Colin Cunningham plays bass and Wily Bo Walker sings backing vocals on "She's Got No Heart". This new CD was made 'album of the week' by Celtic Music Radio in July 2017.

== Discography ==
New Celeste's discography is as follows:

- High Sands And The Liquid Lake (1977)
- On The Line (1979)
- New Celeste (Live) (1981)
- The Celtic Connection (1990)
- It’s A New Day (1997)
- Best New Celeste (2004)
- A Perfect Sky (2016)
