= If I Never See You Again =

1997 single by Wet Wet Wet

Single by Wet Wet Wet

from the album 10
- B-side: "Straight from My Heart"; "Qu'est-ce que c'est?"
- Released: 10 March 1997
- Recorded: April–May 1996
- Studio: Sarm Hook End Manor (Checkendon, England)
- Length: 3:48
- Label: The Precious Organisation; Mercury
- Songwriter(s): Terry Britten; Graeme Clark; Graham Lyle; Marti Pellow
- Producer(s): Graeme Clark; Graeme Duffin

Wet Wet Wet singles chronology
| "Morning" (1996) | "If I Never See You Again" (1997) | "Strange" (1997) |

"If I Never See You Again" was the first single from Wet Wet Wet's fifth studio album, 10 (1997). It was released on 10 March 1997 and reached number three on the UK Singles Chart. Marti Pellow recorded his own version of the song for inclusion on his 2002 album, Marti Pellow Sings the Hits of Wet Wet Wet & Smile.

== Track listings ==
UK CD1

1. "If I Never See You Again" – 3:48
2. "Straight from My Heart" – 4:37
3. "If I Never See You Again" (acoustic) – 3:57

UK CD2 (limited edition with four postcards)

1. "If I Never See You Again" – 3:48
2. "Straight from My Heart" – 4:37
3. "Qu'est-ce que c'est?" – 2:50
4. "If I Never See You Again" (synth string version) – 3:48

UK cassette single

1. "If I Never See You Again" – 3:48
2. "Straight from My Heart" – 4:37

European CD single

1. "If I Never See You Again" – 3:48
2. "Straight from My Heart" – 4:37
3. "Qu'est-ce que c'est?" – 2:50
4. "If I Never See You Again" (acoustic version) – 3:57

== Credits and personnel ==
Credits are lifted from the UK CD1 liner notes and the 10 booklet.

Studio

- Recorded between April and May 1996 at Sarm Hook End Manor (Checkendon, England)

Personnel

- Terry Britten – writing
- Graeme Clark – writing, production
- Graham Lyle – writing
- Marti Pellow – writing
- Graeme Duffin – all guitars, production
- Fiachra Trench – string arrangement and conducting
- Bob Clearmountain – mixing
- Ian Morrow – programming
- Paul Wright – engineering
- James Brown – engineering
- Tim Wills – engineering assistant

== Charts ==
=== Weekly charts ===
| Chart (1997) | Peak position |
|---|---|
| Belgium (Ultratop 50 Flanders) | 35 |
| Europe (Eurochart Hot 100) | 29 |
| Germany (GfK) | 63 |
| Iceland (Íslenski Listinn Topp 40) | 27 |
| Ireland (IRMA) | 14 |
| Netherlands (Single Top 100) | 72 |
| Scotland (OCC) | 3 |
| Switzerland (Schweizer Hitparade) | 36 |
| UK Singles (OCC) | 3 |

=== Year-end charts ===
| Chart (1997) | Position |
|---|---|
| UK Singles (OCC) | 87 |
