= A New Heaven =

"A New Heaven" is a sonnet by Wilfred Owen, written in England before Owen had seen active service in the trenches of France, probably in September 1916. Some MS drafts bear differing dedications (To — on active service or To a comrade in Flanders). The poem was probably written in Milford Camp, Surrey, which was a part of Witley Camp.

The poem's title echoes a line from Revelation 21:1, "And I saw a new heaven and a new earth". The poem is written from the point of view of a soldier (or soldiers) in France wondering about death; since they have no chance of gaining entry into any mythological afterlife (or even the Christian Paradise), they call on the English Channel ferry - rather than that over the Styx - to take them home and find remembrance and wholeness in their mothers' tears.

Owen's biographer Dominic Hibberd draws parallels with Owen's 1917 poem "Anthem for Doomed Youth", finding a Romantic nostalgia in both which was only expunged in the later poems written at Craiglockhart and after.
