= Somewhere Somehow =

1995 single by Wet Wet Wet

Single by Wet Wet Wet

from the album Picture This
- Released: 18 September 1995
- Recorded: November 1994–January 1995
- Studio: Miraval (Var, France); Whitfield Street (London, England)
- Length: 3:51
- Label: The Precious Organisation; Mercury
- Songwriters: Graeme Clark; Tommy Cunningham; Neil Mitchell; Marti Pellow
- Producers: Graeme Clark; Graeme Duffin; Wet Wet Wet

Wet Wet Wet singles chronology
"Don't Want to Forgive Me Now" (1995)	"Somewhere Somehow" (1995)	"She's All on My Mind" (1995)

"Somewhere Somehow" is a song by Scottish band Wet Wet Wet, released as the fourth single from their fourth studio album, Picture This (1995), on 18 September 1995. The song reached number seven on the UK and Irish Singles Charts. Marti Pellow recorded his own version of the song for inclusion on his 2002 album, Marti Pellow Sings the Hits of Wet Wet Wet & Smile.

== Track listings ==
UK CD1

1. "Somewhere Somehow"
2. "All You Need Is Love" (live from Glasgow SE&CC)
3. "Somewhere Somehow" (live from Glasgow SE&CC)
4. "She Might Never Know" (live from Sheffield Arena)

UK CD2

1. "Somewhere Somehow"
2. "Roll 'Um Easy" (live from London Arena)
3. "Celebration" (live from Wembley Arena)
4. "Gypsy Girl" (live from Manchester Arena)

UK cassette single

1. "Somewhere Somehow"
2. "Morning" (1995 Youth remix)
3. "Somewhere Somehow" (synth string version)

European CD single

1. "Somewhere Somehow"
2. "Morning" (1995 Youth remix)

== Credits and personnel ==
Credits are lifted from the UK CD1 liner notes and the Picture This album booklet.

Studios

- Recorded between November 1994 and January 1995 at Miraval (Var, France) and Whitfield Street (London, England)

Personnel

- Wet Wet Wet – production, arrangement
  - Graeme Clark – writing, fretless bass, assorted basses, production
  - Tommy Cunningham – writing, drums, percussion
  - Neil Mitchell – writing, keyboards, piano
  - Marti Pellow – writing, vocals
- Fiachra Trench – orchestration
- Graeme Duffin – all guitars, production
- Bob Clearmountain – mixing
- Ian Morrow – programming
- Simon Vinestock – engineering
- Andrew Boland – string engineering

== Charts ==
Chart (1995)	Peak position
Europe (Eurochart Hot 100)	45
Europe (European Hit Radio)	15
Germany (GfK)	78
Iceland (Íslenski Listinn Topp 40)	16
Ireland (IRMA)	7
Netherlands (Dutch Top 40)	39
Netherlands (Single Top 100)	44
Scotland Singles (OCC)	3
UK Singles (OCC)	7

== Release history ==
Region	Date	Format(s)	Label(s)	Ref.
United Kingdom	18 September 1995	CD; cassette	The Precious Organisation; Mercury	
Australia	16 October 1995	CD1; cassette	The Precious Organisation; Mercury	
Australia	30 October 1995	CD2	The Precious Organisation; Mercury	
