= Futility =

Futility or Futile may refer to:

- Futility, or the Wreck of the Titan, an 1898 novel
- "Futility" (poem), 1918 poem by Wilfred Owen
- Futile (EP), a 2003 EP album by Porcupine Tree
- Futility (album), a 2004 album of the industrial death metal band DÅÅTH
- Futility, a 1922 novel by William Gerhardie
