= 1914 (disambiguation) =

1914 was a common year starting on Thursday of the Gregorian calendar.

1914 may also refer to:

- 1914 BC, a year in the 20th century BC
- 1914 (band), a Ukrainian metal band
- 1914 (film), a 1931 German drama film directed by Richard Oswald
- 1914 (game), a board wargame published by Avalon Hill in 1968
- "1914" (poem), by Wilfred Owen
