= Soldier's Dream =

Poem written by Wilfred Owen

- by Wilfred Owen (1893-1918)
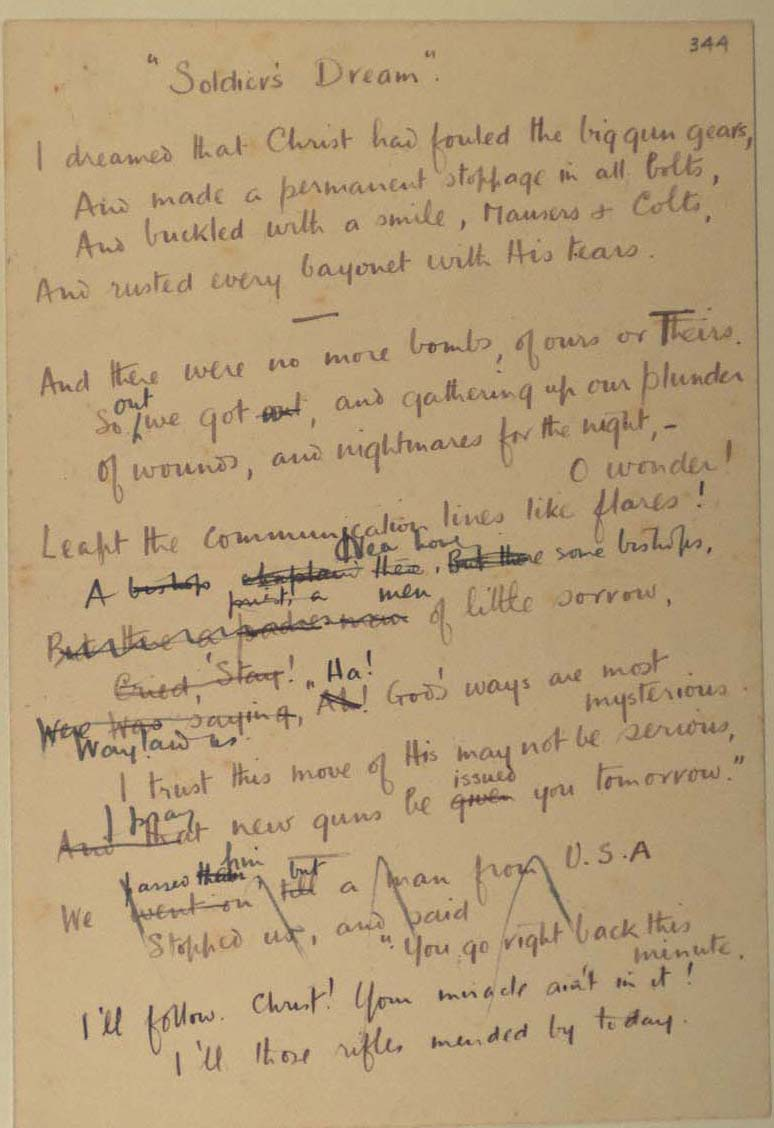
- Original manuscript for Soldier's Dream
- Written: October 1917
- Country: Scotland
- Language: English
- Subject: World War I
- Genre: Poetry
- Form: two quatrains
- Rhyme scheme: ABBA (Enclosed rhyme)
- Publisher: Chatto & Windus
- Publication date: 1983
- Lines: Eight
- Pages: 1

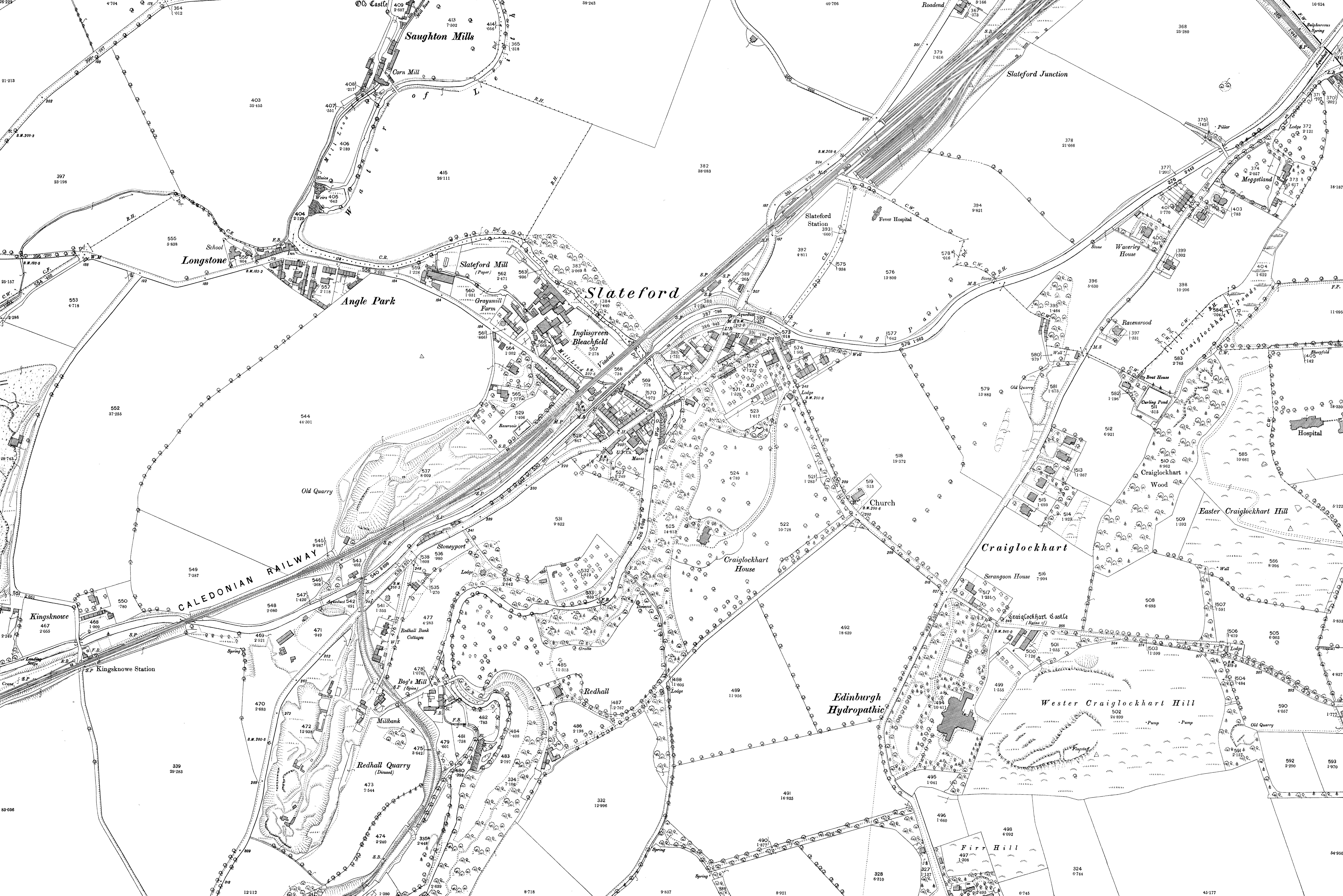
Scottish suburb where Wilfred Owen wrote "Soldier's Dream"

Soldier's Dream

"I dreamed kind Jesus fouled the big-gun gears;
And caused a permanent stoppage in all bolts;
And buckled with a smile Mausers and Colts;
And rusted every bayonet with His tears.

And there were no more bombs, of ours or Theirs,
Not even an old flint-lock, not even a pikel.
But God was vexed, and gave all power to Michael;
And when I woke he'd seen to our repairs."

— 1917

Soldier's Dream is a poem written by English war poet Wilfred Owen. It was written in October 1917 in Craiglockhart, a suburb in the south-west of Edinburgh (Scotland), while the author was recovering from shell shock in the trenches, inflicted during World War I. The poet died one week before the Armistice of Compiègne, which ended the conflict on the Western Front (November 1918).

== History ==
The poem was first published in 1983 as part of The Complete Poems and Fragments.

The original manuscript can now be found in The English Faculty Library at the University of Oxford (St. Cross Building, Manor Road OX2 6NN). In this manuscript it is possible to see Owen's self made corrections: notes, additions and edits. The original version of the poem is different from the published one. In particular there are dissimilarities in the syntactic and lexical structure. For example, in the original script it is written Christ whereas in the published version, the verse reads "'' Kind Jesus . Another difference can be evidenced in the second verse which the author eventually changed: initially he wrote 'Made a permanent stoppage in all bolts ', then he changed it to Caused a permanent stoppage in all bolts .

== Themes ==
The main theme of Wilfred Owen’s Soldier's Dream is the pity of war that he communicates through the image of Jesus smiling kindly. The poet wanted to represent the atrocity of warfare which is why the first stanza is mainly a list of weapons that were used in World War I. Soldier's Dream is a reflection of the author’s feelings about the time he passed in the trenches; unlike other war poets such as Rupert Brooke (author of The Soldier), who did not participate in military actions, Owen had an active role in the conflict. In this poem, the poet represents war as a dreadful parenthesis in human history. He believes that its only purpose is to divide families, friends, and countries. The poem adopts a neutral perspective and does not take anyone's side. It does not state who the enemy is. This means that for the author war is unrighteous no matter which country the soldiers are fighting for or why ("And there were no more bombs, of ours or Theirs"). In the author's opinion war does no good, it is useless and simply unjustifiable. One of the key elements of Owen's conception of poetry is the duty of the poet of being truthful, realistic and inspired by experiences. In the preface of Poems, published posthumously, he wrote: "My subject is war, and the pity of war./ The Poetry is in the pity./ Yet these elegies are to this generation in no sense consolatory. They may be to the next. All a poet can do today is warn. That is why the true Poets must be truthful."

== Title ==
The poet uses a first person narrator to describe the soldier's experience of the dream. This leads the audience to identify the protagonist with the author, a hypothesis strengthened by the fact that Owen himself was a soldier and that he shared his own dreams with the reader in other works (for instance in his poems Strange Meeting, Exposure and Dulce et Decorum est). It has been stated that the poem indicates that the desire for the end of the war does not belong only to the author or only to one soldier, specifically in the first World War, but is shared by all the soldiers of all the world. The poem “Soldier’s Dream” may have been inspired by a popular contemporary World War I song “A soldiers Dream”. The title closely matches Thomas Campbell’s "The Soldier’s Dream" (1804) written during the Crimean War to address the reading public's anxieties and expectations about the welfare of the common soldier.

== Symbols ==
"By creating a simple image of the weapons of war and their destruction followed by the image of their reinstatement, Owen creates a powerful picture of the pro- and anti-war lobbies of his time".

- All the weapons destroyed by Jesus represent the army encountered by Owen on the Western Front during World War I.
- The tears and smiles of Jesus symbolize all the people that protested against the war.
- God sends Michael, the Archangel who leads the Heavenly army, to overthrow the fate of war. Michael reflects the establishment's support of death and destruction.
- Just as the weapons are both literal and symbolic, so is the dream. The dreaming and the awakening from the dream stand for all the hopes and dreams of Owen and his comrades in the midst of the seemingly unending carnage of war.

== Structure ==
This poem is written entirely in quatrains and each of the two stanzas is divided into four verses. The poet's choice of the ABBA rhyme scheme (or enclosed rhyme scheme) emphasizes the simplicity of the poem. The pararhyme of 'Theirs', ‘gears’, ‘tears’ and ‘repairs’ combines the two quatrains together and puts 'Theirs' (take note of the capital letter) at the heart of the poem.

== Style ==
In this poem Owen uses the modern form and language typical of the war poets: the realistic and colloquial language a common soldier might use, to express a strong anti-war message. His poetry (and war poets' poetry in general) is a negation of Georgian poetry which belonged to the pre-war society. The former describes the daily experience of soldiers on the front with realistic and shocking images and language (an excellent example is given by Owen's poem Dulce et Decorum est), in order to show how brutal and meaningless war really is; the latter uses a very bombastic and artificial poetry, intending to present war as a noble affair.

The tone of the poem is melancholic because the soldier misses peace. In the first stanza, the humanity of tone is given by the description of a "kind" Jesus, and of his "tears" and "smile". This tone contrasts with Jesus' act of destroying the weapons of war. In the second stanza, the initial peaceful tone describes how every weapon has been destroyed on either side and contrasts with the penultimate line where God repairs the reality of war, a change introduced by the conjunction "but" at the start of the line.

The poet uses harsh consonants and alliterations to draw attention to the weapons and to stress their power to hurt. Several applications of this device compare in the poem: the alliteration of ‘g’ in the ‘gun gears’; of 'b', in ‘big’ / ‘bolts’ / ‘buckled’ / ‘bayonet’ / ‘bombs’; of ‘p’ in ‘permanent stoppage’ / ‘pikel’ / ‘power’; and the sounds ‘t’ and ‘k’ in ‘bolts’ / ‘Colts’ / ‘bayonet’ / ‘flint lock’ / ‘pikel’.

== Bibliography ==
- Wilfred Owen: The Complete Poems and Fragments edited by Jon Stallworthy, London: Chatto & Windus (1983) ISBN 978-0701127152.
- The Collected Poems of Wilfred Owen edited with an introduction and notes by C. Day-Lewis, and with a memoir by Edmund Blunden, London: Chatto & Windus (1963) ISBN 978-0811201322.
- Wilfred Owen War Poems and Others edited by Dominic Hibberd, London: Chatto and Windus (1973) ISBN 978-0900882463.
- Poems with an introduction by Siegfried Sassoon London: Chatto & Windus (1920) ISBN 978-1514294536.
- The War Poems of Wilfred Owen edited and introduced by Jon Stallworthy, London: Chatto & Windus (1994) ISBN 978-0701161262.
- McPhail, Helen. Portrait of Wilfred Owen : poet and soldier, 1893-1918. [Norwich, England]: Gliddon Books in association with the Wilfred Owen Association. (1993) ISBN 9780947893316.
- Simcox, Kenneth. Wilfred Owen : anthem for a doomed youth (1. publ. ed.). London, England: Woburn Press. (1987) ISBN 978-0713001792
