= Harold Owen =

English biographer (1897–1971)

William Harold Owen (5 September 1897 – 26 November 1971) was the younger brother and biographer of the English poet and soldier, Wilfred Owen. He was born at the home of his paternal grandparents in Canon Street, Shrewsbury, Shropshire, where his parents and older siblings were living before his father moved to a station master's post at Birkenhead in 1898.

For decades Harold Owen tried to control the public image of his dead brother. His three-volume biography of Wilfred, Journey from Obscurity (1963–1965), was for many years assumed to be an accurate and objective record. It has since come to be regarded as a somewhat romanticised version of events. In particular, Harold feared that the public might discover that his brother had been a homosexual and censored many of his letters and diaries.

== Strange meeting ==
During the First World War, Owen served as an officer on the British cruiser HMS Astraea. In the weeks following the armistice, whilst the ship was at anchor of the coast of Cameroons, he fell ill with malaria. It was during this time that Owen claims he had "an extraordinary and inexplicable experience":

I had gone down to my cabin thinking to write some letters. I drew aside the door curtain and stepped inside and to my amazement I saw Wilfred sitting in my chair. I felt shock run through me with appalling force and with it I could feel the blood draining away from my face. I did not rush towards him but walked jerkily into the cabin--all my limbs stiff and slow to respond. I did not sit down but looking at him I spoke quietly: "Wilfred, how did you get here?"

He did not rise and I saw that he was involuntarily immobile, but his eyes which had never left mine were alive with the familiar look of trying to make me understand; when I spoke his whole face broke into his sweetest and most endearing dark smile. I felt not fear--I had none when I first drew my door curtain and saw him there--only exquisite mental pleasure at thus beholding him. He was in uniform and I remember thinking how out of place the khaki looked amongst the cabin furnishings. With this thought I must have turned my eyes away from him; when I looked back my cabin chair was empty . . .

I wondered if I had been dreaming but looking down I saw that I was still standing. Suddenly I felt terribly tired and moving to my bunk I lay down; instantly I went into a deep oblivious sleep. When I woke up I knew with absolute certainty that Wilfred was dead.

Owen learned later that his brother had been killed a week before this experience.
