= Clifton Hotel, Scarborough =

Hotel in Scarborough, North Yorkshire, England

Coordinates: 54.2904°N 0.4048°W

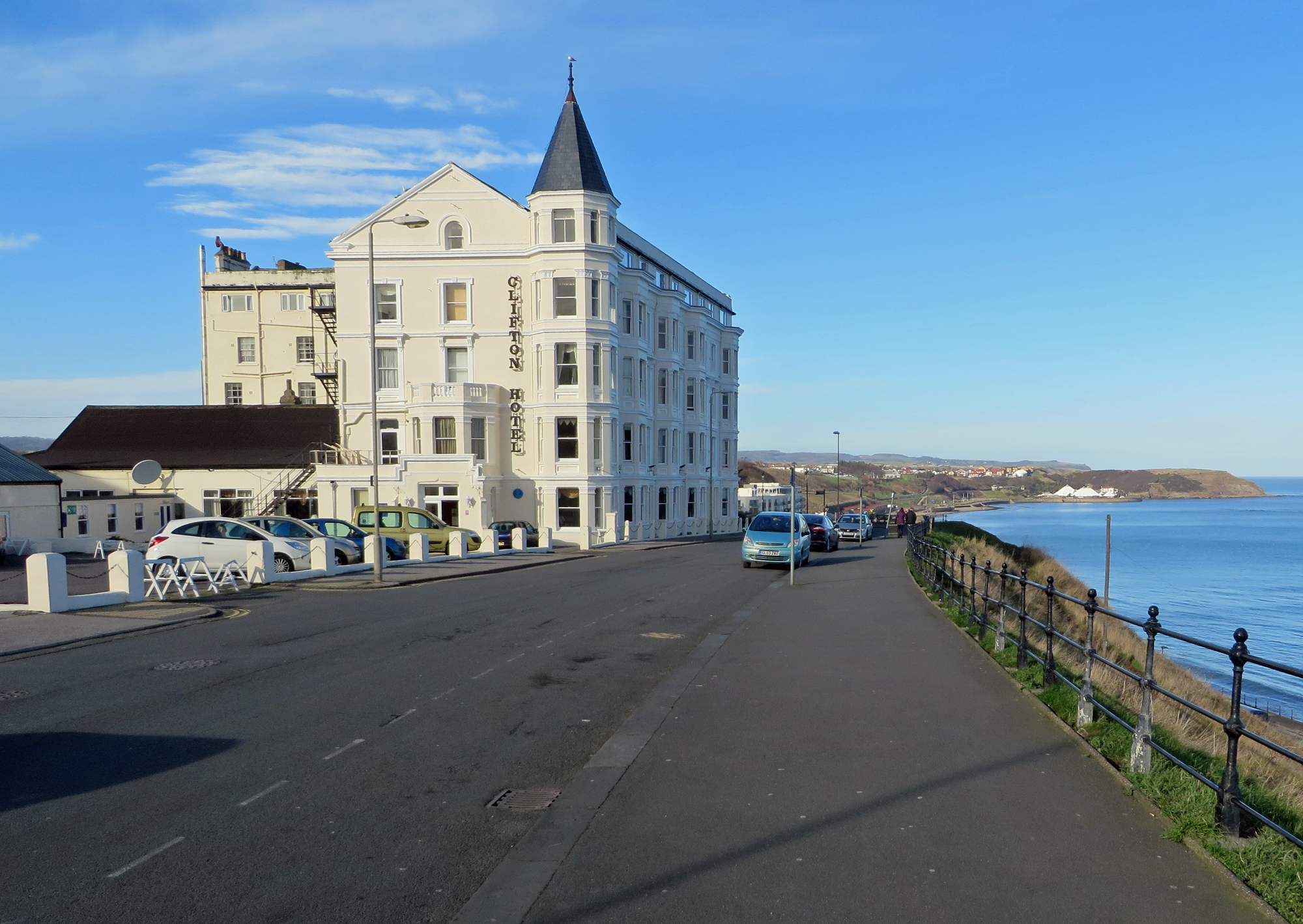
The hotel in 2014

The Clifton Hotel is a small, late Victorian hotel in Scarborough, North Yorkshire, England. The hotel stands on the North Bay cliff tops and was home to soldiers on home duty during both the First World War and Second World War. The location of the building offers good views of the North Sea.

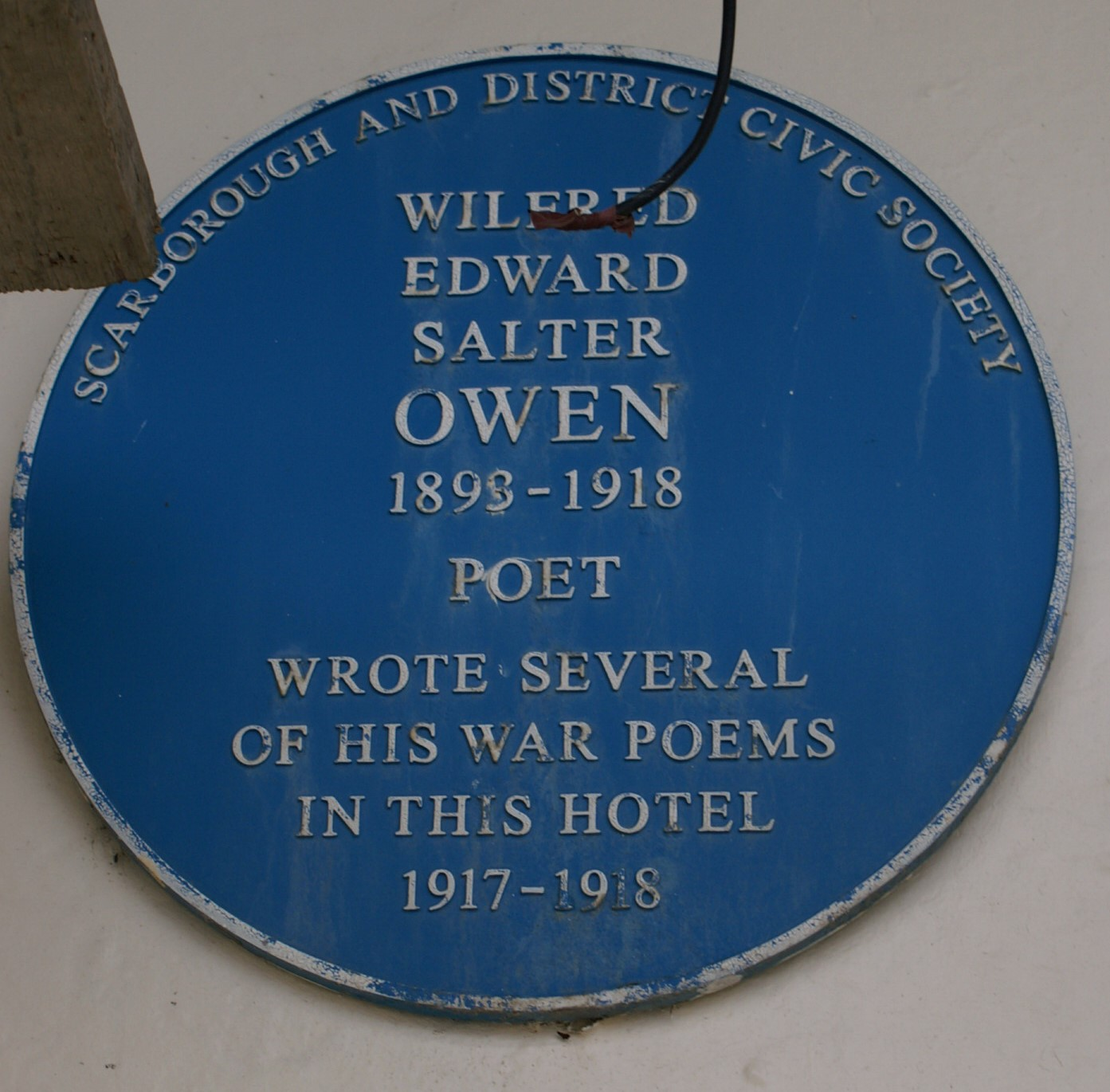
Blue plaque to Wilfred Owen

During the First World War, the hotel was known as the Clarence Gardens Hotel and was home to Wilfred Owen, soldier and war poet, who wrote many of his early war poems while on service and the single occupant of the "turret rooms" for an office and bedroom; now known as bedrooms 493 and 367. A heritage trail blue plaque marks the site today. The hotel is a short distance from Saint Mary's Church and the grave of Anne Brontë. In January 2026, the hotel was grade II listed for its Wilfred Owen connection, with the listing stating it "as a good representative example of a classical, stucco-fronted Victorian seaside hotel with principal elevations of rhythmic canted-bay windows, a late-C19 multi-facetted corner tower where Wilfred Owen’s rooms were situated, and good-quality historic interior."
