= Wild with All Regrets =

1917 poem by Wilfred Owen

"Wild With All Regrets" is a poem by Wilfred Owen. It deals with the atrocities of World War I.

Owen wrote the poem in December 1917, while stationed at Scarborough, and sent it to his friend Siegfried Sassoon. The original manuscript shows a dedication to Sassoon, accompanied by the question "May I?". Owen later expanded the poem into "A Terre".

The poem's title paraphrases a line of Alfred, Lord Tennyson's 1847 poem "The Princess": "Deep as first love, and wild with all regret;"
