= Picture This (Wet Wet Wet album) =

Studio album by Wet Wet Wet
- Released: 10 April 1995
- Recorded: 1994–1995
- Genre: Soft rock; pop; blue-eyed soul
- Length: 45:05
- Label: Mercury
- Producer: Wet Wet Wet

Wet Wet Wet chronology
End of Part One: Their Greatest Hits (1993)	Picture This (1995)	10 (1997)

Singles from Picture This
- 1. "Love Is All Around" Released: 9 May 1994; 2. "Julia Says" Released: 13 March 1995; 3. "Don't Want to Forgive Me Now" Released: 5 June 1995; 4. "Somewhere Somehow" Released: 18 September 1995; 5. "She's All on My Mind" Released: 20 November 1995; 6. "Morning" Released: 18 March 1996

Professional ratings
Review scores
Source	Rating
AllMusic	3/5 stars
NME	6/10
Smash Hits	4/5 stars

Picture This is the fourth studio album released by Scottish pop rock quartet Wet Wet Wet. Released on 10 April 1995, the album was the band's first studio release since the release of their long-running Number #1 single, "Love Is All Around". As well as featuring the aforementioned track, the album spawned five further singles: "Julia Says", "Don't Want to Forgive Me Now", "Somewhere Somehow", "She's All on My Mind" and "Morning". The album peaked at #1 on the UK Albums Chart, becoming one of the band's bestselling releases to date.

In 2015, to mark twenty years of the album's release, a souvenir edition, The Big Picture, was made available, in the form of a double disc deluxe edition and a box set containing three discs and a DVD, entitled All Around and in the Crowd, containing a concert filmed at Wembley Arena on 30 July 1995, plus six promotional videos and five performances from Top of the Pops between 1994 and 1996. The band also embarked on a 2016 tour in honour of the album, playing seven of the twelve tracks featured on the record.

== Track listing ==
All tracks are written by Clark/Cunningham/Mitchell/Pellow, except She Might Never Know lyrics by Chris Difford and Love Is All Around by Reg Presley.

No.	Title	Length
1.	"Julia Says"	4:09
2.	"After the Love Goes"	3:50
3.	"Somewhere Somehow"	3:51
4.	"Gypsy Girl"	2:11
5.	"Don't Want to Forgive Me Now"	2:55
6.	"She Might Never Know"	4:44
7.	"Someone Like You"	3:48
8.	"Love is My Shepherd"	3:23
9.	"She's All on My Mind"	3:55
10.	"Morning"	4:08
11.	"Home Tonight"	4:07
12.	"Love Is All Around"	4:04

Picture This — Australian Special Edition Bonus Disc - All Around and in the Crowd
No.	Title	Length
1.	"Roll 'Um Easy" (Live)	3:14
2.	"Celebration" (Live)	3:49
3.	"Gypsy Girl" (Live)	2:56
4.	"All You Need Is Love" (Live)	5:36
5.	"She Might Never Know" (Live)	4:00

Picture This — 2015 Deluxe Edition Bonus Disc - B-Sides, Rarities & Demos
No.	Title	Length
1.	"I Can Give You Everything" (7" Arthur Baker House Remix)	4:24
2.	"Morning" (Youth 1995 Remix)	3:58
3.	"Dixie"	3:19
4.	"Ain’t No Stoppin’ / Le Freak" (Live From Wembley Arena, 11 December 1993)	5:39
5.	"Is This Love" (Live From Wembley Arena, 11 December 1993)	5:19
6.	"Roll ‘Um Easy" (Live From The London Arena, June 1995)	3:08
7.	"Celebration" (Live From Wembley Arena, June 1995)	3:49
8.	"Somewhere Somehow" (Live From Glasgow SECC, July 1995)	4:17
9.	"She Might Never Know" (Live From Sheffield Arena, June 1995)	3:56
10.	"All You Need Is Love" (Live From Glasgow SECC, July 1995)	5:36
11.	"She’s All on My Mind" (Live From Newcastle Arena, December 1995)	5:43
12.	"Julia Says" (Live From Jakarta Plenary Hall, 4 October 1995)	4:08
13.	"Goodnight Girl" (Live From Melbourne The Carousel, 25 September 1994)	4:25
14.	"Home Tonight" (Demo Version)	3:07
15.	"Gypsy Girl" (Demo Version)	2:16
16.	"After the Love Goes" (Demo Version)	4:30
17.	"Morning" (Demo Version 1)	3:31
18.	"Morning" (Demo Version 2)	4:08

== Charts ==
Chart performance for Picture This
Chart (1995)	Peak position
Australian Albums (ARIA)	22
Austrian Albums (Ö3 Austria)	1
Belgian Albums (Ultratop Flanders)	18
Belgian Albums (Ultratop Wallonia)	19
Dutch Albums (Album Top 100)	4
German Albums (Offizielle Top 100)	6
Hungarian Albums (MAHASZ)	22
New Zealand Albums (RMNZ)	12
Norwegian Albums (VG-lista)	6
Swedish Albums (Sverigetopplistan)	25
Swiss Albums (Schweizer Hitparade)	8
UK Albums (OCC)	1

== Certifications ==
Certifications for Picture This
Region	Certification	Certified units/sales
Europe (IFPI)	Platinum	1,000,000^{*}
United Kingdom (BPI)	3× Platinum	900,000^{^}
^{*} Sales figures based on certification alone.^{^} Shipments figures based on certification alone.
