= Stephen MacDonald =

- Born: 5 May 1933; Birmingham, England
- Died: 12 August 2009 (aged 76)
- Occupation(s): Actor, Director, Dramatist

Stephen MacDonald (5 May 1933 – 12 August 2009) was a British actor, director and dramatist.

MacDonald was brought up and educated in Birmingham, where he trained as an actor, but subsequently worked extensively in Scotland as a theatre director.

As a writer, MacDonald is best known for his 1983 play, Not About Heroes, which concerns the relationship between World War I poets Siegfried Sassoon and Wilfred Owen, and has been produced internationally including an Off-Broadway run with Edward Herrmann and a run at the National Theatre, London, where MacDonald played Sassoon.

In 1971 he began his directorial career, at Leicester Phoenix Theatre. He was instrumental in turning around the fortunes of the Dundee Repertory Theatre in 1972, where as artistic director he mounted 11 new plays by Scottish authors, including Ian Brown, Stewart Conn, Tom Gallacher, John McGrath and Hector MacMillan.

After this post he became artistic director of the Royal Lyceum Theatre in Edinburgh. As he had at Dundee, he promoted drama that looked afresh at historical events.
