= Plas Wilmot =

Birthplace of Wilfred Owen

Coordinates: 52°51′01″N 3°03′20″W

Plas Wilmot is a substantial suburban villa near Oswestry in the United Kingdom. "Plas" is Welsh for a "mansion". The house was originally constructed c.1829 of red brick with slate roof, with additions in the late 19th and early 20th centuries. It was the birthplace of First World War poet Wilfred Owen on 18 March 1893. It became a Grade II listed building in 2012, following a campaign by Oswestry Civic Society and other local groups. The grounds were put on sale in 2013 after the local authority granted planning permission for houses to be built on the land.
