= Not About Heroes =

Drama written by Stephen MacDonald

Not About Heroes is a drama by Stephen MacDonald about the real-life relationship between the poets Wilfred Owen and Siegfried Sassoon first performed in 1982 at the Edinburgh Festival in Edinburgh, Scotland.

The play has only two characters: Owen and Sassoon. The story of their friendship is told in a series of flashbacks, narrated by Sassoon who survived World War I (in which Owen was killed). Most of the scenes take place during their time as fellow-patients at Craiglockhart War Hospital near Edinburgh in 1917.

The title is a quotation from the preface Wilfred Owen wrote in preparation for the publication of his collected poems:

"This book is not about heroes. English poetry is not yet fit to speak of them. Nor is it about deeds, or lands, nor anything about glory, honour, might, majesty, dominion, or power, except War. Above all I am not concerned with Poetry. My subject is War, and the pity of War. The Poetry is in the pity."

== Synopsis ==
The action is replayed through the eyes of an older Siegfried Sassoon, as he recalls his relationship with Wilfred Owen, beginning some fourteen years earlier. Owen introduces himself hesitantly to Sassoon when the latter arrives at Craiglockhart in 1917, having been diagnosed as suffering from "war neurosis" as a result of his protest against the war. The course of their friendship is shown through extracts from the real diaries and letters of the two men, right up to their last meeting at the Chelsea Physic Garden, when Sassoon was recovering from a head wound that would end his military career while Owen waited to return to the Western Front, where he would be killed shortly afterwards.

== Past productions ==
Not About Heroes had its première at the Edinburgh Festival in 1982 and won a Fringe First award. Directed by Eric Standidge, Sassoon was played by the author and Owen by David Learner. It toured and came to the King's Head, was adapted for Yorkshire TV and BBC Radio 4, and was published by Faber and Faber, all in 1983. A new production at the Royal National Theatre in 1986 celebrated the centenary of Sassoon's birth with the author again playing Sassoon and Simon Dutton playing Owen. A national tour took place the following year with Paul Shelley as Siegfried Sassoon and Stephen McGann as Wilfred Owen. In 1992, the author directed a revised text for the Citizen's, Glasgow – a production which afterwards was seen in Shrewsbury as part of the celebrations marking the centenary of Owen's birth.

A production by Dianne Wiest at the Williamstown Theatre Festival transferred to New York City in 1985. Edward Herrmann and Dylan Baker both won OBIE awards. The 1987 Stratford Ontario production, with Nicholas Pennell and Henry Czerny, was revived the following year. Not About Heroes was also performed in the early 1990s at The Round House Theatre in the Maryland suburbs of Washington, D.C.

Stephen McGann played Owen in a production at the Oxford Playhouse in 1987, opposite Paul Shelley as Sassoon. Jonas Armstrong played Owen in a 2000 production at the Edinburgh Fringe.

In October/November 2008, Rowan Tree Theatre Co. in the Scottish Borders, mounted a production of the play to mark the 90th anniversary of the end of the Great War and in celebration of the company's twenty-first birthday. One performance was given in Craiglockhart Hospital, the site of the actual meeting of the two poets. Sassoon was played by Oliver Bisset, and Owen by Matthew Burgess. The play was directed by John Haswell and produced by Judy Steel.

Notable productions of Not About Heroes in recent years have included a version mounted for the 2002 Hay-on-Wye literary festival, starring Roger Moss and Owen Sheers. It was directed by Cathy Gill and produced by the novelist, Louis de Bernières. The following year, Peter Dickson and Andrew Butterworth starred in a production at the Crescent Theatre, Birmingham. In 2005 MADHouse Productions staged a poignant version in the intimate surroundings of the Barons Court Theatre in west London. This production starred Dov Citron as Sassoon and Martin Scully as Owen and was directed by Ian Flintoff. In 2006, Feelgood Theatre Productions premiered a site specific production in the setting of the Imperial War Museum North starring Dan Willis and Sam Ellis. Directed by Caroline Clegg, this production went on to be the first theatre company to perform in the Cabinet War Rooms (Churchill's bunker), followed by a national tour and short sell-out season at Trafalgar Studios, Whitehall, London. Inspired by Not About Heroes at Trafalgar Feelgood created Eloquent Protest a peace event using poetry, song and textas "an artists response to war". Hosted by retired politician and peace campaigner Tony Benn this became a pivotal event for four years, with stars such as Janie Dee, Johnnie Fiori, Sam West, Robert Powell, Jason Isaacs, Roy Bailey, Julian Littman, Clive Rowe, Peter Straker, Jane Milligan and David Harsent. RGP Productions produced the play in Sydney, followed by a season at the Australian War Memorial in Canberra in 2007, starring Roger Gimblett as Sassoon and Patrick Magee as Owen, with direction by Carla Moore. To mark the centenary of the declaration of World War One RGP Productions remounted their 2007 production of the play at the Sydney Opera House in August 2014. The play was broadcast on BBC Radio 7 in November 2007 and November 2008.
