= With an Identity Disc =

With an Identity Disc is a poem written by English poet Wilfred Owen. The poem was drafted on 23 March 1917.

== The Poem ==
If ever I dreamed of my dead name
High in the heart of London, unsurpassed
By Time for ever, and the Fugitive, Fame,
There seeking a long sanctuary at last,

I better that; and recollect with shame
How once I longed to hide it from life's heats
Under those holy cypresses, the same
That shade always the quiet place of Keats,

Now rather thank I God there is no risk
Of gravers scoring it with florid screed,
But let my death be memoried on this disc.
Wear it, sweet friend. Inscribe no date nor deed.
But may thy heart-beat kiss it night and day,
Until the name grow vague and wear away.

== Composition ==
The style of the poem is a sonnet. The name of the poem stems from identity discs that British soldiers wore around their necks during the First World War. The discs were used as evidence for a soldiers death . This poem is influenced by William Shakespeare's Sonnet 104 first two lines; To me, fair friend, you never can be old, For as you were when first your eye I ey'd and John Keats' poem 'When I have Fears that I may Cease to Be'.

== Writing the Poem ==
On the night of 14/15 of March 1917, Owen received a concussion after a fall at Le Quesnoy-en-Santerre. On the same night he was evacuated to a Military Hospital at Nesle. On the 17th of March, Owen was moved to 13th Casualty Clearing Station at Gailly. While recovering, Owen sent a letter to his younger brother Colin,

Perhaps you will think me clean mad and translated by my knock on the head. How shall I prove that my old form of madness has in no way changed? I will send you my last Sonnet, which I started yesterday. I think I will address it to you. Adieu. Mon petit Je t'embrasse.

Owen sent the poem to Colin but Owen revised it six months later at Craiglockhart. The Poem was finalised in August–September 1917.
