= Don't Want to Forgive Me Now =

1995 single by Wet Wet Wet

Single by Wet Wet Wet

from the album Picture This
- B-side: "In the Ghetto" (live); "Gypsy Girl" (live acoustic)
- Released: 5 June 1995
- Recorded: November 1994–January 1995
- Studio: Miraval (Var, France); Whitfield Street (London, England)
- Length: 2:56
- Label: The Precious Organisation; Mercury
- Songwriters: Graeme Clark; Tommy Cunningham; Neil Mitchell; Marti Pellow
- Producers: Graeme Clark; Graeme Duffin; Wet Wet Wet

Wet Wet Wet singles chronology
"Julia Says" (1995)	"Don't Want to Forgive Me Now" (1995)	"Somewhere Somehow" (1995)

Music video
- "Don't Want to Forgive Me Now" on YouTube

"Don't Want to Forgive Me Now" is a song by Scottish band Wet Wet Wet, released as the third single from their fourth studio album, Picture This (1995), on 5 June 1995 by The Precious Organisation and Mercury Records. It reached number seven on the UK Singles Chart and reached the top 20 in Iceland and Ireland. Band member Marti Pellow recorded his own version of the song for inclusion on his 2002 album Marti Pellow Sings the Hits of Wet Wet Wet & Smile.

== Critical reception ==
Tony Cross from Smash Hits was negative and gave the song one out of five, writing, "This is one of their own numbers, and thank God it's a bit more pop than the rest of the cobblers on their current album. But it's still unmemorable middle-of-the-road rock with a hint of country and western thrown in for Jimmy Nail fans."

== Track listings ==
- UK CD1
1. "Don't Want to Forgive Me Now"
2. "In the Ghetto" (live)
3. "Gypsy Girl" (live acoustic)
- UK CD2
1. "Don't Want to Forgive Me Now"
2. "Love Is All Around" (live)
3. "Angel Eyes" (acoustic and live)
- UK cassette single and Japanese mini-CD single
1. "Don't Want to Forgive Me Now"
2. "In the Ghetto" (live)
- Australasian CD single
1. "Don't Want to Forgive Me Now"
2. "Love Is All Around" (Radio One live show)
3. "Angel Eyes" (live Radio One acoustic)
4. "In the Ghetto"

== Credits and personnel ==
Credits are lifted from the UK CD1 liner notes and the Picture This album booklet.

Studios

- Recorded between November 1994 and January 1995 at Miraval (Var, France) and Whitfield Street (London, England)

Personnel

- Wet Wet Wet – production, arrangement
  - Graeme Clark – writing, fretless bass, assorted basses, production
  - Tommy Cunningham – writing, drums, percussion
  - Neil Mitchell – writing, keyboards, piano
  - Marti Pellow – writing, vocals
- Paul Spong – trumpet
- Neil Sidwell – trombone
- Chris White – saxophone
- Graeme Duffin – all guitars, production
- Bob Clearmountain – mixing
- Ian Morrow – programming
- Simon Vinestock – engineering

== Charts ==
=== Weekly charts ===
Chart (1995)	Peak position
Australia (ARIA)	45
Europe (Eurochart Hot 100)	35
Europe (European Hit Radio)	7
Germany (GfK)	66
Iceland (Íslenski Listinn Topp 40)	19
Ireland (IRMA)	18
Netherlands (Dutch Top 40 Tipparade)	15
Netherlands (Single Top 100 Tipparade)	8
New Zealand (Recorded Music NZ)	45
Scotland Singles (OCC)	3
UK Singles (OCC)	7
UK Airplay (Music Week)	1

=== Year-end charts ===
Chart (1995)	Position
Europe (European Hit Radio)	39
UK Airplay (Music Week)	13

== Release history ==
Region	Date	Format(s)	Label(s)	Ref.
United Kingdom	5 June 1995	CD1; cassette	The Precious Organisation; Mercury	
United Kingdom	12 June 1995	CD2	The Precious Organisation; Mercury	
Australia	24 July 1995	CD; cassette	The Precious Organisation; Mercury	
Japan	26 July 1995	Mini-CD	The Precious Organisation; Mercury	
