= The Dead-Beat =

World War I poem by Wilfred Owen

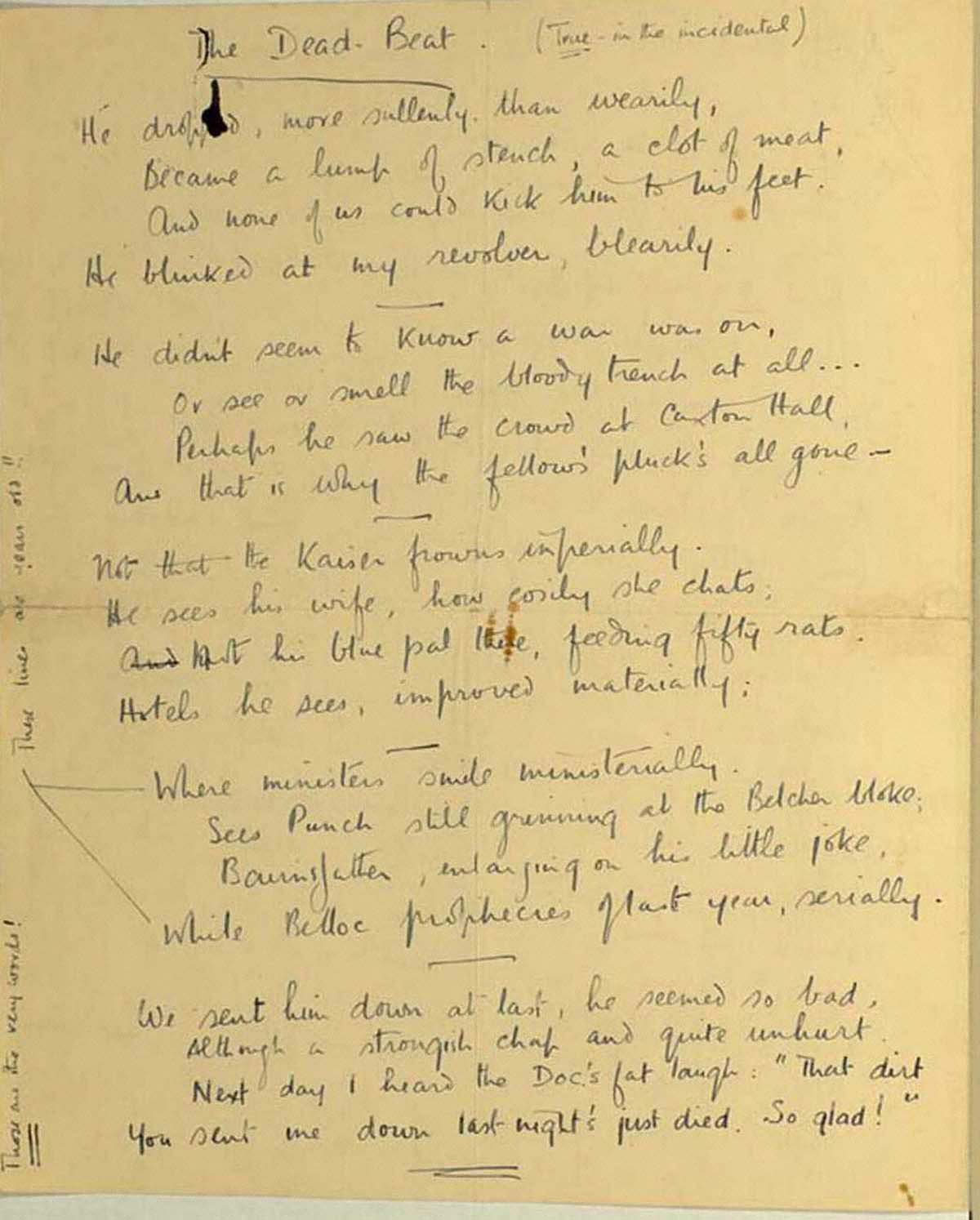
An early draft of the poem Owen included in a letter to Leslie Gunston in August 1917

"The Dead-Beat" is a poem by Wilfred Owen. It deals with the atrocities of World War I.

== Composition ==
Owen developed the poem while he was a patient at Craiglockhart, a hospital for officers suffering with mental illness. It was here that he met fellow poet Siegfried Sassoon and where his personal psychological healing from the traumas of war. "The Dead-Beat" marked the beginning of his writings as representations of soldiers who could no longer tell their own stories.

In writing the poem, Owen received help from Sassoon, who he elsewhere called one of his dearest friends. Sassoon's influence is apparent particularly in the poem's anger over injustice. Owen described the experience in a letter in which he suggested that the middle sections needed work. The night he met Sassoon, he began writing "The Dead-Beat", as described in the letter: "After leaving him, I wrote something in Sassoon's style... The last thing he said was 'Sweat your guts out writing poetry!' 'Eh?' says I. 'Sweat your guts out, I say!'" Pat Barker, in her novel Regeneration, describes a fictitious workshop between the poets based on this letter.

== Analysis ==
Like many of his poems about the war, Owen explored both courage and cowardice in "The Dead-Beat". He also attempts to emulate the vernacular of a common soldier in a realistic war setting. In particular, "The Dead-Beat" depicts how war can isolate rather than unite individuals who share common causes or experiences.
