= Birkenhead Central Library =

Historic library building in Merseyside, England

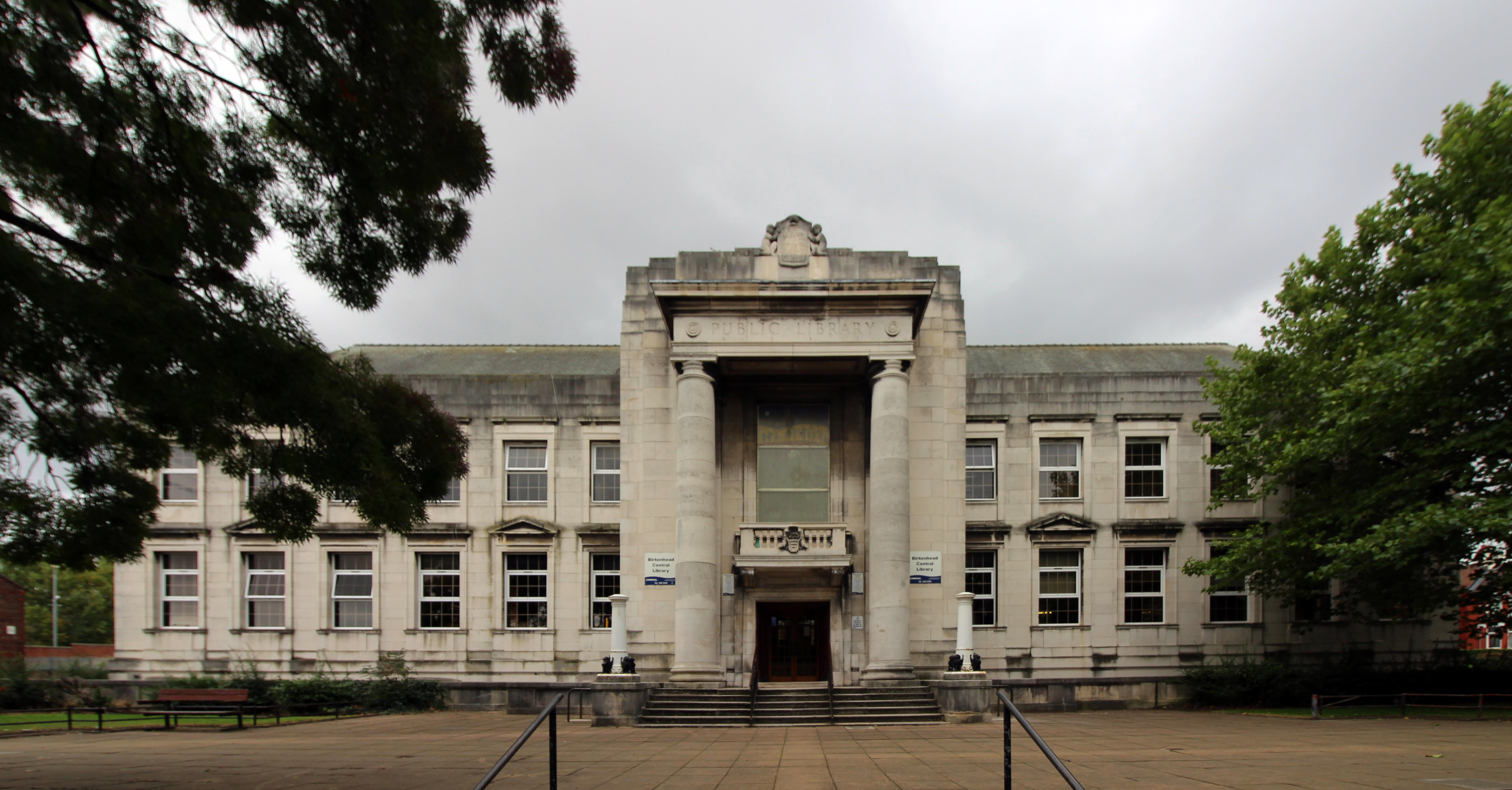
- Front Entrance, Borough Road
- 53.386°N 3.032°W
- Location: Birkenhead, England
- Established: 1856 (original site); 1934 (current site)

Collection
- Size: over 600,000 books

Access and use
- Population served: 311,200

Other information
- Website: Birkenhead Central Library, Wirral Council

Birkenhead Central Library is one of twenty-four libraries (as of March 2011) forming the Wirral Library Service in the Metropolitan Borough of Wirral, Merseyside, England. The library is located on Borough Road, Birkenhead.

== History ==
The original Birkenhead Central Library was opened in 1856 in a different part of Birkenhead from the present-day site. At the time, it was the first public library in the country in an unincorporated borough. The current central library building on Borough Road was opened in 1934 by King George V and is designated by Wirral Council as a historic site.

== Services and activities ==
The library offers the traditional lending service for books including large print, foreign language titles, talking books and digital audio and video media, newspaper and magazine reading and local community information. There is also a dedicated children's library and a reference library on the upper floor containing extensive local archives. The library also offers exhibition/display facilities and room hire.

Other activities include a monthly reading group, storytime for under fives, "baby bounce and rhyme" and Learn Direct computer courses, including ECDL and business courses.

There is also a Friends of Birkenhead Central Library group which holds events on a regular basis.

== Wilfred Owen memorial ==
At the top of the main stairwell is a stained glass memorial window to First World War poet Wilfred Owen. Owen lived in Birkenhead in three homes, all within a mile of the library. The memorial window was designed by David Hillhouse, and was created and made by Bill (William) Davies at his Millers Hay studios in Irby. It was unveiled in 1995 by Peter Owen, the nephew of Wilfred Owen.

== Threat of closure ==
In 2008 it was announced that there were council plans to close the current site as part of a strategic review. The plans included consolidating library services into newer buildings alongside existing leisure facilities at the Europa Pools complex, on the other side of the town centre. As of February 2023, these plans have not come to fruition and the Birkenhead Central Library remains situated in the 1934 building on Borough Road.
