= Mental Cases =

Poem by Wilfred Owen

Mental Cases

Who are these? Why sit they here in twilight?
Wherefore rock they, purgatorial shadows,
Drooping tongues from jaws that slob their relish,
Baring teeth that leer like skulls' tongues wicked?
Stroke on stroke of pain,—but what slow panic,
Gouged these chasms round their fretted sockets?
Ever from their hair and through their hand palms
Misery swelters. Surely we have perished
Sleeping, and walk hell; but who these hellish?

—These are men whose minds the Dead have ravished.
Memory fingers in their hair of murders,
Multitudinous murders they once witnessed.
Wading sloughs of flesh these helpless wander,
Treading blood from lungs that had loved laughter.
Always they must see these things and hear them,
Batter of guns and shatter of flying muscles,
Carnage incomparable and human squander
Rucked too thick for these men's extrication.

Therefore still their eyeballs shrink tormented
Back into their brains, because on their sense
Sunlight seems a bloodsmear; night comes blood-black;
Dawn breaks open like a wound that bleeds afresh
—Thus their heads wear this hilarious, hideous,
Awful falseness of set-smiling corpses.
—Thus their hands are plucking at each other;
Picking at the rope-knouts of their scourging;
Snatching after us who smote them, brother,
Pawing us who dealt them war and madness.

"Mental Cases" is one of Wilfred Owen's more graphic poems. It describes war-torn men suffering from post-traumatic stress disorder, otherwise known as shell shock. Owen based the poem on his experience of Craiglockhart Military Hospital, near Edinburgh, where he was invalided in the summer of 1917 with neurasthenia, and became the patient of Dr A.J. Brock. Using imagery of death and violence, Owen presents a chilling portrait of men haunted by their experiences.

== Short analysis ==
The poem adopts a questioning tone initially, with the speaker asking “Who are these? Why sit they here in twilight?” Owen uses this to present the men almost as strange carnival exhibits to be inspected or wondered at, emphasised by the base pronoun "these". They are depicted as grisly, fascinating creatures, which seem "hellish" to the speaker.

The second stanza goes on to depict memory as a cruel monster which tortures their minds, forcing them to relive the "Carnage incomparable" they witnessed. Owen's chilling contrast between "Treading blood" and "lungs that had loved laughter" echoes a regular theme in his works, that the men who gave themselves for the war had once been amiable and friendly people before the dead "ravished" their minds.

The third stanza describes how those who survived the war live now with shell shock, in that scenes from the battlefield insert themselves into everyday life; sunlight is a "blood-smear" on a window, then night falls "blood-black" - they cannot escape the sight of blood. The macabre tone of the poem is added to by the image of hallucinations of "set-smiling corpses", describing the "hilarious, hideous" faces of the patients as they remember. Typically for Owen, he concludes with blame; it was "us who smote them", and "dealt them war and madness"; this echoes the ending of Owen's most famous poem, Dulce et Decorum Est.
