= Pararhyme =

Form of rhyme involving matched consonants

Pararhyme is a form of rhyme in which there is vowel variation within the same consonant pattern.

== Examples ==
"Strange Meeting" (1918) is a poem by Wilfred Owen, a war poet who used pararhyme in his writing. Here is a part of the poem that shows pararhyme:

Too fast in thought or death to be bestirred.
Then, as I probed them, one sprang up, and stared
With piteous recognition in fixed eyes,
Lifting distressful hands, as if to bless.
And by his smile, I knew that sullen hall,
By his dead smile I knew we stood in Hell.

Pararhyme features in the Welsh cynghanedd poetic forms. The following short poem by Robert Graves is a demonstration in English of the cynghanedd groes form, in which each consonant sound before the caesura is repeated in the same order after the caesura (Graves notes that the ss of 'across' and the s of 'crows' match visually but are not the same sound):

Billet spied,
Bolt sped.
Across field
Crows fled,
Aloft, wounded,
Left one dead.

James Joyce uses a pararhyme in Finnegans Wake (1939) when he says: "First we feel. Then we fall."

Stephen Sondheim, the composer and lyricist, was also well known for using pararhyme, particularly within a line, and not at the end. Examples include: Pinch/punch/paunch/pension(/pouch) from "The Miller's Son," say/so/soy/see and little/latte/later/lotta in "The Waiter's Song," woke/weak/walk in "Love, I Hear," and fits/fights(/feuds) in "Together Wherever We Go."
