= Insensibility =

Poem by Wilfred Owen

"Insensibility" is a poem written by Wilfred Owen during the First World War which explores the effect of warfare on soldiers, and the long- and short-term psychological effects that it has on them. The poem's title refers to the fact that the soldiers have lost the ability to feel due to the horrors which they faced on the Western Front during the First World War.

== Owen and the First World War ==
During and after the First World War many combatants and former combatants found their lives and minds permanently altered by the violent, loud and traumatic life of trench warfare. This disorder was called "shell shock" or "neurasthenia". Wilfred Owen was diagnosed with neurasthenia in 1916, within four months of arriving in France, and was briefly invalided home.

The "We wise" to whom the poem refers might, as Jon Stallworthy has suggested, be construed as "we poets", to which the Owen scholar Douglas Kerr adds the possibilities "we officers", "we shellshocked neurasthenics" and "we cowards". Kerr describes the relationship of the poem to Owen's neurasthenia as "obvious though complex".

== See also ==
- Mental Cases – which also deals with mental trauma.
- Siegfried Sassoon - another World War One poet who mentored Owen
- Craiglockhart Hydropathic - Where Owen met Sassoon
