= Apologia Pro Poemate Meo =

Poem by Wilfred Owen

"Apologia Pro Poemate Meo" is a poem by Wilfred Owen. It deals with the atrocities of World War I. The title means "in defence of my poetry" and is often viewed as a rebuttal to a remark in Robert Graves' letter "for God's sake cheer up and write more optimistically - the war's not ended yet but a poet should have a spirit above wars."

Alternatively, the poem is seen as a possible response to "Apologia Pro Vita Sua".

The poem deals with the themes like death of soldiers, pity of war and futility of fighting in wars.

The poem describes some of the horrors of war and how this leads to a lack of emotion and a desensitisation to death. However the key message of the poem is revealed in the final two stanzas criticizing "you" at home (contemporary readers) for using war propaganda and images as a form of entertainment "These men are worth/ Your tears: You are not worth their merriment."

The poem begins and concludes as follows:

I, too, saw God through mud—
The mud that cracked on cheeks when wretches smiled.
War brought more glory to their eyes than blood,
And gave their laughs more glee than shakes a child.

Merry it was to laugh there—
Where death becomes absurd and life absurder.
For power was on us as we slashed bones bare
Not to feel sickness or remorse of murder.
...
Nevertheless, except you share
With them in hell the sorrowful dark of hell,
Whose world is but the trembling of a flare,
And heaven but as the highway for a shell,

You shall not hear their mirth:
You shall not come to think them well content
By any jest of mine. These men are worth
Your tears: You are not worth their merriment.

— Stanzas 1-2, 8-9
