= At a Calvary near the Ancre =

Poem by Wilfred Owen

"At a Calvary near the Ancre" is a poem by Wilfred Owen. The title references the Ancre, a tributary of the Somme. It was the scene of two notable battles in 1916. The poem is composed of three quatrains with rhyme scheme ABAB.

One ever hangs where shelled roads part.
In this war He too lost a limb,
But His disciples hide apart;
And now the Soldiers bear with Him.

Near Golgotha strolls many a priest,
And in their faces there is pride
That they were flesh-marked by the Beast
By whom the gentle Christ's denied.

The scribes on all the people shove
And bawl allegiance to the state,
But they who love the greater love
Lay down their life; they do not hate.
