= Dulce et Decorum est =

1920 poem by Wilfred Owen

"Dulce et Decorum Est" is a poem written by Wilfred Owen during World War I, and published posthumously in 1920. Its Latin title is from a verse written by the Roman poet Horace: Dulce et decorum est pro patria mori. In English, this means "it is sweet and proper to die for one's country". The poem is one of Owen's most renowned works; it is known for its horrific imagery and its condemnation of war. It was drafted at Craiglockhart in the first half of October 1917 and later revised, probably at Scarborough, but possibly at Ripon, between January and March 1918. The earliest known manuscript is dated 8 October 1917 and is addressed to the poet's mother, Susan Owen, with the note "Here is a gas poem done yesterday (which is not private, but not final)."

== Text ==
Bent double, like old beggars under sacks,
Knock-kneed, coughing like hags, we cursed through sludge,
Till on the haunting flares we turned our backs,
And towards our distant rest began to trudge.
Men marched asleep. Many had lost their boots,
But limped on, blood-shod. All went lame, all blind;
Drunk with fatigue; deaf even to the hoots
Of tired, outstripped Five-Nines that dropped behind.

Gas! GAS! Quick, boys!—An ecstasy of fumbling,
Fitting the clumsy helmets just in time,
But someone still was yelling out and stumbling,
And flound'ring like a man in fire or lime.

Dim through the misty panes and thick green light,
As under a green sea, I saw him drowning.

In all my dreams before my helpless sight,
He plunges at me, guttering, choking, drowning.

If in some smothering dreams, you too could pace
Behind the wagon that we flung him in,
And watch the white eyes writhing in his face,
His hanging face, like a devil's sick of sin,
If you could hear, at every jolt, the blood
Come gargling from the froth-corrupted lungs,
Obscene as cancer,
Bitter (Note: Poems (1920) has "Bitten": plausible, as the topic is "cud". However, the original manuscript is transcribed as "bitter") as the cud
Of vile, incurable sores on innocent tongues,–
My friend, you would not tell with such high zest
To children ardent for some desperate glory,
The old Lie: Dulce et decorum est
Pro patria mori.

== Summary ==
The text presents a vignette from the front lines of World War I: A group of British soldiers on the march are attacked with chlorine gas. Poison-gas artillery shells explode, and one soldier takes too long to put on his gas mask. The speaker of the poem describes the gruesome effects of the gas on the man, and concludes that anyone who sees the reality of war at first hand would not repeat mendacious platitudes such as dulce et decorum est pro patria mori: "How sweet and honourable it is to die for one's country". Owen himself was a soldier who served on the front line during World War I, and his poem is a statement about a type of war atrocity that the poet had personally experienced.

== Dedication ==
Throughout the poem, and particularly strong in the last stanza, there is a running commentary, a letter to Jessie Pope, a civilian propagandist of World War I, who encouraged—"with such high zest"—young men to join the battle, through her poetry, e.g. "Who's for the game?"

The first draft of the poem, indeed, was dedicated to Pope. A later revision amended this to "a certain Poetess", though this did not make it into the final publication, either, as Owen apparently decided to address his poem to the larger audience of war supporters in general such as the women who handed out white feathers during the conflict to men whom they regarded as cowards for not being at the front. In the last stanza, however, the original intention can still be seen in Owen's address.

== Title ==
The title of this poem means "It is sweet and fitting". The title and the Latin exhortation of the final two lines are drawn from the phrase "Dulce et decorum est pro patria mori" written by the Roman poet Horace (Quintus Horatius Flaccus):

Dulce et decorum est pro patria mori:
mors et fugacem persequitur virum
nec parcit inbellis iuventae
poplitibus timidoque tergo.

— Ode III.2.13
Translation:

It is sweet and fitting to die for one's country:
Death [also] catches the fleeing man,
nor spares the battle-shy youth's
hamstrings and cowardly back.

These words were well known and often quoted by supporters of the war near its inception and were, therefore, of particular relevance to soldiers of the era. In 1913, the line Dulce et decorum est pro patria mori was inscribed on the wall of the chapel of the Royal Military College, Sandhurst. In the final stanza of his poem, Owen refers to this as "The old Lie".

Some uncertainty arises around how to pronounce the Latin phrase when the poem is read aloud. There are essentially three choices:

1. The traditional English pronunciation of Latin, current until the early twentieth century – /ˈdʌlseɪ ɛt dɪˈkɔːrəm ˈɛst proʊ ˈpeɪtriə ˈmɔːraɪ/ DUL-say et dih-KOR-əm EST proh PAY-tree-ə MOR-eye.
2. The Italianate or Ecclesiastical Latin pronunciation, used in Owen's day in both the Roman Catholic and Anglican churches, and in continued use today in the Catholic Church – [ˈdultʃe et deˈkorum ˈest pro ˈpatria ˈmori].
3. The Classical Latin pronunciation reconstructed by scholars in the nineteenth century and generally taught in schools since the early 1900s – [ˈdʊɫkeː ɛt dɛˈkoːrũː ˈɛst proː ˈpatriaː ˈmɔriː].

Owen's own schooling took place at a time when the teaching of Latin pronunciation was in transition and therefore – without knowing how he himself would have pronounced the phrase – any of the three versions can be considered acceptable. Based on the rhyme scheme, the first version is the least likely.

== Structure ==
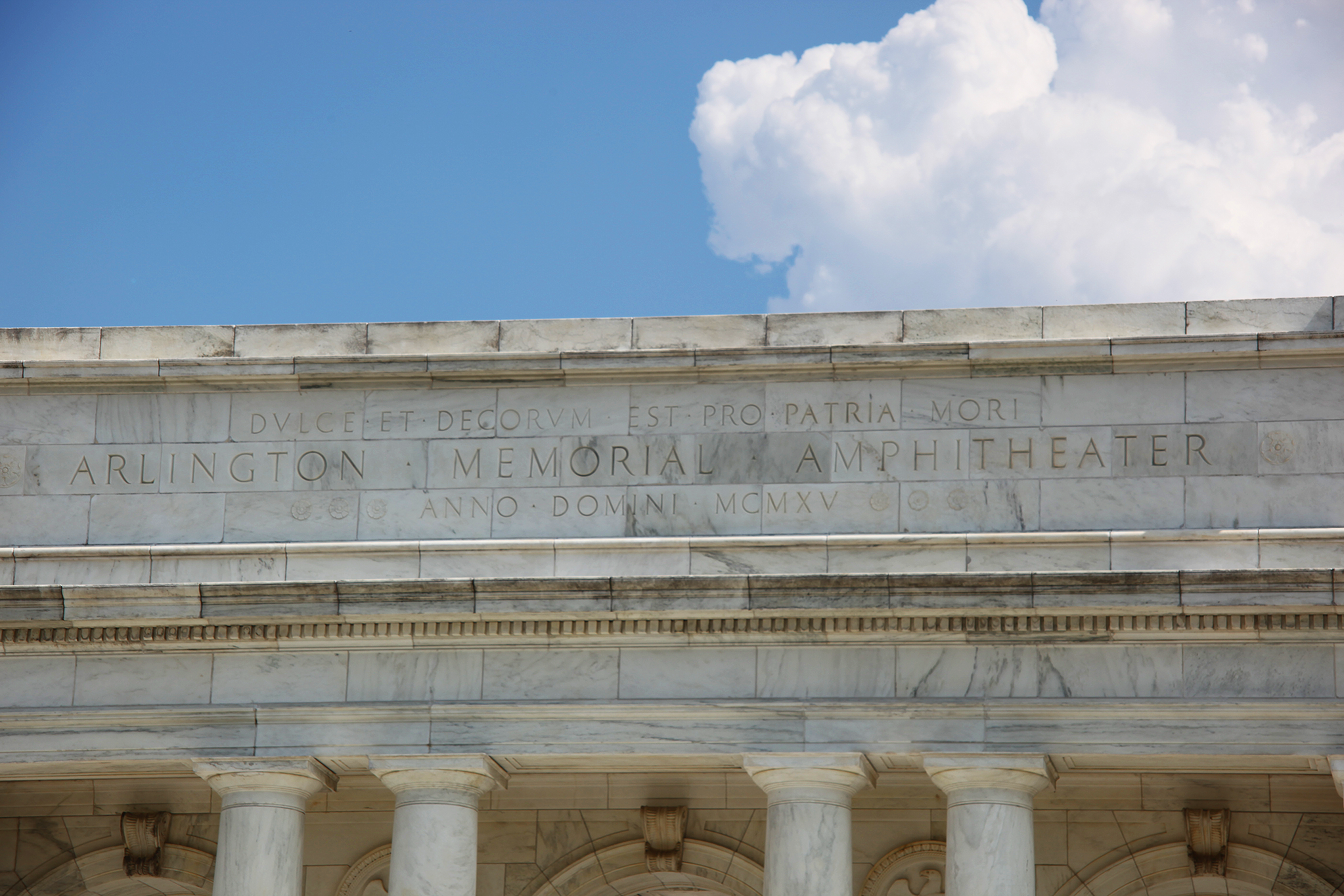
Detail of the inscription over the rear entrance to the Arlington Memorial Amphitheater. The inscription reads: "Dulce et decorum est pro patria mori", written by the Roman poet Horace.

The style of "Dulce et Decorum Est" is similar to the French ballade poetic form. By referencing this formal poetic form and then breaking the conventions of pattern and rhyming, Owen accentuates the disruptive and chaotic events being told. Each of the stanzas has a traditional rhyming scheme, using two quatrains of rhymed iambic pentameter with several spondaic substitutions. These make the poem's reading experience seem close to a casual talking speed and clarity.

The poem is in two parts, each of 14 lines. The first part of the poem (the first 8 line and the second 6 line stanzas) is written in the present as the action happens and everyone is reacting to the events around them. In the second part (the third 2 line and the last 12 line stanzas), the narrator writes as though at a distance from the horror: he refers to what is happening twice as if in a "dream", as though standing back watching the events or even recalling them. Another interpretation is to read the lines literally. "In all my dreams" may mean this sufferer of shell shock is haunted by the friend who suffocated for not managing to wear his gas mask, and cannot sleep without revisiting the horror nightly. The second part looks back to draw a lesson from what happened at the start. The two 14 line parts of the poem echo a formal poetic style, the sonnet, but a broken and unsettling version of this form. This poem is considered by many as one of the best war poems ever written.

Studying the two parts of the poem reveals a change in the use of language from visual impressions outside the body, to sounds produced by the body – or a movement from the visual to the visceral. In the opening lines, the scene is set with visual phrases such as "haunting flares", but after the gas attack the poem has sounds produced by the victim – "guttering", "choking", "gargling". In this way, Owen evokes the terrible effects of chlorine gas corroding the body from inside.

If you exclude the occasional "in", the first Latin (or French) roots only appear near the conclusion-- "vile", "obscene", "incurable", "innocent", etc. This is the language familiar to the educated officer class, on which Owen pours increasing scorn. The first stanzas, the experiences of the men in the trenches, are all in words derived from Old English and the verses themselves recall the sound of Beowulf.

== Composition ==
In May 1917 Owen was diagnosed with neurasthenia (shell-shock) and sent to Craiglockhart hospital near Edinburgh to recover. Whilst receiving treatment at the hospital, Owen became the editor of the hospital magazine, The Hydra, and met the poet Siegfried Sassoon, who was to have a major impact upon his life and work and to play a crucial role in the dissemination of Owen's poetry following his killing in action in 1918, aged 25. Owen wrote a number of his most famous poems at Craiglockhart, including several drafts of "Dulce et Decorum Est", "Soldier's Dream", and "Anthem for Doomed Youth". Sassoon advised and encouraged Owen, and this is evident in a number of drafts which include Sassoon's annotations.

Only five of Owen's poems were published in his lifetime. However, after his death, his heavily-worked manuscript drafts were brought together and published in two different editions by Siegfried Sassoon with the assistance of Edith Sitwell (in 1920) and Edmund Blunden (in 1931).
