= The Parable of the Old Man and the Young =

Poem by Wilfred Owen published 1920

The Parable of the Old Man and the Young

So Abram rose, and clave the wood, and went,
And took the fire with him, and a knife.
And as they sojourned both of them together,
Isaac the first-born spake and said, My Father,
Behold the preparations, fire and iron,
But where the lamb for this burnt-offering?
Then Abram bound the youth with belts and straps,
And builded parapets and trenches there,
And stretchèd forth the knife to slay his son.
When lo! an Angel called him out of heaven,
Saying, Lay not thy hand upon the lad,
Neither do anything to him. Behold,
A ram caught in a thicket by its horns;
Offer the Ram of Pride instead of him.

But the old man would not so, but slew his son,
And half the seed of Europe, one by one.

"The Parable of the Old Man and the Young" is a poem by Wilfred Owen that compares the ascent of Abraham to Mount Moriah and his near-sacrifice of Isaac there with the start of World War I. It had first been published by Siegfried Sassoon in 1920 with the title "The Parable of the Old Man and the Young", without the last line: "And half the seed of Europe, one by one". The poem is an allusion to a story in the Bible, Genesis 22:1-18.

== Overview ==
In the poem, the biblical patriarch Abraham (significantly called by his former name, Abram, in the poem) takes Isaac—his only begotten son by his wife Sarah—with him to make a sacrificial offering to God. The offering, though Isaac does not know this, is to be Isaac himself. "Then Abram bound the youth with belts and straps", which suggests imagery relating to a young soldier being sent, possibly against his will, in a uniform to fight. When he makes to sacrifice his son, an angel calls from heaven, and tells Abram not to harm Isaac. Instead, he must offer the "Ram of Pride". Then the last two lines of the poem diverge from the Biblical account, set apart for greater effect: "But the old man would not so, but slew his son, / and half the seed of Europe, one by one."

"The Parable of the Old Man and the Young" is written loosely in iambic pentameter. It does not use traditional rhyme; instead, the lines are bound together by assonance, consonance, and alliteration.

As the title mentions, the poem is a parable. It is generally accepted that the old man, Abram, represents the European nations or more probably their governments. Another less common opinion is that he represents Germany or Kaiser Wilhelm II, whom some would claim started the war. However, Owen does not blame any individual nation or person in any of his other poems, so there is no reason to believe that he does so in this one. Rather, he condemns all those in power who took their countries to war.

According to the poem, the rulers of Europe believed that sacrificing their nations' (Ram of) Pride was too high a price, yet the irony is that the real cost of this Pride was millions of dead—the seed of Europe.

The last two lines are the only ones that rhyme, and the image they paint is chilling: an old man methodically killing the seed of Europe. It is mainly the power of this image, set out in the poem and culminating in the last two lines, that makes it haunting.

The poem is among those set in the War Requiem of Benjamin Britten.
