= Strange Meeting (poem) =

Poem by Wilfred Owen

"Strange Meeting" is a poem by Wilfred Owen. It deals with the violence of World War I. The poem was written sometime in 1918 and was published in 1919 after Owen's death. The poem is narrated by a soldier who goes to the underworld to escape the hell of the battlefield and there he meets the enemy soldier he killed the day before. The link: https://www.poetryfoundation.org/poems/47395/strange-meeting

This poem has been described as one of Owen's "most haunting and complex war poems".

Pararhyme or double consonance is a particular feature of the poetry of Wilfred Owen and also occurs throughout "Strange Meeting" – the whole poem is written in pararhyming couplets. For example: "And by his smile I knew that sullen hall, / By his dead smile I knew we stood in Hell." The pararhyme here links key words and ideas, without detracting from the meaning and solemnity of the poem, as a full rhyme sometimes does. However, the failure of two similar words to rhyme and the obvious omission of a full rhyme creates a sense of discomfort and incompleteness. It is a discordant note that matches well to the disturbing mood of the poem.

This poem is the final one of Owen's poems set in the War Requiem of Benjamin Britten. It is sung by the tenor and baritone soloists accompanied by chamber orchestra, joined at the closing line "Let us sleep now..." by the full forces of orchestra, organ, and soprano soloist, mixed chorus and children's chorus, singing Latin texts.

The line "I am the enemy you killed, my friend" appears on the memorial sculpture to Owen erected by Wilfred Owen Association, (sculptors husband-and-wife Paul and Ruth de Monchaux) in the grounds of Shrewsbury Abbey (in whose parish his family settled) to mark his birth centenary in 1993.
