= Futility (poem) =

1918 poem by Wilfred Owen

"Futility" is a poem written by Wilfred Owen, one of the most renowned poets of World War I. The poem was written in May 1918 and published as no. 153 in The Complete Poems and Fragments. The poem is well known for its departure from Owen's famous style of including disturbing and graphic images in his work; the poem instead has a more soothing, somewhat light-hearted feel to it in comparison. A previous secretary of the Wilfred Owen Association argues that the bitterness in Owen's other poems "gives place to the pity that characterizes his finest work". "Futility" details an event where a group of soldiers attempts to revive an unconscious soldier by moving him into the warm sunlight on a snowy meadow. However, the "kind old sun" cannot help the soldier – he has died.

Move him into the sun—
Gently its touch awoke him once,
At home, whispering of fields unsown.
Always it woke him, even in France,
Until this morning and this snow.
If anything might rouse him now
The kind old sun will know.

Think how it wakes the seeds—
Woke, once, the clays of a cold star.
Are limbs so dear-achieved, are sides
Full-nerved,—still warm,—too hard to stir?
Was it for this the clay grew tall?
—O what made fatuous sunbeams toil
To break earth's sleep at all?

The titular theme of the poem is claimed to be common to many World War I and World War II war poets and to apply not only to war, but human institutions (including religion) and human existence itself. Noting the "religious" nature of the poem's questioning, academics C.B.Cox and A.E. Dyson claim that "Futility" is a "poetic equivalent...to the famous Tomb in Westminster Abbey".

== Depictions in popular culture ==
In 1982, singer Virginia Astley set "Futility" to music she had composed; the track was included on an NME compilation cassette in October 1982 (credited as The Ravishing Beauties) and on Virginia Astley's 1983 album Promise Nothing. The poem is among those set in the War Requiem of Benjamin Britten.
