= Anthem for Doomed Youth =

1917 poem by Wilfred Owen

- by Wilfred Owen
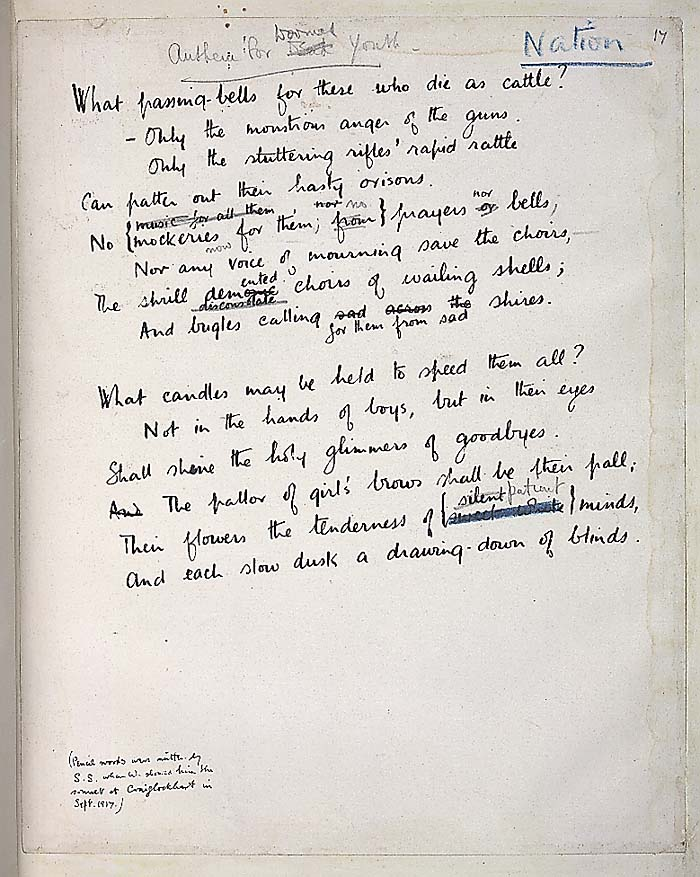
- Original manuscript of Owen's "Anthem for Doomed Youth", showing Sassoon's revisions
- Subject: War
- Meter: or

Anthem for Doomed Youth

"Anthem for Doomed Youth" is a poem written in 1917 by Wilfred Owen. It incorporates the theme of the horror of war.

== Style ==
Like a traditional Petrarchan sonnet, the poem is divided into an octave and sestet. However, its rhyme scheme is neither that of a Petrarchan nor English sonnet, but irregular: ABABCDCD:EFFEGG. Even its indentations are irregular, not following its own rhyme scheme.

Much of the second half of the poem is dedicated to funeral rituals suffered by those families deeply affected by the First World War. The poem does this by following the sorrow of common soldiers in trench warfare, perhaps the battle of the Somme, or Passchendaele. Written between September and October 1917, when Owen was a patient at Craiglockhart War Hospital in Edinburgh recovering from shell shock, the poem is a lament for young soldiers who died in the European War. The poem is also a comment on Owen's rejection of his religion.

== Composition ==
While in the hospital, Owen met and became close friends with another poet, Siegfried Sassoon. Owen asked for his assistance in refining his poems' rough drafts. It was Sassoon who named the start of the poem "anthem", and who also substituted "dead", on the original article, with "doomed"; the famous epithet of "patient minds" is also a correction of his. The amended manuscript copy, in both men's handwriting, still exists and may be found at the Wilfred Owen Manuscript Archive on the World Wide Web. The revision process for the poem was fictionalized by Pat Barker in her novel Regeneration.

It is possible that Owen chose the expression 'passing bells' as a way of reply to the following anonymous prefatory note of the 1916 volume of "Poems of Today", which was in his possession: "This book has been compiled in order that boys and girls, already perhaps familiar with the great classics of the English speech, may also know something of the newer poetry of their own day. Most of the writers are living, and the rest are still vivid memories among us, while one of the youngest, almost as these words are written, has gone singing to lay down his life for his country's cause... There is no arbitrary isolation of one theme from another; they mingle and interpenetrate throughout, to the music of Pan's flute, and of Love's viol, and the bugle-call of Endeavour, and the passing-bells of Death."

== Legacy ==
The poem is among those set in the War Requiem of Benjamin Britten.

During live performances of the song "Paschendale", Iron Maiden singer Bruce Dickinson often recites the first half of the poem.

The title of BBC WW1 drama The Passing Bells derives from the first line of the poem: "What passing-bells for these who die as cattle?"

The third album by British band The Libertines is named Anthems for Doomed Youth, and features a song of the same name.

American composer Stephen Whitehead included an orchestral setting of "Anthem for Doomed Youth" as a movement in his orchestral piece "Three Laments on the Great War" for soloists and orchestra. The piece is scored as a duet for mezzo-soprano and bass/baritone with orchestra.

== See also ==
- World War I in literature
