= Graeme Duffin =

British musician

- Born: Graeme Ian Duffin; 28 February 1956 (age 70); Glasgow, Scotland
- Genre: Pop
- Occupations: Musician, songwriter, record producer
- Instruments: Guitar, acoustic guitar, slide guitar
- Years active: 1970s–present

Graeme Ian Duffin (born 28 February 1956) is a Scottish musician. He has played guitar for the Scottish pop band Wet Wet Wet since 1983.

He is a Christian. with links to Queens Park Baptist Church Glasgow

In an interview with British Stammering Association trustee Eddie Phillips (Speaking Out, Autumn 2004, page 3) Duffin describes his experience of stammering severely during a radio interview in which he was attempting to discuss his work with Wet Wet Wet:

"I blocked on every syllable of every word, and they couldn't use the interview. I came out of the studio exhausted, disheartened, embarrassed. Two years ago I had an interview there that went really well. That partly reflects my level of confidence in my ability to deal with and enjoy that situation now."

In addition to his role as a guitarist with the Wets and Director of the Foundry Music Lab, Duffin is actively involved in the work of the British Stammering Association Scotland, and is also an instructor/facilitator for the McGuire Programme.

In February 2006, Duffin opened Foundry Music Lab a recording, rehearsal and teaching facility with two of his friends, Ted Blakeway and Sandy Jones, in Motherwell.

In October 2006, Duffin joined Wets frontman Marti Pellow for a two-month tour in support of the latter's Moonlight Over Memphis solo album.
