= Wilfred Owen =

English poet and soldier (1893–1918)

Wilfred Owen MC
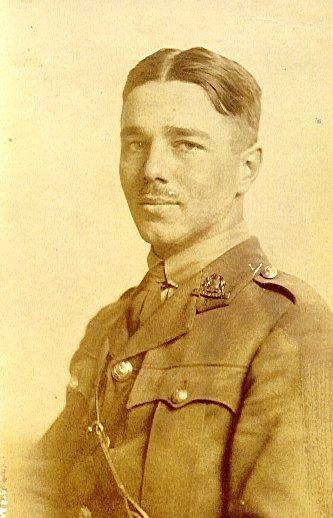
- Wilfred Owen in uniform
- Born: Wilfred Edward Salter Owen; 18 March 1893; Oswestry, Shropshire, England
- Died: 4 November 1918 (aged 25); Sambre–Oise Canal, France
- Writing career
- Genre: War poetry
- Military career
- Branch: British Army
- Service years: 1915–1918
- Rank: Lieutenant
- Units: Artists Rifles; Manchester Regiment
- Conflicts: First World War
- Awards: Military Cross
- Website: www.wilfredowen.org.uk

Wilfred Edward Salter Owen (18 March 1893 – 4 November 1918) was an English poet and soldier. He was one of the leading poets of the First World War. His war poetry on the horrors of trenches and gas warfare was much influenced by his mentor Siegfried Sassoon and stood in contrast to the public perception of war at the time and to the confidently patriotic verse written by earlier war poets such as Rupert Brooke. Among his best-known works – most of which were published posthumously – are "Dulce et Decorum est", "Insensibility", "Anthem for Doomed Youth", "Futility" and "Strange Meeting". Owen was killed in action on 4 November 1918, a week before the Armistice, at the age of 25.

== Early life ==
Owen was born on 18 March 1893 at Plas Wilmot, a house in Weston Lane, near Oswestry in Shropshire. He was the eldest of Thomas and (Harriett) Susan Owen (née Shaw)'s four children; his siblings were Mary Millard, (William) Harold, and Colin Shaw Owen. At the time of Owen's birth, his parents lived in a comfortable house owned by his grandfather, Edward Shaw.

After Edward's death in January 1897, and the house's sale in March, the family lodged in the back streets of Birkenhead. There Thomas Owen temporarily worked in the town employed by a railway company. Thomas transferred to Shrewsbury in April 1897 where the family lived with Thomas's parents in Canon Street.

Thomas Owen transferred back to Birkenhead in 1898 when he became stationmaster at Woodside station. The family lived with him at three successive homes in the Tranmere district area of the town. They then moved back to Shrewsbury in 1907. Wilfred Owen was educated at the Birkenhead Institute and at Shrewsbury Technical School (later known as the Wakeman School).

Owen discovered his poetic vocation in about 1904 during a holiday spent in Cheshire. He was raised as an Anglican of the evangelical type, and in his youth was a devout believer. His early influences included the Bible and the Romantic poets, particularly Wordsworth and John Keats.

Owen's last two years of formal education saw him as a pupil-teacher at the Wyle Cop school in Shrewsbury. In 1911 he passed the matriculation exam for the University of London, but not with the first-class honours needed for a scholarship, which in his family's circumstances was the only way he could have afforded to attend.

Owen worked as a lay assistant to the Vicar of Dunsden near Reading, living in the vicarage from September 1911 to February 1913 in return for free lodging, and some tuition for the entrance exam. During this time he attended classes at University College, Reading (now the University of Reading), in botany and later, at the urging of Professor Edith Morley, the head of the English Department, took free lessons in Old English. His time spent at Dunsden parish led him to disillusionment with the Church, both in its ceremony and its failure to provide aid for those in need.

From 1913 he worked as a private tutor teaching English and French at the Berlitz School of Languages in Bordeaux, France, and later with a family. There he met the older French poet Laurent Tailhade, with whom he later corresponded in French. When war broke out, Owen did not rush to enlist – and even considered joining the French army – but eventually returned to England.

== War service ==
On 21 October 1915, he enlisted in the Artists Rifles. For the next seven months, he trained at Hare Hall Camp in Essex. On 4 June 1916, he was commissioned as a second lieutenant (on probation) in the Manchester Regiment. Initially Owen held his troops in contempt for their loutish behaviour, and in a letter to his mother described his company as "expressionless lumps". However, his imaginative existence was to be changed dramatically by a number of traumatic experiences. He fell into a shell hole and suffered concussion; he was caught in the blast of a trench mortar shell and spent several days unconscious on an embankment lying amongst the remains of one of his fellow officers. Soon afterward, Owen was diagnosed with neurasthenia or shell shock and sent to Craiglockhart War Hospital in Edinburgh for treatment. It was while recuperating at Craiglockhart that he met fellow poet Siegfried Sassoon, an encounter that was to transform Owen's life.

Whilst at Craiglockhart he made friends in Edinburgh's artistic and literary circles, and did some teaching at the Tynecastle High School, in a poor area of the city. In November he was discharged from Craiglockhart, judged fit for light regimental duties. He spent a contented and fruitful winter in Scarborough, North Yorkshire, and in March 1918 was posted to the Northern Command Depot at Ripon. While in Ripon he composed or revised a number of poems, including "Futility" and "Strange Meeting". His 25th birthday was spent quietly at Ripon Cathedral, which is dedicated to his namesake, St. Wilfrid of Hexham.

Owen returned in July 1918, to active service in France, although he might have stayed on home-duty indefinitely. His decision to return was probably the result of Sassoon's being sent back to England, after being shot in the head in an apparent "friendly fire" incident, and put on sick-leave for the remaining duration of the war. Owen saw it as his duty to add his voice to that of Sassoon, that the horrific realities of the war might continue to be told. Sassoon was violently opposed to the idea of Owen returning to the trenches, threatening to "stab [him] in the leg" if he tried it. Aware of his attitude, Owen did not inform him of his action until he was once again in France.

At the very end of August 1918, Owen returned to the front line. On 1 October 1918, Owen led units of the Second Manchesters to storm a number of German strong points near the village of Joncourt. For his courage and leadership in the Joncourt action, he was awarded the Military Cross, an award he had always sought in order to justify himself as a war poet, but the award was not gazetted until 15 February 1919. The citation followed on 30 July 1919:

2nd Lt, Wilfred Edward Salter Owen, 5th Bn. Manch. R., T.F., attd. 2nd Bn. For conspicuous gallantry and devotion to duty in the attack on the Fonsomme Line on October 1st/2nd, 1918. On the company commander becoming a casualty, he assumed command and showed fine leadership and resisted a heavy counter-attack. He personally manipulated a captured enemy machine gun from an isolated position and inflicted considerable losses on the enemy. Throughout he behaved most gallantly.

== Death ==
Owen was killed in action on 4 November 1918 during the crossing of the Sambre–Oise Canal, exactly one week (almost to the hour) before the signing of the Armistice which ended the war, and was promoted to the rank of Lieutenant the day after his death. His mother received the telegram informing her of his death on Armistice Day, as the church bells in Shrewsbury were ringing out in celebration. Owen is buried at Ors Communal Cemetery, Ors, in northern France. The inscription on his gravestone was modified from his poetry by his mother, Susan; she omitted the trailing question mark which questions faith to present Owen as more pious: "SHALL LIFE RENEW THESE BODIES? OF A TRUTH ALL DEATH WILL HE ANNUL" W.O.

== Poetry ==
Owen is regarded by many as the greatest poet of the First World War, known for his verse about the horrors of trench and gas warfare. He had been writing poetry for some years before the war, himself dating his poetic beginnings to a stay at Broxton by the Hill when he was ten years old.

The poetry of William Butler Yeats was a significant influence for Owen, but Yeats did not reciprocate Owen's admiration, excluding him from The Oxford Book of Modern Verse, a decision Yeats later defended, saying Owen was "all blood, dirt, and sucked sugar stick" and "unworthy of the poet's corner of a country newspaper". Yeats elaborated: "In all the great tragedies, tragedy is a joy to the man who dies ... If war is necessary in our time and place, it is best to forget its suffering as we do the discomfort of fever ..."

The Romantic poets Keats and Shelley influenced much of his early writing and poetry. His great friend, the poet Siegfried Sassoon, later had a profound effect on his poetic voice, and Owen's most famous poems ("Dulce et Decorum est" and "Anthem for Doomed Youth") show direct results of Sassoon's influence. Manuscript copies of the poems survive, annotated in Sassoon's handwriting. Owen's poetry would eventually be more widely acclaimed than that of his mentor. While his use of pararhyme with heavy reliance on assonance was innovative, he was not the only poet at the time to use these particular techniques. He was, however, one of the first to experiment with it extensively.

Anthem for Doomed Youth

What passing-bells for these who die as cattle?
Only the monstrous anger of the guns.
Only the stuttering rifles' rapid rattle
Can patter out their hasty orisons.
No mockeries now for them; no prayers nor bells,
Nor any voice of mourning save the choirs, –
The shrill, demented choirs of wailing shells;
And bugles calling for them from sad shires.

What candles may be held to speed them all?
Not in the hands of boys, but in their eyes
Shall shine the holy glimmers of goodbyes.
The pallor of girls' brows shall be their pall;
Their flowers the tenderness of patient minds,
And each slow dusk a drawing down of blinds.

— 1920

His poetry itself underwent significant changes in 1917. As a part of his therapy at Craiglockhart, Owen's doctor, Arthur Brock, encouraged Owen to translate his experiences, specifically the experiences he relived in his dreams, into poetry. Sassoon, who was becoming influenced by Freudian psychoanalysis, aided him here, showing Owen through example what poetry could do. Sassoon's use of satire influenced Owen, who tried his hand at writing "in Sassoon's style". Further, the content of Owen's verse was undeniably changed by his work with Sassoon. Sassoon's emphasis on realism and "writing from experience" was contrary to Owen's hitherto romantic-influenced style, as seen in his earlier sonnets. Owen was to take both Sassoon's gritty realism and his own romantic notions and create a poetic synthesis that was both potent and sympathetic, as summarised by his famous phrase "the pity of war". In this way, Owen's poetry is quite distinctive, and he is, by many, considered a greater poet than Sassoon. Nonetheless, Sassoon contributed to Owen's popularity by his strong promotion of his poetry, both before and after Owen's death, and his editing was instrumental in the making of Owen as a poet.

Owen's poems had the benefit of strong patronage, and it was a combination of Sassoon's influence, support from Edith Sitwell, and the preparation of a new and fuller edition of the poems in 1931 by Edmund Blunden that ensured his popularity, coupled with a revival of interest in his poetry in the 1960s which plucked him out of a relatively exclusive readership into the public eye. Though he had plans for a volume of verse, for which he had written a "Preface", he never saw his own work published apart from those poems he included in The Hydra, the magazine he edited at Craiglockhart War Hospital, and "Miners", which was published in The Nation.

There were many other influences on Owen's poetry, including his mother. His letters to her provide an insight into Owen's life at the front, and the development of his philosophy regarding the war. Graphic details of the horror Owen witnessed were never spared. Owen's experiences with religion also heavily influenced his poetry, notably in poems such as "Anthem for Doomed Youth", in which the ceremony of a funeral is re-enacted not in a church, but on the battlefield itself, and "At a Calvary near the Ancre", which comments on the Crucifixion of Christ. Owen's experiences in war led him further to challenge his religious beliefs, claiming in his poem "Exposure" that "love of God seems dying".

Only five of Owen's poems were published before his death, one in fragmentary form. His best known poems include "Anthem for Doomed Youth", "Futility", "Dulce Et Decorum Est", "The Parable of the Old Men and the Young" and "Strange Meeting". However, most of them were published posthumously: Poems (1920), The Poems of Wilfred Owen (1931), The Collected Poems of Wilfred Owen (1963), The Complete Poems and Fragments (1983); fundamental in this last collection is the poem Soldier's Dream, that deals with Owen's conception of war.

Owen's full unexpurgated opus is in the academic two-volume work The Complete Poems and Fragments (1994) by Jon Stallworthy. Many of his poems have never been published in popular form.

In 1975 Mrs. Harold Owen, Wilfred's sister-in-law, donated all of the manuscripts, photographs and letters which her late husband had owned to the University of Oxford's English Faculty Library. As well as the personal artifacts, this also includes all of Owen's personal library and an almost complete set of The Hydra – the magazine of Craiglockhart War Hospital. These can be accessed by any member of the public on application in advance to the English Faculty librarian.

The Harry Ransom Humanities Research Center at the University of Texas at Austin holds a large collection of Owen's family correspondence.

== Sexuality ==
Though it has been suggested that Owen hoped to marry Albertina Dauthieu, at the time living in Milnathort, Scotland, had he survived the war, Robert Graves and Sacheverell Sitwell, both of whom knew him, believed that Owen was homosexual, and that homoeroticism was a central element in much of his poetry. Through Sassoon, Owen was introduced to a sophisticated homosexual literary circle which included Oscar Wilde's friend Robbie Ross, writer and poet Osbert Sitwell, and Scottish writer C. K. Scott Moncrieff, the translator of Marcel Proust. This contact, it is argued, broadened Owen's outlook, and increased his confidence in incorporating homoerotic elements into his work. Historians have debated whether Owen had an affair with Scott Moncrieff in May 1918; the latter had dedicated various works to a "Mr W.O.", but Owen never responded.

Throughout Owen's lifetime and for decades after, homosexual activity between men was a punishable offence throughout the United Kingdom, and the account of Owen's sexual development has been somewhat obscured because his brother Harold removed what he considered discreditable passages in Owen's letters and diaries after the death of their mother. Andrew Motion wrote of Owen's relationship with Sassoon: "On the one hand, Sassoon's wealth, posh connections and aristocratic manner appealed to the snob in Owen: on the other, Sassoon's homosexuality admitted Owen to a style of living and thinking that he found naturally sympathetic." Sassoon, by his own account, was not actively homosexual at this time, but began his first love affair just after the war ended, in November 1918.

An important turning point in Owen scholarship occurred in 1987 when the New Statesman published the polemic "The Truth Untold" by Jonathan Cutbill, the literary executor of Edward Carpenter, which attacked the academic suppression of Owen as a poet of homosexual experience. Amongst the article's contentions was that the poem "Shadwell Stair", previously alleged to be mysterious, was a straightforward elegy to homosexual soliciting in an area of the London docks once renowned for it. In June 2022 the poem was included in the anthology, "100 Queer Poems", compiled by Andrew McMillan and Mary Jean Chan.

== Relationship with Sassoon ==
Owen held Siegfried Sassoon in an esteem not far from hero-worship, remarking to his mother that he was "not worthy to light [Sassoon's] pipe". The relationship clearly had a profound impact on Owen, who wrote in his first letter to Sassoon after leaving Craiglockhart "You have fixed my life – however short". Sassoon wrote that he took "an instinctive liking to him", and recalled their time together "with affection". On the evening of 3 November 1917 they parted, Owen having been discharged from Craiglockhart. He was stationed on home-duty in Scarborough for several months, during which time he associated with members of the artistic circle into which Sassoon had introduced him, which included Robbie Ross and Robert Graves. He also met H. G. Wells and Arnold Bennett, and it was during this period he developed the stylistic voice for which he is now recognised. Many of his early poems were penned while stationed at the Clarence Garden Hotel, now the Clifton Hotel, in Scarborough's North Bay. A blue plaque on the hotel marks its association with Owen.

Sassoon and Owen kept in touch through correspondence, and after Sassoon was shot in the head in July 1918 and sent back to the UK to recover, they met in August and spent what Sassoon described as "the whole of a hot cloudless afternoon together." They never saw each other again. About three weeks later, Owen wrote to bid Sassoon farewell, as he was on the way back to France, and they continued to communicate. After the Armistice, Sassoon waited in vain for word from Owen, only to be told of his death several months later. The loss grieved Sassoon greatly, and he was never "able to accept that disappearance philosophically." Many years later, he is said, snobbishly, to have told Stephen Spender that he found Owen's grammar school accent "embarrassing". However, in his own account of his friendship with Owen, which appeared in his 1945 autobiography, Siegfried's Journey, Sassoon writes that Owen's death created "a chasm in my private existence", Sassoon expressed regret at what he regarded as his "slowness in discovering that [Owen] was to be of high significance for me, both as a poet and friend...and there was much comfort in his companionship".

== Legacy ==
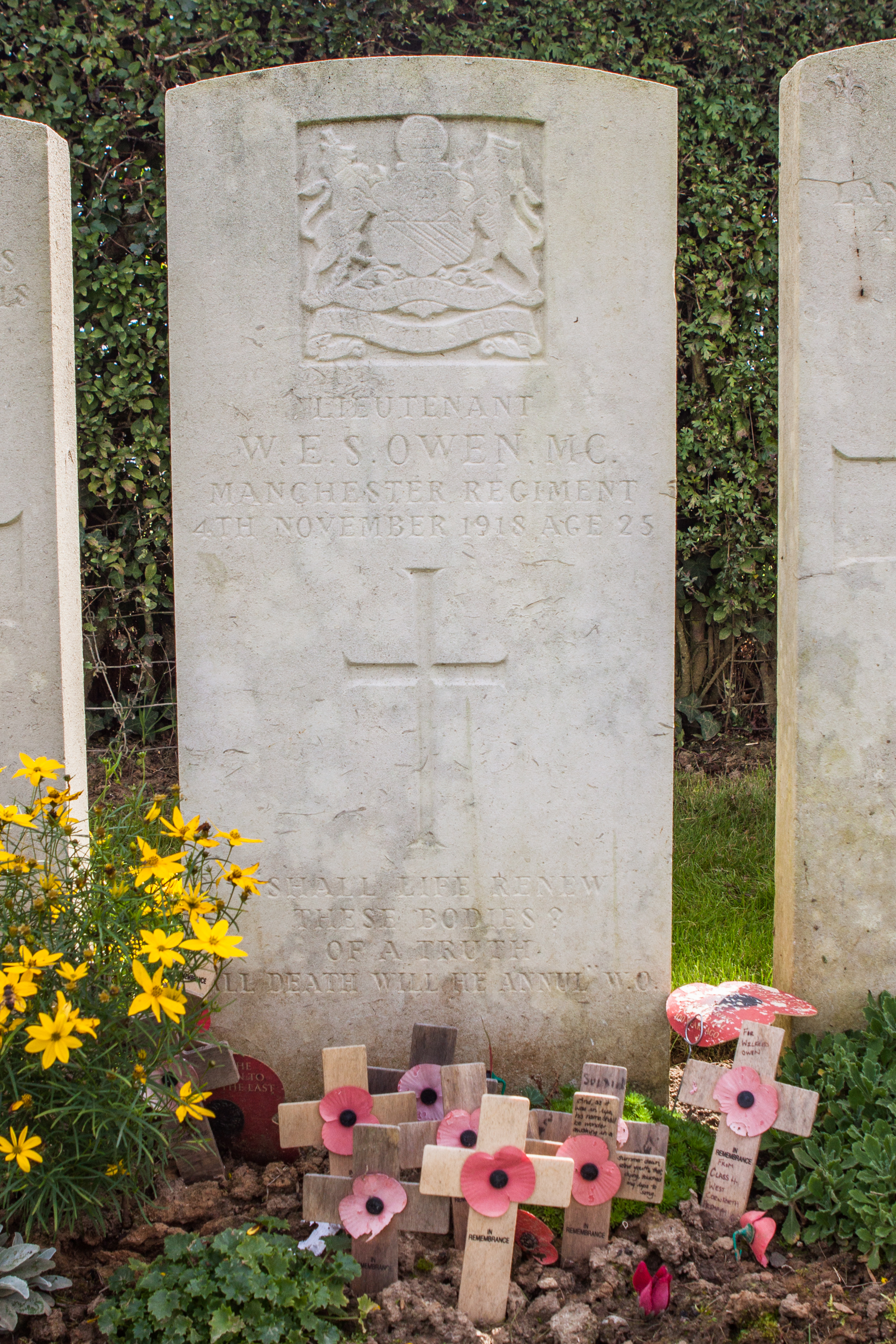
Owen's grave, in Ors communal cemetery

=== Memorials ===
There are memorials to Owen at Gailly near Sailly-Laurette, Ors Communal Cemetery, near St Oswalds Church in Oswestry, Birkenhead Central Library and Shrewsbury Abbey.

On 11 November 1985, Owen was one of sixteen Great War poets commemorated on a slate stone unveiled in Westminster Abbey's Poet's Corner. The inscription on the stone is taken from Owen's "Preface" to his poems: "My subject is War, and the pity of War. The Poetry is in the pity." There is also a small museum at the Craiglockhart War Hospital, now a Napier University building, containing the "War Poets Collection".

The forester's house in Ors where Owen spent his last night, Maison Forestière de l'Ermitage, has been transformed by Turner Prize nominee Simon Patterson into an art installation and permanent memorial to Owen and his poetry. It opened to the public on 1 October 2011.

In November 2015, actor Jason Isaacs unveiled a flagstone commemorating Owen at the former Craiglockhart War Hospital in Edinburgh where Owen was treated for shell shock during WWI.

=== Owen and his poetry in the media ===
Benjamin Britten's War Requiem, first performed in 1962, makes extensive use of Owen's poetry.

Owen himself has been the subject of several fictional works, notably Not About Heroes, a play about Owen's friendship with Siegfried Sassoon by Stephen MacDonald, first performed in 1982. The Regeneration Trilogy, a novel series by Pat Barker, includes the meeting and relationship between Sassoon and Owen and the death of Owen as one of its main themes.

=== Media portrayals ===
- Not About Heroes, 1982 play by Stephen MacDonald about friendship between Owen and Sassoon
- In the 1997 film, Regeneration, based on Pat Barker's novel of the same name, Owen is played by Stuart Bunce.
- Wilfred Owen: A Remembrance Tale, 2007 documentary with Owen played by Samuel Barnett
- Bullets and Daffodils, 2010 musical about Owen's life by Dean Johnson
- "The Piper", 2016 episode of podcast series The Magnus Archives
- The Burying Party, 2018 film with Owen played by Matthew Staite
- Benediction, 2021 film directed by Terence Davies with Owen played by Matthew Tennyson

=== Wilfred Owen Association ===
To commemorate Owen's life and poetry, The Wilfred Owen Association was formed in 1989. Since its formation the Association has established permanent public memorials in Shrewsbury and Oswestry. In addition to readings, talks, visits and performances, it promotes and encourages exhibitions, conferences, awareness and appreciation of Owen's poetry. Peter Owen, Wilfred Owen's nephew, was President of the Association until his death in July 2018. The Association's Patrons include Peter Florence, Rowan Williams Sir Daniel Day-Lewis and Samuel West; Grey Ruthven, 2nd Earl of Gowrie (1939–2021) was also a Patron. The Association presents a biennial Poetry Award to honour a poet for a sustained body of work that includes memorable war poems; previous recipients include Sir Andrew Motion (Poet Laureate 1999–2009), Dannie Abse, Christopher Logue, Gillian Clarke and Seamus Heaney. Owen Sheers was awarded the prize in September 2018.
