= Reconciliation (poem) =

1918 poem by Siegfried Sassoon

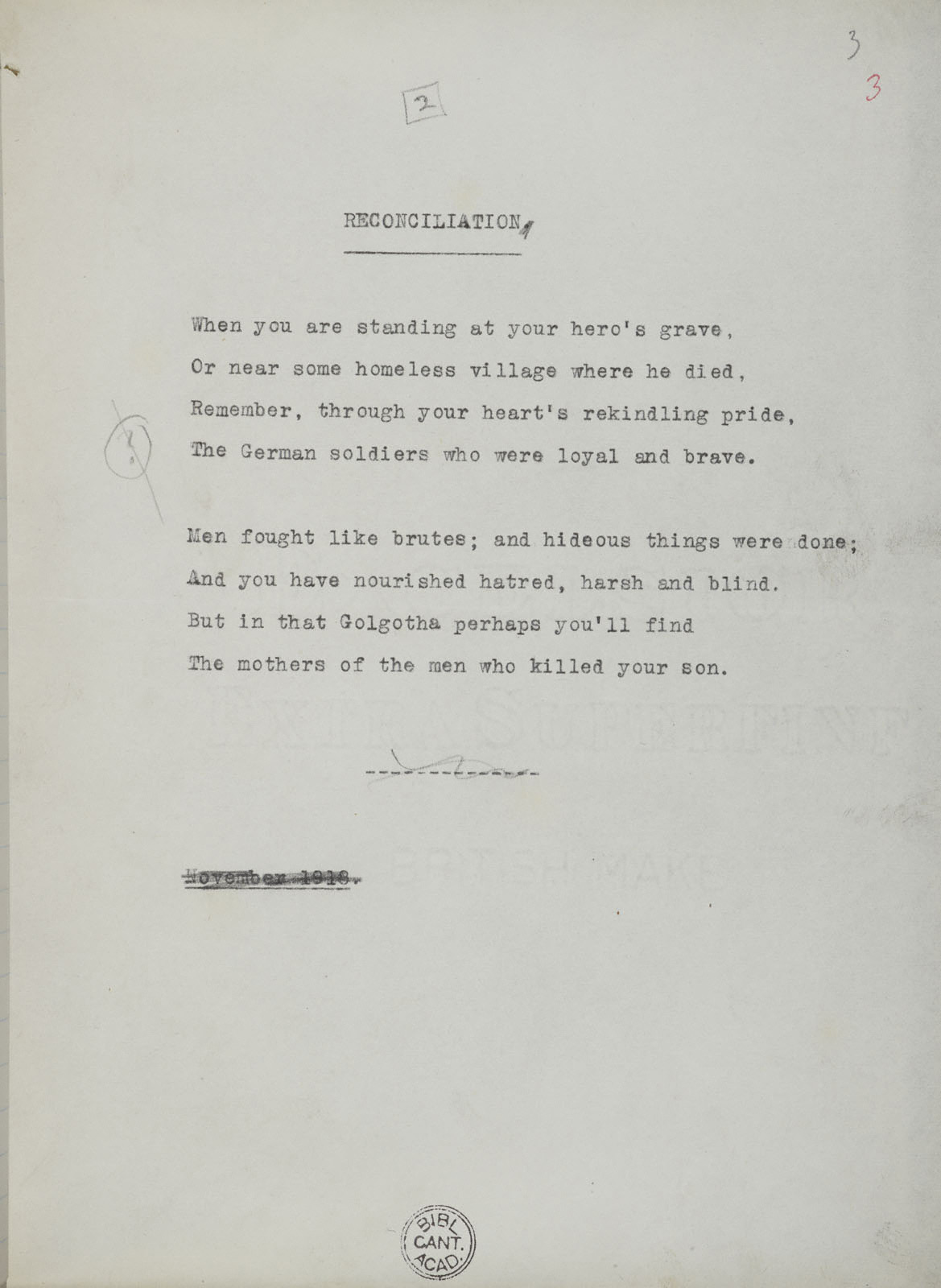
Sassoon's original typewritten poem

"Reconciliation" was a war poem by Siegfried Sassoon. Written in November 1918, around the time the Armistice was signed, and in response to it, it is notable for its sympathy towards German soldiers. Sassoon's major theme is that all victories in war are pyrrhic, where everybody—including the victors—suffering. The poem is addressed to German mothers, whose "heroes" were "loyal and brave"; while they "fought like brutes", suggests Sassoon, German motherhood "nourished hatred, harsh and blind". Critic Patrick Campbell has noted that the latter phrase may also be seen as a description of Sassoon's own war poetry, being "motivated and infused by anger". Campbell notes that, by 1917, such was the paranoia about the possible presence of spies in Britain that Sassoon knew his description of brave Germans was unpopular with the public. The poem has been described as "indicative of his response" to the increasing calls for vengeance and reparations that followed the Armistice.
