= W. H. R. Rivers bibliography =

Author bibliography

The following is a list of works by English anthropologist, neurologist, ethnologist and psychiatrist W. H. R. Rivers.

== 1888 ==
- A case of spasm of the muscles of the neck causing protrusion of the head (St. Bart's Hospital Reports, 24, pp. 249–51)

== 1889 ==
- Abstract of a paper on 'Delirium and its allied conditions', read before the Abernethian Society (St. Bart's Hospital Reports, 25, pp. 279–80)

== 1891 ==
- A case of treadler's cramp (Brain, 24, pp. 110–11)
- Abstract of paper on 'Hysteria', read before the Abernethian Society (St. Bart's Hospital Reports, 27, pp. 285–6)

== 1893 ==
- Abstract of paper on 'Neurasthenia', read before the Abernethian Society (St. Bart's Hospital Reports, 29, p. 350)

== 1894 ==
- A Modification of Aristotle's Experiment (Mind, New Series, Vol. 3, No. 12, Oct., 1894, pp. 583–584)
- Review of O. Külpe's 'Grundriss d. Psychologie auf experimenteller Grundlage dargestellt' (Mind, New Series, 3, pp. 413–17)

== 1895 ==
- Review of H. Maudsley's 'Pathology of Mind', and E. Kräpelin's 'Psychologische Arbeiten' (Mind, New Series, 4, pp. 400–3)
- Paper on 'Experimental psychology in relation to insanity', read before the Medico-Psychol. Soc. G.B & I. (Abstract in Lancet, 73, p. 867)
- Review of T. Zichen's 'Psychiatrie f. Aertze und Studierende' (Brain, 18, pp. 418–21)
- On binocular colour mixture (Proceedings of the Cambridge Philosophy Society, 8, pt. 5, pp. 273–7)
- On the apparent size of objects (Mind, New Series, Vol. 5, No. 17, Jan., 1896, pp. 71–80)

== 1896 ==
- 'Observations on mental fatigue and recovery', paper read before the Medico-Psychol. Soc. G.B & I. (Abstract in Lancet, 74, p. 711)
- On mental fatigue and recovery (Journal of Mental Science, 42, pp. 525–9)
- Über Ermüdung und Erholung, with E. Kräpelin (Psychol. Arbeit, 1, pp. 627–78)

== 1897 ==
- The photometry of coloured paper (Journal of Physiology, 22, pp. 137–45)

== 1899 ==
- Contributions to comparative psychology from the Torres Straits and New Guinea (Rep. Brit. Assoc., 1899, p. 486, and Journal of the Royal Anthropological Institute of Great Britain and Ireland, New Series, 2, pp. 219–222) (With W. McDougall and C.S Myers)
- Two new departures in anthropological method (Report of the British Association for the Advancement of Science, pp. 789–90)

== 1900 ==
- The senses of primitive man (Abstract in Science, New Series, 11, pp. 740–1, and trans. 'Über die Sinne d. primitiven Menschen'in Umschau, 25)
- 'Textbook of physiology', 6th ed. revd., Part IV., 'The Senses', by Sir M. Foster assisted by W. H. R. Rivers
- Article on 'Vision', in Schäfer's 'Text-book of physiology'
- A genealogical method of collecting social and vital statistics (Journal of the Royal Anthropological Institute of Great Britain and Ireland, 30, pp. 74–82)
- Report of Committee on mental and physical deviations from the normal among children in... schools (with others). (Rep. Brit. Ass., 1900, pp. 461–6)

== 1901 ==
- The measurement of visual illusion (Rep. Brit. Ass., 1901, p. 818)
- Reports of the Cambridge Anthropological Expedition to Torres Straits, Vol. II., Physiology and Psychology, pt. I., Introductory, and Visin, pp. vi., 140. Cambridge
- On erythropsia (Trans. Ophthal. Soc. Lond., XXI., pp. 296–305)
- Primitive orientation (Folk-Lore, XII., pp. 210–12)
- The colour vision of the Eskimo (Proc. Camb. Philos. Soc., XI., pp. 143–9)
- Primitive colour vision R. Inst. Lect. (Pop. Sci. Mthly., LIX., pp. 44–58)
- Review of W.A. Nagel's 'Farbensinn d. Tiere' (Brain, XXIV., pp. 663–4)
- Review of A. Lehmann's 'Körperliche Äusserungen psychischer Zustände' (Mind, N.S., X., pp. 402–4)
- The colour vision of the natives of Upper Egypt (J.A.I., XXXI., pp. 229–47)
- Colour vision: reviews of Holden and Bosse's 'The order of development of colour perception and of colour preference in the child' (Man, I., pp. 107–9)
- On the function of the maternal uncle in Torres Straits (Man, Vol. 1, 1901, pp. 171–172)
- On the functions of the son-in-law and brother-in-law in Torres Straits (Man, Vol. 1, 1901, p. 172)

== 1902 ==
- Report of Committee on pigmentation survey of the schoolchildren of Scotland (with others) (Rep. Brit. Assoc., 1902, pp. 352–3; 1903, p. 415)
- Note on the sister's son in Samoa (Folk-Lore, XIII., p. 199)

== 1903 ==
- Observations on the vision of the Uralis and Sholagas (Madras Govt. Mus. Bull., V., pp. 1–16)
- Toda Kinship and Marriage; the Toda dairy (Rep. Brit. Assoc., 1903, PP. 810–12)
- The psychology and sociology of the Todas and the tribes of Southern India (Rep. Brit. Assoc., LXXIII., pp. 415–16)
- The funeral of Sunerani (Eagle, XXIV., pp. 337–43)

== 1904 ==
- Reports of the Cambridge Anthropological Expedition to Torres Straits, Vol. V: Genealogical tables; Kinship; Totemism (with A.C Haddon); The regulation of marriage; Personal names
- Note on R. C. Punnett's 'On the proportion of the sexes among the Todas' (Proc. Camb. Philos. Soc., XII., pp. 487–8)
- Toda prayer (Folk-Lore, XV., pp. 166–81)
- Some funeral customs of the Todas; On the senses of the Todas *Rep. Brit. Assoc., 1904, PP. 726, 749-50)
- Investigations of the comparative visual acuity of savages and of civilised people (Br. Med. J., 1904, II., p. 1297)
- 'Acuité visuelle des peuples civillisées et des sauvages' (Ann. d'Oeul., CXXXII., pp. 455- )

== 1905 ==
- Observations on the senses of the Todas (Br. J. Psychol., I., pp. 321–96)
- The afferent nervous system from a new aspect; with H. Head and J. Sherren (Brain, XXVIII., pp. 99–115)

== 1906 ==
- The Todas. Map, illus., 22 cm. London
- Demonstration of new apparatus for psychological tests (Proc. Camb. Philos. Soc., XIII., p. 392)
- Report on the psychology and sociology of the Todas and other Indian tribes (Proc. Roy. Soc. B., 77, pp. 239–41)
- The astronomy of Torres Straits Islanders; A survival of twofold origin (Rep. Brit. Assoc., 1906, pp. 701–2)

== 1907 ==
- The marriage of cousins in India (J. R. Asiatic Soc., PP. 611–40)
- Report of a Sub-Committee appointed to advise on the publication of a new edition of 'Notes and Queries on Anthropology' (with others)
- The action of caffeine on the capacity for muscular work (Journ. Physiol., XXXVI., pp. 34–47)
- Review of Sex and Society by W. I. Thomas (Man, Vol. 7, 1907, pp. 111–111)
- On the origin of the classificatory system of relationships (Anthrop. Essays pres. to E.B Taylor, pp. 309–23. Oxford)
- Report of Committee on anthropometric investigation in the British Isles (with others) (Rep. Brit. Assoc., 1907, pp. 354–68)
- Morgan's Malayan system of relationship; Some sociological definitions (Rep. Brit. Assoc., LXXVII., p. 640, and pp. 653–5)
- Review of C.F Jayne's 'String Figures' (Folk-Lore, XVIII., pp. 112–16)

== 1908 ==
- Reports of the Cambridge Anthropological Expedition to Torres Straits, Vol. VI (Eastern Islanders): Genealogies; Kinship; Personal names; The regulation of marriage; Social organisation
- The influence on alcohol and other drugs on fatigue (Croonian Lects., R. Coll. Physicians, 1906). London: E. Arnold, pp. 144
- A human experiment in nerve division (with H. Head) (Brain, XXXI., pp. 323–450)
- The illusion of compared horizontal and vertical lines (with G.D. Hicks), and The influence of small doses of alcohol on the capacity for muscular work (with H.N. Webber) (Br. J. Psychol., II., pp. 252–5)

== 1909 ==
- Review of B. Thomson's 'The Fijians' (Folk-Lore, XX., pp. 252–5)
- 'Some notes on magical practices in the Banks' Islands,' a paper read before the Folklore Soc. (Folk-Lore, XXI., p. 2)
- Totemism in Polynesia and Melanesia (J.R.A.I, XXXIX., pp. 156–80)

== 1910 ==
- The genealogical method of anthropological inquiry (Sociol. Review, III, pp. 1–12)
- French translation of the above (Rev. d'Ethnogr. & de Sociol., Paris)
- The father's sister in Oceania (Folk-Lore, XXI., pp. 42–59)
- Report of Committee on establishment of a system of measuring mental characters (with others) (Rep. Brit. Assoc., 1910, p. 267)
- Kava-drinking in Melanesia (Rep. Brit. Assoc., 1910, p. 734)
- The Solomon Island basket (with Mrs. A. H. Quiggin) (Man, X., pp. 161–3)

== 1911 ==
- The ethnological analysis of culture (Pres. Address to Section H. Brit. Assoc.) (Science, XXXIV., pp. 385–97; Rep. Brit. Assoc., 1911, pp. 490–9; Nature, LXXXVII., p. 356)
- Report of Committee on mental and physical factors involved in education (with others) (Rep. Brit. Assoc., 1911, pp. 177–214; 1912, pp. 327–38; 1913, pp. 302–5)

== 1912 ==
- Reports of the Cambridge Anthropological Expedition to Torres Straits, Vol. IV. Astronomy
- The disappearance of useful arts (Rep. Brit. Assoc., 1912, pp. 598–9)
- Island names in Melanesia (Geog. Jorn., pp. 458–68)
- Conventionalism in primitive art (Rep. Brit. Assoc., 1912, p. 599)
- The sociological significance of myth (Folk-Lore, XXIII., pp. 307–331)
- The primitive conception of death (Hibbert J., X., pp. 393–407)
- Obituary notice of Andrew Lang (Folk-Lore, XXIII., pp. 367–71)
- Articles on Methodology, Marriage, Relationship, Property and Inheritance in Part III., Sociology, of 'Notes and Queries on Anthropology,' 4th ed.

== 1913 ==
- Survival in sociology (Sociol. Rev., VI., pp. 293–305)
- Report on anthropological research outside America (Carnegie Inst. of Washington Publications., 200)
- A gypsy pedigree and its lessons (with G. Hall) (Rep. Brit. Assoc., 1913, p. 625)
- Massage in Melanesia (paper read at the 17th Internat. Congress of Medicine, sect. xxiii., pp. 39–42. Lond.)
- The bow in New Ireland (Man. XIII., p. 54)
- The contact of peoples (essays to W. Ridgeway, pp. 474–92. Cambridge)
- Sun-cult and megaliths in Oceania; R. Inst. lect. (Rep. Brit. Assoc., 1913, p. 634, and Amer. Anthrop., N.S., XVII., pp. 431–45)

== 1914 ==
- Notes on the Heron pedigree (Gypsy Lore Soc., VII., 88-104)
- The History of Melanesian Society (Percy Sladen Trust Expedition to Melanesia, 2 vols. Cambridge)
- Kinship and social organisation (Studies in Economic and Political Science, No. 36)
- Kin, Kinship (Hastings' Encyclopedia of Religion and Ethics, VII., pp. 700–7)
- Is Australian culture simple or complex? Gerontocracy and marriage in Australia (Rep. Brit. Assoc., 1914, pp. 529–32)

== 1915 ==
- Descent and ceremonial in Ambrim (J.R.A.I., XLV., pp. 229–33)
- Review of Prof. G. Elliot Smith's 'The migrations of early culture' (J. Egyptian Archaeol., II, pp. 256–7)
- The boomerang in the New Hebrides (Man, Vol. 15, 1915, pp. 106–108)
- Melanesian gerontocracy (Man, XV., pp. 145–7)
- Marriage (Introductory and Primitive); Mother-right (in Hastings' 'Enc. Religion and Ethics,' VIII., pp. 423–32, 851-9)

== 1916 ==
- Medicine, Magic and Religion- book published 1923 (Fitzpatrick Lects. 1915) (originally published in stages. Lancet XCIV., pp. 59–65, 117-23)
- Irrigation and the cultivation of taro (Nature, XCVII., p. 514, and Abst. in Manchester Lit. and Phil. Soc. Mem. and Proc., LX., pp. xliv.-v., 1917)
- Sociology and psychology (Sociol. Rev., IX., pp. 1–13)

== 1917 ==
- Freud's psychology of the unconscious. Paper read at the Edinburgh Pathological Club, Mar. 7, 1917 (Lancet, XCV., pp. 912–14)
- A case of claustrophobia (Lancet, XCV., pp. 237–40)
- Medicine, Magic and Religion (Lancet, XCV., pp. 919–23, 959-64)
- New Britain, New Ireland, New Caledonia, New Hebrides (Hastings' 'Enc. Religion and Ethics,' IX., pp. 336–9, 352-5)
- Dreams and primitive culture (Bull. J, Rylands Library, IV)
- The government of subject peoples ('Science and the Nation,' ed. A.C Seward, pp. 302–328)

== 1918 ==
- The Repression of War Experience (Lancet, XCVI., pp. 513–33)
- Maori burial chests (Man, XCIII., p. 97)
- Why is the 'unconscious' unconscious? (Br. J. Psychol., IX., pt. 2, pp. 236–46)

== 1919 ==
- Psychology and medicine (Pres. Address Medical Section, Brit. Psychol. Soc.) (Lancet, XCVII., pp. 889–92)
- Mind and medicine (Bull. J. Rylands Library, V.)
- Psychiatry and the War (Science, New Series, Vol. 49, No. 1268 (Apr. 18, 1919), pp. 367–369)
- Review of C. Wissler's 'The American Indian' (Man, XIX, pp. 75–6)
- Psychology and the War; Pres. address to Brit. Assoc., Sub-Section Psychology (Rep. Brit. Assoc., 1919, p. 313)

== 1920 ==
- Studies in neurology (with H. Head and others) Oxford Medical publns. 2 vols.
- Anthropology and the missionary (Church Missionary Review, Sept.)
- Instinct and the Unconscious 1st edit. Cambridge
- The dying out of native races; Lect. at R. Inst. Public Health, May, 1918(Lancet, 98, pp. 42–4, 109-11)
- The concept of soul-substance in New Guinea and Melanesia (Folklore, 31, pp. 48–69)
- Freud's conception of the censorship (Psycho-analytic Revue, 7, p. 3)
- History and ethnology (History, New Series, 5, pp. 65–80)
- Ships and boats; Solomon Islands (Hastings' Enc. Religion and Ethics, 11, pp. 471–4, 680-5)
- Review of Mrs. Scoresby Routledge's 'The mystery of Easter Island' (Folklore, XXXI., pp. 82–7)
- Review of R.H Lowie's 'primitive society' (American Anthropologist, XXII., pp. 278–83)
- The statues of Easter Island (Folklore, 31, pp. 294–306)
- Instinct and the unconscious (British Journal of Psychology, 10, pp. 1–7)
- Psychology and medicine (British Journal of Psychology, 10, pp. 183–93)

== 1921 ==
- The origin of hypergamy (J. Bihar and Orissa Research Soc., Patna, 7, pp. 9–24)
- Conservatism and plasticity; Pres. Address to the Folk-Lore Soc. (Folklore, 32, pp. 10–27)
- Affect in the dream (British Journal of Psychology, 12, pp. 113–24)
- Kinship and marriage in India (Man in India, 1, pp. 6–10)
- The Todas (Hastings' 'Encyc, Religion and Ethics,' 12., pp. 354–7)

== 1922 ==
- Instinct and the unconscious. 2nd edit. Cambridge
- Psycho-neurotic symptoms associated with miners' nystagmus (Medical Research Council: Special Report Series, 65, pp. 60–64)
- Methods of dream analysis (British Journal of Psychology, Medical Section II., pt. 2, pp. 101–108)
- The symbolism of rebirth; Pres. Address to Folk-Lore Soc. (Folklore, 33, pp. 14–33)

== 1922 (posthumous) ==
- The psychological factor (Essays on the depopulation of Melanesia, ed. W.H.R.R., pp. 83- Cambridge)
- History and Ethnology, with bibliography (Helps for Students of History, No. 48, S.P.C.K., Lond.)
- The relation of complex and sentiment (British Journal of Psychology, 13)

== 1923 ==
- Conflict and Dream|Conflict and Dream (edit. G. Elliot Smith). London
- Psychology and Politics (edit. G. Elliot Smith). London

== 1924 ==
- Social Organisation (edit. by W. J. Perry). London

== 1926 ==
- Psychology and Ethnology (edit. G. Elliot Smith). London
