= Notes and Queries on Anthropology =

British ethnographic manual

Notes and Queries on Anthropology is an ethnographic manual (questionnaire) by the Royal Anthropological Institute of Great Britain and Ireland, first published in 1874 under the title Notes and Queries on Anthropology, for the Use of Travellers and Residents in Uncivilized Lands. The development of field methods in British anthropology is reflected in the successive editions, the sixth and last of which appeared in 1951.

Notes and Queries on Anthropology, for the Use of Travellers and Residents in Uncivilized Lands (first edition, 1874)

Notes and Queries on Anthropology (third edition, 1899)

== Introduction ==
The influential ethnographic manual was designed to encourage accurate anthropological observations from travellers and non-specialists alike. The first manual contained a detailed questionnaire—divided in 100 sections with many sub-sections each—"designed to standardise the collection of ethnographic data across the British Empire". The object of the work was according to the preface of the first edition "to promote accurate anthropological observation on the part of travellers, and to enable those who are not anthropologists themselves to supply the information which is wanted for the scientific study of anthropology at home". The work borrows its title from Notes and Queries, a periodical focused on antiquarian and literary topics first published in London in 1849.

The dominant intellectual role in the formation of the questionnaire of 1874 played the anthropologist Edward Burnett Tylor (1832–1917), the author of Primitive Culture (1871) and (later) Anthropology: An Introduction to the Study of Man and Civilization (1881).

The work targeted colonial officials, missionaries, and others in contact with indigenous cultures. It contains systematic questions on language, religion, social organisation, and material culture. The first edition appeared 1874, subsequent editions in 1892, 1899, 1912, 1929, and 1951 (with the sixth edition revised by an institute committee). Notes and Queries served as an early model for standardised ethnographic fieldwork. It helped create a framework for collecting comparable data across different societies. The handbook influenced the methodology and professionalisation of anthropology in the late 19th and early 20th centuries. Today, it is recognised as a key historical resource for understanding the development of anthropological research.

== First edition (1874) ==
The three parts and their contributors were:

Part I. Constitution of Man: John Beddoe, Charles Darwin
Part II. Culture: Edward Burnett Tylor, A. Lane Fox (Pitt Rivers), Francis Galton, Barnard Davis, A. W. Franks, E. Brabrook, Hyde Clarke, H. Howorth, John Beddoe, John Lubbock, George Busk, John Evans, Carl Engel
Part III. Miscelleaneous: T. Gore Browne, Barnard Davis, Francis Galton

All three parts of the first edition (1874) were contributed to by proponents of racial theory and scientific racism, such as John Beddoe (1826–1911, a founder of the Ethnological Society and president of the Anthropological Institute from 1889 to 1891) and Francis Galton (1822–1911, a pioneer of eugenics).

== Sixth edition (1951) ==
At the beginning of the sixth edition, a List of Committees names three committees involved in its preparation: the General Committee (British Association for the Advancement of Science, Section H), the Sub-Committee on Sociology (British Association for the Advancement of Science, Section H), and the Committee of the Royal Anthropological Institute for the publication of Notes and Queries on Anthropology (Sixth Edition). Members of the various committees included H. J. Fleure, W. E. Le Gros Clark, E. E. Evans-Pritchard, D. Forde, J. H. Hutton, A. R. Radcliffe-Brown, R. Firth, M. Fortes, John L. Myres, and, Brenda Z. Seligman, who also wrote the preface.

== Citation ==
The Anthropological Institute has been equally regardful of the needs of the observer. It has just issued ... the second edition of "Notes and Queries on Anthropology" which was first published in 1874 under plans laid down by General Pitt Rivers. The division which he adopted under the two heads of Constitution of Man and Culture now takes the form of Anthropography and Ethnography. ... In this branch of work we have the advantage of the accumulated experience of the Anthropometric Committee and of Mr Galton's anthropometric laboratory ... (Brabrook, 1893 [a]: 270-1)

== Editions ==
- 1874 – First edition, Notes and Queries on Anthropology, for the Use of Travellers and Residents in Uncivilized Lands. Edward Stanford, Charing Cross, London 1874
- 1892 – Second edition, edited for the Council of the Anthropological Institute by John George Garson and Sir Charles Hercules Read. Online
- 1899 – Third edition, edited for the British Association for the Advancement of Science by John George Garson and Sir Charles Hercules Read. Online
- 1912 – Fourth edition (in partial view)
- 1929 – Fifth edition, edited for the British Association for the Advancement of Science by a Committee of Section II. Internet Archive
- 1951 – Sixth edition, revised and rewritten by a committee of the Royal Anthropological Institute of Great Britain and Ireland, edited by Brenda Z. Seligman, published by Routledge & Kegan Paul Ltd. Royal Anthropological Institute. Online - Review (in partial view)

== Bibliography ==
- James Urry: "Notes and Queries on Anthropology" and the Development of Field Methods in British Anthropology, 1870–1920. Proceedings of the Royal Anthropological Institute of Great Britain and Ireland, No. 1972 (1972), pp. 45–57. Published By: Royal Anthropological Institute of Great Britain and Ireland (in partial vew)
