= Sidney Herbert Ray =

British linguist (1858–1939)

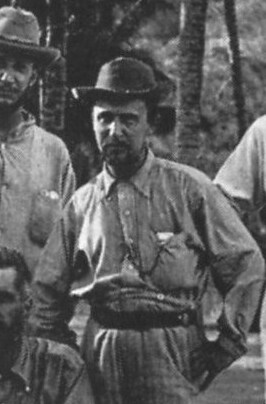
- Ray during the Torres Straits Expedition (1898)
- Born: 28 May 1858; London, United Kingdom
- Died: 1 January 1939 (aged 80); Rochford, United Kingdom
- Known for: Contributions to Melanesian linguistics
- Spouse: Eliza Rebecca Byrne (m. 1887, died) Ethyl Veryard (m. 1933)

Academic background
- Education: St. Mark's Training College

Sidney Herbert Ray (28 May 1858 – 1 January 1939) was a British comparative and descriptive linguist who specialised in Melanesian languages.

== Biography ==
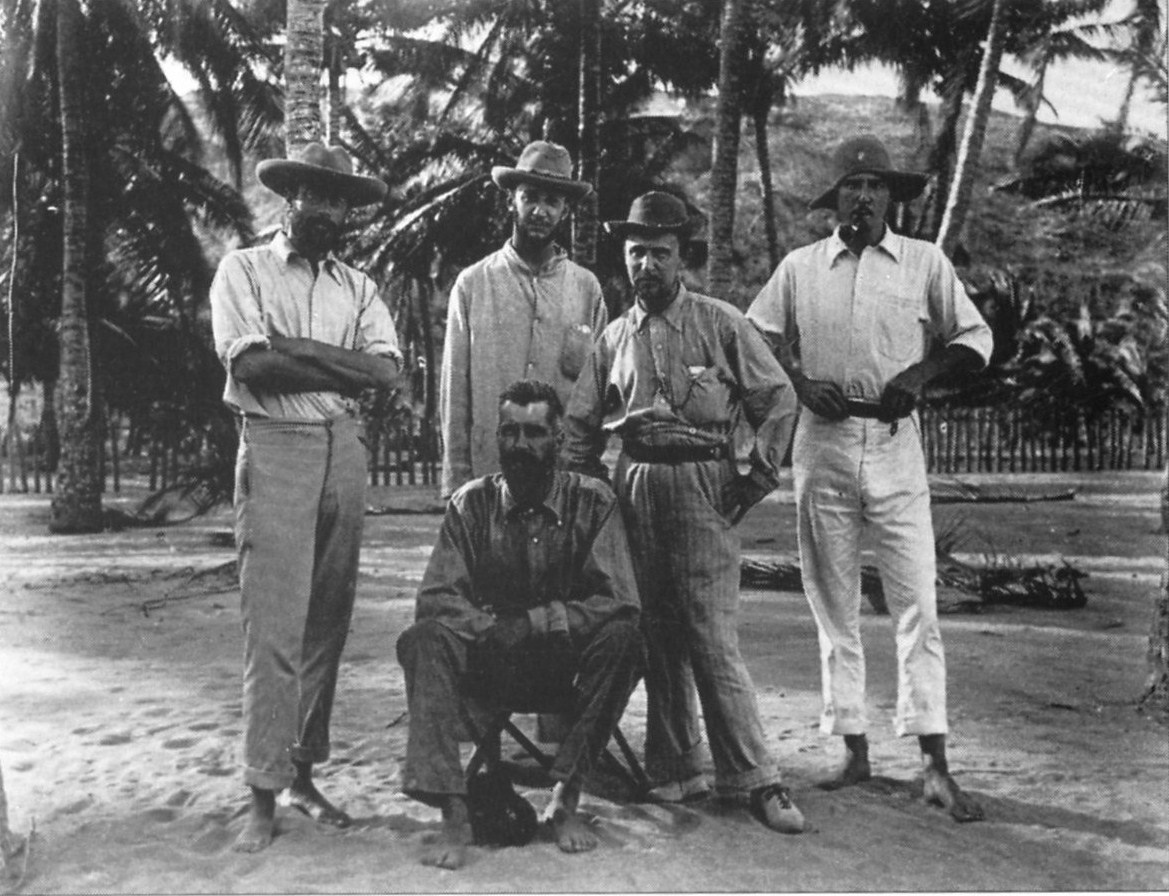
Members of the 1898 Cambridge Anthropological Expedition to Torres Straits. Standing (from left to right): W. H. R. Rivers, Charles Gabriel Seligman, Ray, Anthony Wilkin. Seated: Alfred Cort Haddon

In 1892, he read an important paper, The Languages of British New Guinea, to the Ninth International Congress of Orientalists. In that paper, he established the distinction between the Austronesian and Papuan languages of New Guinea. Although he never held an academic position, and was employed throughout his working life as a school teacher, S. H. Ray was an energetic fieldworker, and participated in a number of expeditions.

His first fieldwork was carried out as part of A. C. Haddon's 1898 Torres Straits Expedition along with W. H. R. Rivers, C. G. Seligman and Anthony Wilkin. At the time Ray was a primary school teacher, who had already made a study of two Torres Straits languages on the basis of missionary publications and data supplied by Haddon.

== Selected works ==
- Ray, Sidney Herbert (1892). "The languages of British New Guinea". Transactions of the Ninth International Congress of Orientalists. II (1892): 754–770.
- Ray, Sidney Herbert (1926). A Comparative Study of the Melanesian Island Languages. Cambridge: Cambridge University Press. pp. xvi+598. ISBN 9781107682023.

=== Archives ===
The papers of Sidney Herbert Ray (PP MS 3) are held at SOAS Archives
