= Cambridge Anthropological Expedition to Torres Straits =

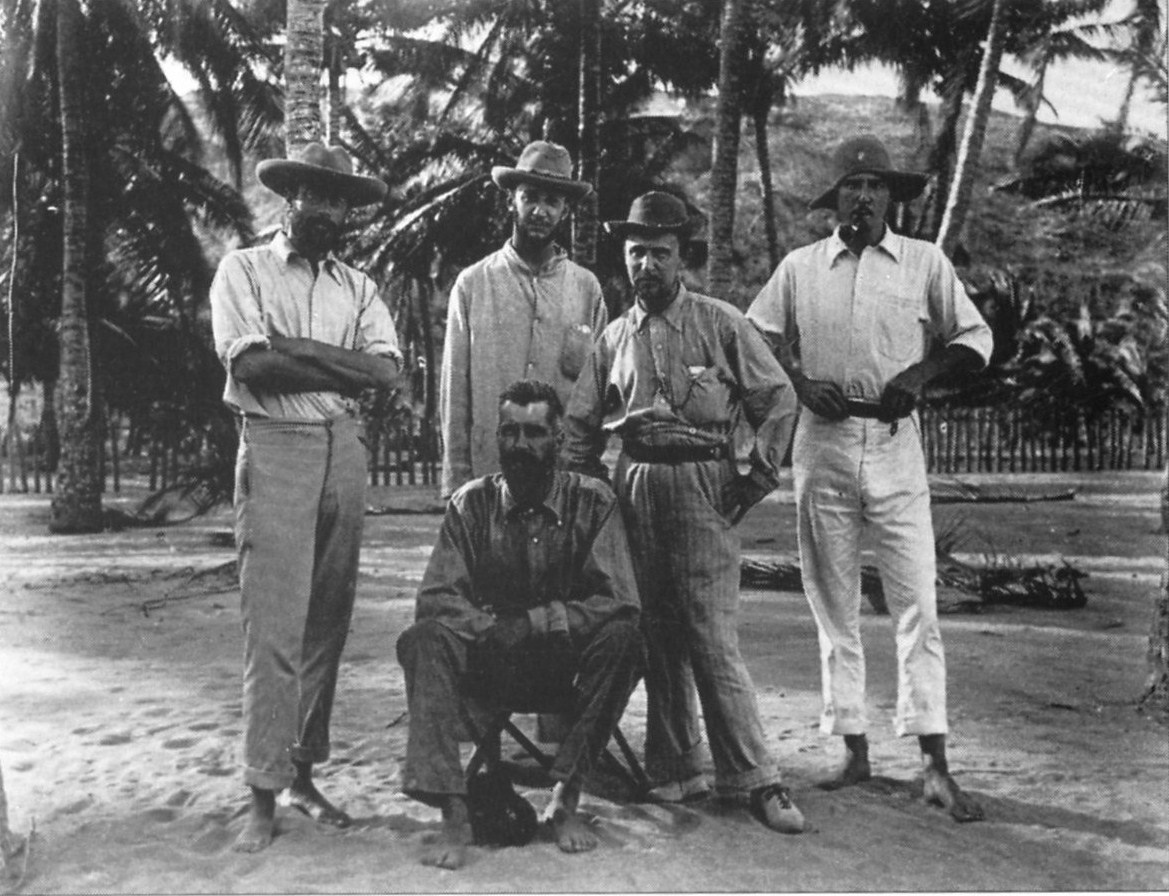
Members of the 1898 Torres Straits Expedition. Standing (from left to right): W. H. R. Rivers, Charles Gabriel Seligman, Ray, Anthony Wilkin. Seated: Alfred Cort Haddon

The Cambridge Anthropological Expedition to Torres Straits was an expedition organized by Alfred Cort Haddon in 1898-1899 to Torres Strait Island, New Guinea, and Sarawak. Besides Haddon, the participants were William Halse Rivers Rivers, Charles Samuel Myers, William McDougall, Sidney Herbert Ray, Anthony Wilkin, Charles Gabriel Seligman. Before the expedition, Haddon visited the region in 1888. They collected wax cylinder recordings, and shot several short films, depicting "the spectacular Malu-Bomai ceremony performed by the Torres Strait Islander men of Mer at Kiam".

Haddon persuaded Rivers to join him on the expedition. Rivers's first reaction was to decline, but he soon agreed on learning that C. S. Myers and William McDougall, two of his best former students, would participate. The other members were Sidney Ray, C. G. Seligman, and a young Cambridge graduate named Anthony Wilkin, who was asked to accompany the expedition as photographer. In April 1898, the Europeans were transported with gear and apparatus to the Torres Straits. Rivers was said to pack only a small handbag of personal effects for such field trips.

In April 1898, the expedition arrived at its field of work and spent over a year in the Torres Strait Islands, and Borneo. From Thursday Island, several of the party found passage, soaked by rain and waves, on the deck of a crowded 47-foot ketch. In addition to sea sickness, Rivers had been badly sunburnt on his shins and for many days had been quite ill. On 5 May, in a bad storm nearing their first destination of Murray Island, the ship dragged anchor on the Barrier Reef and the expedition almost met disaster

When the ketch dropped anchor, Rivers and Ray were at first too ill to go ashore. However the others set up a surgery to treat the native islanders and Rivers, lying in bed next-door tested the patients for colour vision: Haddon's diary noted "He is getting some interesting results." The warmth shown to the sickly Rivers by the Islanders contributed to strong positive feelings for the work and a deep concern for the welfare of Melanesians during the remainder of his life.

Rivers's first task was to examine the colour vision of the islanders and compare it to that of Europeans. In the course of his examinations of the visual acuity of the natives, Rivers showed that colour-blindness did not exist or was very rare, but that the colour vision of Papuans was not the same type as that of Europeans; they possessed no word for blue, and an intelligent native found nothing unnatural in applying the same name to the brilliant blue sea or sky and to the deepest black.

The expedition brought home a large collection of ethnographical specimens, some of which are now in the British Museum, but the bulk of them are in the Museum of Archaeology and Anthropology, University of Cambridge. The University of Cambridge later passed the wax cylinder recordings to the British Library. The main results of the expedition are published in The Reports of the Cambridge Expedition to Torres Straits. In 1916, Sir Arthur Keith stated in an address to the Royal Anthropological Institute, that the expedition had engendered "the most progressive and profitable movement in the history of British anthropology."

== Reports of the Cambridge Anthropological Expedition to the Torres Straits ==
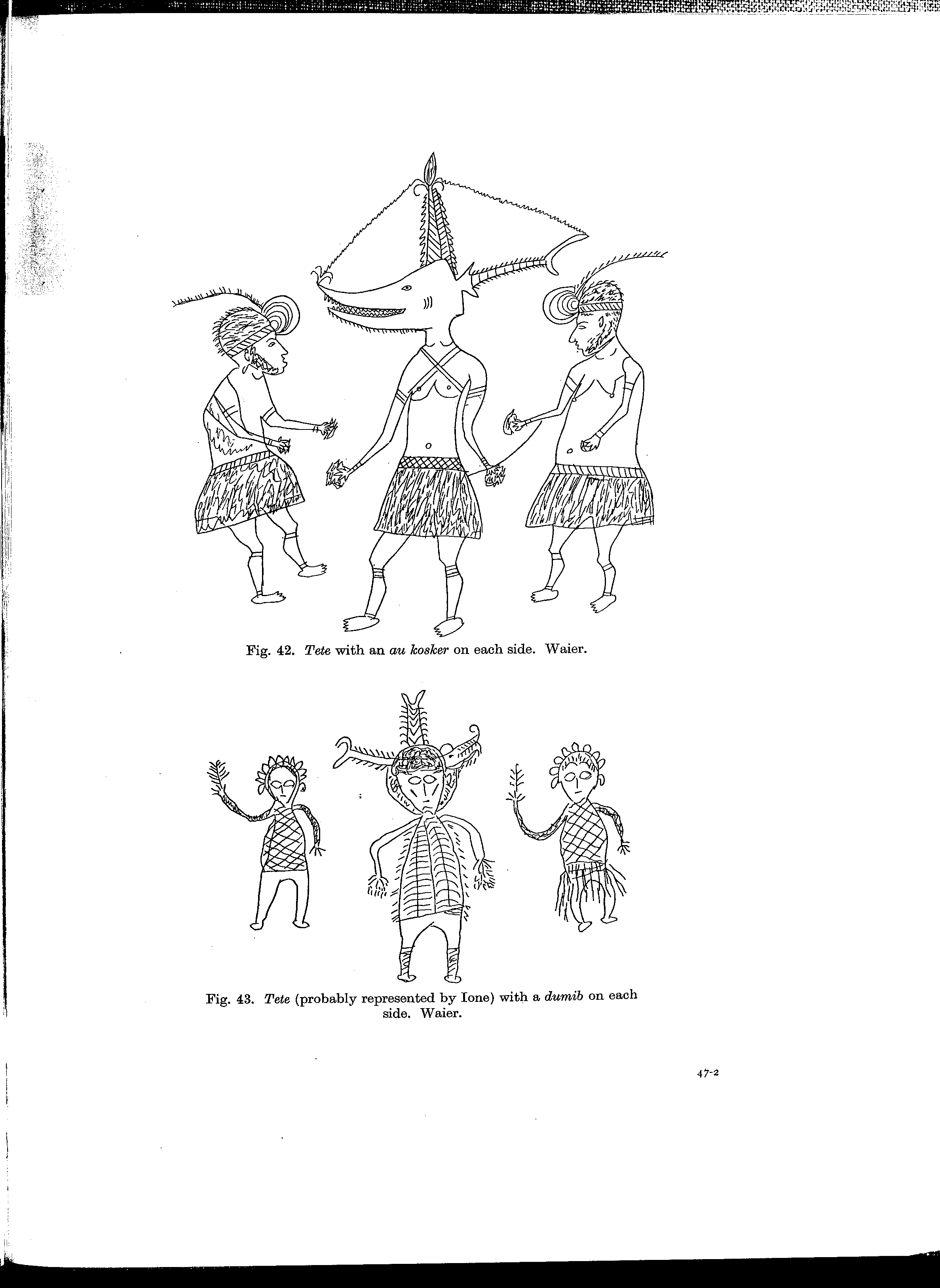
Illustrations from the Volume 1 of the Reports

- Reports of the Cambridge Anthropological Expedition to the Torres Straits. Cambridge University Press. LCCN 36006535. (6 volumes published from 1901 to 1935)
  - Volume I. General Ethnography.
  - Volume II. Physiology and Psychology. 1901.
  - Haddon, A. C.; Ray, Sidney H. (17 February 2011). Volume III. Linguistics. Cambridge University Press. ISBN 9780521179874.
  - Volume IV. Arts and Crafts.
  - Volume V. Sociology, Magic and Religion of the Western Islanders. Cambridge, University Press.
  - Haddon, Alfred Cort (1908). Volume VI. Sociology, Magic and Religion of the Eastern Islanders.
