= Charles Samuel Myers =

English physician (1873–1946)

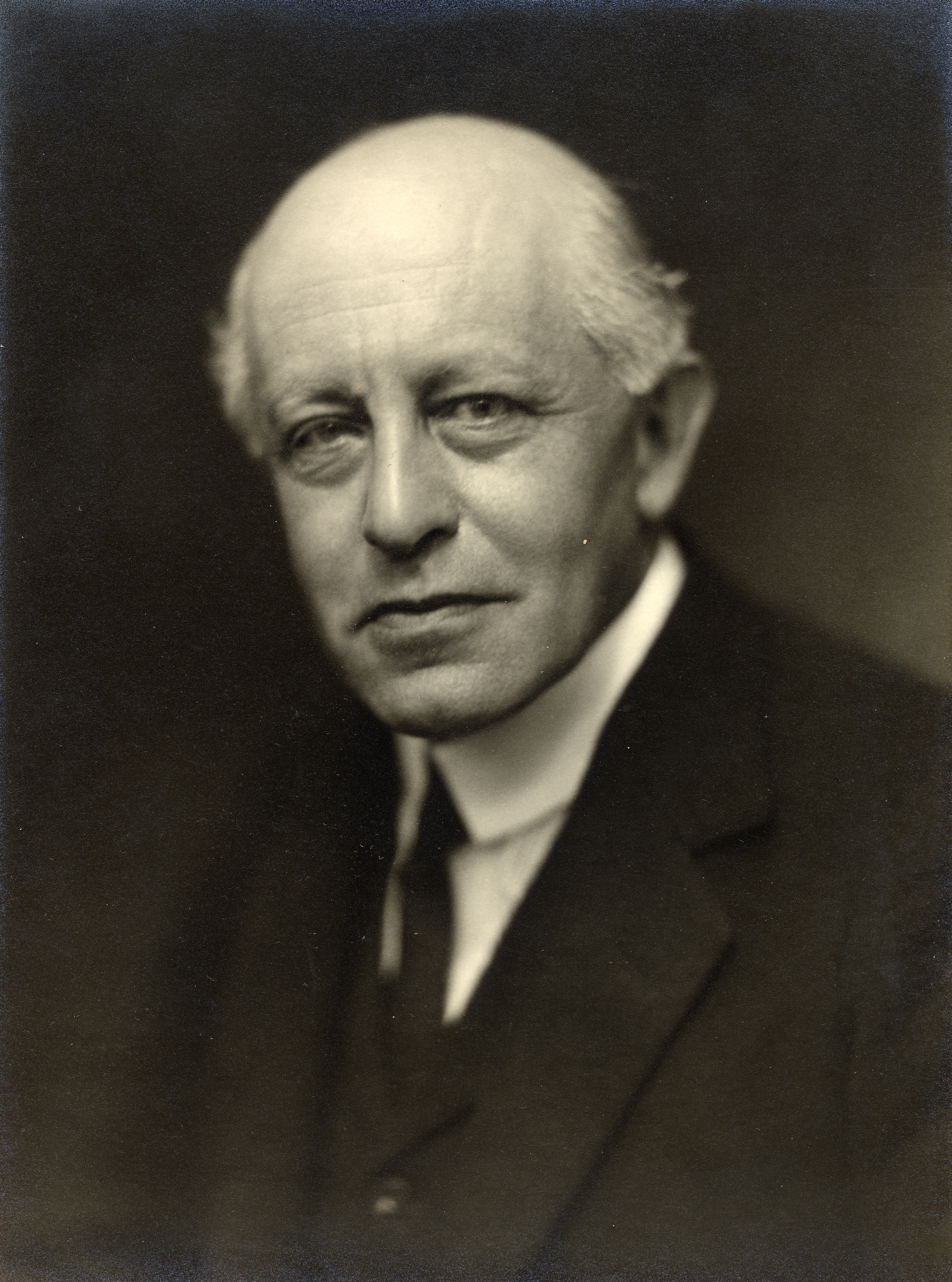
- Charles Samuel Myers c. 1920
- Born: 13 March 1873; Kensington, London, England
- Died: 12 October 1946 (aged 73); Winsford, Somerset, England
- Occupations: Physician and psychologist
- Spouse: Edith Babette Seligman

Charles Samuel Myers, CBE, FRS (13 March 1873 – 12 October 1946) was an English physician who worked as a psychologist, most notably with the British Royal Army Medical Corps during the First World War. Although he did not invent the term, his first academic paper, published by The Lancet in 1915, concerned shell shock. In 1921 he was co-founder of the National Institute of Industrial Psychology.

== Biography ==
=== Family background ===
Myers was born in Kensington, London on 13 March 1873, the eldest son of Wolf Myers, a merchant, and his wife, Esther Eugenie Moses. His family was Jewish. In the 1881 census he is an 8-year-old scholar living at 27 Arundel Gardens, Kensington, London with his parents, 4 brothers and 4 servants.

In the 1891 census he was a scholar, aged 18 living at 49 Leinster Gardens, Paddington, London, with his parents, 4 brothers, a visitor, and 4 servants (cook, housemaid, parlourmaid, and ladies' maid).

=== Education ===
He attended the City of London School where he studied sciences. Of this experience he wrote:

My science master at school knew little biology and less physiology, and in the private tuition which he gave me I used to find him reading my textbook in physiology [Michael Foster's] so as to keep just ahead of me. I left school in 1890 and joined a year's course in elementary biology, chemistry, and physics at St. Bartholomew's Hospital. Thus, hurriedly and poorly equipped, I gained an entrance exhibition, and soon after a foundation scholarship at Caius.

— C. A. Murchison (ed.), "Charles Samuel Myers", 1961

He attended Gonville and Caius College, Cambridge, where he took a first in each part of the Natural Sciences tripos (1893 and 1895). He was Arnold Gerstenberg student in 1896 (this fund was set up in 1892 for the promotion of the study of Moral Philosophy and Metaphysics among students of Natural Sciences), and received the degree Doctor in Medicine from Gonville and Caius in October 1901. He also trained at St Bartholomew's Hospital in London. It was at Cambridge where he joined Freemasonry and was initiated Isaac Newton University Lodge.

=== Travels and study of ethnic music ===
In 1898 he joined W. H. R. Rivers and William McDougall on the Cambridge Anthropological Expedition to Torres Straits organised by Alfred Cort Haddon to the Torres Straits and Sarawak. Here he studied ethnic music, carrying out research on rhythm in Borneo. In 1906 he contributed an appendix entitled "Traces of African Melody in Jamaica" to the book Jamaican Song and Story by Walter Jekyll.

=== Early career ===
Between 1901 and 1902 Myers was involved in the collection of anthropometric measurements of Egyptians.

On his return to England he was appointed house physician at St Bartholomew's. In 1902 he returned to Cambridge to help Rivers teach the physiology of the special senses.

In 1904 Myers married Edith Babette, youngest daughter of Isaac Seligman, a merchant in London; they had three daughters and two sons, including the army intelligence officer Eddie Myers. Myers remained in Cambridge to become, in succession, demonstrator, lecturer, and, in 1921, reader in experimental psychology. From 1906 to 1909 he was also professor in experimental psychology at London University.

In 1909, when W.H.R. Rivers resigned a part of his Lectureship, Myers became the first lecturer at Cambridge University whose whole duty was to teach experimental psychology. For this he received a stipend of £50 a year. He held this position until 1930.

From 1911 Myers co-edited the British Journal of Psychology with Rivers. In 1914 he took over as sole editor, continuing in this post until 1924.

In 1912, Myers used his enthusiasm and ability to raise funds to establish the first English laboratory especially designed for experimental psychology at Cambridge. He became the laboratory's first Director and held this position until 1930. (The Cambridge Laboratory of Experimental Psychology).

=== First World War ===
In 1915 Myers was given a commission in the Royal Army Medical Corps and in 1916 he was appointed consultant psychologist to the British armies in France with a staff of assistants at Le Touquet. In 1915 Myers was the first to use the term "shell shock" in an article in The Lancet, a condition which he summarized as, "a punch on the head without any pain after it." He later acknowledged in 1940 that he did not invent the term. He tried to save shell-shocked soldiers from execution.

During his time in the military, he became frustrated with opposition to his views, particularly the view that shell-shock was a treatable condition. His superiors believed that shell shock was cowardice, and an attempt at deserting, rather than a legitimate psychological condition. His efforts have been called "a pioneering but frustrating struggle to get psychological evidence and applied psychology accepted" He was so upset by the rejection of his ideas by the military authorities that he refused to give evidence to the Southborough Committee on shell-shock because, as he wrote in 1940, "the recall of my past five years' work proved too painful for me."

In the last year of the war he devised tests and supervised their application for the selection of men suited to hydrophone work for detecting enemy submarines.

=== Postwar career ===
After the war, Myers returned to his Cambridge position. But here too he was deeply dissatisfied, wanting wider opportunities for the development of his more practical interests, and feeling that official and academic circles showed little genuine interest in psychology. From 1922 Myers devoted himself to the development of the National Institute of Industrial Psychology (NIIP) which he had founded with Henry John Welch in 1921. He was also involved in what became the Industrial Health Research Board.

He attended the Second Congress of the International Industrial Relations Institute held at Girton College, Cambridge in 1928.

When on the advisory committee on personnel selection was set up by the War Office, he was appointed a member. He delivered the Bradshaw Lecture at the Royal College of Physicians in 1933 on "A Psychological Regard for Medical Education".

He died at his home in Winsford, near Minehead, Somerset in 1946.

The Charles Myers Library was set up by the National Institute of Industrial Psychology and is currently incorporated into the Wellcome Library Girton College, Cambridge in June 1928.

=== Myers and the British Psychological Society ===
Myers was an early member of The Psychological Society, founded in 1901, which would later become the British Psychological Society in 1906. In January 1904, Myers became the first Secretary of the Society. In 1919 Myers suggested that membership should be opened up to "all those interested in various branches of psychology".

He was elected as the first President of the Society, following its enlargement and held this position between 1920 and 1923.

In 1920, Myers represented the BPS on the board of management of a new journal, Discovery, which dealt with the recent advances in scientific knowledge. Myers was also the Society's representative on the committee formed to consider a memorial to the W. H. R. Rivers. A fund was raised for the furtherance of the sciences to which Rivers had been interested, in particular anthropology and psychology.

== Published works ==
=== Psychology ===
- Text-Book of Experimental Psychology (1909) Read 1911 version online.
- Introduction to Experimental Psychology (1911) went through several editions.
- Present-day applications of Psychology (1919). Methuen. Read online
- Mind and work, the psychological factors in industry and commerce (1920), University of London Press
- Mind and work (1921) G.P. Putman's sons
- Industrial Psychology in Great Britain (1926) J Cape Ltd.
- Industrial Psychology (1929) T. Butterworth ltd.
- Psychological conceptions in other sciences (1929) Clarendon Press.
- Ten Years of Industrial Psychology (with H. J. Welch, 1932)
- The absurdity of any mind-body relation (1932) Oxford University Press, H. Milford Series: L.T. Hobhouse memorial trust lectures, no. 2
- A Psychologist's Point of View (1933)
- In the Realm of Mind (1937). The University Press.

=== Anthropology (Ethnic music) ===
- Myers, C.S. (1904). "A study of rhythm in primitive peoples". British Journal of Psychology. 1 (4): 397. doi:10.1111/j.2044-8295.1905.tb00165.x.

== Accolades ==
In 1915 Myers was elected FRS; he was appointed CBE in 1919, and received honorary degrees from the universities of Manchester (DSc, 1927), Calcutta (LLD), and Pennsylvania (DSc). He was a fellow (1919) and later an honorary fellow (1935) of Gonville and Caius College, Cambridge, a foreign associate of the French Société de Psychologie, twice president of the psychology section of the British Association (1922, 1931), president of the International Congress of Psychology in 1923, and editor of the British Journal of Psychology (1911–24).

== See also ==
- Combat stress reaction

== Bibliography ==
- Rose, Nikolas, Governing the Soul: The Shaping of the Private Self, London, Free Associated Books, (2nd ed), 1999.
