= Marian Smith =

American anthropologist

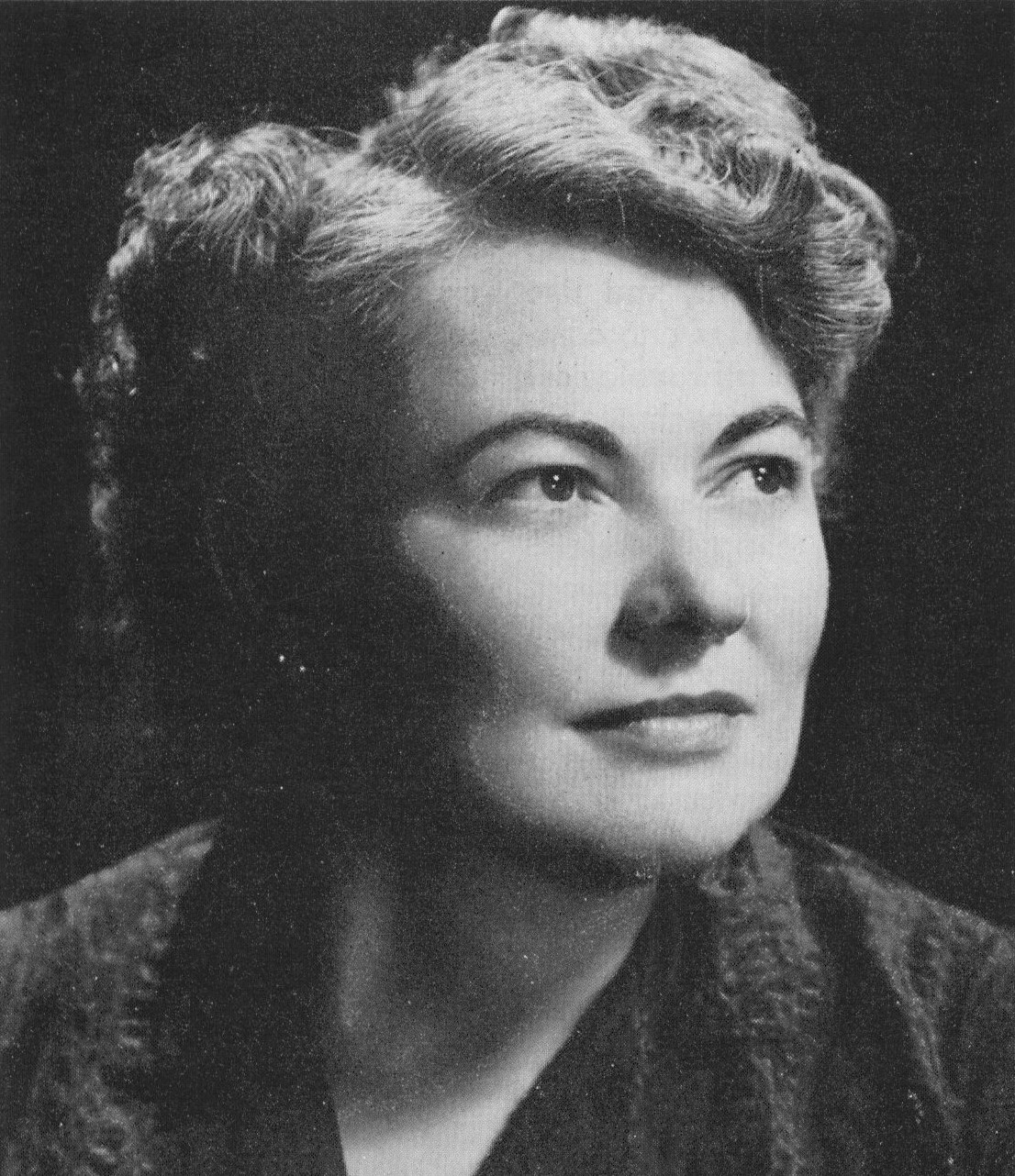
- Smith in 1951, taken by Dolph Zubick
- Born: Marian Wesley Smith; May 10, 1907; New York City
- Died: May 2, 1961 (aged 53); New York City
- Occupation: anthropologist
- Spouse: H. Farrant Akehurst (m. 1952)

Marian Wesley Akehurst (née Smith; May 10, 1907 – May 2, 1961) was an American anthropologist who held leadership positions in American and British anthropological organisations.

== Life ==
Smith was born in New York City in 1907. When she was three years old, she contracted polio, which left her with a paralysed leg. She attended Columbia University, graduating in 1934.

She gained her doctorate and was the last student of Frank Boas. In 1940 she published The Puyallup-Nisqually.

She rose to take leading positions in the American Folklore Society and the American Association for the Advancement of Science. Before she was forty, she became the President of the American Ethnological Society.

In 1950, she published her research on the archaeology of the Columbia-Fraser Region. In 1952, she moved to the UK and married H. Farrant Akehurst.

In 1956, she began teaching part-time in the Anthropology Department of the London School of Economics. In the same year, William Buller Fagg was replaced as the Royal Anthropological Institute's General Secretary by Smith. In 1958, she worked with the Rivers Memorial Medal winner Brenda Seligman to create the Royal Anthropological Institute's endowment fund. The fund was able to bankroll symposia on topics including the artist in tribal society, the domestication of cattle, and race relations.

Smith first had symptoms of her illness in 1949 and died in New York in 1961.
