= W. H. R. Rivers =

English psychiatrist and anthropologist (1864–1922)

W. H. R. Rivers FRS FRAI
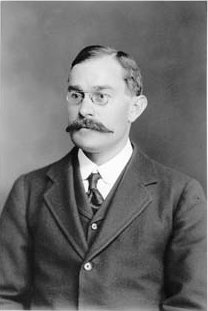
- Born: William Halse Rivers Rivers; 12 March 1864; Chatham, Kent, England
- Died: 4 June 1922 (aged 58); Cambridge, England
- Education: St Bartholomew's Hospital Medical College
- Known for: 1898 Torres Strait Islands expedition; Experiments on nerve regeneration with Henry Head; Treating soldiers during the First World War who had shell shock
- Awards: Honorary M.A from the University of Cambridge, 1897; Croonian Lecturer, 1906; Royal Medal, 1915
- Scientific career
- Fields: Anthropology; ethnology; neurology; psychiatry; psychology
- Workplaces: University College London; University of Cambridge; Craiglockhart War Hospital
- Doctoral students: Charles Samuel Myers; William McDougall; John Layard; Robert H. Thouless; William James Perry

William Halse Rivers Rivers (12 March 1864 – 4 June 1922) was an English anthropologist, neurologist, ethnologist and psychiatrist known for treatment of First World War officers suffering shell shock. Rivers' most famous patient was the war poet Siegfried Sassoon, with whom he remained close friends until his own sudden death.

During the early years of the 20th century, Rivers developed new lines of psychological research. He was the first to use a double-blind procedure in investigating physical and psychological effects of consumption of tea, coffee, alcohol and drugs. For a time he directed centres for psychological studies at two colleges, and he was made a Fellow of St John's College, Cambridge. He also participated in the Torres Strait Islands expedition of 1898, the basis for his seminal work on kinship in anthropology.

== Family background ==
W. H. R. Rivers was born in 1864 at Constitution Hill, Chatham, Kent, son of Elizabeth (née Hunt) and Henry Frederick Rivers.

Records from the eighteenth and early nineteenth centuries show the Rivers family to be solidly middle-class, with many Cambridge, Church of England and Royal Navy associations. Notable members were Gunner William Rivers and his son, Midshipman William Rivers, both of whom served aboard HMS Victory, Nelson's flagship.

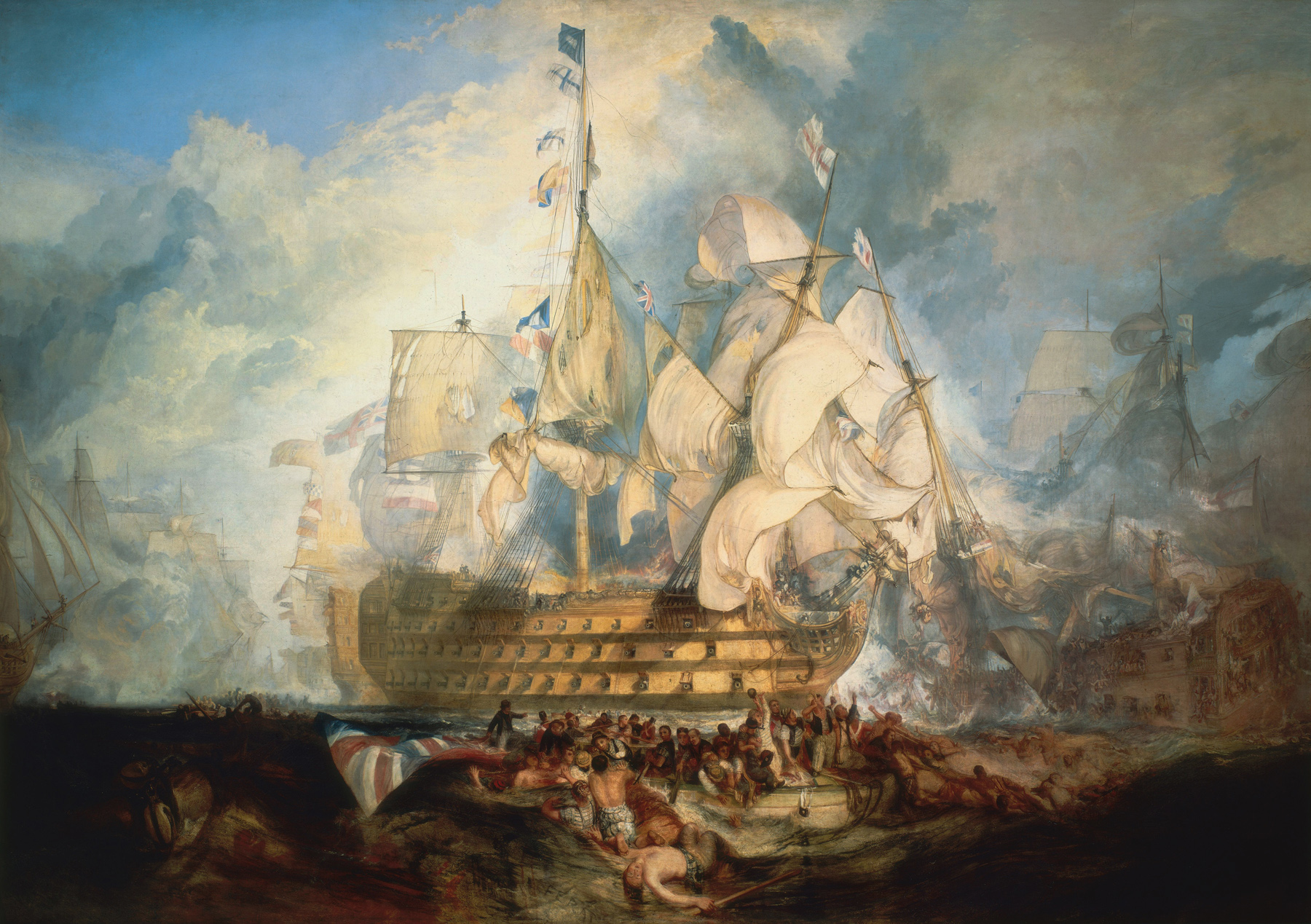
HMS Victory

The senior Rivers was the master gunner aboard the Victory. He kept a commonplace book (now held in the Royal Naval Museum library in Portsmouth); it has revealed and preserved the thoughts of many of the sailors aboard the Victory.

His son Midshipman Rivers, who claimed to be "the man who shot the man who fatally wounded Lord Nelson", was a model of heroism in the Battle of Trafalgar. The seventeen-year-old midshipman nearly lost his foot when it was struck by a grenade; it was attached to him only "by a Piece of Skin abought 4 inch above the ankle". Rivers asked first for his shoes, then told the gunner's mate to look after the guns, and told Captain Hardy that he was going down to the cockpit. He endured the amputation of his leg four inches below the knee, without anaesthetic. According to legend, he did not cry out once during that nor during the consequent sealing of the wound with hot tar. When Gunner Rivers, anxious about his son's welfare, went to the cockpit to ask after him, his son called out, "Here I am, Father, nothing is the matter with me; only lost my leg and that in a good cause."

After the battle, the senior Rivers wrote a poem about his remarkable son, entitled "Lines on a Young Gentleman that lost his leg onboard the Victory in the Glorious action at Trafalgar":

May every comfort Bless thy future life,
And smooth thy cares with fond and tender wife.
Which of you all Would not have freely died,
To Save Brave Nelson There Dear Country's Pride.

Born to Lieutenant William Rivers, R.N., and his wife, stationed at Deptford, Henry Frederick Rivers followed many family traditions in being educated at Trinity College, Cambridge and entering the church. Having earned his Bachelor of Arts in 1857, he was ordained as a Church of England priest in 1858, and had a career that would span almost 50 years. In 1904, he was forced to tender his resignation due to "infirmities of sight and memory".

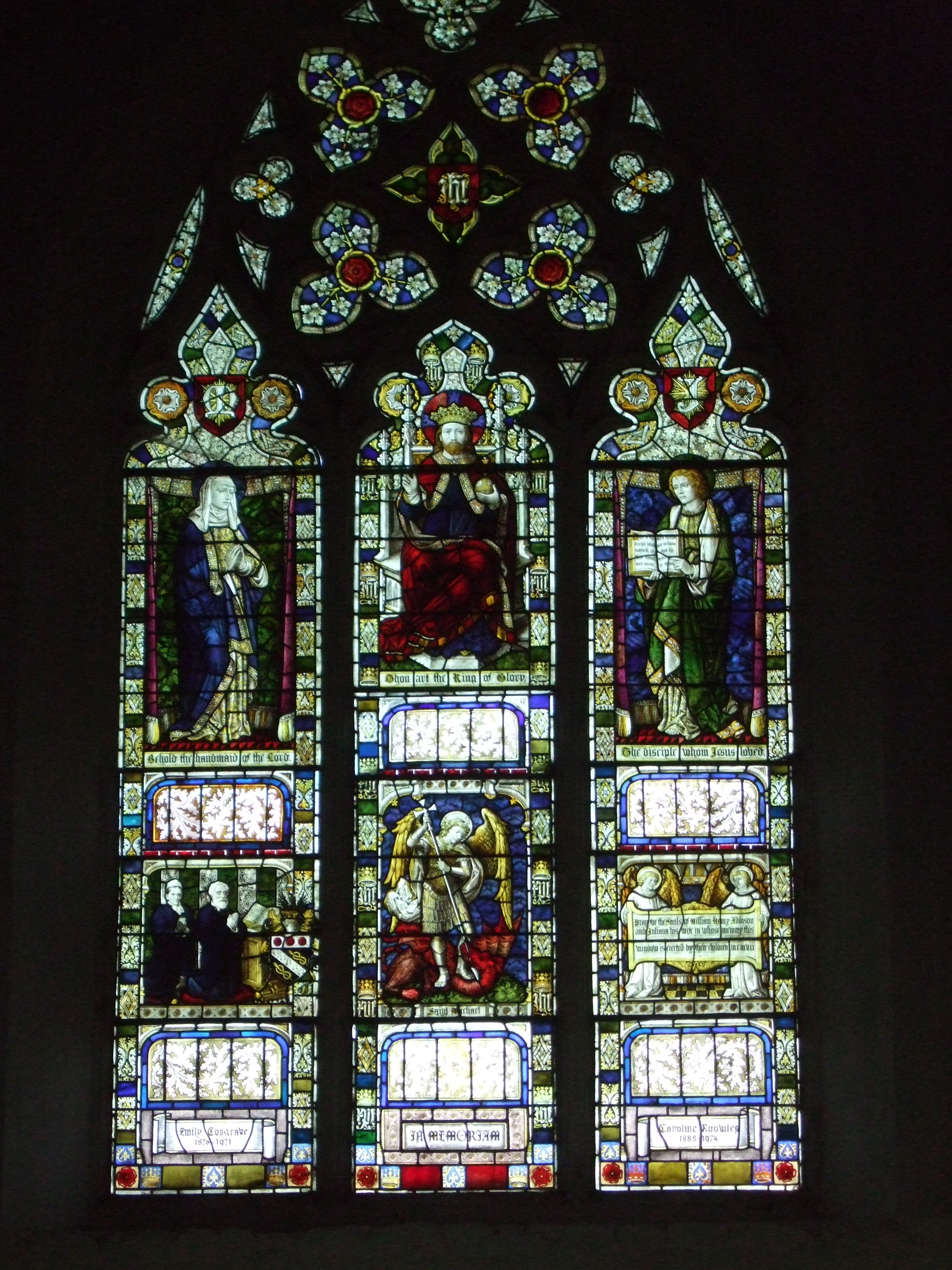
Image of the stained glass window of the church in Offham, Kent, where Henry Rivers was curate from 1880 to 1889

In 1863, having obtained a curacy at Chatham in addition to a chaplaincy of the Medway Union, Henry Rivers was sufficiently established to marry Elizabeth Hunt, who was living with her brother James in Hastings, not far from Chatham. He was later appointed to curacies in Kent at St Mary's, Chatham (1863–1869), Tudeley (1877–1880) and Offham (1880–1889), and subsequently as Vicar of St Faith's, Maidstone from 1889 to 1904.

The Hunts, like the Rivers family, were established with naval and Church of England connections. One of those destined for the pulpit was Thomas, but some quirk of originality set him off into an unusual career. While an undergraduate at Cambridge, Thomas Hunt had a friend who stammered badly and his efforts to aid the affected student led him to leave the university without taking a degree in order to make a thorough study of speech and its defects. He built up a good practice as a speech therapist and was patronised by Sir John Forbes MD FRS. Forbes referred pupils to him for twenty-four years. Hunt's most famous case came about in 1842. George Pearson, the chief witness in a case related to an attempted attack on Queen Victoria by John Francis, was brought into court but was incapable of giving his evidence. After a fortnight's instruction from Hunt, he spoke easily, a fact certified by the sitting magistrate. Hunt died in 1851, survived by his wife Mary and their two children. His practice was passed on to his son, James.

James Hunt was an exuberant character, giving to each of his ventures his boundless energy and self-confidence. Taking up his father's legacy with great zeal, by the age of 21 Hunt had published his compendious work Stammering and Stuttering, Their Nature and Treatment. This went into six editions during his lifetime and was reprinted again in 1870, just after his death, and for an eighth time in 1967 as a landmark in the history of speech therapy. In the introduction to the 1967 edition of the book, Elliot Schaffer notes that in his short lifetime, James Hunt is said to have treated over 1,700 cases of speech impediment, firstly in his father's practice and later at his own institute, Ore House near Hastings. He set up the latter with the aid of a doctorate he had purchased in 1856 from the University of Giessen in Germany.

In later, expanded editions, Stammering and Stuttering begins to reflect Hunt's growing passion for anthropology, exploring the nature of language usage and speech disorders in non-European peoples. In 1856, Hunt had joined the Ethnological Society of London and by 1859 he was its joint secretary. But many of the members disliked his attacks on the religious and humanitarian agencies represented by missionaries and the anti-slavery movement.

As a result of the antagonism, Hunt founded the Anthropological Society and became its president. Nearly 60 years later, his nephew W. He. R. Rivers was selected for this position. Hunt's efforts were integral to the British Association for the Advancement of Science (BAAS) accepting anthropology in 1866 as a discipline.

Even by Victorian standards, Hunt was a decided racist. His paper "On a Negro's Place in Nature", delivered before the BAAS in 1863, was met with hisses and catcalls. What Hunt considered "a statement of the simple facts" was thought by others to be a defence of the subjection and slavery of Africans in the Americas, and support of the belief in the plurality of human species.

In addition to his extremist views, Hunt led the society to incur heavy debts. The controversies surrounding his conduct told on his health and, on 29 August 1869, Hunt died of "inflammation of the brain". He was survived by his widow, Henrietta Maria, and five children.

His speech therapy practice was passed onto Hunt's brother-in-law, Henry Rivers, who had been working with him for some time. Rivers inherited many of Hunt's established patients, most notably The Reverend Charles L. Dodgson (better known as Lewis Carroll), who had been a regular visitor to Ore House.

Hunt left his books to his nephew William Rivers, who refused them, thinking that they would be of no use to him.

== Early life ==
William Halse Rivers Rivers was the oldest of four children, with his siblings being brother Charles Hay (29 August 1865 – 8 November 1939) and sisters Ethel Marian (30 October 1867 – 4 February 1943) and Katharine Elizabeth (1871–1939).

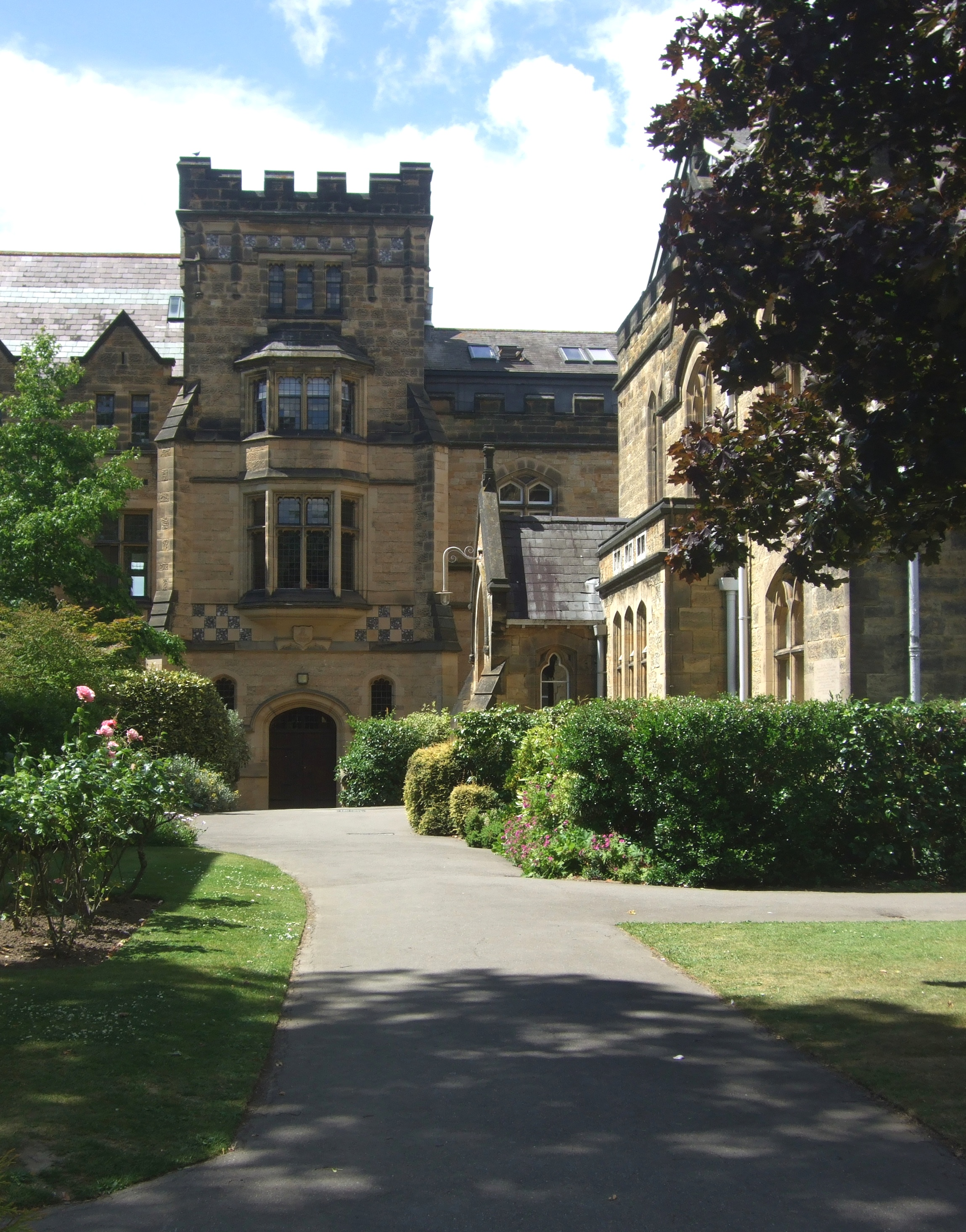
Tonbridge School where Rivers and his brother Charles were day-boys

William, known as "Willie" throughout his childhood, appears to have been named after his famous uncle of Victory fame; there was also a longstanding family tradition whereby the eldest son of every line would be baptised by that name. The origin of "Halse" is unclear. There may be some naval connection, as it has been suggested that it could have been the name of someone serving alongside his uncle. Slobodin states that it is probable that the second "Rivers" entered his name as a result of a clerical error on the baptismal certificate, but since the register is filled in by his father's hand, and his father performed the ceremony, this seems unlikely. Slobodin notes a mistake on the registry of his birth, but it is that his name was changed from the mistaken "William False Rivers Rivers" to its later form, with "Halse" as the second name. This suggests that "Rivers" was intended as a given name as well as a surname.

Rivers had a stammer that he never fully conquered. He had no sensory memory, although he was able to visualise to an extent if dreaming, in a half-waking, half-sleeping state, or when feverish. Rivers noted that in his early life- specifically before the age of five- his visual imagery was far more definite than it became in later life. He thought it was perhaps as good as that of the average child.

At first, Rivers had concluded that his loss of visual imagery had resulted from his lack of attention and interest in it. But, as he later came to realise, while images from his later life frequently faded into obscurity, those from his infancy still remained vivid.

As Rivers notes in Instinct and the Unconscious, he was unable to visualise any part of the upper floor of the house he lived in until he was five. By contrast, Rivers was able to describe the lower floors of that particular house with far more accuracy than he had been able to with any house since. Although images of later houses were faded and incomplete, no memory since had been as inaccessible as that of the upper floor of his early home. Given evidence, Rivers came to conclude that something had happened to him on the upper floor of that house, the memory of which was entirely suppressed because it "interfered with [his] comfort and happiness". In addition to that specific memory being inaccessible, his sensory memory in general appears to have been severely disabled from that moment.

Author Pat Barker, in the second novel of her Regeneration Trilogy related to Rivers and his work, The Eye in the Door, suggested through her character Billy Prior, that Rivers's experience was traumatic enough to cause him to "put his mind's eye out".

Rivers was a highly able child. Educated first at a Brighton preparatory school and, from the age of thirteen, as a dayboy at the prestigious Tonbridge School, his academic abilities were noted from an early age. At the age of 14, he was placed a year above others of his age at school and even within this older group he was seen to excel, winning prizes for Classics and all around attainment. Rivers's younger brother Charles was also a high achiever at the school; he too was awarded with the Good Work prize. He studied and became a civil engineer. After a bad bout of malaria contracted whilst in the Torres Straits with his brother, he was encouraged by the elder Rivers to take up outdoor work.

The teenage Rivers, whilst scholarly, was also involved in other aspects of school life. As the programme for the Tonbridge School sports day notes, on 12 March 1880 – Rivers's sixteenth birthday – he ran in the mile race. The year before this he had been elected as a member of the school debating society, no mean feat for a boy who at this time had a speech impediment which was almost paralytic.

A young W. H. R. Rivers

Rivers was set to follow family tradition and take his University of Cambridge entrance exam, possibly with the aim of studying classics. But at the age of sixteen, he contracted typhoid fever and was forced to miss his final year of school. Without the scholarship, his family could not afford to send him to Cambridge. With his typical resilience, Rivers did not dwell on the disappointment.

His illness had been severe, entailing long convalescence and leaving him with effects which at times severely disabled him. As L. E. Shore notes: "he was not a strong man, and was often obliged to take a few days rest in bed and subsist on a milk diet". The severity of the sickness and the shattering of dreams might have broken lesser men but for Rivers in many ways the illness was the making of him. Whilst recovering from the fever, Rivers had formed a friendship with one of his father's speech therapy students, a young Army surgeon. His plan was formed: he would study medicine and apply for training in the Army Medical Department, later to become the Royal Army Medical Corps.

Inspired by this new resolve, Rivers studied medicine at the University of London, where he matriculated in 1882, and St Bartholomew's Hospital in London. He graduated at age 22, the youngest person to do so until recent times.

== Life as a ship's surgeon ==
After qualifying, Rivers sought to join the army but was not passed fit. This was a byproduct of typhoid fever. As Elliot Smith was later to write, as quoted in a biography of Rivers: "Rivers always had to fight against ill health: heart and blood vessels." Along with the health problems noted by Shore and Smith, Rivers struggled with "tiring easily".

His sister Katharine wrote that when he came to visit the family, he would often sleep for the first day or two. Considering the volume of work that Rivers completed in his relatively short lifetime, Seligman wrote in 1922 that "for many years he seldom worked for more than four hours a day". Rivers's biographer Richard Slobodin says that "among persons of extraordinary achievement, only Descartes seems to have put in as short a working day".

Rivers did not allow his drawbacks to dishearten him, and he chose to serve several terms as a ship's surgeon, travelling to Japan and North America in 1887. This was the first of many voyages; for, besides his great expeditions for work in the Torres Straits Islands, Melanesia, Egypt, India and the Solomon Islands, he took holiday voyages twice to the West Indies, three times to the Canary Islands and Madeira, to the United States, Norway, and Lisbon, as well as making numerous visits to France, Germany, Italy, and Switzerland, and lengthy ones to visit family in Australia.

Such voyages helped to improve his health, and possibly to prolong his life. He also took a great deal of pleasure from his experiences aboard ship. On one voyage he spent a month in the company of playwright George Bernard Shaw; he later described how he spent "many hours every day talking – the greatest treat of my life".

== Beginnings of career in psychology ==
Back in England, Rivers earned an M.D. (London) and was elected a Fellow of the Royal College of Physicians. Soon after, he became house surgeon at the Chichester Infirmary (1887–1889). Although he enjoyed the town and the company of his colleagues, an appointment at Bart's and the opportunity to return to working in research in medicine was more appealing. He became house physician at St Bartholomew's in 1889 and remained there until 1890.

At Bart's, Rivers had been a physician to Samuel Gee. Those under Gee were conscious of his indifference towards, if not outright dislike of, the psychological aspects of medicine. Walter Langdon-Brown surmises that Rivers and his fellow Charles S. Myers devoted themselves to these aspects in reaction to Gee.

Rivers's interests in neurology and psychology became evident in this period. Reports and papers given by Rivers at the Abernethian Society of St Bart's indicate a growing specialisation in these fields: Delirium and its allied conditions (1889), Hysteria (1891) and Neurasthenia (1893).

Following the direction of his passion for the workings of the mind as it correlates with the workings of the body, in 1891 Rivers became house physician at the National Hospital for the Paralysed and Epileptic. Here he and Henry Head met and formed a lasting friendship.

Rivers's interest in the physiology of the nervous system and in "the mind", that is, in sensory phenomena and mental states, was further stimulated by work in 1891. He was chosen to be one of Victor Horsley's assistants in a series of investigations at University College London that explored the existence and nature of electrical currents in the mammalian brain. His selection for this work demonstrated his growing reputation as a researcher.

In the same year, Rivers joined the Neurological Society of London and presented A Case of Treadler's Cramp to a meeting of the society. The case demonstrated the ill effects of what is understood as repetitive motion injury. Such injuries sustained by factory workers, against which they had little protection or compensation, were part of the cost for millions of people of Britain's industrial supremacy.

Resigning from the National Hospital in 1892, Rivers travelled to Jena to expand his knowledge of experimental psychology. Whilst in Jena, Rivers became fluent in German and attended lectures on both psychology and philosophy. He also became deeply immersed in the culture; in a diary he kept of the journey he comments on the buildings, picture galleries, church services, and education system, showing his wide interests and critical judgement. In this diary he also wrote that: "I have during the last three weeks come to the conclusion that I should go in for insanity when I return to England and work as much as possible at psychology."

After his return to England, he became a Clinical Assistant at the Bethlem Royal Hospital. In 1893, at the request of G. H Savage, he began assisting with lectures in mental diseases at Guy's Hospital, emphasising their psychological aspect. At about the same time, invited by Professor Sully, he began to lecture on experimental psychology at University College London.

By 1893, when he was unexpectedly invited to lecture in Cambridge on the functions of the sense organs, he was already deeply read in the subject. He had been captivated by Head's accounts of the works of Ewald Hering, and had avidly absorbed his views on colour vision and the nature of vital processes in living matter. He also prepared for this project by spending the summer working in Heidelberg with Emil Kraepelin on measuring the effects of fatigue.

The offer of a Cambridge lectureship resulted from continuing evolution within the university's Natural Science Tripos. Earlier in 1893, Professor McKendrick, of Glasgow, had examined the subject and reported unfavourably on the scant knowledge of the special senses that was displayed by the candidates; to correct this, Sir Michael Foster appointed Rivers as a lecturer. He became Fellow Commoner at St John's College. He was made a Fellow of the college in 1902.

Rivers was stretched in his work, as he still had ongoing teaching commitments at Guy's hospital and at University College. In addition to these mounting responsibilities, in 1897 he was put in temporary charge of the new psychological laboratory at University College. That year Foster had assigned him a room in the Physiology Department at Cambridge for use in psychological research. As a result, Rivers is listed in the histories of experimental psychology as simultaneously the director of the first two psychological laboratories in Britain.

Rivers's work has been considered to have profound influence on Cambridge and in the scientific world in general. But, at the time, the Cambridge University Senate were wary of his appointment. Bartlett wrote: "how many times have I heard Rivers, spectacles waving in the air, his face lit by his transforming smile, tell how, in Senatorial discussion, an ancient orator described him as a 'Ridiculous Superfluity'!"

The opposition of the Senate resulted in limited support for Rivers's work in its early years. It was not until 1901, eight years after his appointment, that he was allowed the use of a small cottage for the laboratory, and budgeted thirty-five pounds annually (later increased to fifty) for purchase and upkeep of equipment. For several years Rivers continued in this way until the Moral Science Board increased support; in 1903, Rivers and his assistants and students moved to another small building in St Tibbs Row. These working spaces were characterised as "dismal", "damp, dark and ill-ventilated" but they did not discourage the Cambridge psychologists. Psychology began to thrive: "perhaps, in the early days of scientific progress, a subject often grows all the more surely if its workers have to meet difficulties, improvise their apparatus, and rub very close shoulders one with another." In 1912 a well-equipped laboratory was finally built under the directorship of Charles S. Myers, one of Rivers's earliest and ablest pupils. A wealthy man, he supplemented the university grant with his own funds.

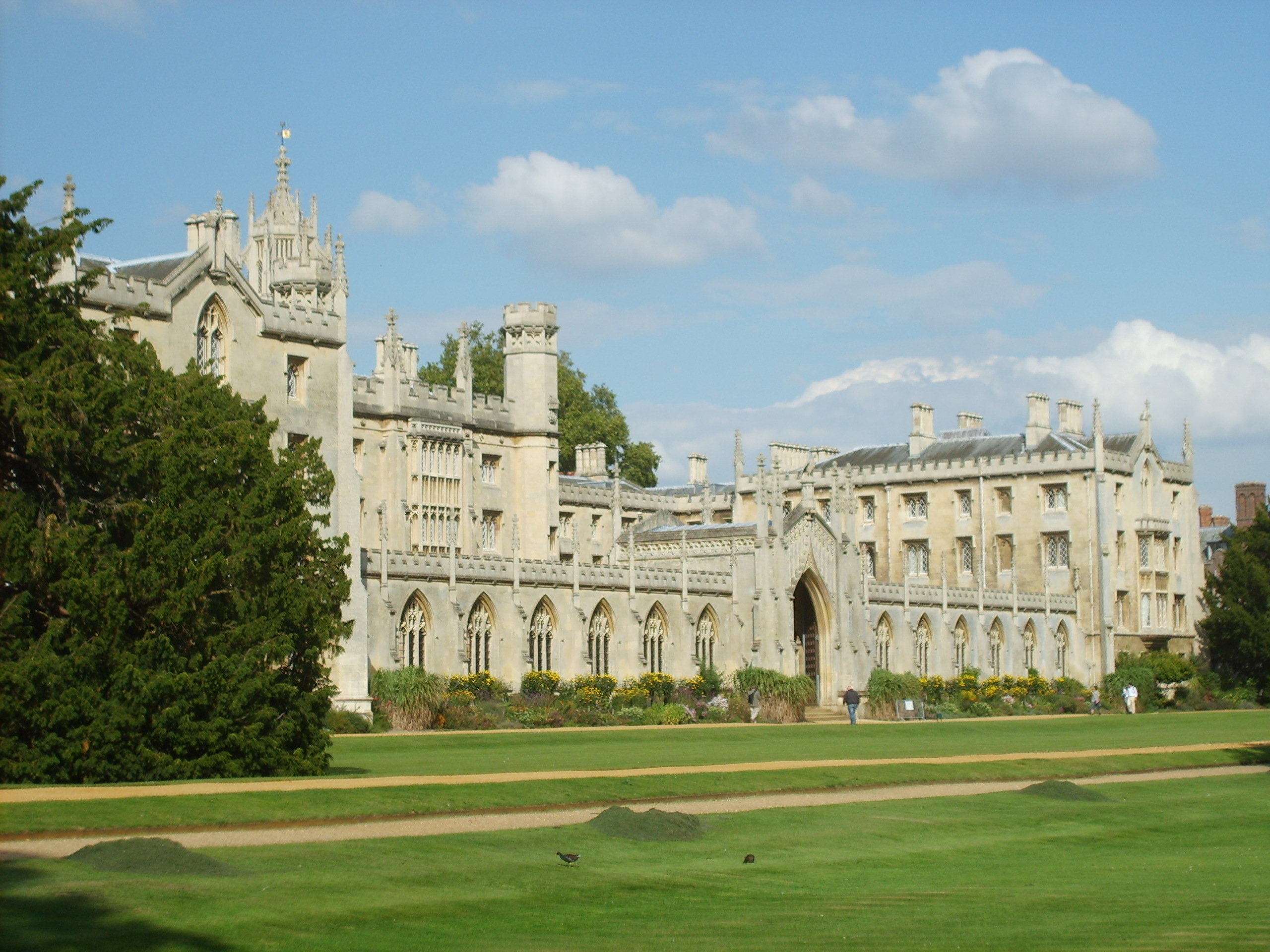
View of St John's College, Cambridge

The Cambridge psychologists and Rivers were initially most interested in the special senses: colour vision, optical illusions, sound-reactions, and perceptual processes. In these fields, Rivers was rapidly becoming eminent. He was invited to write a chapter on vision for Schäfer's Handbook of Physiology. According to Bartlett, Rivers's chapter "still remains, from a psychological point of view, one of the best in the English Language". Rivers reviewed the work of previous investigators, incorporated his own, and critically examined the rival theories of colour vision. He noted clearly the significance of psychological factors in, for instance, the phenomena of contrast.

For his own experiments on vision, Rivers worked with graduate medical students Charles S. Myers and William McDougall. They assisted him and developed close friendships in the process of working together. Rivers also collaborated with Sir Horace Darwin, a pioneer instrument maker, to improve apparatus for recording sensations, especially those involved in vision. This collaboration also resulted in a lifelong friendship between the two men.

In this period, Rivers also investigated the influence of stimulants: tea, coffee, alcohol, tobacco, and a number of other drugs, on a person's capacity for both physical and mental work. His work under Kraepelin at Heidelberg had prepared him for this work. Rivers conducted some experiments on himself, for instance for two years giving up alcoholic beverages and tobacco, neither of which he liked, but also giving up all tea, coffee and cocoa as well. Initially he intended to explore physiological incentives for consuming these products, but he quickly realised that a strong psychological influence contributed to taking the substances.

Rivers realised that part of the effects – mental and physical – that substances had were caused psychologically by the excitement of knowing that one is indulging. In order, to eliminate "all possible effects of suggestion, sensory stimulation and interest", Rivers ensured that the substances were disguised so that he could not ascertain, in any instance, whether he was taking a drug or a control substance. This was the first experiment of its kind to use this double-blind procedure. As a result of the importance attached to the study, Rivers was appointed in 1906 as Croonian Lecturer to the Royal College of Physicians.

In December 1897 Rivers's achievements were recognised by the University of Cambridge who honoured him with the degree of M.A. honoris causa and, in 1904 with the assistance of Professor James Ward, Rivers made a further mark on the world of psychological sciences, founding and subsequently editing the British Journal of Psychology.

Despite his many successes, Rivers was still a markedly reticent man in mixed company, hampered as he was by his stammer and innate shyness. In 1897, Langdon-Brown invited Rivers to come and address the Abernethian Society. The occasion was not an unqualified success. He chose "Fatigue" as his subject, and before he had finished his title was writ large on the faces of his audience. In the Cambridge physiological laboratory too he had to lecture to a large elementary class. He was rather nervous about it, and did not like it, his hesitation of speech made his style dry and he had not yet acquired the art of expressing his original ideas in an attractive form, except in private conversation.

Among two or three friends, however, the picture of Rivers is quite different. His conversations were full of interest and illumination; "he was always out to elicit the truth, entirely sincere, and disdainful of mere dialect." His insistence on veracity made him a formidable researcher, as Haddon puts it, "the keynote of Rivers was thoroughness. Keenness of thought and precision marked all his work." His research was distinguished by a fidelity to the demands of experimental method very rare in the realms which he was exploring and, although often overlooked, the work that Rivers did in this early period is of immense import as it formed the foundation of all that came later.

== Torres Straits expedition ==
Rivers recognised in himself "the desire for change and novelty, which is one of the strongest aspects of my mental makeup" and, while fond of St John's, the staid lifestyle of his Cambridge existence showed in signs of nervous strain and led him to experience periods of depression.

The turning point came in 1898 when Alfred Cort Haddon seduced "Rivers from the path of virtue... (for psychology then was a chaste science)... into that of anthropology:" He made Rivers first choice to head an expedition to the Torres Straits. Rivers's first reaction was to decline, but he soon agreed on learning that C. S. Myers and William McDougall, two of his best former students, would participate. The other members were Sidney Ray, C. G. Seligman, and a young Cambridge graduate named Anthony Wilkin, who was asked to accompany the expedition as photographer. In April 1898, the Europeans were transported with gear and apparatus to the Torres Straits. Rivers was said to pack only a small handbag of personal effects for such field trips.

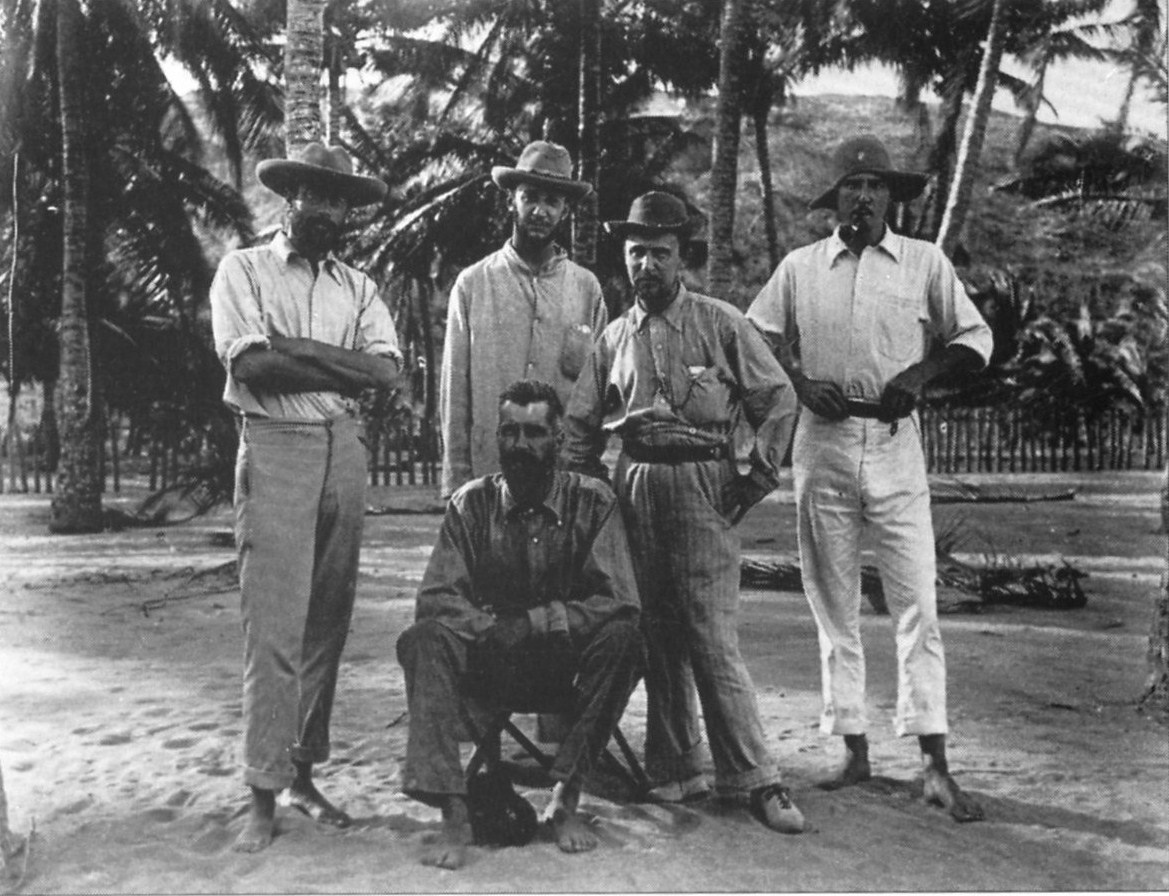
Members of the 1898 Torres Straits Expedition. Standing (from left to right): Rivers, Seligman, Ray, Wilkin. Seated: Haddon

From Thursday Island, several of the party found passage, soaked by rain and waves, on the deck of a crowded 47-foot ketch. In addition to sea sickness, Rivers had been badly sunburnt on his shins and for many days had been quite ill. On 5 May, in a bad storm nearing their first destination of Murray Island, the ship dragged anchor on the Barrier Reef and the expedition almost met disaster Later Rivers recalled the palliative effect of near shipwreck.

When the ketch dropped anchor, Rivers and Ray were at first too ill to go ashore. However the others set up a surgery to treat the native islanders and Rivers, lying in bed next-door tested the patients for colour vision: Haddon's diary noted "He is getting some interesting results." The warmth shown to the sickly Rivers by the Islanders contributed to strong positive feelings for the work and a deep concern for the welfare of Melanesians during the remainder of his life.

Rivers's first task was to examine the colour vision of the islanders and compare it to that of Europeans. In the course of his examinations of the visual acuity of the natives, Rivers showed that colour-blindness did not exist or was very rare, but that the colour vision of Papuans was not the same type as that of Europeans; they possessed no word for blue, and an intelligent native found nothing unnatural in applying the same name to the brilliant blue sea or sky and to the deepest black. "Moreover", Head goes on to state in Rivers's obituary notice,

he was able to explode the old fallacy that the 'noble savage' was endowed with powers of vision far exceeding that of civilised natives. Errors of refraction are, it is true, less common, especially myopia. But, altogether the feats of the Torres Straits islanders equalled those reported by travellers from other parts of the world, they were due to the power of attending to minute details in familiar and strictly limited surrounding, and not to supernormal visual acuity.

It was at this point that Rivers began collecting family histories and constructing genealogical tables but his purpose appears to have been more biological than ethnological since such tables seem to have originated as a means of determining whether certain sensory talents or disabilities were hereditary. However, these simple tables soon took on a new perspective.

It was at once evident to Rivers that

the names applied to the various forms of blood relationship did not correspond to those used by Europeans, but belonged to what is known as a 'classificatory system'; a man's 'brothers' or 'sisters' might include individuals we should call cousins and the key to this nomenclature is to be found in forms of social organisation especially in varieties of the institution of marriage.

Rivers found that relationship terms were used to imply definite duties, privileges and mutual restrictions in conduct, rather than being biologically based as Europeans' are. As Head puts it: "all these facts were clearly demonstrable by the genealogical method, a triumphant generalisation which has revolutionised ethnology."

The Torres Straits expedition was "revolutionary" in many other respects as well. For the first time, British anthropology had been removed from its "armchair" and placed into a sound empirical basis, providing the model for future anthropologists to follow. In 1916, Sir Arthur Keith stated in an address to the Royal Anthropological Institute, that the expedition had engendered "the most progressive and profitable movement in the history of British anthropology."

While the expedition was clearly productive and, in many ways, arduous for its members, it was also the foundation of lasting friendships. The team would reunite at many points and their paths would frequently converge. Of particular note is the relationship between Rivers and Haddon, the latter of whom regarded the fact he had induced Rivers to come to the Torres Straits as his claim to fame. Both Rivers and Haddon were serious about their work but at the same time they were imbued with a keen sense of humour and fun. Haddon's diary from Tuesday 16 August reads thus:

Our friends and acquaintances would often be very much amused if they could see us at some of our occupations and I am afraid these would sometimes give occasion to the enemy to blaspheme – so trivial would they appear ... for example one week we were mad on cat's cradle – at least Rivers, Ray and I were – McDougall soon fell victim and even Myers eventually succumbed.

It may seem to be a bizarre occupation for a group of highly qualified men of science, indeed, as Haddon states: "I can imagine that some people would think we were demented – or at least wasting our time." However, both Haddon and Rivers were to use the string trick to scientific ends and they are also credited as inventing a system of nomenclature that enabled them to be able to schematise the steps required and teach a variety of string tricks to European audiences.

The expedition ended in October 1898 and Rivers returned to England. In 1900, Rivers joined Myers and Wilkin in Egypt to run tests on the colour vision of the Egyptians; this was the last time he saw Wilkin, who died of dysentery in May 1901, aged 24.

=== Todas ===
Rivers had already formed a career in physiology and psychology. But now he moved more definitively into anthropology. He wanted a demographically small, fairly isolated people, comparable to the island societies of the Torres Strait, where he might be able to get genealogical data on each and every individual. The Todas in the Nilgiri Hills of Southern India, with their population then about 700 plus, suited Rivers's criteria. And they had specific features of social organisation, such as polyandrous marriage and a bifurcation of their society into so-called moieties that had interested historical evolutionists. Whether his fieldwork was initially so single-minded is questionable, however, since at first Rivers looked at other local communities and studied their visual perception before fixing all his attention on the Todas.

Rivers worked among the Todas for less than six months during 1901–02, communicating with his Toda informants only through interpreters and lodged in an Ootacamund hotel. During this time, he assembled a collection of data on the ritual and social lives of the Toda people. In 1906, he published his findings in his book The Todas.

In the preface to this book Rivers wrote that his work was "not merely the record of the customs and beliefs of a people, but also the demonstration of anthropological method". That method is the collection of genealogical materials for the purpose of more fully investigating other aspects of social life, notably ritual.

The first eleven chapters of The Todas represented in 1906 a novel approach to the presentation of ethnographic data, one that, under the influence of Malinowski, would later become a standard practice in British social anthropology. This is the analysis of a people's society and culture by presentation of a detailed description of a particularly significant institution. In the Toda case, it is the sacred dairy cult. But Rivers is unable to sustain this focus throughout the work, so after a brilliant opening, the book tails off somewhat. We get a good idea of the Toda dairies and the ideas of ritual purity that protect them; but then the author returns to the ready-made categories of the day: gods, magic, kinship, clanship, crime and so on, and says no more about the dairies. Moreover, he failed to discover the existence of matrilineal clans alongside the patrilineal ones. A second, and more important, limitation of his study is its failure to view Toda society as a local and specialised variant of—as A. L. Kroeber wrote—"higher Indian culture". Rivers's book has been largely responsible for the view (now not infrequently held by educated Todas themselves) that these are a people quite distinct from other South Indians.

When, in 1902, Rivers left the Nilgiri Hills and India too, he would never return. Moreover, after the publication of The Todas he wrote very little more about them.

== "A Human Experiment in Nerve Division" ==
Upon his return to England from the Torres Strait, Rivers became aware of a series of experiments being conducted by his old friend Henry Head in conjunction with James Sherren, a surgeon at the London Hospital where they both worked. Since 1901, the pair had been forming a systematic study of nerve injuries among patients attending the hospital. Rivers, who had long been interested in the physiological consequences of nerve division, was quick to take on the role of "guide and counsellor".

It quickly became clear to Rivers, looking in on the experiment from a psycho-physical aspect, that the only way accurate results could be obtained from introspection on behalf of the patient is if the subject under investigation was himself a trained observer, sufficiently discriminative to realise if his introspection was being prejudiced by external irrelevancies or moulded by the form of the experimenter's questions, and sufficiently detached to lead a life of detachment throughout the entire course of the tests. It was in the belief that he could fulfil these requirements, that Head himself volunteered to act, as Langham puts it, "as Rivers's experimental guinea-pig".

So it was that, on 25 April 1903, the radial and external cutaneous nerves of Henry Head's arm were severed and sutured. Rivers was then to take on the role of examiner and chart the regeneration of the nerves, considering the structure and functions of the nervous system from an evolutionary standpoint through a series of "precise and untiring observations" over a period of five years.

At first observation, the day after the operation, the back of Head's hand and the dorsal surface of his thumb were seen to be "completely insensitive to stimulation with cotton wool, to pricking with a pin, and to all degrees of heat and cold." While cutaneous sensibility had ceased, deep sensibility was maintained so that pressure with a finger, a pencil or with any blunt object was appreciated without hesitation.

So that the distractions of a busy life should not interfere with Head's introspective analysis, it was decided that the experimentation should take place in Rivers's rooms. Here, as Head states, "for five happy years we worked together on week-ends and holidays in the quiet atmosphere of his rooms at St John's College." In the normal course of events, Head would travel to Cambridge on Saturday, after spending several hours on the outpatient department of the London Hospital. On these occasions, however, he would find that he was simply too exhausted to work on the Saturday evening so experimentation would have to be withheld until the Sunday. If, therefore, a long series of tests were to be carried out, Head would come to Cambridge on the Friday, returning to London on Monday morning. At some points, usually during Rivers's vacation period, longer periods could be devoted to the observations. Between the date of the operation and their last sitting on 13 December 1907, 167 days were devoted to the investigation.

Since Head was simultaneously collaborator and experimental subject, extensive precautions were taken to make sure that no outside factors influenced his subjective appreciation of what he was perceiving:

No questions were asked until the termination of a series of events; for we found it was scarcely possible... to ask even simple questions without giving a suggestion either for or against the right answer... The clinking of ice against the glass, the removal of the kettle from the hob, tended to prejudice his answers... [Rivers] was therefore particularly careful to make all his preparations beforehand; the iced tubes were filled and jugs of hot and cold water ranged within easy reach of his hand, so that the water of the temperature required might be mixed silently.

Moreover, although before each series of tests Head and Rivers would discuss their plan of action, Rivers was careful to vary this order to such an extent during the actual testing that Head would be unable to tell what was coming next.

Gradually during the course of the investigation, certain isolated spots of cutaneous sensibility began to appear; these spots were sensitive to heat, cold and pressure. However, the spaces between these spots remained insensitive at first, unless sensations- such as heat or cold- reached above a certain threshold at which point the feeling evoked was unpleasant and usually perceived as being "more painful" than it was if the same stimulus was applied to Head's unaffected arm. Also, although the sensitive spots were quite definitely localised, Head, who sat through the tests with his eyes closed, was unable to gain any exact appreciation of the locus of stimulation. Quite the contrary, the sensations radiated widely, and Head tended to refer them to places remote from the actual point of stimulation.

Henry Head and W. H. R. Rivers experimenting in Rivers's rooms (1903–1907)

This was the first stage of the recovery process and Head and Rivers dubbed it the "protopathic", taking its origins from the Middle Greek word protopathes, meaning "first affected". This protopathic stage seemed to be marked by an "all-or-nothing" aspect since there was either an inordinate response to sensation when compared with normal reaction or no reaction whatever if the stimulation was below the threshold.

Finally, when Head was able to distinguish between different temperatures and sensations below the threshold, and when he could recognise when two compass points were applied simultaneously to the skin, Head's arm began to enter the second stage of recovery. They named this stage the "epicritic", from the Greek epikritikos, meaning "determinative".

From an evolutionary perspective, it soon became clear to Rivers that the epicritic nervous reaction was the superior, as it suppressed and abolished all protopathic sensibility. This, Rivers found, was the case in all parts of the skin of the male anatomy except one area where protopathic sensibility is unimpeded by epicritic impulses: the glans penis. As Langham points out, with special references to "Rivers's reputed sexual proclivities", it is at this point that the experiment takes on an almost farcical aspect to the casual reader. However, the investigations, bizarre as they may seem, did have a sound scientific basis since Rivers especially was looking at the protopathic and epicritic from an evolutionary perspective. From this standpoint, the male anatomy maintains one area which is "unevolved" in so much as it is "associated with a more primitive form of sensibility". Using this information about the protopathic areas of the human body, Rivers and Head then began to explore elements of man's psyche. One way in which they did this was to examine the "pilomotor reflex" (the erection of hairs). Head and Rivers noted that the thrill evoked by aesthetic pleasure is "accompanied by the erection of hairs" and they noted that this reaction was no greater in the area of skin with protopathic sensibility than it was in the area of the more evolved epicritic, making it a purely psychologically based phenomena. As Langham puts it: "The image of a man reading a poem to evoke aesthetic pleasure while a close friend meticulously studies the erection of his hairs may seem ludicrous. However, it provides a neat encapsulation of Rivers's desire to subject possibly protopathic phenomena to the discipline of rigorous investigation."

=== Pre-war psychological work ===
In 1904, with Professor James Ward and some others, Rivers founded the British Journal of Psychology of which he was at first joint editor.

From 1908 until the outbreak of the war Rivers was mainly preoccupied with ethnological and sociological problems. Already he had relinquished his official post as lecturer in Experimental Psychology in favour of Charles Samuel Myers, and now held only a lectureship on the physiology of the special senses. By degrees he became more absorbed in anthropological research. But though he was now an ethnologist rather than a psychologist he always maintained that what was of value in his work was due directly to his training in the psychological laboratory. In the laboratory he had learnt the importance of exact method; in the field he now gained vigour and vitality by his constant contact with the actual daily behaviour of human beings.

During 1907–8 Rivers travelled to the Solomon Islands, and other areas of Melanesia and Polynesia. His two-volume History of Melanesian Society (1914), which he dedicated to St Johns, presented a diffusionist thesis for the development of culture in the south-west Pacific. In the year of publication he made a second journey to Melanesia, returning to England in March 1915, to find that war had broken out.

== Great War ==
When Rivers returned to England in spring 1915, he had trouble at first finding a place for himself in the war effort. Following the footsteps of his former student—the current director of the Cambridge Psychology Laboratory—C. S. Myers, the 51-year-old Rivers signed up to serve as a civilian physician at the Maghull Military Hospital near Liverpool. Upon his arrival in July 1915, Rivers was appointed as a psychiatrist and thus he re-entered into the study of "insanity".

"Insanity" in this case entailed working with soldiers who had been diagnosed with any of a wide range of symptoms, which were collectively referred to as "shell shock". These soldiers were known to demonstrate symptoms such as temporary blindness, memory loss, paralysis, and uncontrollable crying. As such, by the time Rivers was assigned to Maghull War Hospital, it was known as the "centre for abnormal psychology", and many of its physicians were employing techniques such as dream interpretation, psychoanalysis and hypnosis to treat shell shock, also known as the war neuroses.

Rivers himself was a well-read psychologist and so was already quite familiar with Freud, Jung, and other psychoanalysts. In fact, Rivers was quite sympathetic to some of Freud's ideas. As such, Rivers joined the band of doctors at Maghull who devoted themselves to understanding the origins and treatment of the "war neuroses" under the guidance of R. G. Rows.

After about a year of service at Maghull War Hospital, Rivers was appointed a captain in the Royal Army Medical Corps, and his two youthful dreams—to be an army doctor and to "go in for insanity"—were realised when he was transferred to Craiglockhart War Hospital near Edinburgh, Scotland in order to help "clean house" following a scandal. There, Rivers treated officers who had been diagnosed with "shell shock", and he also began formulating his theory regarding the origin and treatment of the war neuroses.

Rivers, by pursuing a course of humane treatment, had established two principles that would be embraced by American military psychiatrists in the next war. He had demonstrated, first, that men of unquestioned bravery could succumb to overwhelming fear and, second, that the most effective motivation to overcome that fear was something stronger than patriotism, abstract principles, or hatred of the enemy. It was the love of soldiers for one another.

W. H. R. Rivers outside Craiglockhart

Rivers's methodology for treating the war neuroses are often, and somewhat unfairly, said to have stemmed from Sigmund Freud. While it is true that Rivers was aware of and was influenced by Freud's theories and by the practice of psychoanalysis, he did not blindly subscribe to all of Freud's premises. Most importantly, Rivers saw the instinct of self-preservation rather than the sexual instinct, as the driving force behind war neuroses.

It is on this belief regarding the origins of the war neuroses that he formed his "talking cure". Rivers' "talking cure" was primarily based on the ancient belief of catharsis: the idea that bringing repressed memories into the light of consciousness rids memories and thoughts of their power. As a result, Rivers spent most of his days talking with the officers at Craiglockhart, guiding them through a process Rivers referred to as autognosis. Rivers' autognosis consisted of two parts. The first part included "re-education", or educating the patient about the basics of psychology and physiology. River's method also consisted of helping a soldier comprehend that the illness he was experiencing was not "strange" nor permanent. To Rivers, the war neuroses developed from ingrained ways of reacting, feeling, or thinking: namely, the attempt to wittingly repress all memories of traumatic experiences or unacceptable emotions. Once a patient could understand the source(s) of his troubles (which could be conscious, unconscious, environmental, or a combination), Rivers could then help him contrive ways to overcome these patterns and thus free himself from, or at least adjust to, the illness.

Rivers' approach to treating the war neuroses made him a pioneer in his day; while he was not the first to advocate humane treatment methods for the war neuroses, he was one of the few to do so in a time when there was much debate over the cause and thus the "correct" treatment for shell shock. Furthermore, Rivers encouraged his patients to express their emotions in a time when society encouraged men to keep a "stiff upper-lip". River's method, and his deep concern for every individual he treated, made him famous among his clients. Both Siegfried Sassoon and Robert Graves wrote highly of him during this time.

=== Rivers and Sassoon ===
Sassoon came to Rivers in 1917 after publicly protesting against the war and refusing to return to his regiment, but was treated with sympathy and given much leeway until he voluntarily returned to France. For Rivers, there was a considerable dilemma involved in "curing" his patients simply in order that they could be sent back to the Western Front to die. Rivers's feelings of guilt are clearly portrayed both in fiction and in fact. Through Pat Barker's novels and in Rivers's works (particularly Conflict and Dream) we get a sense of the turmoil the doctor went through. As Sassoon wrote in a letter to Robert Graves (24 July 1918):

O Rivers please take me. And make me
Go back to the war til it break me...

Rivers did not wish to "break" his patients, but at the same time he knew that it was their duty to return to the front and his duty to send them. There is also an implication (given the pun on Rivers's name along with other factors) that Rivers was more to Sassoon than just a friend. Sassoon called him "father confessor", a point that Jean Moorcroft Wilson picks up on in her biography of Sassoon; however, Rivers's tight morals would have probably prevented a closer relationship from progressing:

Rivers's uniform was not the only constraint in their relationship. He was almost certainly homosexual by inclination and it must quickly have become clear to him that Sassoon was too. Yet neither is likely to have referred to it, though we know that Sassoon was already finding his sexuality a problem. At the same time, as an experienced psychologist Rivers could reasonably expect Sassoon to experience "transference" and become extremely fond of him. Paul Fussell suggests in The Great War and Modern Memory (ISBN 0195019180) that Rivers became the embodiment of the male "dream friend" who had been the companion of Sassoon's boyhood fantasies. Sassoon publicly acknowledged that "there was never any doubt about my liking [Rivers]. He made me feel safe at once, and seemed to know all about me". But Sassoon's description of the doctor in Sherston's Progress, lingering as it does on Rivers's warm smile and endearing habits – he often sat, spectacles pushed up on forehead, with his hands clasped around one knee – suggests that it was more than liking he felt. And privately he was rather franker, telling Marsh, whom he knew would understand, that he "loved [Rivers] at first sight".

Not only Sassoon, but his patients as a whole, loved him and his colleague Frederic Bartlett wrote of him

Rivers was intolerant and sympathetic. He was once compared to Moses laying down the law. The comparison was an apt one, and one side of the truth. The other side of him was his sympathy. It was a sort of power of getting into another man's life and treating it as if it were his own. And yet all the time he made you feel that your life was your own to guide, and above everything that you could if you cared make something important out of it.

Sassoon described Rivers's bedside manner in his letter to Graves, written as he lay in hospital after being shot (a head wound that he had hoped would kill him – he was bitterly disappointed when it did not):

But yesterday my reasoning Rivers ran solemnly in,
With peace in the pools of his spectacled eyes and a wisely omnipotent grin;
And I fished in that steady grey stream and decided that I
after all am no longer the Worm that refuses to die.

Rivers was well known for his compassionate, effective and pioneering treatments; as Sassoon's testimony reveals, he treated his patients very much as individuals.

=== Instinct and the Unconscious: A Contribution to a Biological Theory of the Psycho-Neuroses ===
Following his appointment at Craiglockhart War Hospital, Rivers published the results of his experimental treatment of patients in The Lancet, "On the Repression of War Experience", and began to record interesting cases in his book Conflict and Dream, which was published a year after his death by his close friend Grafton Elliot Smith.

In the same year he published his findings in The Lancet, Rivers also composed an article on the various types of "psycho-therapeutics" in practice at the time. Rivers' personal and complete theory on the origin of the "psycho-neuroses", including the war neuroses, was not to be published until 1920 with the publication of Instinct and the Unconscious: A Contribution to a Biological Theory of the Psycho-Neuroses.

River's theory of the neuroses incorporates everything he had researched up until this point and was designed to "consider the general biological function of the process by which experience passes into the region of the unconscious". In attempting to construct such an umbrella theory, Rivers accepted that the unconscious exists and that the contents of the unconscious are entirely inaccessible to a person except through the processes of hypnosis, dreaming, or psychoanalysis. Rivers further defined the unconscious as a repository of instincts and associated experiences (i.e. memories) which are painful or not useful to the organism.

"Instincts", in this regard, are actions which an organism performs without learning and which are executed without the mediating influence of thought. As such, the action has an "all-or-none" aspect to it: it either does not occur at all or it occurs with all of its force. To this end, Rivers included the protopathic sensations, mass-reflex actions (as observed in spinal-cord injury patients), and basic emotions (i.e. anger, fear) as instincts.

Rivers further asserted that all painful or un-useful instincts are naturally kept out of conscious awareness (i.e. in the unconscious) by suppression. Suppression—in this view—is a natural and "unwitting" (unintentional) method for removing painful instincts from consciousness and confining them in the unconscious. Neuroses, therefore, develop when something in the natural process of suppression is disrupted so that a suppressed instinct and its associated emotion are released from the unconscious. Rivers cites two possible reasons for the "escape" of such instincts from the unconscious: either the instinct became too strong to contain, or the normal reserves which typically suppress it were weakened. The etiology of war neuroses is not simply the escape of instincts from the unconscious and the ensuing conflict. More often than not, Rivers believed that the way in which such conflict is resolved (or is attempted to be resolved) also greatly influences the manifestation of the neuroses.

In regards to the war neuroses, Rivers believed that the disease's manifestation stems from the escape of the "self-preservation" or "danger instincts" from the unconscious. These "danger instincts", as Rivers conceives of them, include at least five types of reflexive reactions to danger: (i) fear as manifested by flight, (ii) aggression as manifested by fighting, (iii) the suppression of all emotion in order to complete complex tasks which leads to safety, (iv) terror as manifested by immobility, and (v) the suppression of all physical resources as manifested by collapsing. Typically, reactions i, ii, iv, and v are suppressed so that humans can remain calm in the face of fear and can complete complex actions which lead to safety. When all five "self-preservation" instincts are repeatedly aroused for long periods of time, such as during exposure to war, the instincts gain power and eventually "escape" from the unconscious. As such, the emotions of fear, aggression, and terror arise into consciousness, as do their associated responses. These emotions and their suggested actions create great conflict in the consciousness, however: "fear" and "terror" are far from socially acceptable in war. In order to deal with the conflict created by the "escaped" instincts, Rivers posited that the mind must do something to provide immediate relief. It is this attempt to achieve relief from mental conflicts that leads to war neuroses.

For example, Rivers proposed that officers and soldiers who have night terrors do so because they are trying to wittingly repress emotions and their associated instincts back into the unconscious. Repression, according to Rivers, is never adequate for removing conflict; it is only fruitful when a person can exert a conscious effort to do so. As a result, the repressed instincts, along with their associated emotions and memories, seep into consciousness when soldiers are sleeping. The result is night terrors.

In an alternative scenario, wartime hysteria can be explained as the body's suppression of normal physiological functioning in order to avoid the scenario which activates the danger instincts and releases the associated emotion of fear into consciousness. Hysterical soldiers often presented with symptoms of paralysis and diminished or lost sensory capacities, even in the absence of anxiety or depression. These physiological symptoms, although distressing in themselves, make it impossible for a soldier to be returned to the front line. Thus, the body compensates for its inability to suppress the danger instincts in the face of war by making it so that the soldier must avoid warfare altogether.

Overall, Rivers attributed the neuroses to both (i) the escape of painful instincts and their associated emotions from the unconscious and (ii) the mind's unsuccessful efforts to force such instincts and their emotions back into the conscious. While Rivers' theory contains some Freudian elements, it is not simply a restatement of psychoanalytic theory; Rivers' theory of the neuroses draws heavily on the neurological observations and conclusions Rivers and Henry Head drew from their work on nerve regeneration.

In retrospect, Rivers' particular method of treating the war neuroses and his theory of the origin of neuroses—while pioneering in their day—have failed to leave a huge mark on the history of psychology. However, the general contributions of psychiatrists treating war neuroses, in combination with the overwhelming prevalence of the neuroses during the Great War, led to a revolution in the British perspective of mental illness and its treatment.

== Post war ==
After the war, Rivers became "another and far happier man – diffidence gave place to confidence, reticence to outspokenness, a somewhat laboured literary style to one remarkable for ease and charm". He is quoted as saying "I have finished my serious work and I shall just let myself go." In those post war years, his personality seemed to change dramatically. The man who had been most at home in his study, the laboratory, or the field now dined out a good deal, had joined clubs, went yachting and appeared to welcome rather than shun opportunities for public speaking. Always having been a voracious reader, he now began reading in philosophy, as he had not done for some years, and also in imaginative literature. Not all of his friends from former years welcomed these changes; some felt that, along with his shyness, his scientific caution and good sense may have deserted him to a degree but most people who saw how happy Rivers had become agreed that the slight alterations to his character were for the better.

Rivers had visited his college frequently during the war although, having resigned his position as lecturer, he held no official post. However, upon his return from the Royal Air Force in 1919, the college created a new office for him – "Praelector of Natural Science Studies" – and he was given a free rein to do as he pleased. As Leonard E. Shore recalled in 1923: "when I asked him if he would undertake that work... his eyes shone with a new light I had not seen before, and he paced his rooms for several minutes full of delight." He took his new position to be a mandate to get to know every science student and indeed every other student at St John's, and at other colleges. He would arrange "At Homes" in his rooms on Sunday evenings, as well as Sunday morning breakfast meetings; he also organised informal discussions and formal lectures (many of which he gave himself) in the College Hall. He formed a group called The Socratics and brought to it some of his most influential friends, including H. G. Wells, Arnold Bennett, Bertrand Russell and Sassoon. Sassoon (Patient B in Conflict and Dream) remained particularly friendly with Rivers and regarded him as a mentor. They shared Socialist sympathies.

Captain W. H. R. Rivers RAMC

Having already been made president of the anthropological section of the British Association for the Advancement of Science in 1911, after the war he became president of The Folklore Society (1920), and the Royal Anthropological Institute (1921–1922). He was also awarded honorary degrees from the universities of Manchester, St Andrews and Cambridge in 1919.

Rivers died of a strangulated hernia in the summer of 1922, shortly after being named as a Labour candidate for the 1922 general election. He had agreed to run for parliament, as he said:

because the times are so ominous, the outlook for our own country and the world so black, that if others think I can be of service in political life, I cannot refuse.

He had been taken ill suddenly in his rooms at St John's on the evening of Friday 3 June, having sent his servant home to enjoy the summer festivities. By the time he was found in the morning, it was too late and he knew it. Typically for this man who, throughout his life "displayed a complete disregard for personal gain", he was selfless to the last. There is a document granting approval for the diploma in anthropology to be awarded as of Easter term, 1922, to an undergraduate student from India. It is signed by Haddon and Rivers dated 4 June 1922. At the bottom is a notation in Haddon's handwriting:

Dr. Rivers signed the report on this examination on the morning of the day he died. It was his last official act. A.C.H

Rivers signed the papers as he lay dying in the Evelyn Nursing Home following an unsuccessful emergency operation. He had an extravagant funeral at St John's in accordance with his wishes as he was an expert on funeral rites and his cremated remains were interred in Parish of the Ascension Burial Ground in a grave with a large stone cross. Sassoon was deeply saddened by the death of his father figure and collapsed at his funeral. His loss prompted him to write two poignant poems about the man he had grown to love: "To A Very Wise Man" and "Revisitation".

== Others' opinions of Rivers ==
In the poem The Red Ribbon Dream, written by Robert Graves not long after Rivers's death, he touches on the peace and security he felt in Rivers's rooms:

For that was the place where I longed to be
And past all hope where the kind lamp shone.

An anonymously written poem Anthropological Thoughts can be found in the Rivers collection of the Haddon archives at Cambridge. There is a reference that indicates that these lines were written by Charles Elliot Fox, missionary and ethnographer friend of Rivers.

In Sassoon's autobiography (under the guise of The Memoirs of George Sherston) Rivers is one of the few characters to retain their original names. There is a whole chapter devoted to Rivers and he is immortalised by Sassoon as a near demi-god who saved his life and his soul. Sassoon wrote:

I would very much like to meet Rivers in the next life. It is difficult to believe that such a man as he could be extinguished.

— preface to Medicine, Magic and Religion

Bartlett wrote of his experiences of Rivers in one of his obituaries, as well as in many other articles, as the man had a profound influence on his life:

On June 3 last year I was walking through the grounds of St John's College, here in Cambridge, when I met Dr. Rivers returning from a stroll. He was full of energy and enthusiasm, and began at once to talk about certain new courses of lectures which he proposed to deliver at the Psychological Laboratory during the present year. On the evening of the next day I heard that he was dangerously ill. As I approached the College on the morning of June 5 I saw the flag at half mast. He had, in fact, died in the early afternoon of the preceding day. Never have I known so deep a gloom settle upon the College as fell upon it at that time. There was hardly a man – young or old – who did not seem to be intimately and personally affected. Rivers knew nearly everybody. As Praelector of Natural Sciences at St John's he interviewed all the science freshmen when they came first into residence and, in an amazing number of cases, he kept in close touch with them throughout their Cambridge career. Everybody who came into contact with him was stimulated and helped to a degree which those who are acquainted only with his published works can never fully realise... it is of Rivers as a man that we think; of his eager and unconquerable optimism, and of his belief in the possible greatness of all things human. Whatever may be the verdict of the years upon his published works, the influence of his vivid personality will remain for all who knew him as one of the best things that have ever entered their lives.

Rivers's legacy continues even today in the form of The Rivers Centre, which treats patients with posttraumatic stress disorder using the same famously humane methods as Rivers had. There is also a Rivers Memorial Medal, founded in 1923, which is rewarded each year to an anthropologist who has made a significant impact in his or her field. Appropriately, Haddon was the first to receive this award in 1924.

== In fiction ==
He was a very humane, a very compassionate person who was tormented really by the suffering he saw, and very sceptical about the war, but at the same time he didn't feel he could go the whole way and say no, stop.

— Pat Barker

Sassoon writes about Rivers in the third part of The Memoirs of George Sherston, Sherston's Progress. There is a chapter named after the doctor and Rivers appears in the book as the only character to retain his factual name, giving him a position as a sort of demi-god in Sassoon's semi-fictitious memoirs.

The life of W. H. R. Rivers and his encounter with Sassoon was fictionalised by Pat Barker in the Regeneration Trilogy, a series of three books including Regeneration (1991), The Eye in the Door (1993) and The Ghost Road (1995). The trilogy was greeted with considerable acclaim, with The Ghost Road being awarded the Booker Prize in the year of its publication. Regeneration was filmed in 1997 with Jonathan Pryce in the role of Rivers.

The first book, Regeneration deals primarily with Rivers's treatment of Sassoon at Craiglockhart. In the novel we are introduced to Rivers as a doctor for whom healing patients comes at price. The dilemmas faced by Rivers are brought to the fore and the strain leads him to become ill; on sick leave he visits his brother and the Heads and we learn more about his relationships outside of hospital life. We are also introduced in the course of the novel to the Canadian doctor Lewis Yealland, another factual figure who used electric shock treatment to "cure" his patients. The juxtaposition of the two very different doctors highlights the unique, or at least unconventional, nature of Rivers' methods and the humane way in which he treated his patients (even though Yealland's words, and his own guilt and modesty lead him to think otherwise).

The Eye in the Door concentrates, for the most part, on Rivers' treatment of the fictional character of Prior. Although Prior's character may not have existed, the facts that he makes Rivers face up to did – that something happened to him on the first floor of his house that caused him to block all visual memory and begin to stammer. We also learn of Rivers' treatment of officers in the airforce and of his work with Head. Sassoon too plays a role in the book- Rivers visits him in hospital where he finds him to be a different, if not broken, man, his attempt at 'suicide' having failed. This second novel in the trilogy, both implicitly and directly, addresses the issue of Rivers' possible homosexuality and attraction to Sassoon. From Rivers' reaction to finding out that Sassoon is in hospital to the song playing in the background ('You Made Me Love You') and Ruth Head's question to her husband, "Do you think he's in love with him?" we get a strong impression of the author's opinions on Rivers' sexuality.

The Ghost Road, the final part of the trilogy, shows a side of Rivers not previously seen in the novels. As well as his relationship with his sisters and father, we also learn of his feelings for Charles Dodgson- or Lewis Carroll. Carroll was the first adult Rivers met who stammered as badly as he did and yet he cruelly rejected him, preferring to lavish attention on his pretty young sisters. In this novel the reader also learns of Rivers' visit to Melanesia; feverish with Spanish Flu, the doctor is able to recount the expedition and we are provided with insight both into the culture of the island and into Rivers' very different "field trip persona".

Rivers appears briefly in The God of the Hive, the tenth novel in the Mary Russell and Sherlock Holmes series by mystery writer Laurie R. King, in which he is the author of a medical letter, written during the war, concerning one of that novel's characters.

Rivers appears in Francois Smith's 2014 Afrikaans novel Kamphoer (published in English as The Camp Whore), based on a true story during the Anglo-Boer War . The protagonist, a teenage Afrikaans girl, is raped by British soldiers; Rivers offers her inspiration, through his humane supportive treatment of soldiers. In adulthood, she becomes a psychiatric nurse to overcome her own trauma. In a twist of events, she treats one of the soldiers who had attacked her years earlier.

Rivers appears in the film Benediction, played by Ben Daniels.

== Bibliography ==
- "A Modification of Aristotle's Experiment" (Mind, New Series, Vol. 3, No. 12, Oct. 1894, pp. 583–584)
- "Review of O. Külpe's 'Grundriss d. Psychologie auf experimenteller Grundlage dargestellt'" (Mind, New Series, 3, pp. 413–17)
- "Review of H. Maudsley's 'Pathology of Mind', and E. Kräpelin's 'Psychologische Arbeiten'" (Mind, New Series, 4, pp. 400–3)
- "On the apparent size of objects" (Mind, New Series, Vol. 5, No. 17, Jan. 1896, pp. 71–80)
- "The senses of primitive man" (Abstract in Science, New Series, 11, pp. 740–1, and trans. 'Über die Sinne d. primitiven Menschen'in Umschau, 25)
- "On the function of the maternal uncle in Torres Straits" (Man, Vol. 1, 1901, pp. 171–172)
- "The Todas". Map, illus., 22 cm. London
- "Review of Sex and Society by W. I. Thomas" (Man, Vol. 7, 1907, pp. 111–111)
- "A human experiment in nerve division" (with H. Head) (Brain, XXXI., pp. 323–450)
- The illusion of compared horizontal and vertical lines (with G.D. Hicks), and The influence of small doses of alcohol on the capacity for muscular work (with H.N. Webber) (Br. J. Psychol., II., pp. 252–5)
- "Medicine, Magic and Religion" (Fitzpatrick Lects. 1915) (originally published in stages. Lancet XCIV., pp. 59–65, 117–23)
- "The Repression of War Experience" (Lancet, XCVI., pp. 513–33)
- "Psychiatry and the War" (Science, New Series, Vol. 49, No. 1268 (18 Apr 1919), pp. 367–369)
- Conflict and Dream (edit. G. Elliot Smith). London, 1923.

== See also ==
- Ernest Jones
- Gustave Le Bon
- J. A. Hadfield
- Wilfred Bion
