= Boskop =

- Location within North West (South African province) Location within South Africa
- Coordinates: 26.564°S 27.140°E
- Country: South Africa
- Province: North West
- District: Dr Kenneth Kaunda
- Municipality: JB Marks

Area
  - Total: 18.09 km^{2} (6.98 sq mi)

Population (2011)
  - Total: 184
  - Density: 10.2/km^{2} (26.3/sq mi)

Racial makeup (2011)
  - Black African: 85.3%
  - Coloured: 6.0%
  - White: 8.2%
  - Other: 0.5%

First languages (2011)
  - Tswana: 37.5%
  - Afrikaans: 19.6%
  - Xhosa: 14.1%
  - Zulu: 10.9%
  - Other: 17.9%
- Time zone: UTC+2 (SAST)
- PO box: 2528

Boskop is a small village 16 km north of Potchefstroom. In 1913, the Boskop Man was found here, the first local anatomically modern human skull to be discovered. Consisting only of a post office and railway station on the route Potchefstroom-Welverdiend, the name is Afrikaans and means 'bush hill'.

== See also ==
- Boskop Man
