= Brenda Seligman =

British anthropologist

- Born: Brenda Zara Salaman; 26 June 1883; London
- Died: 2 January 1965 (aged 81); Kensington
- Known for: Anthropology
- Spouse: Charles Seligman

Brenda Zara Seligman (née Salaman; 26 June 1883 – 2 January 1965) was a British anthropologist. She was awarded the Rivers Memorial Medal in 1933 for five years of fieldwork. She married fellow ethnologist Charles Seligman. After he died in 1940, she continued to extend their private museum collections. She rose to be vice-president of the Royal Anthropological Institute and to leave vast collections to leading British museums.

== Life ==
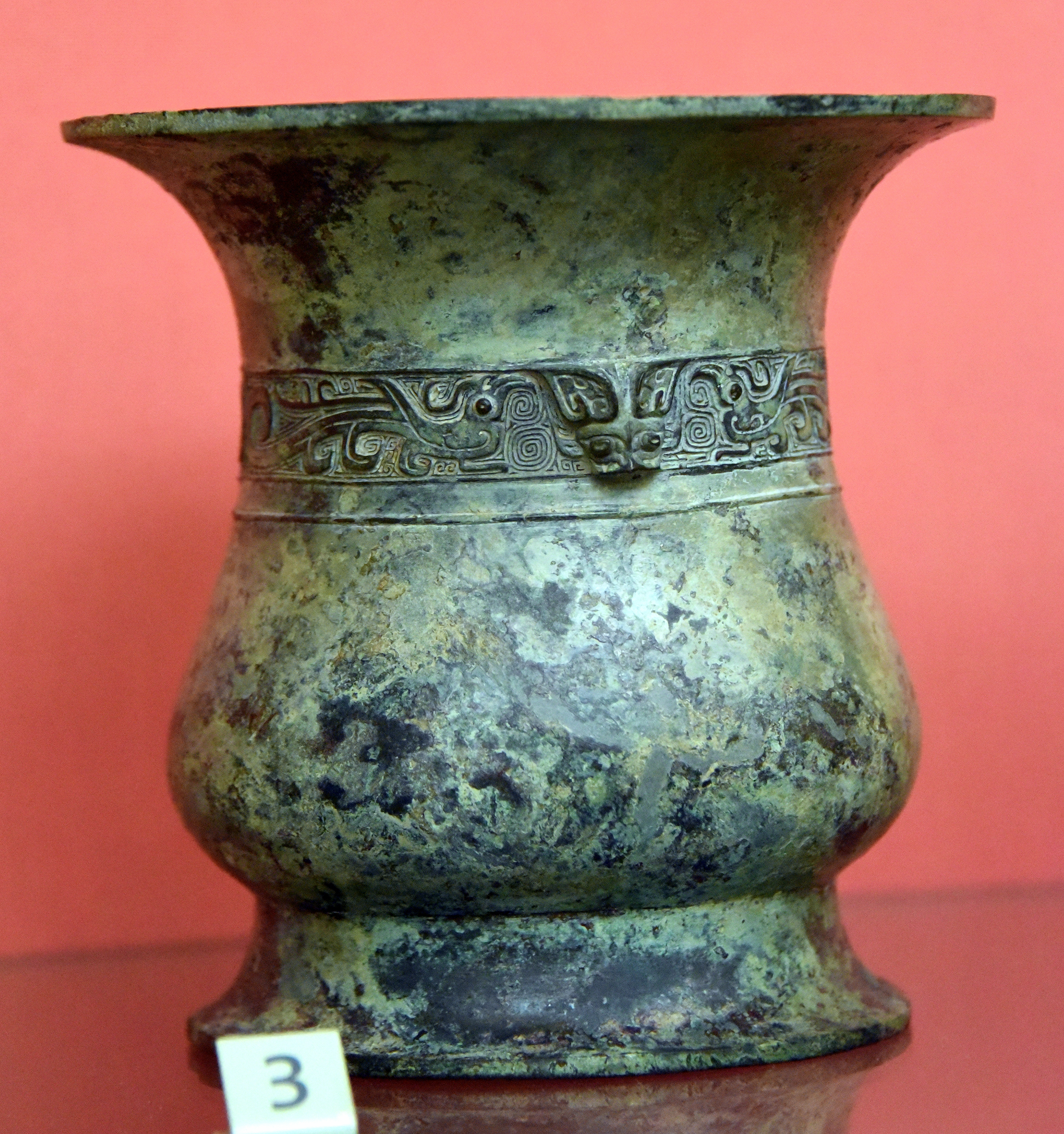
Wine vessel (Zun). Western Zhou Dynasty, 1050-900 BC. Bronze. From China. Mrs. B. Z. Seligman Bequest. Victoria and Albert Museum, London

Seligman was born in London in 1883. She was educated at home before attending Roedean and then she took pre-medical studies at Bedford College.

She married pathologist and anthropologist Charles Seligman in 1905, and helped write up his notes from his visit to New Guinea. The British government was commissioning ethnographic surveys and the two of them undertook that work in Sri Lanka in 1907/8 studying aboriginal culture there. They published a jointly-authored book on this work, The Veddas, in 1911. In 1909 they were undertaking anthropological work in Sudan and archaeological work in Egypt. They returned to Sudan in 1911/12 and 1921/22 where Brenda learnt Arabic. They returned to Egypt in 1913/14.

She would sort out genealogies and wider relationships including particularly women and children where she could gain access denied to men. She and Charles took a joint interest in psychology, magic and beliefs. She tended to leave the study of less abstract aspects to Charles.

She was the winner of Rivers Memorial Medal in 1933 for her work over five years in the field. Her husband had won the medal a few years earlier. He was better known, although their books were issued under both names.

In 1932 they published Pagan Tribes of the Nilotic Sudan which documented work they did together. He died in 1940.

In 1958 she worked with the American born anthropologist, Marian Smith, to create the Royal Anthropological Institute's endowment fund. The fund was able to fund various symposiums including ones on the artist in tribal society, the domestication of cattle and race relations.

Brenda Seligman died in Kensington in 1965. The papers of the Seligmans are held at the London School of Economics.

== Works include ==
- The Veddas, 1911
- Pagan Tribes of the Nilotic Sudan, 1932
