= Notes and Queries =

- Discipline: English language, English literature, lexicography, history
- Language: English

Publication details
- History: 1849 to present
- Publisher: Oxford University Press (UK)

Standard abbreviations
- ISO 4: Notes Queries

Indexing
- ISSN: 0029-3970

Links
- Journal homepage

Notes and Queries, also styled Notes & Queries, is a long-running quarterly scholarly journal that publishes short articles related to "English language and literature, lexicography, history, and scholarly antiquarianism". Its emphasis is on "the factual rather than the speculative". The journal has a long history, having been established in 1849 in London; it is now published by Oxford University Press.

The journal was originally subtitled "a medium of inter-communication for literary men, artists, antiquaries, genealogists, etc". It is now subtitled "For readers and writers, collectors and librarians". Its motto was once "When found, make a note of", the catchphrase of Capt. Cuttle, a character in Dickens's novel Dombey and Son.

It is the 250th-most-quoted source in the Oxford English Dictionary (3rd ed.), giving 1,633 quotations, many being first evidence of a word or a particular meaning.

== Format ==
Notes and Queries was first published in 1849 as a weekly periodical edited by W. J. Thoms. It was founded as an academic correspondence magazine, in which scholars and interested amateurs could exchange knowledge on folklore, literature and history. The format consisted of "Notes" (miscellaneous findings of correspondents that they and the editors considered of potential interest to the readership), and "Queries" (and responses to queries), which formed the bulk of the publication. The magazine has been likened to a 19th-century version of a moderated Internet newsgroup.

Many of the entries in the journal for its first seventy years were only a few paragraphs long, and occasionally as short as a sentence or two. Very frequent contributors include the Rev. Walter W. Skeat, one of the most important figures in the field of English etymology, and Eliza Gutch, a founding member of The Folklore Society. The foundation of such a society was suggested by Gutch through a query to the publication. Gutch contributed to the publication for over seventy years, using the pseudonym "St Swithin".

Today the magazine is produced as an academic journal. The articles are typically much longer than they were during the journal's early years, though they are still shorter than those of the typical academic journal. In addition, the "Notes" now far outweigh the "Queries", and book reviews have also been introduced. The focus is now almost entirely on literature.

== 19th- and 20th-century editors ==
- 1849–1872 William Thoms
- 1872–1878 John Doran
- 1878–1883 Henry Frederic Turle
- 1883–1907 Joseph Knight
- 1907–1912 Vernon Horace Rendall
- 1912–1942 Florence Hayllar
- 1942–1958 Frederick Page
- 1959–1976 James Coutts Maxwell
- 1959–1962 Robert Burchfield
- 1962–2018 Eric Stanley
- 1977–1983 John David Fleeman
- 1977–1998 Douglas Hewitt
- 1983–2021 Glenn Black

== Namesakes ==
Over 20 county or regional publications across England, mostly launched in the late 19th century, adopted a similar "notes and queries" format; 16 of which, beginning with Gloucestershire Notes and Queries in 1879, included the term within their titles. Notes and Queries for Somerset and Dorset (launched in 1888) and Devon and Cornwall Notes and Queries (launched 1900) both survive in regular publication. There have been several incarnations of American Notes and Queries. There are also Canadian Notes & Queries and Kōtare: New Zealand Notes and Queries.

Notes and Queries has also given its name to a number of columns and sections within wider-ranging publications. These include a regular "Notes & Queries" feature in The Guardian newspaper, started in November 1989.

Notes and Queries on Anthropology is an ethnographic manual published in six editions from 1874 to 1951 by the Royal Anthropological Institute of Great Britain and Ireland.

== Anthologies ==
The following anthologies of selections from Notes and Queries have appeared.

Year	Title	Publisher
1857	Milledulcia: A Thousand Pleasant Things selected from Notes and Queries	Appleton
1858	Choice Notes from Notes and Queries	Bell & Daldy
2017	Captain Cuttle's Mailbag: History, Folklore & Victorian Pedantry from the Pages of "Notes and Queries"	Laboratory Books

== See also ==
- Notes and Records
