= Charles Gabriel Seligman =

British physician and ethnologist (1873–1940)

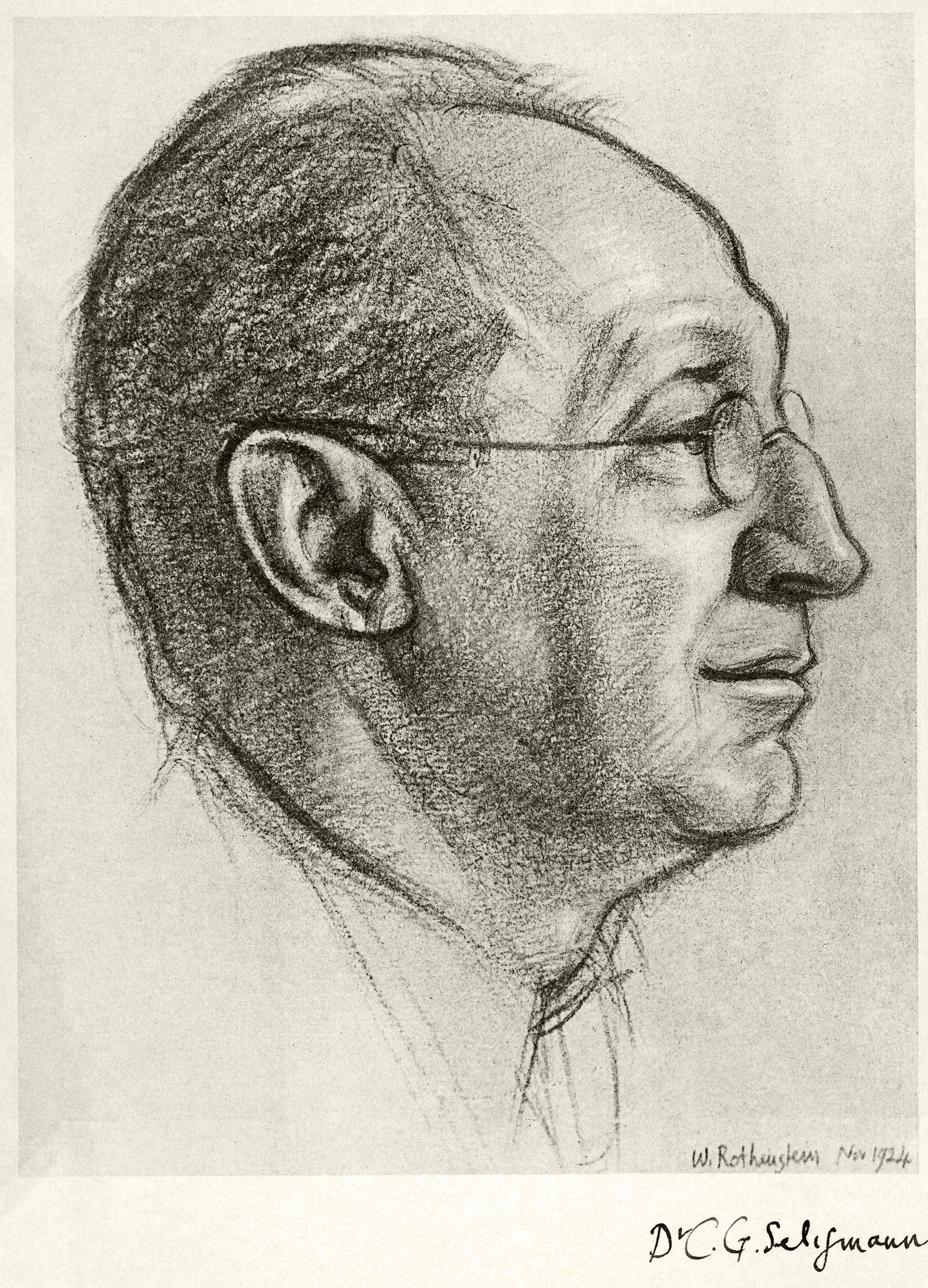
- Portrait of Seligman, 1924
- Born: Charles Gabriel Seligmann; 24 December 1873; London, England
- Died: 19 September 1940 (aged 66); Oxford, England
- Citizenship: British
- Education: St Thomas' Hospital
- Known for: Races of Africa (1930)
- Scientific career
- Fields: Anthropology, history

Charles Gabriel Seligman (né Seligmann; 24 December 1873 – 19 September 1940) was a British physician, ethnologist, and academic. His main ethnographic work described the culture of the Vedda people of Sri Lanka and the Shilluk people of the Sudan. He was a professor at London School of Economics and was influential to prominent anthropologists, such as Bronisław Malinowski, E. E. Evans-Pritchard, and Meyer Fortes.

Seligman was an advocate and published literature for the Hamitic hypothesis, stating the Cushitic, Berber, and Egyptians were thought to have lineage with the speculated, and later debunked, Caucasoid Hamitic people, categorically different to the denoted "Negroids" of Sub-Saharan Africa. His work in the 1920s and 1930s are now seen as white supremacist.

== Life and career ==
Seligman was born into a middle-class Jewish family in London, the son of wine merchant Hermann Seligmann and his wife. Charles shortened his name to Seligman after 1914, when Britain was at war with Germany. He studied medicine at St Thomas' Hospital.

After several years as a physician and pathologist, he volunteered his services to the 1898 Cambridge University expedition to the Torres Strait. He later joined expeditions to New Guinea (1904), Ceylon (1906–1908), and Sudan (1909–1912, again in 1921–1922).

In 1905, Seligman married ethnologist Brenda Zara Salaman, and they travelled on many expeditions together. She had been educated at Bedford College and was skilled at languages. She was able to observe women's ceremonies that Charles was not allowed to see. He credited her in his publications.

From 1913 to 1934, Seligman served as chair of Ethnology at the London School of Economics. The Anthropology department's Seligman Library is named for him.

From 1933, he edited the Cresset Historical Series, a book series published by the Cresset Press in London.

Seligman was also a Fellow of the Royal Society.

== Works ==
=== Hamites ===
Seligman is remembered for his detailed ethnographical work Races of Africa (1930), which recognises four major distinct races of the African continent: Bushmanoids (Bushmen), Pygmies, Negroids, and Caucasoids (Hamites). The Hottentots, Seligman maintains are a mixture of Bushmanoid, Negroid and Hamitic. As a staunch proponent of the Hamitic theory, in his work Seligman asserts that Hamitic Caucasoid North and Northeast Africans were responsible for introducing non-Semitic Afro-Asiatic languages (Berber-Cushitic-Egyptian) into Africa, as well as civilization, technology and all significant cultural developments. In this book, Seligman states his belief that:

"Apart from relatively late Semitic influence...the civilizations of Africa are the civilizations of the Hamites, its history is the record of these peoples and of their interaction with the two other African stocks, the Negro and the Bushmen, whether this influence was exerted by highly civilized Egyptians or by such wider pastoralists as are represented at the present day by the Beja and Somali....The incoming Hamites were pastoral Caucasians – arriving wave after wave – better armed as well as quicker witted than the dark agricultural Negroes."

Following Giuseppe Sergi's (1901) classification of the Hamites, Seligman divides the Hamites into two groups: (a) "Eastern Hamites" and (b) "Northern Hamites". The former include the "ancient and modern Egyptians... the Beja, the Berberines (Barbara and Nubians), the Galla, the Somali, the Danakil and... Ethiopians". The latter branch includes the Berbers and the "Taureg and Tibu of the Sahara, the Fulbe of Western Sudan and the extinct Guanche of the Canary Islands".

Seligman acknowledged varying degrees of Negroid admixture among the Hamitic groups, but emphasized throughout his major works the essential racial and cultural unity of the various Hamitic peoples. In his Some Aspects of the Hamitic Problem in the Anglo-Egyptian Sudan (1913), he writes that the Northern and Eastern Hamitic "groups shade into each other, and in many parts a Negro admixture has taken place, nevertheless, culturally if not always physically, either division stands apart from its fellow." The Hamites in general, and the Northern Hamites in particular, he asserted, have close "kinship with the European representatives of the Mediterranean race". Drawing from Coon, Seligman also discusses fairer features observed among a minority of Berbers or Northern Hamites, such as lighter skin, golden beards and blue eyes. Races of Africa, however, notably questions the belief held by some anthropologists in the early 20th century that these fairer traits, such as blondism, were introduced by a Nordic variety.

In addition, Seligman laid stress on the common descent of Hamites with Semites, writing that "there is no doubt that the Hamites and Semites must be regarded as modifications of an original stock, and that their differentiation did not take place so very long ago, evidence for this statement being furnished by the persistence of common cultural traits and linguistic affinities. Physically their relationship is obvious".

Since the 1960s, the Hamitic hypothesis and other theories of race science have become discredited in science, widely.

=== Races of Africa ===
Races of Africa (1930) upon publication received positive reviews. It was considered to be the first major published work in English on the ethnography of Africa, and was widely regarded as an "ethnological classic". Anthropologist Alfred L. Kroeber in a review praises the book for its "vast amount of accurate information" in such concise form. The first book edition was published by Home University Library and later in the same year by Oxford University Press. It was used in many universities, in history and anthropology classes, through to the late 1970s. Races of Africa was revised four times; Seligman published a second revised edition in 1939, a year before his death: "Additions to the original edition published nine years ago include a note on the importance of the Boskop skull…an account of the Pygmies as described by Paul Schebesta and a slight alteration in the classification of the linguistic stocks of the Guinea Coast". A revised third edition appeared in 1957, and was later reprinted to meet demand in 1959 and 1961. This edition is notable as it was "brought up to date" by more than a dozen anthropologists, and was very well received. A final revised edition was published in 1966, and the book was republished up to 1979.

== Selected works ==
- Melanesians of British New Guinea (1910)
- The Veddas (1911), with Brenda Seligman
- Some Aspects of the Hamitic Problem in the Anglo-Egyptian Sudan (1913)
- Races of Africa (1930, 1939, 1957, 1966)
- The Pagan Tribes of Nilotic Sudan (London: Routledge, 1932), with Brenda Seligman

His and Brenda Seligman's papers are held at the London School of Economics.
