= British Journal of Psychology =

- Discipline: Psychology
- Language: English
- Edited by: Romina Palermo

Publication details
- Former name(s): British Journal of Psychology: General Section
- History: 1904-present
- Publisher: Wiley-Blackwell
- Frequency: Quarterly
- Impact factor: 3.308 (2018)

Standard abbreviations
- ISO 4: Br. J. Psychol.

Indexing
- CODEN: BJSGAE
- ISSN: 0007-1269 (print); 2044-8295 (web)
- LCCN: 58037255
- OCLC no.: 470177597

Links
- Journal homepage; Online access; Online archive

The British Journal of Psychology is a quarterly peer-reviewed psychology journal. It was established in 1904 and is published by Wiley-Blackwell on behalf of the British Psychological Society. The editor-in-chief is Stefan R. Schweinberger (University of Jena). According to the Journal Citation Reports, the journal has a 2018 impact factor of 3.308, ranking it 20th out of 137 journals in the category "Psychology, Multidisciplinary".
