= Forgery =

Process of making, adapting, or imitating objects to deceive

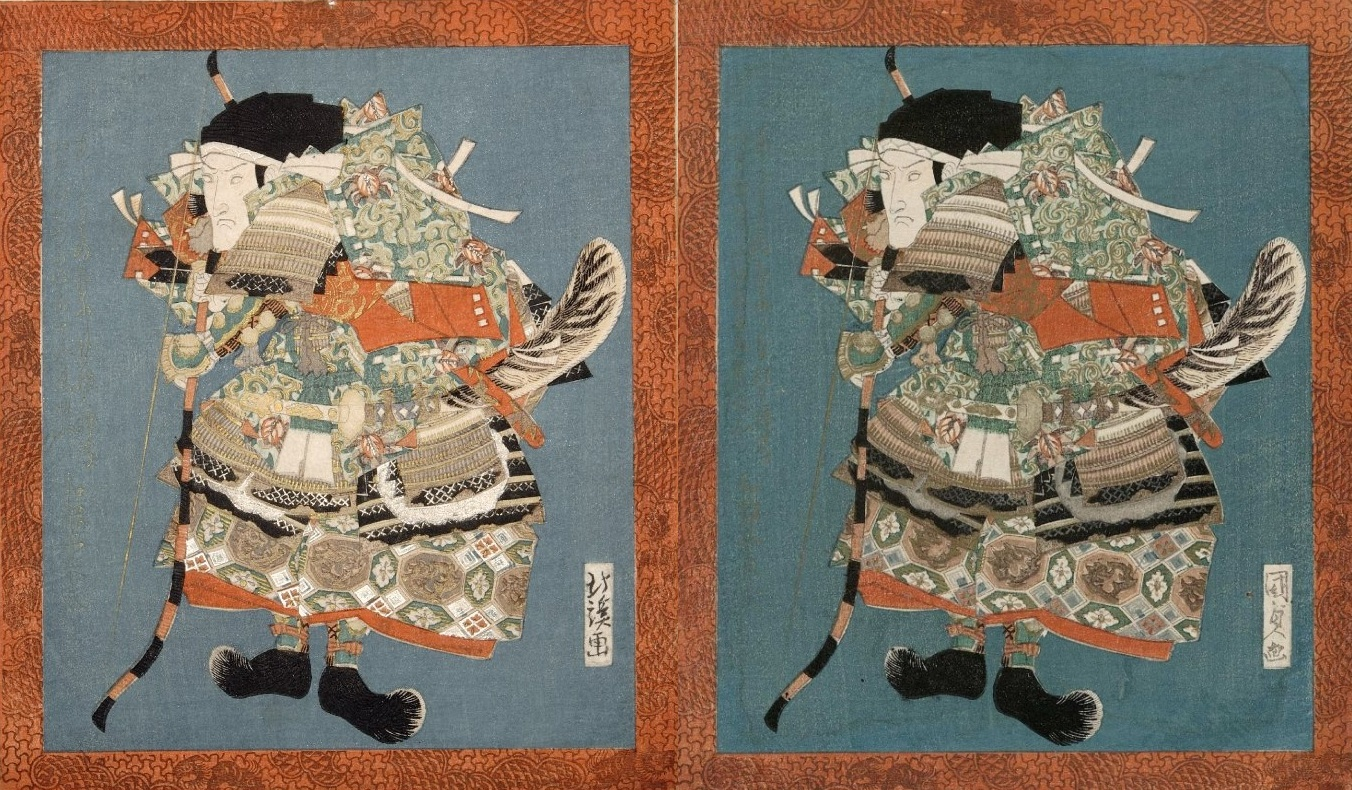
On the right, real sheet of a theatre surimono by Kunisada; on the left, a faked signature of Hokkei, c. 1825.

Forgery is a white-collar crime that generally consists of the false making or material alteration of a legal instrument with the specific intent to defraud. Tampering with a certain legal instrument may be forbidden by law in some jurisdictions but such an offense is not related to forgery unless the tampered legal instrument was actually used in the course of the crime to defraud another person or entity. Copies, studio replicas, and reproductions are not considered forgeries, though they may later become forgeries through knowing and willful misrepresentations.

Forging money or currency is more often called counterfeiting. But consumer goods may also be counterfeits if they are not manufactured or produced by the designated manufacturer or producer given on the label or flagged by the trademark symbol. When the object forged is a record or document it is often called a false document.

This usage of "forgery" does not derive from metalwork done at a blacksmith's forge, but it has a parallel history. A sense of "to counterfeit" is already in the Anglo-French verb forger, meaning "falsify".

A forgery is essentially concerned with a produced or altered object. Where the prime concern of a forgery is less focused on the object itself – what it is worth or what it "proves" – than on a tacit statement of criticism that is revealed by the reactions the object provokes in others, then the larger process is a hoax. In a hoax, a rumor or a genuine object planted in a concocted situation, may substitute for a forged physical object.

The similar crime of fraud is the crime of deceiving another, including through the use of objects obtained through forgery. Forgery is one of the techniques of fraud, including identity theft. Forgery is one of the threats addressed by security engineering.

In the 16th century, imitators of Albrecht Dürer's style of printmaking improved the market for their own prints by signing them "AD", making them forgeries. In the 20th century the art market made forgeries highly profitable. There are widespread forgeries of especially valued artists, such as drawings originally by Pablo Picasso, Paul Klee, and Henri Matisse.

A special case of double forgery is the forging of Vermeer's paintings by Han van Meegeren, and in its turn the forging of Van Meegeren's work by his son Jacques van Meegeren.

== Criminal law ==
=== England and Wales and Northern Ireland ===
In England and Wales and Northern Ireland, forgery is an offence under section 1 of the Forgery and Counterfeiting Act 1981, which provides:

A person is guilty of forgery if he makes a false instrument, with the intention that he or another shall use it to induce somebody to accept it as genuine, and by reason of so accepting it to do or not to do some act to his own or any other person’s prejudice.

"Instrument" is defined by section 8, "makes" and "false" by section 9, and "induce" and "prejudice" by section 10.

Forgery is triable either way. A person guilty of forgery is liable, on conviction on indictment, to imprisonment for a term not exceeding ten years, or, on summary conviction, to imprisonment for a term not exceeding six months, or to a fine not exceeding the statutory maximum, or to both.

For offences akin to forgery, see English criminal law#Forgery, personation, and cheating.

The common law offence of forgery is abolished for all purposes not relating to offences committed before the commencement of the Forgery and Counterfeiting Act 1981.

=== Scotland ===
Forgery is not an official offence under the law of Scotland, except in cases where statute provides otherwise.

The Forgery of Foreign Bills Act 1803 was repealed in full by the Statute Law (Repeals) Act 2013.

=== Republic of Ireland ===
In the Republic of Ireland, forgery is an offence under section 25(1) of the Criminal Justice (Theft and Fraud Offences) Act 2001 which provides:

A person is guilty of forgery if he or she makes a false instrument with the intention that it shall be used to induce another person to accept it as genuine and, by reason of so accepting it, to do some act, or to make some omission, to the prejudice of that person or any other person.

A person guilty of forgery is liable, on conviction on indictment, to imprisonment for a term not exceeding ten years, or to a fine, or to both.

Any offence at common law of forgery is abolished. The abolition of a common law offence of forgery does not affect proceedings for any such offence committed before its abolition.

Except as regards offences committed before the commencement of the Criminal Justice (Theft and Fraud Offences) Act 2001 and except where the context otherwise requires, without prejudice to section 65(4)(a) of that Act, references to forgery must be construed in accordance with the provisions of that Act.

=== Canada ===
Forgery is an offence under sections 366, 367 and 368 of the Canadian Criminal Code. The offence is a hybrid offence, subject to a maximum prison sentence of:

- if tried summarily: 6 months
- if tried on indictment: 10 years

=== United States ===
Forgery is a crime in all jurisdictions within the United States, both state and federal. Most states, including California, describe forgery as occurring when a person alters a written document "with the intent to defraud, knowing that he or she has no authority to do so." The written document usually has to be an instrument of legal significance. Punishments for forgery vary widely. In California, forgery for an amount under $950 can result in misdemeanor charges and no jail time, while a forgery involving a loss of over $500,000 can result in three years in prison for the forgery plus a five-year "conduct enhancement" for the amount of the loss, yielding eight years in prison. In Connecticut, forgery in the Third Degree, which is a class B misdemeanor is punishable by up to 6 months in jail, a $1000 fine, and probation; forgery in the First Degree, which is a class C felony, is punishable by a maximum 10 years in prison, a fine of up to $10,000 fine, or both.

=== Russia ===
In Russian, the forgery of an official document is called Russian: подлог, romanized: podlog.

The law of the Russian Empire, distinguished documental forgery of governmental documents (further classified into subcategories: fogreries of decrees, passports, etc.) and of private documents (wills, negotiable instruments, etc.

The Law of the Soviet Union distinguished documental forgery by a private person and by an official.

According to the Criminal Code of Russia, Article 292 "Official forgery" i.e., forgery of official documents by an official, civil servant or a municipal employee (Russian: служебный подлог) is a criminal offense punishable by a fine of up to 500,000 rubles, forced labor, or imprisonment for up to four years.

== Civil law ==
As to the effect, in the United Kingdom, of a forged signature on a bill of exchange, see section 24 of the Bills of Exchange Act 1882.

== In popular culture ==
- The 1839 novel by Honoré de Balzac, Pierre Grassou, concerns an artist who lives off forgeries.
- Alexander Howland Smith was a prominent forger in the 1880's, including of the writings of Robert Burns' Scottish poetry.
- The Orson Welles documentary F for Fake concerns both art and literary forgery. For the movie, Welles intercut footage of Elmyr de Hory, an art forger, and Clifford Irving, who wrote an "authorized" autobiography of Howard Hughes that had been revealed to be a hoax. While forgery is the ostensible subject of the film, it also concerns art, film making, storytelling and the creative process.
- The 1966 heist comedy film How to Steal a Million centers around Nicole Bonnet (Audrey Hepburn) attempting to steal a fake Cellini made by her grandfather.
- The 1964 children's book Charlie and the Chocolate Factory written by Roald Dahl revealed the "golden ticket" in Japan was a forgery.
- The 1972 novel by Irving Wallace, The Word concerns archaeological forgery, the finding and translation of a supposed lost gospel by James the Just, close relative of Jesus Christ, as part of a large project to be published as a new Bible that would inspire a Christian revival, but which is possibly a forged document.
- The 2002 film Catch Me If You Can, directed by Steven Spielberg, is based on the claims of Frank Abagnale, a con man who allegedly stole over US$2.5 million through forgery, imposture and other frauds, which are dramatized in the film. His career in crime lasted six years from 1963 to 1969. The veracity of most of Abagnale's claims has been questioned.
- The graphic art novel The Last Coiner, authored by Peter M. Kershaw, is based on the exploits of the 18th century English counterfeiters, the Cragg Vale Coiners, who were sentenced to execution by hanging at Tyburn.

== See also ==
- Art forgery
- Authentication
- J. S. G. Boggs American artist
- Counterfeiting
  - coins
  - currency
  - medicine
  - watches
  - postage stamps
- Digital signature forgery
- Epigraphy
- Literary forgery
- Phishing
- Questioned document examination
- Replica
- Signature forgery
- United States Secret Service
- White-collar crime

== Sources ==
- Cohon, Robert. Discovery & Deceit: archaeology & the forger's craft Kansas: Nelson-Atkins Museum, 1996
- Muscarella, Oscar. The Lie Became Great: the forgery of Ancient Near Eastern cultures, 2000
- "Imaginary Images" in Detecting the Truth: Fakes, Forgeries and Trickery at Library and Archives Canada
