= Union Street (novel) =

1982 novel by Pat Barker

- First edition
- Author: Pat Barker
- Cover artist: Patricia Robson
- Language: English
- Publisher: Virago Press
- Publication date: 13 May 1982
- Media type: Print
- ISBN: 0-86068-282-X
- Followed by: Blow Your House Down

Union Street is the first novel by English author Pat Barker, published by Virago Press in 1982. It describes the lives of seven working-class women living on Union Street and how they respond to the changes brought about by deindustrialisation. It is set in northeastern England during the 1970s. The 1990 movie Stanley & Iris is a loose adaptation of the novel.

== Plot summary ==
The novel is divided into chapters each covering the same few months but centring on the life of one of seven working-class women living the area of Union Street in northeastern England. The characters range in age and circumstance, Alice Bell is in her seventies and dying whereas Kelly Brown is eleven, but all of them face struggles and poverty. The book begins with the character of eleven-year-old Kelly Brown and deals with her rape and the response of Kelly and her community to the rape. When the people on the street find out about her rape they will not deal with it openly with her; instead, they react with general sympathy, in the way they would have if she had been ill, but both the adults and children talk about the incident behind her back. Kelly becomes increasingly isolated, distrustful of adults and no longer feeling at home with the other children; she spends an increasing amount of time by herself at night in the neighbourhood. As time passes Kelly's silence turns to anger, responding to the trauma of the events with acts of rebellion and violence, such as cutting her hair short and breaking the windows of a school.

== Significance and reception ==
Although Union Street was "highly praised" by critics, it also drew unfavourable comments due to its subject matter and setting. The Guardian reported that one interviewer was appalled by the realistic coverage of "menstruation, childbirth and back-street abortion" and declared the book to be "far too gynaecological".

== Development ==
During the 1970s Barker wrote three manuscripts for what she describes as "middle-class novels" which got positive responses from publishers but were all rejected for publication. Due to these rejections she thought her books would probably never be published so felt free to work on Union Street, a book which she "didn't think could be published". This opinion was backed up by the responses she received which centered on the book being too bleak and depressing In 1978 Barker took part in a writers' workshop run by the Arvon Foundation at Lumb Bank near Heptonstall and met author Angela Carter. Carter read Union Street and encouraged Barker to send the manuscript to the publisher Virago Press. Virago, a specialist in women's literature, accepted the book and it was published in 1982.

== Awards and nominations ==
Union Street won the Fawcett Society book prize in 1983. It was among the runners up for the Guardian Fiction Prize.

== Adaptations ==
A film loosely adapted from Union Street, called Stanley & Iris, was released in 1989. Unlike the book, the film is a romantic comedy. It features one character in common with the novel, Iris King. The film is set in the US, rather than England, and has none of the realism or language that feature in the book. Iris, in the film, is a widow who with a job in a baked goods factory who meets an illiterate cook in the same factory and falls in love. Many of the events and themes differ between the book and film.
