= Rosemary Tonks =

English poet and author (1928–2014)

Rosemary Tonks (17 October 1928 – 15 April 2014) (Note: In works, anthologies, and other publications that appeared before her death, those that included Tonks' year of birth stated it as "1932".) was an English poet and author. After publishing two poetry collections, six novels, and pieces in numerous media outlets, she disappeared from the public eye following her conversion to fundamentalist Christianity in the 1970s; little was known about her life past that point, until her death.

== Early life and marriage ==
Born Rosemary Desmond Boswell Tonks in Gillingham, Kent, she had a difficult childhood. She was the only child of Gwendoline (née Verdi) and Desmond Tonks. Her father was the nephew of Henry Tonks, the surgeon, painter, and in the 1920s, professor of fine art at Slade. A mechanical engineer, Desmond died of blackwater fever in Africa (Note: In general, available sources are silent on the location in Africa where Desmond Tonks died. One review of the 2016 edition of Tonks' collected works states "Nigeria".) before Rosemary was born. She spent her early years in and out of different schools and children's homes. Already suffering in her childhood from troubling eye conditions, Tonks was nevertheless an enthusiastic reader and writer from a young age.

Tonks attended boarding school at Wentworth college in Bournemouth. While still at school, she wrote the story which would form her authorial debut when BBC radio broadcast it in 1946. She published children's stories while a teenager, the first in 1946, which she also illustrated: On Wooden Wings: The Adventures of Webster.

In 1949, aged 20, she married Michael Lightband (who became a senior partner in a consulting structural engineering practice and later, a financier), and the couple moved to Karachi for his work, where she began to write poetry. Attacks of paratyphoid, contracted in Calcutta, and of polio, contracted in Karachi, forced a return to England. She lived in Paris in 1952–1953, before returning to London where she settled with her husband in Hampstead. They later divorced and lived several doors from each other for some years.

== Career ==
Tonks worked for the BBC, writing stories and reviewing poetry for the BBC European Service. She published poems in collections and The Observer, the New Statesman, Transatlantic Review, London Magazine, Encounter, and Poetry Review; she read on the BBC's Third Programme.

Her work appears in many anthologies, including: Anthology of Twentieth-Century British and Irish Poetry (2001, edited by Keith Tuma); British Poetry since 1945; The Firebox: Poetry in Britain and Ireland after 1945 (1998, edited by Sean O'Brien); and the Oxford Book of Twentieth Century English Verse.

Tonks published two collections, Notes on Cafés and Bedrooms (Putnam, 1963) and Iliad of Broken Sentences (Bodley Head, 1967), and after both books went out of print following each publisher's decision to axe their poetry lists, she was discussing a selected edition of her work with John Moat and John Fairfax's Phoenix Press in Newbury from 1976 until 1980, when the project was abandoned following her conversion to a puritanical form of Christianity. Little was known publicly about her subsequent life past that point. As Andrew Motion wrote in 2004, she "Disappeared! What happened? Because I admire her poems, I've been trying to find out for years... no trace of her seems to survive – apart from the writing she left behind." In the 30-minute BBC Radio 4 Lost Voices documentary, "The Poet Who Vanished", broadcast 29 March 2009, Brian Patten observed, from the literary world's perspective, she'd "evaporated into air like the Cheshire cat"; Tonks had disappeared from public view and was living a hermetic existence, refusing telephone and personal calls from friends, family and the media.

== Withdrawal from literary life ==
Following her death in April 2014, Neil Astley published an obituary and then an article in the Guardian, followed by his introduction to the 2014 Bloodaxe Books edition of her collected poetry and selected prose, Bedouin of the London Evening, in which he revealed the background to her "disappearance", how she had "turned her back on the literary world after a series of personal tragedies and medical crises which made her question the value of literature and embark on a restless, self-torturing spiritual quest". Her mental and physical health deteriorated following an emergency operation on New Year's Day 1978 to save her eyesight. Tonks characterised her dual detached retinas as her "reward" for "10 long years searching for God", believing they had been acquired through her practice of extreme Taoist eye exercises. Taoism had only been the most recent in a series of spiritual explorations with mediums, healers, spiritualists and Sufis. These had begun in 1968, when she rejected Christianity following the sudden death of her mother and her apparently unwanted divorce.

In the aftermath of the surgery she was left almost blind for the next few years, and in 1979 she moved to Bournemouth to recuperate, to the home of her aunt, Dorothy (a "double aunt", who was both Gwendoline's sister and married to Desmond's brother, Myles). In 1980 she moved into a house behind the seafront where she lived alone for the next 33 years, using her former married name, Rosemary Lightband. In 1981 she made the decision to "confront her profession" and burnt the manuscript of an unpublished novel, apparently in the belief that the work was spiritually dangerous. She had, not long before, in the October of the same year, also burnt a large number of valuable Oriental artefacts that had been bequeathed to her many years before, on the basis that they were the cause of supernatural ill-effects. That October she travelled to Jerusalem and was baptised near the River Jordan on 17 October 1981, the day before her 53rd birthday. "Obliterating her former identity as the writer Rosemary Tonks, she dated her new life from that 'second birth'", according to Astley, and thereafter she never read any books apart from the Bible.

== Character of her poetry ==
Tonks's poems offer a stylised view of an urban literary subculture around 1960, full of hedonism and decadence. The poet seems to veer from the ennui of Charles Baudelaire to exuberant disbelief at modern civilisation. There are illicit love affairs in seedy hotels and scenes of café life across Europe and the Middle East; there are sage reflections on men who are shy with women. She often targets the pathetic pretensions of writers and intellectuals. Yet she is often buoyant and chatty, bemused rather than critical, even self-deprecating.

She believed poetry should look good on a printed page as well as sound good when read. Poet and essayist Dennis O'Driscoll quotes Tonks in support of his own position on the visual importance of poetry in print: "There is an excitement for the eye in a poem on the page which is completely different from the ear's reaction". Of her style, she said "I have developed a visionary modern lyric, and, for it, an idiom in which I can write lyrically, colloquially, and dramatically. My subject is city life – with its sofas, hotel corridors, cinemas, underworlds, cardboard suitcases, self-willed buses, banknotes, soapy bathrooms, newspaper-filled parks; and its anguish, its enraged excitement, its great lonely joys."

Her poem, "The Sofas, Fogs and Cinemas" ends:

—All this sitting about in cafés to calm down
Simply wears me out. And their idea of literature!
The idiotic cut of the stanzas; the novels, full up, gross.

I have lived it, and I know too much.
My café nerves are breaking me
With black, exhausting information.

== Novels ==
Writing novels in a highly personal style that at times approached the tone of Evelyn Waugh in its cynical observations of urban living, Tonks as a novelist had a mixed critical reception at best, although her critics admit that her grasp of the English language and her sense of London are sharp. The anthologist, Keith Tuma, called these long-form works "poetic novels". Her novels are a kind of fictional autobiography in which she plays not only the leading role but one or two supporting roles as well. She includes incidents and experiences directly from her past, often with only a thin fictional veil to disguise them. Some critics felt this was a fault and labelled the autobiographical dimension of her writing "feminine" in a pejorative sense; others decided her directness was invigorating and showed the uniqueness of her voice, making for a lively, distinct fictional world. Whatever the verdict, Tonks' novels deal with aspects of her life up to 1972, when her last work was published. Her fiction, in particular, moved from a dissatisfaction with urban living found in both her collections of poetry and in satiric novels such as The Bloater and Businessmen as Lovers to a pronounced loathing of middle to upper-middle class materialism in her later work. Her distaste for materialism meant that Tonks also developed an interest in the symbolist movement, which eventually led her to a conception of spirituality as the only alternative to materialism. This embrace of what she called "the invisible world" may have ultimately led her to distrust the act of writing itself, and caused her to abandon writing as a career.

== Assessment of her work ==
Critics praised Tonks as a cosmopolitan poet of considerable innovation and originality. She has been described as one of the very few modern English poets who has genuinely tried to learn something from modern French poets such as Paul Éluard about symbolism and surrealism. Al Alvarez said Notes on Cafés and Bedrooms showed "an original sensibility in motion". Edward Lucie-Smith said "the movements of an individual awareness – often rather self-conscious in its singularity – supply the themes of most of her work." Daisy Goodwin commented on her poem, "Story of a Hotel Room", about infidelity: "This poem should be read by anyone about to embark on an affair thinking that it's just a fling. It is much harder than you know to separate sex from love."

In The New Yorker, writer and critic Audrey Wollen describes a substantial comic achievement—this is from a 2023 Tonks reassessment: "All of The Bloater, however—every single sentence—is funny."

A mural of Tonks was included in a series of murals displayed in Gillingham between 2022-2023 as part of Medway Libraries' Circle of Six project.

== Publications ==
=== Poetry ===
- Notes on Cafés and Bedrooms (Putnam, 1963)
- Iliad of Broken Sentences (Bodley Head, 1967)
- Bedouin of the London evening: Collected poems & selected prose. Hexham, Great Britain: Bloodaxe Books. 2014. ISBN 978-1780372389.

=== Novels ===
- Opium Fogs (Putnam, 1963)
- Emir (Adam Books, 1963 or 1964)
- The Bloater (Bodley Head, 1968); reissued in 2022 by Vintage Classics with a new introduction by Stewart Lee, and also as a Penguin audiobook read by Florence Howard
- Businessmen as Lovers (Bodley Head, 1969); US title, Love Among the Operators (1970)
- The Way Out of Berkeley Square (Bodley Head, 1970)
- The Halt during the Chase (Bodley Head, 1972)

=== Children's books ===
- On Wooden Wings: The Adventures of Webster (John Murray, 1948)
- Wild Sea Goose (John Murray, 1951)
