= Wendy Beckett =

British Catholic nun and art historian (1930–2018)

Sister Wendy
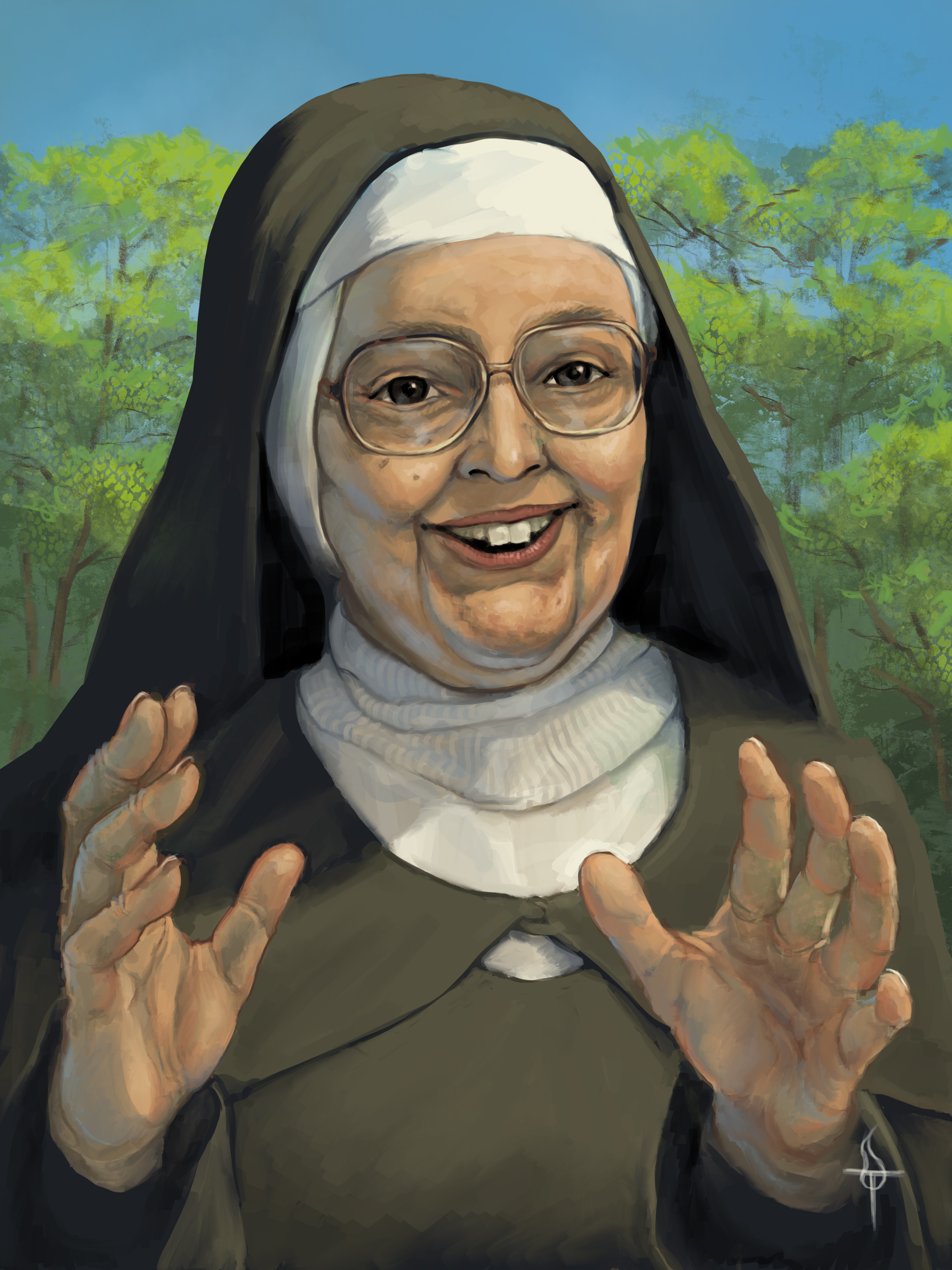
- Portrait, 2022
- Born: Wendy Mary Beckett; 25 February 1930; Johannesburg, Union of South Africa
- Died: 26 December 2018 (aged 88); Quidenham, Norfolk, England
- Education: St Anne's College, Oxford (BA)
- Occupations: Religious sister; Art historian
- Known for: Several BBC art history documentaries

Wendy Mary Beckett (25 February 1930 – 26 December 2018), better known as Sister Wendy, was a British Catholic religious sister and art historian who became known internationally during the 1990s when she presented a series of BBC television documentaries on the history of art. Her programmes, such as Sister Wendy's Odyssey and Sister Wendy's Grand Tour, often drew a 25 percent share of the British viewing audience. In 1997 she made her debut on US public television, with The New York Times describing her as "a sometime hermit who is fast on her way to becoming the most unlikely and famous art critic in the history of television."

Beckett was formerly a member of the Sisters of Notre Dame de Namur.

== Early life and Notre Dame sisters ==
=== Early life ===
Beckett was born in Johannesburg in the Union of South Africa, but was later raised in Edinburgh, Scotland, where her father was studying medicine. In 1946, she entered the Sisters of Notre Dame de Namur, a Catholic congregation of religious sisters dedicated to education. She was sent to England where she completed her novitiate and then studied at St Anne's College, Oxford, where she was awarded a congratulatory first class honours degree in English literature. J. R. R. Tolkien was president of her final examinations board and asked her to stay on at the university, an invitation which she declined. From childhood Beckett suffered from a weak heart and later had to give up teaching, after having epileptic seizures brought on by stress.

Outside her academic work, she lived in a convent which maintained the strict code of silence typical in convents prior to the changes following the Second Vatican Council (1962–1965). After attending the Notre Dame College of Education in Liverpool and earning a teaching diploma in 1954, she returned to South Africa to teach at Notre Dame Convent, a school for girls in Constantia, Cape Town, where she taught English and Latin. Later she moved to Johannesburg where she was appointed the superior of the local convent, while she also lectured at the University of the Witwatersrand.

=== Return to England ===
In 1970, health problems forced Beckett to abandon teaching and to return to England. She obtained papal permission to leave her congregation and to become a consecrated virgin and hermit. She began living in a caravan on the grounds of a Carmelite monastery at Quidenham, Norfolk, and her caravan was later replaced by a mobile home. Besides having received the Carmelite prioress and a nun who brought her provisions, she dedicated her life to solitude and prayer, but allotted two hours of work per day to earn her living.

== Art and media career ==
Beckett spent many years translating Medieval Latin scripts before deciding, in 1980, to pursue art. Her first book, Contemporary Women Artists, was published in 1988. Sister Wendy Contemplates Saint Paul in Art was published in 2008 to celebrate the Year of Saint Paul. In May 2009, Encounters with God: In Quest of the Ancient Icons of Mary was published, which follows Beckett's pilgrimage to see the earliest icons of Mary which had survived the Byzantine Iconoclasm. Beckett continued writing about her interest in icons in the second volume of her Sister Wendy Contemplates series, published in July 2011. This book, entitled The Iconic Jesus, takes the reader through scenes from the New Testament, accompanied by Beckett's reflections. Her next book, published in 2011, The Christ Journey, consists of her commentaries on the artwork of Greg Tricker.

Beckett required medical treatment as an outpatient at a local hospital. The television chef Delia Smith, a Catholic convert, volunteered to drive her there each week. Smith also drove her around the country to meet the artists when Beckett was writing her book about contemporary women artists. Through this the two became good friends.

Having overheard her commentary while attending an art exhibit, a film crew asked to videotape her. This brought her to the attention of a BBC producer and led, in 1992, to the debut Sister Wendy's Odyssey.

Beckett was often effusively verbal in her descriptions of the human body in paintings, both male and female. In view of her religious state, this came as a surprise to some viewers. She insisted, however, on describing the depiction of the human anatomy in art when it was called for, stating that "God did not make a mistake when He created the human body, so I am not making a mistake by describing it." "None of the Sisters has ever raised an eyebrow at anything I've said or written because they're not cramped by this false idea that sexuality is something wrong [...] God looked at His creation and thought it was good, thought it was beautiful, we're made in the image of God, and there's nothing amiss in any part of the human body."

== Works ==
Beckett narrated the following documentaries:

- Sister Wendy's Odyssey (1992)
- Sister Wendy's Grand Tour (1994)
- Sister Wendy's Pains of Glass (1995)
- Sister Wendy's Story of Painting (1996)
- Saints with Sister Wendy (1997)
- Sister Wendy's American Collection (2001)
- Sister Wendy at the Norton Simon Museum (2002)

In 2006 she narrated an audio commentary for tourists to the Sistine Chapel at the Vatican:

- Sister Wendy's Sistine Chapel Artineraries Tour (2006)

Additionally, she features in the following:

- Sister Wendy in Conversation with Bill Moyers (1997)
- Three appearances on Charlie Rose (3 October 1997; 18 November 1997; 19 September 2000) are available on DVD.
- The Art of Dying (2009) (Dan Cruickshank interviews Sister Wendy on the helpfulness of art in the face of death)
- Churches: How to Read Them (2010) (Richard Taylor and Sister Wendy discuss the intense medieval devotion to the Virgin Mary and its effect on Reformation)
- Treasures of Heaven (2011) (Andrew Graham-Dixon talks to Sister Wendy about relics and reliquaries)
- Sister Wendy and the Art of the Gospel (25 December 2012)

As a television presenter, she is known for having had a rhotacism, a speech impediment which affected her pronunciation of Rs.

=== Other media ===
A musical, Postcards from God: The Sister Wendy Musical, written by Marcus Reeves and Beccy Smith was performed at the Jermyn Street Theatre in the West End in 2007 and Hackney Empire Studio Theatre in 2008.

In December 2012 Sister Wendy was the guest for BBC Radio 4's Desert Island Discs. Her favourite choice was "Serenade" (D 957 No. 4) by Franz Schubert, her chosen book was "an enormous book of logical puzzles", and her luxury item was a "refrigerated tabernacle".

In 1993, Sister Wendy recorded an abridged audio version of Revelations of Divine Love by Julian of Norwich. This recording, from the translation by M. L. Del Mastro and adapted for Sister Wendy by Donna K. Triggs, was finally released as a CD in 2021, entitled Revelations of Divine Love by Julian of Norwich read by Sister Wendy Beckett.

== Death ==
Beckett died on 26 December 2018 at the Carmelite Monastery in Quidenham, Norfolk. She was 88.

== Publications ==
- Dearest Sister Wendy ... A Surprising Story of Faith and Friendship (2022)
- The Christ Journey – the art of Greg Tricker (2011)
- Sister Wendy Contemplates the Iconic Jesus (2011)
- Encounters With God: In Quest of Ancient Icons of Mary (2009)
- Sister Wendy Contemplates Saint Paul in Art (2008)
- Bernard of Clairvaux: Sermons for Advent And the Christmas Season, with John Leinenweber (Editor), Irene Edmonds (Translator), Wendy Mary Beckett (Translator), Conrad Greenia (Translator) (2008)
- Sister Wendy on Prayer (2007)
- Sister Wendy's Meditations on the Mysteries of Our Faith (2007)
- Speaking to the Heart: 100 Favourite Poems (2006)
- Sky-blue Is the Sapphire' Crimson the Rose: Stillpoint of Desire in John of Forde by John, abbot of Forde, translated by Wendy Beckett (2006)
- Joy Lasts: On the Spiritual in Art (2006)
- Sister Wendy's Impressionist Masterpieces (2001)
- Sister Wendy's American Masterpieces (2001)
- Sister Wendy's American Collection (2000)
- In the Midst of Chaos, Peace (with Mary J. Dorcy and Dan Paulos) (2000)
- Sister Wendy's Book of Muses (with Justin Pumfrey) (2000)
- Sister Wendy's 1,000 Masterpieces (with Patricia Wright) (1999)
- My Favourite Things: 75 Works of Art from Around the World (1999)
- Sister Wendy's Nativity (1998)
- Inner Life: A Fellow Traveler's Guide to Prayer (by David Torkington; foreword by Sister Wendy) (1998)
- Sister Wendy's Odyssey: A Journey of Artistic Discovery (1998)
- Sister Wendy's Book of Meditations (1998)
- Sister Wendy's Book of Saints (1998)
- The Mystery of Love: Saints in Art Through the Ages (1998)
- Sister Wendy's Story of Christmas: Adventures in Art (1997)
- Sister Wendy in Conversation with Bill Moyers: The Complete Conversation (edited by Karen Johnson) (1997)
- The Wisdom of the Apostles (compiled by Philip Law; introduction by Sister Wendy) (1997)
- The Duke and the Peasant: Life in the Middle Ages (with Jean De Berry) (1997)
- Max Beckmann and the Self (1997)
- Sister Wendy's Grand Tour: Discovering Europe's Great Art (1996)
- Pains of Glass: The Story of the Passion from King's College Chapel, Cambridge (with George Pattison) (1996)
- Sister Wendy's Meditations: Meditations on Joy (1995)
- Sister Wendy's Meditations: Meditations on Love (1995)
- Sister Wendy's Meditations: Meditations on Peace (1995)
- Sister Wendy's Meditations: Meditations on Silence (1995)
- A Child's Book of Prayer in Art (1995)
- The Story of Painting (1994)
- The Gaze of Love: Meditations on Art and Spiritual Transformation (1994)
- The Mystical Now: Art and the Sacred (1993)
- Contemporary Women Artists (1988)
