= The Man Who Wasn't There =

The Man Who Wasn't There may refer to:

== Film ==
- The Man Who Wasn't There (1983 film), an American 3-D comedy
- The Man Who Wasn't There (1987 film), a French thriller based on the Roderick MacLeish novel
- The Man Who Wasn't There (2001 film), a Coen brothers thriller

== Literature ==
- The Man Who Wasn't There (Gilbert novel), 1937
- The Man Who Wasn't There (MacLeish novel), 1976
- The Man Who Wasn't There (Barker novel), 1988

== See also ==
- "Antigonish" (poem), also known as "The Little Man Who Wasn't There", a poem by Hughes Mearns
