= John Moat =

Roger John Frothingham Moat (11 September 1936 – 16 September 2014) was a British poet, and co-founder, with John Fairfax, of the Arvon Foundation in 1968.

== Early life and background ==
He was born in India, the son of John Henry Frothingham Moat (1907–1942), known as "Jeff", an officer in the Green Howards killed in action in British Malaya; like his father, he was educated at Radley College and Exeter College, Oxford. His mother was Norrie Fyans Fenwick of Dunedin, daughter of Herbert Fenwick, who married Moat in 1932.

== In England ==
Around 1939, the Moat family, comprising also Norrie and John Moat's sister (born 1932), moved to England. They lived on the edge of Dartmoor in a converted mill, between Buckfastleigh and Combe. Norrie Moat married again, in 1949, to Lt.-Col. Tom Anderson Peddie DSO, a retired soldier of the Green Howards, as his second wife, and died in 1971 at Hambledon, Hampshire, England. Peddie's first wife, from a marriage in 1927, was Beryl Boxer, sister of C. R. Boxer. They were divorced in the late 1930s, so she could marry his friend Miles Smeeton in 1938.

Before entering Exeter College, Oxford in 1956 to read English, Moat studied in France under the caricaturist Edmond Xavier Kapp. Through Kapp he had an introduction to the literary agent David Higham. At Exeter College he was taught by Nevill Coghill and Jonathan Wordsworth.

Moat's stepfather died in 1958; and at the beginning of 1959 The Tatler reported the wedding from The New House, Hambledon, of his sister Sally to an army officer, Capt. Harold W. E. Hosking of the Royal Artillery. Aged 24, Moat bought the disused Crenham Mill on the coast near Hartland, Devon. At the time it was "semi-derelict" and lacking basic services. It became his long-term home. In 1979 he was instrumental in Satish Kumar and his family moving to the area.

== Writing and creative writing ==
Moat left Oxford in 1960. He had decided to write as a career, but lacked a starting point. He took on an "apprenticeship" with the South African poet John Howland Beaumont. He worked as a teacher and librarian. He replaced around 1960 the older Devonian John Fairfax, a pub acquaintance and future collaborator, as a teacher at Brockhurst and Marlston House School.

In 1967, Moat discussed "poetic training" with Fairfax's uncle George Barker; and in 1968 he and Fairfax gave the first residential course that set the style for the Arvon Foundation's events, at an arts centre in Beaford. From 1972 the Foundation ran residential courses at Totleigh Barton, near Sheepwash, Devon; Antoinette Moat bought the property in 1970, and rented it to the Foundation. In 1975 Ted Hughes leased his house at Lumb Bank near Heptonstall in Yorkshire to the Foundation, for a second centre. In the 1980s, Martin Booth wrote "The Arvon Foundation carries on what the 1960s started; that is, the awareness that poetry exists in everyone."

== Death ==
Moat died on 16 September 2014 and was survived by his wife Antoinette and their son and daughter.

== Bibliography ==
Moat wrote a column for Resurgence for 25 years. A selection was published as Best of Didymus (2007), a Resurgence supplement.

=== Poetry ===
- Thunder of Grass (1969)
- 6d per annum
- Skeleton Key
- Fiesta & Fox Reviews His Prophecy (1980)
- Welcombe Overtures Stages of Solar Eclipse & The Ballad of The Leat (1987)
- Firewater & The Miraculous Mandarin
- Practice (1994)

The Peace Prayer beginning "Lead me from death to life, from falsehood to truth" was set to music by Donald Swann, and appears in the 1996 hymnal Worship in Song of the Society of Friends as #301, credited "Anonymous". Swann performed it before that time, and the work is attributed to Kumar and Swann. Lindsay Clarke attributed the words to the collaboration of Satish Kumar with Moat and his wife Antoinette.

=== Novels ===
- Heorot
- Bartonwood
- Mai's Wedding
- The Missing Moon

== Family ==
Moat married in 1966 Robina A. Galletti, known as Antoinette. The couple had two children, Elsbeth Merlin and Ben John.

Antoinette Moat published in 2000 On Two Fronts – a Soldier's Life of Travel, Love and War, a work of family history based on letters of her father Arthur Galletti. Arthur Galletti, the younger, was a son of Arthur Galletti (1877–1967), and was an army officer in the Royal Field Artillery killed in action in North Africa in 1943. Arthur junior had married at Bellary in 1932 to Antoinette's mother, Rachel, in a double wedding with his sister Isabella. His wife was Rachel Cochrane Morgans (1903–1978); she was left money and property in Llangeler in 1932 by her aunt Hannah Morgans. She was the daughter of the Rev. Samuel Morgans who married Adelaide Robina Hickman née Cochrane as her second husband, she being the daughter of John Richard Cochrane and his wife Mary Anne Howden.
