= Andrew Kidd =

Andrew Kidd Hon. FRSL, is a British publisher, who has served as the CEO of the Arvon Foundation since 2019. He co-founded the Folio Prize in 2014, and serves as its chair. In 2023, he was elected an Honorary Fellow of the Royal Society of Literature.

By 2002, Kidd was serving as the editorial director of Penguin Books, and a publisher for Picador, before being promoted to head Macmillan Publishers by 2006. By 2008, he was appointed managing director of Aitken Alexander Associates. In 2014, Kidd left Aitken Alexander Associates, and co-founded the digital reading platform Alexi Books.

In 2015, the Evening Standard named Kidd on the Progress 1000, a list of London's most influential people. As of 2019, Kidd has published works by authors John Updike, Matthew Kneale, Deborah Eisenberg, Jonathan Safran Foer, Edward St Aubyn, Ann Duffy, Jim Crace, Bret Easton Ellis, Jackie Kay, Alan Hollinghurst, Cormac McCarthy, and John Banville.
