= Quicksilver - The Masquerade Macabre =

Studio album by Marcus Reeves
- Released: 5 November 2013
- Recorded: 2010–2013, London
- Genre: Rock, cabaret, pop, glam rock
- Length: 47.22
- Label: Reeves Corner
- Producer: Marcus Reeves, Michael Roulston

Singles from Quicksilver - The Masquerade Macabre
- 1. "Black Tears b/w Mad Bad World " Released: 5 November 2012; 2. "Mistaken Identity b/w Mistaken Identity (Alternative Acoustic Version) " Released: 1 March 2013; 3. "Radio Head " Released: 23 June 2013; 4. "Smoke & Mirrors (Single Version) b/w Alternative Versions " Released: 30 September 2013

Quicksilver – The Masquerade Macabre is the debut solo album by Marcus Reeves released on 5 November 2013. The thirteen tracks were written by Reeves, who also co-produced with his musical collaborator Michael Roulston (Dusty Limits, David Hoyle, Sarah-Louise Young, Harold Sanditen). The album was mixed and mastered by Nick Trepka (Emmy The Great, Speech Debelle, Kieran Leonard, Boy George).

The album is written from the point of view of Reeves' alter-ego, Quicksilver: "The album has a loose storyline that takes in the themes of identity, love, and death. Songs like Behind The Mask and Welcome to the Underworld were written specifically with Quicksilver in mind. The actor created the character from the outside in, but it has then taken over and written the script." Reeves has also described the collection as "a sonic threesome between Aladdin Sane, Hedwig and the Angry Inch (musical) and The Phantom of the Opera (1986 musical)."

== Track listing ==
All music and lyrics written by Marcus Reeves, except track 4: Reeves/Young.

1. Ghosts (3.18)
2. Welcome to the Underworld (3.13)
3. Masquerade (3.09)
4. Smoke & Mirrors (3.07)
5. Radio Head (3.07)
6. The Disappearing Man (4.31)
7. Gone (4.03)
8. Black Tears (4.15)
9. Mistaken Identity (3.17)
10. Behind The Mask (2.54)
11. Mad Bad World (4.09)
12. Quicksilver (3.20)
13. After Life (4.55)

== Release and reception ==
The album was streamed with track by track written commentary by Marcus Reeves at Thisiscabaret.com and launched with a full band show at London's Lost Theatre. The performance was chosen as Time Out Critics Choice, with Cabaret Correspondent Ben Walters giving a positive review: 'It's an impressively ambitious undertaking, wide-ranging in its musical choices, with catchy and moving results; striking in its theatricality, balancing ballsy showmanship with personable charm; and provocative in its take on modern relationships and ego.'

The album was met with positive reviews online, with coverage from Gay Times, Pride Life Magazine, QX Magazine, Sound on Sound and Polari, who chose it as one of their top albums of 2013, alongside titles by mainstream acts including Pet Shop Boys, Kanye West and M.I.A. (rapper).
