= Double Vision (novel) =

2003 novel by Pat Barker

- First edition
- Author: Pat Barker
- Language: English
- Publisher: Hamish Hamilton
- Publication date: 28 Aug 2003
- Publication place: United Kingdom
- Pages: 307
- ISBN: 0-241-14176-1
- Preceded by: Border Crossing
- Followed by: Life Class

Double Vision is a novel by British author Pat Barker. It was first published in 2003 by Hamish Hamilton in the United Kingdom, and by Farrar, Straus and Giroux in the United States. The Observer described the book as a "strongly written, oddly constructed new novel".
