= Postcards from God =

Postcards from God – The Sister Wendy Musical
- Music: Marcus Reeves
- Lyrics: Marcus Reeves
- Book: Marcus Reeves
- Productions: 2007 Jermyn Street Theatre; 2008 Hackney Empire Studio

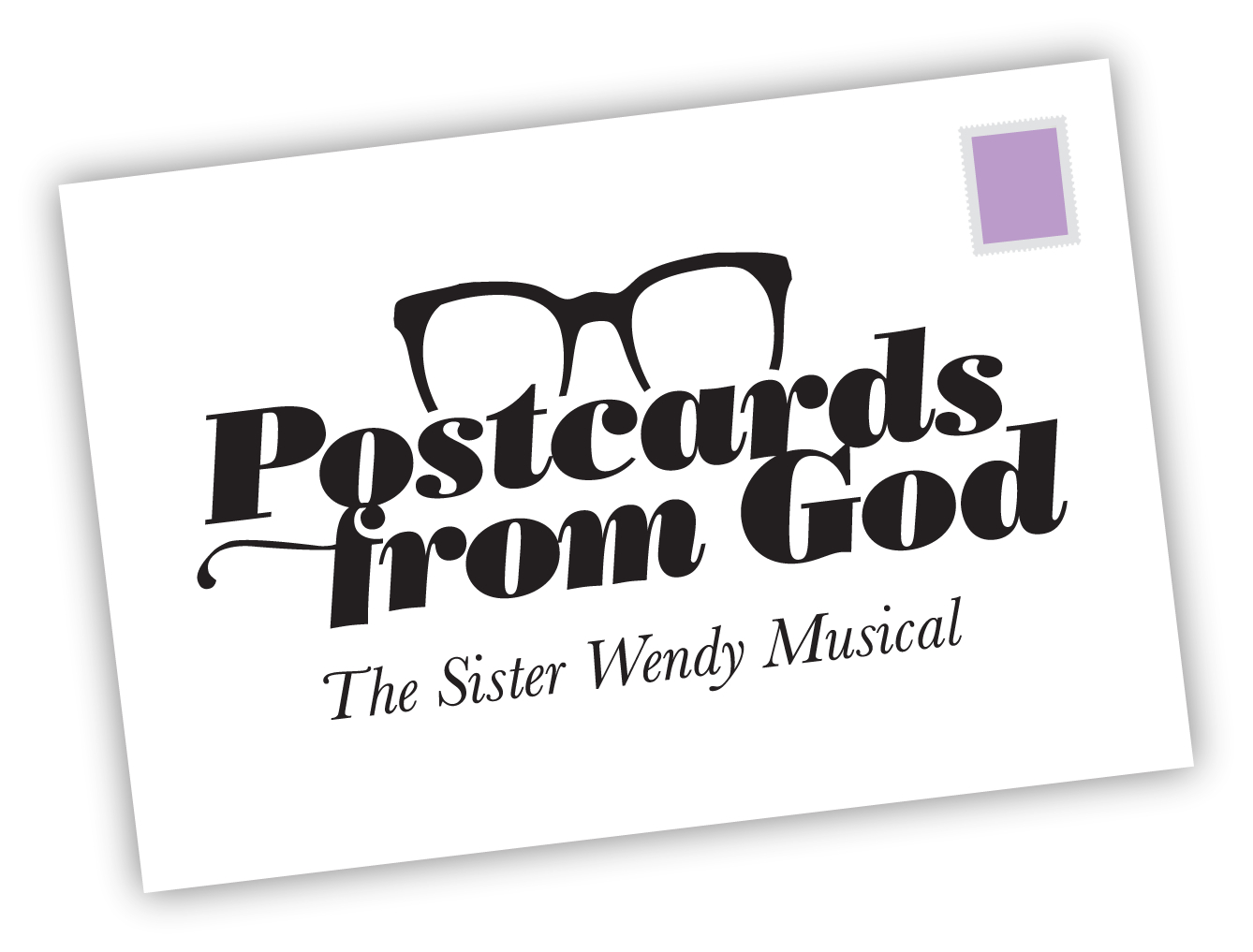

Postcards from God – The Sister Wendy Musical is a British musical with songs, lyrics and book by Marcus Reeves, based on the life and works of Sister Wendy Beckett, the noted art critic and nun of the order of the Sisters of Notre Dame de Namur and later consecrated virgin and hermit.

Postcards from God began as a series of cabaret performances at Battersea Arts Centre in 2004 and is the story of art expert and writer Sister Wendy Beckett (1930–2018) who became somewhat of a media sensation in the 1990s with her television documentaries Sister Wendy's Odyssey (1992), Sister Wendy's Grand Tour (1997), Sister Wendy's Story of Painting (1997), Sister Wendy's American Collection (2001), and Sister Wendy at the Norton Simon Museum (2001).

== Productions ==
As of 2018, there have been two professional stage productions of Postcards from God – The Sister Wendy Musical, with the show's first amateur production in November 2018 at South London Theatre.

=== Jermyn Street Theatre production (2007) ===
The show's premiere took place at London's Jermyn Street Theatre in January 2007. The cast consisted of Juliet Gough, Louise Hollamby, Andrea Miller and Catherine Millsom each playing a number of characters, with Myra Sands in the title role.

The show was directed and choreographed by Omar F. Okai, with arrangements and musical direction by Tyrone Landau. The Okai Collier Company produced, in association with Mr. Theatre Ltd.

The script in this production was a collaboration between the show's creator Marcus Reeves and dramaturg Beccy Smith.

=== Hackney Empire Studio production (2008) ===
In April of the following year, Okai Collier and Mr. Theatre presented a revised version of the show with a new book written by Marcus Reeves.

Gay Soper took on the role of Sister Wendy Beckett, joined by an ensemble consisting of: Sophie Adams, Nicola Blackman, Hannah Everitt, Laura Sheppard, Colette Kelly, Gemma Maclean, Chris Polick, Louise Hollamby and Catherine Millsom (returning from the Jermyn Street production) alongside Marcus Reeves.

Direction and choreography were once again by Omar F. Okai, with musical direction from Tyrone Landau.

In a bid to rebrand the piece, the show was simply known as 'The Sister Wendy Musical'.

=== South London Theatre production (2018) ===
The show was revived for an amateur production at South London Theatre directed by Bryon Fear with revised script by Marcus Reeves and new arrangements by Michael Roulston.

== Critical reception ==
Marcus Reeves gave an interview with LGBT arts site Qulturelink in September 2008 and commented on the piece:

The first outing of Postcards was pretty unformed – it's been a very troubled birth for this little show, with two pretty disastrous productions so far – unfortunately the show risked being turned into more of a chamber pot musical than a chamber musical at times. Our press night at Jermyn Street was an unprecedented event for the venue – with all the well known critics (bar DeJongh) coming out to play – you could virtually hear their silent cackles of glee as the production creaked away in front of them. The later production at the glorified broom cupboard that is Hackney Empire Studio had a new Sister Wendy and a little more bite. In that version and even more so in the newest (so far unseen) draft of the show, the character is certainly far more rounded – however, my aim with the piece has always been to let the audience decide what to make of this woman rather than bash them over the head with a judgment of her, so is she a selfless woman led astray, or an egotist who digs her own ditch and then falls in head first?

In an interview for the South London Theatre website to coincide with their production in 2018, he spoke further:

As the old luvvie adage goes, 'musicals aren't written, they are rewritten' and that's certainly the case with Postcards from God. The revised version of the show for SLT is quite different to what has been put on previously. It helped a great deal to take a break from what was quite a long and intensive period of work on early stage productions and recording a concept cast album. Appropriately, rather like a painter stepping back to look at a portrait, with a bit of time and distance, you can see what works and what doesn't. It also means you can be fairly brutal and cut things that earlier on you were far too attached to, and see what's missing or needs reworking. I hope that audiences will enjoy a funny and moving story, and take away Sister Wendy's message that 'Art is Meant for Everyone'.

== Synopsis ==
=== Act One ===
In a monastery chapel in Norfolk, a group of nuns sing in praise of their neighbour, Sister Wendy Beckett (Second To None). Appearing in her caravan, Sister Wendy introduces herself and the artists she loves (A Passion For Poussin). Sister Anna-Maria, a novice, arrives with the post, including a letter from Daniel, a TV producer, offering Sister Wendy help with a dilemma (Don't Hide Your Light). Sister Wendy reveals that she has been asked by the BBC to present a TV series, but asks Sister Anna-Maria to keep the project a secret from their reverend mother. In Oxford, Daniel leaves his office in charge of his new work experience girl Pammy, while back in Norfolk, Sister Wendy and Sister Anna-Maria go to chapel (Black And White) where Mother Ruth concedes that the series could benefit all the sisters and allows the plans to go ahead on the condition that Sister Wendy takes care of her failing health. The next day, perplexed by the intricacies of art history, Pammy and Sister Anna-Maria ask Daniel and Sister Wendy to explain (Art Is Meant For Everyone). Daniel receives word that the filming can go ahead and Sister Wendy starts her odyssey around Britain by bringing a biblical tale to life (Salome and St. John). Despite the excitement of making the series, she returns to her life of seclusion, receiving a rare visit from her elderly and ailing cousin. The pair reminisce on their childhood, (Closer Than Sisters), before Daniel invites Sister Wendy to make another series, this time touring around Europe. In Florence, Sister Wendy comes face to face with a renaissance icon (Botticelli's Birth Of Venus). Daniel treats her to a trip to Paris to celebrate the end of her tour. On a visit to a café, the pair are besieged by tourists and fans, determined to praise their favourite art nun superstar (Viva Sister Wendy!) upon the news that the BBC are set to syndicate Sister Wendy's programmes across the world.

=== Act Two ===
Some months have passed when Sister Wendy attends the launch for her new book at Dulwich Picture Gallery and is harangued by the press (A Minor Celebrity). Sister Wendy is surprised by the arrival of her sister, Penelope, who has travelled from South Africa to see her. They share an awkward reunion with Penelope reflecting on the differences between them (Faded Dreams) and look at a painting together (Art of Darkness) before they part for the last time. Daniel gives Pammy a pair of pearl earrings and thanks her for inspiring his next and most ambitious venture to date, a trip to the US, while Sister Wendy returns to obscurity once again, troubled by the news that her cousin is critically ill. Although she previously resolved not to make any more TV shows, she soon arrives in America and is met at the airport by her worst nightmare, a group of evangelical singing nuns (Simple Love). Daniel eventually rescues her and she starts filming, with a reflection on the perils of fame inspired by Andy Warhol and his Marilyns (The Campbell's Can Soup-er Man). Later that week, Sister Wendy is a special guest of chat show hostess Sugar Hill (Catch A Star!), who finds she may have met her match after a war of words between the two women. Exhausted and longing to return to her solitary life, Sister Wendy prays (Porcelain) as she prepares to talk about Edward Hopper's 'icon of loneliness' (Nighthawks). Some time later, Daniel is in his office, packing. Pammy arrives and he explains that the USA trip was brought to a premature end by Sister Wendy being taken gravely ill. Pammy confronts Daniel and leaves. Daniel calls Mother Ruth, who tells him that their previous arrangement has come to an end and they both consider their part in Sister Wendy's rise and fall (Black And White – Reprise). Pammy starts work as a tour guide at the Dulwich Picture Gallery, convincing the public that anyone can understand art, if only they learn to look (Art Is Meant For Everyone – Reprise). Back in the caravan, Sister Wendy wakes for the first time in weeks. Sister Anna-Maria leaves her bedside as she looks back on her travels one last time and bids the outside world farewell (Lit Up By The Wonder).

== Concept cast recording ==
2010 saw the recording and online release of eighteen songs from the show, featuring a wealth of West End performers and new arrangements by Michael Roulston (Elegies for Punks and Raging Queens, Saucy Jack and the Space Vixens, Gutenberg! The Musical!) produced by Simon Wallace (Lindsay Kemp, Absolutely Fabulous, French and Saunders).

The concept cast includes:

- Gay Soper (Godspell, Les Misérables, Sunday in the Park with George)
- Nigel Richards (The Phantom of the Opera, Floyd Collins, Tom Waits's The Black Rider)
- Valda Aviks (The Phantom of the Opera, Mary Poppins, Jerry Springer – The Opera)
- Judith Paris (Annie, Oliver!, My Fair Lady)
- Olivier Award winner Leanne Jones (Hairspray, Tick, Tick... Boom!, The Naked Truth)
- Nathan Taylor (Hedwig and the Angry Inch, Taboo, The Rocky Horror Show)
- Juliet Gough (Flashdance, Miss Saigon, Matilda the Musical)
- Alice Redmond (Cats, Monkey: Journey to the West, Tracy Beaker Gets Real)

== Musical numbers ==
- Act One
  - Second To None – Ensemble
  - A Passion For Poussin – Sister Wendy
  - Don't Hide Your Light – Daniel
  - Black And White – Mother Ruth
  - Art Is Meant For Everyone – Sister Wendy, Sister Anna-Maria, Daniel, Pammy
  - Salome And St. John – Sister Wendy, Salome, St. John
  - Closer Than Sisters – Young Wendy, Young Cuz, Sister Wendy, Cuz
  - Botticelli's Birth Of Venus – Sister Wendy, Venus, Flora, Chloris, Zephyr
  - Viva Sister Wendy! – Daniel, Ensemble
- Act Two
  - A Minor Celebrity – Sister Wendy, Reporters
  - Faded Dreams – Penelope
  - Art of Darkness – Sister Wendy, Penelope
  - Simple Love – The Singing Sisters
  - Catch A Star! – Sugar Hill
  - The Campbell's Can Soup-er Man – Sister Wendy, Andy Warhol, Marilyns
  - Porcelain – Sister Wendy
  - Nighthawks – Sister Wendy, Nighthawk Man, Nighthawk Woman
  - Black And White (Reprise) – Daniel, Mother Ruth
  - Art Is Meant For Everyone (Reprise) – Pammy
  - Lit Up By The Wonder – Sister Wendy, Ensemble

== Characters ==
Listed in the order in which they appear.

- Act One
  - Sister Anna-Maria, A novice in Mother Ruth's order who is devoted to Sister Wendy and acts as her personal assistant.
  - Sister Wendy Beckett, Art historian and hermetic nun, living under the protection of Mother Ruth and her order.
  - Daniel, Independent TV Producer and head of Inspiring Films, Oxford.
  - Pammy, a secretary on work experience.
  - Mother Ruth, Reverend Mother of a convent in rural Norfolk.
  - Salome, The daughter of Herodias, featured in a painting by Guercino.
  - St. John, Saint John the Baptist, featured in a painting by Guercino.
  - Cuz, Sister Wendy's cousin, also a nun (Sister Catherine).
  - Young Wendy, Sister Wendy as a child.
  - Young Cuz, Cuz as a child.
  - Flora, Goddess of flowers and spring, featured in Botticelli's painting of the birth of Venus.
  - Zephyr, God of the West wind, featured in Botticelli's painting of the birth of Venus.
  - Venus, Goddess of beauty, featured emerging from the sea in Botticelli's painting.
  - Chloris, Zephyr's wife, featured in Botticelli's painting of the birth of Venus.
  - A French waitress
  - A street artist
  - Sheri, a brash American tourist.
- Act Two
  - Reporters
  - Penelope, Sister Wendy's sister from South Africa
  - Clive Anderson, A BBC Radio presenter.
  - The Singing Sisters of St. Michael, Maryland, A travelling group of singing nuns.
  - Marilyns Several incarnations of Marilyn Monroe, as painted by Andy Warhol.
  - Andy Warhol, pop artist.
  - Floor Manager, part of Sugar Hill's TV crew.
  - Sugar Hill, presenter of 'Catch A Star!' a daily US celebrity gossip show.
  - Nighthawk Woman, featured in Edward Hopper's painting.
  - Nighthawk Man, featured in Edward Hopper's painting.
  - Tour guide, a tour guide working at the Dulwich Picture Gallery.
  - Woman, a visitor to Dulwich Picture Gallery.
  - Man, a visitor to Dulwich Picture Gallery.
