= Life Class =

2007 novel by Pat Barker

- First edition
- Author: Pat Barker
- Language: English
- Publisher: Hamish Hamilton
- Publication date: 5 Jul 2007
- Publication place: United Kingdom
- Pages: 248
- ISBN: 0-241-14297-0
- Preceded by: Double Vision
- Followed by: Toby's Room

Life Class is a novel by Pat Barker released in 2007. The novel is about students at the Slade School of Art in the first years of the twentieth century, one of whom volunteers to serve in a front line hospital during the First World War.

David Boyd Haycock's A Crisis of Brilliance: Five Young British Artists and the Great War (Old Street Publishing, 2009) presents the remarkable "true story" that lies behind Barker's novel.
