= The Man Who Wasn't There (Barker novel) =

1989 novel by Pat Barker

- First edition
- Author: Pat Barker
- Language: English
- Publisher: Virago Press
- Publication date: 2 March 1989
- Publication place: United Kingdom
- Media type: Print
- Pages: 288
- ISBN: 0-86068-891-7
- Preceded by: The Century's Daughter
- Followed by: Regeneration

The Man Who Wasn't There is a novel by Pat Barker, published in 1989. It is the story of a 1950s latch-key kid and his search for a father.
