= Heptonstall =

Village and civil parish in West Yorkshire, England

Coordinates: 53.75309°N 2.03716°W

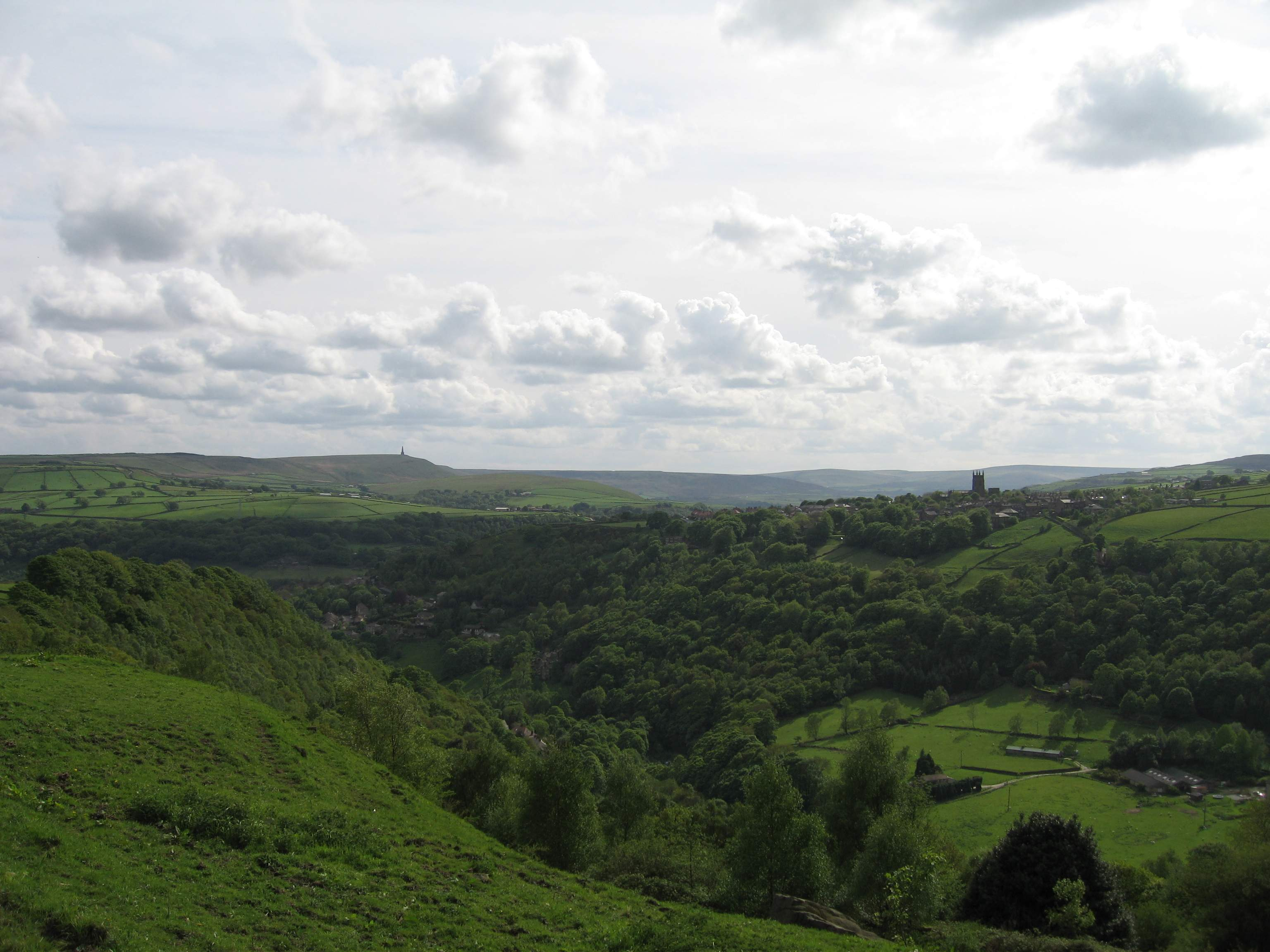
- View of Heptonstall across the Hebden Valley

- Location within West Yorkshire
- Population: 1,470 (2011 census)
- OS grid reference: SD988279
  - London: 175 mi (282 km) SE
- Civil parish: Heptonstall
- Metropolitan borough: Calderdale
- Metropolitan county: West Yorkshire
- Region: Yorkshire and the Humber
- Country: England
- Sovereign state: United Kingdom
- Post town: HEBDEN BRIDGE
- Postcode district: HX7
- Dialling code: 01422
- Police: West Yorkshire
- Fire: West Yorkshire
- Ambulance: Yorkshire
- UK Parliament: Calder Valley

Heptonstall is a small village and civil parish within the Calderdale borough of West Yorkshire, England, historically part of the West Riding of Yorkshire. The population of Heptonstall, including the hamlets of Colden and Slack, was 1,448 at the Census of 2001, increasing to 1,470 by the 2011 Census. At the 2021 Census the parish population was 1,347. The town of Hebden Bridge lies directly to the south-east. Although Heptonstall is part of Hebden Bridge as a post town, it is not within the Hebden Royd town boundaries.

The village is on the route of the Calderdale Way, a 50-mile (80 km) circular walk around the hills and valleys of Calderdale.

== History ==
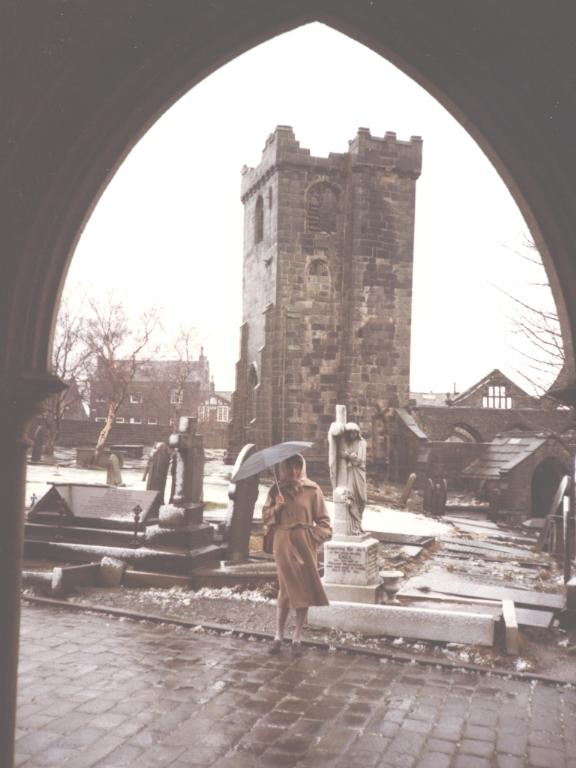
Heptonstall old church from the porch of the new church, 1984

The place-name 'Heptonstall' is first recorded as Heptonstall in the 1274 Wakefield Court Rolls, and in 1316 in the Feudal Aids. The name means "the stall or stable in Hebden". The name 'Hebden' means "rose-hip dene or valley".

Heptonstall initially formed part of the manor of Halifax-cum-Heptonstall, itself subinfeudatory to the manor of Wakefield, and so does not explicitly appear in early taxation records, such as those for the 1379 Poll Tax. In 1626 the manor was spun-off and sold and was extinguished in the late 19th century.

Heptonstall was the site of a battle during the early part of the English Civil War in 1643.

Historically a centre for hand-loom weaving, Heptonstall's cottages and terraced houses are characterised by large first-floor windows to maximise the light for weaving.

The older churchyard claims "King" David Hartley amongst notable graves there. Hartley was founder of the Cragg Coiners and lived as a rogue in the Calderdale area until he was hanged at Knavesmire (Tyburn) near York in 1770.

The foundation stone of its octagonal Methodist chapel, the oldest still in continued use, was laid following the visit of John Wesley in 1764.

In the mid-1980s the paving on a road through Heptonstall was removed, revealing the original stone setts. Although there was a plan to remove the setts, local protests convinced the council to restore them. At the same time the existing concrete street lights were replaced with late 19th-century cast-iron gas-style electric lamps. Both developments acted as a traffic calming measure.

== Community ==
A small local-history museum is based in what was once the village grammar school.

A local park is used for sport and includes a playground for children. Adjacent to Heptonstall lie the National Trust woodlands of Hardcastle Crags with walking paths and a restored 19th-century mill. Half a mile out of the village is Lumb Bank, the second of the Arvon Foundation's residential centres for writers.

Each year on Good Friday there are performances of the Heptonstall version of the traditional Pace Egg play. These are held in Weavers' Square next to the old graveyard. Heptonstall Festival, a free, day-long music festival, is usually held in early July also in Weaver's Square. It usually begins with a fell race.

The village is a day-trip destination for tourists and walkers, especially in the summer months. The two public houses are the Cross and the White Lion. There is a small post office – the original post office, on Smithwell Lane, is now a residential property. A cafe/delicatessen is situated in Towngate.

The village's oldest house is Stag Cottage (c.1580), which is within a small courtyard called Stag Fold. At the back of the cottage, on the level of a public car park, is a doorway to a dungeon, once used as a lock-up. Nearby there is a pinfold, built to hold livestock, but now a picnic area.

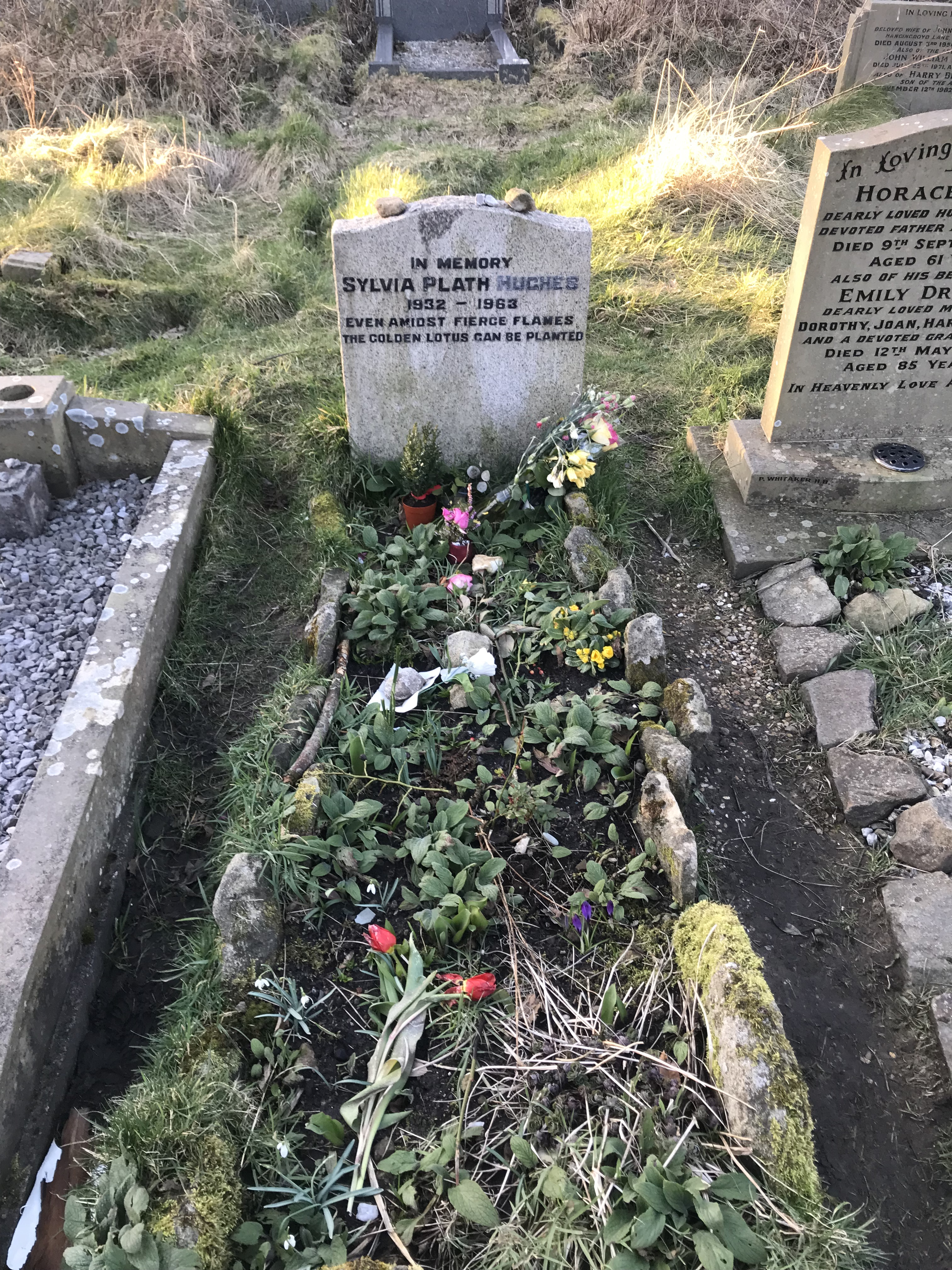
Sylvia Plath's grave, Heptonstall

=== Parish church ===
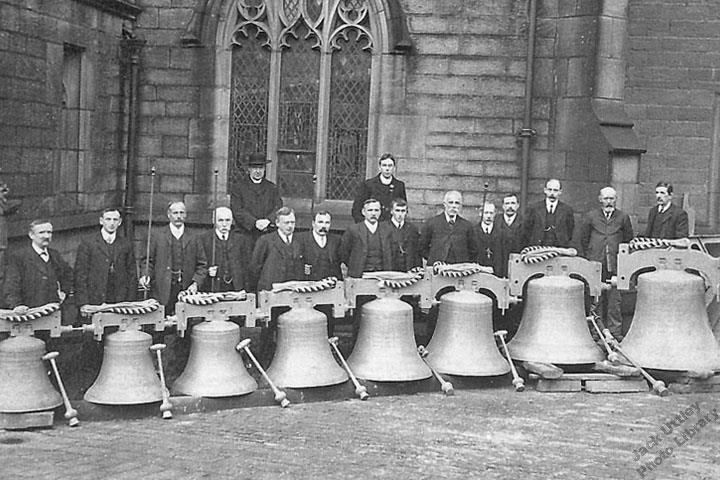
New tower bells before being installed in the tower in 1912

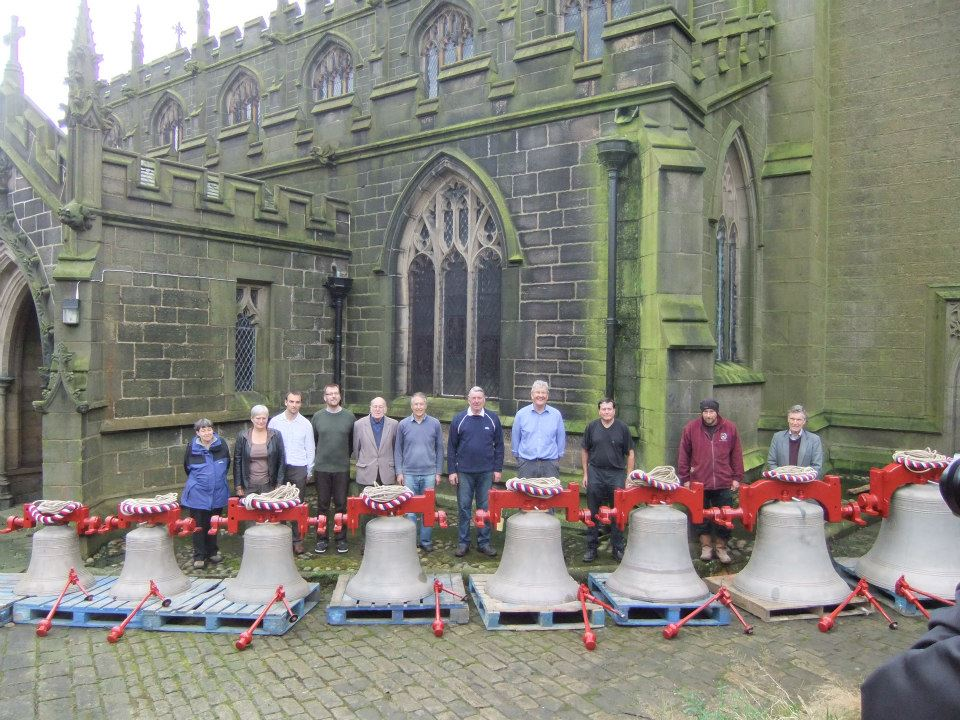
Heptonstall bells on their return with new bearings to the tower in 2012

Heptonstall's original church was dedicated to St Thomas Becket. It was founded c.1260, and was altered and added to over several centuries. The church was damaged by a gale in 1847, and is now only a shell. A new church, St Thomas the Apostle, was built in the same churchyard. This suffered a lightning strike in 1875.

The church is used for the annual Pennine Spring Music Festival, held every Spring Bank Holiday week. This includes workshops, masterclasses and performances. The old church ruin is occasionally used for open-air services.

The tower of the new church contains eight bells, cast in 1912 by John Taylor & Co. These were removed to a bell foundry for refurbishment on 31 August 2012 and were returned, with new bearings, in October 2012.

The American poet Sylvia Plath, who was married to Poet Laureate Ted Hughes from nearby Mytholmroyd, is buried in the graveyard extension, to the south-west of St Thomas Becket's churchyard. Plath's headstone has been several times vandalised by removing Hughes's surname from the memorial.

Another poet buried here is the American expatriate Asa Benveniste, a co-founder in London of the publisher Trigram Press. In the 1980s Benveniste and his partner Agnetha Falk ran a second-hand bookshop in Hebden Bridge. His gravestone reads: "Foolish Enough to Have Been a Poet".

=== Methodist chapel ===
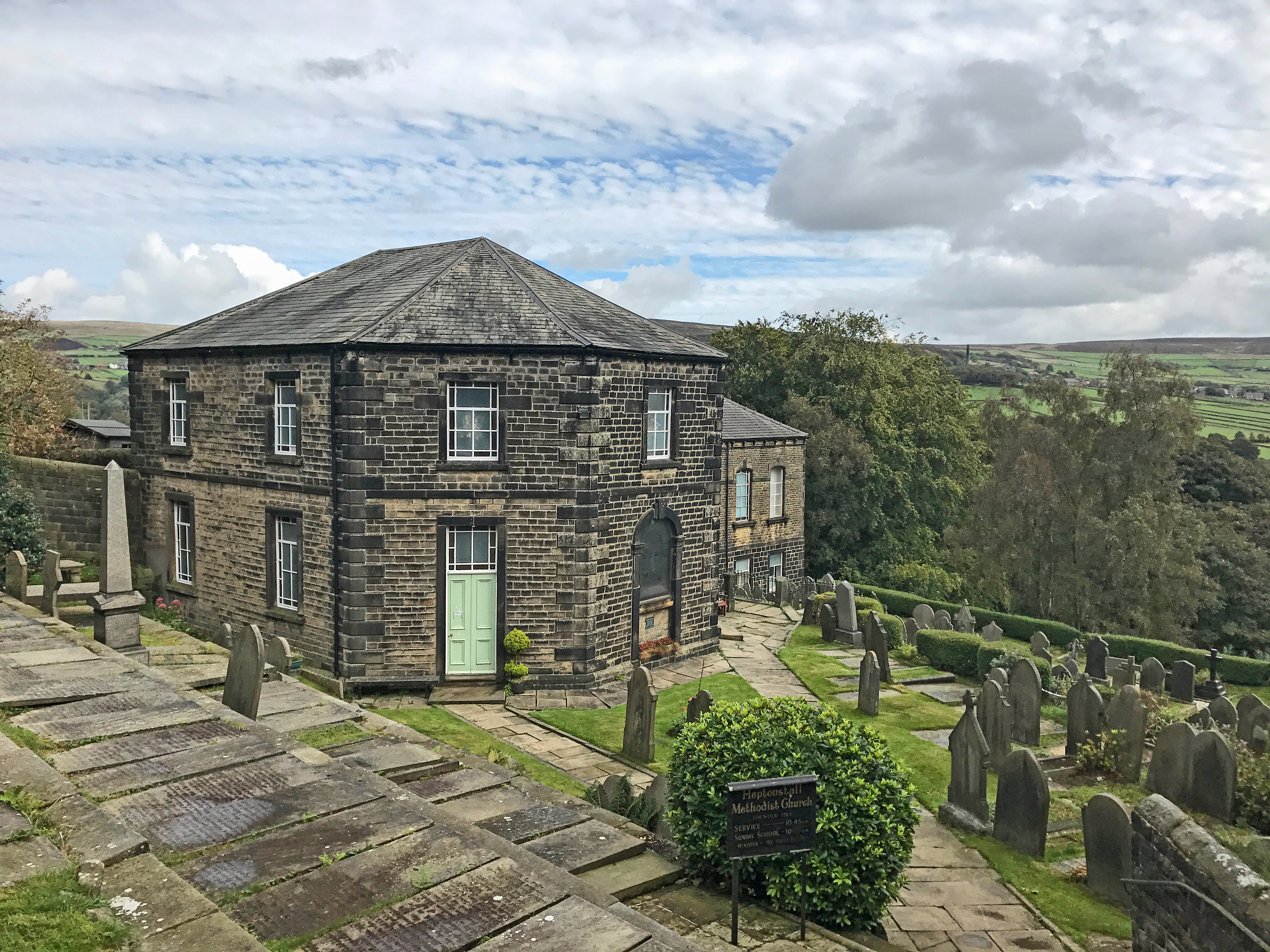
The Methodist chapel and graveyard

John Wesley laid the foundation stone of the octagonal chapel situated off Northgate, which was completed in 1764 – he recommended the shape to avoid conflict with the established church. Local people attended the parish church and Methodist preaching. The chapel also provided teaching in reading and writing for the poor. The chapel was originally built as a symmetrical octagon but by 1802, with the Society including 337 members and 1,002 scholars, one end of the chapel was pulled down and the side walls were extended to provide extra space.

== Media ==
Heptonstall Methodist Chapel featured in the BBC Four 2010 series Churches: How to Read Them, in which Richard Taylor named it as one of his ten favourite churches, saying: "If buildings have an aura, this one radiated friendship."

The ruin of St Thomas a Becket church featured as a location in the 1993 BBC Television drama series Mr. Wroe's Virgins directed by Danny Boyle.

The village was the main location used in the BBC Three situation comedy The Gemma Factor, with the local tearoom being used for a major part of the show. It was aired in spring 2010.

Heptonstall was a major location in The Rochdale Pioneers, a film produced by the Co-operative British Youth Film Academy, telling the story of the birth of the Co-operative movement, and screened in November 2012.

Heptonstall is also featured in the 2010 short film Trailing Dirt, directed by Richard Cousins and written by Alison Flack.

The 2014 BBC drama Happy Valley was partly filmed in Heptonstall, and featured Sylvia Plath's grave.

The BBC drama The Gallows Pole was partly filmed in Heptonstall, an adaptation of a book by Benjamin Myers. It told the story of the Cragg Vale Coiners, who clipped coins. This involved clipping the edges off coins and melting them down to make new coins out of the scraps. It happened on such a large scale, it threatened to devalue the currency. The grave of "King" David Hartley can be seen in the churchyard of St Thomas' Church, Heptonstall.

== See also ==
- Eastwood, West Yorkshire
