= The Silence of the Girls =

2018 novel by Pat Barker

- First edition (UK)
- Author: Pat Barker
- Language: English
- Genre: Greek mythology
- Publisher: Hamish Hamilton (UK); Doubleday Books (US)
- Publication date: 4 September 2018
- Publication place: United Kingdom
- Media type: Print (hardback & paperback)
- Pages: 293
- ISBN: 0385544219
- Followed by: The Women of Troy

The Silence of the Girls is a 2018 novel by English novelist Pat Barker. It recounts the events of the Iliad chiefly from the point of view of Briseis.

== Plot summary ==
The plot begins when Greeks led by Achilles sack Lyrnessus, describing the looting and burning of the city, the massacre of its men and the abduction of its women including Briseis, the childless wife of king Mynes. When the women are handed out to the leaders of the Greek raiders, Briseis, as beautiful and of royal blood, is given to Achilles.

The plot then becomes that of the Iliad, covering the dispute between Achilles and Agamemnon over Chryseis, which results in Achilles yielding Briseis to Agamemnon, Achilles's subsequent refusal to join the fighting, then the deaths of Patroclus, Hector, and finally Achilles. Briseis has become pregnant with Achilles's child shortly before his death, of which Achilles has foreknowledge; he marries her to one of his lieutenants, and the story ends as the Greek warriors depart the Trojan shores to return to their homes, accompanied by Briseis and the female war captives.

The story is told chiefly by Briseis in the first person, with interjections giving Achilles's internal state of mind. However, as the title suggests, Briseis's narrative is almost entirely internal; except in flashbacks to times before her capture, she speaks out loud hardly at all and with only a few handfuls of words.

Parts of the closing sequence, describing the fate of Troy's women and the sacrifice of Priam's daughter at Achilles's burial mound, are taken from The Trojan Women by Euripides.

The novel features appearances by many characters from the Iliad including Priam, Nestor, Ajax the Great, Agamemnon, and Helen of Troy. It portrays with great intensity the brutality and filth of the war, and the emotional state of Achilles and Patroclus. Achilles's mother, the Nereid Thetis, appears but only speaks to Achilles when he grieves for Patroclus; she asks what's wrong and says she will bring him armour.

== Critical reception ==
The Silence of the Girls was generally well received. The Guardian called it "an important, powerful, memorable book" while The Independent described it as an "impressive feat". Anna Carey in The Irish Times described it as "angry, thoughtful, sad, deeply humane and compulsively readable".

Reviewers universally noted the novel's intense, often coarsely raw, portrayal of women's experience of war and its complete lack of glamorisation or praise of anything military. The following passage was excerpted by multiple reviewers: No longer an issue of decorum, now it's about staying alive. "I do what no man before me has ever done, I kiss the hands of the man who killed my son," declares Priam when he prostrates himself before Achilles begging for Hector's body. “And I do what countless women before me have been forced to do," Briseis thinks bitterly, "I spread my legs for the man who killed my husband and my brothers."

Some reviewers (Gilbert in The Atlantic, Wilson in The Guardian) commented with disfavor on Barker's use of contemporary idioms, arguing that it was jarringly out of sync with the novel's Trojan-war backdrop. Several noted the parallel with Circe by Madeline Miller, also from 2018 and also accomplished by turning a minor figure from Homeric myth into the protagonist of a novel.
