= David Barker (zoologist) =

British zoologist and neurologist

- Born: 18 February 1922
- Died: 7 January 2009 (aged 86)
- Scientific career
- Fields: Zoology, Neurology, Neuroanatomy

David Barker (18 February 1922 – 7 January 2009) was a British zoologist and neurologist specialising in animal neuroanatomy. He was professor emeritus of zoology at the University of Durham and is honoured by the annual award of the David Barker Prize in Zoology. In February 1963, he published Zoology and Medical Research.

Barker studied anatomy at the University of Oxford's constituent Magdalen College from 1941 to 1943 under the tutelage of John Zachary Young. During his time here, he achieved notable academic success, including being awarded a Jenner Exhibition and graduating with first-class honors in Zoology in 1943. He continued his research endeavors as a Senior Demyship at Magdalen College, and later received a Leverhulme Research Scholarship at the Royal College of Surgeons. In 1948, he completed his Doctor of Philosophy with a thesis titled "The Recovery of Proprioceptor Function after Nerve-injury," which earned him the Rolleston Memorial Prize.

In 1950, Barker assumed the position of Chair of Zoology at the University of Hong Kong. As the head of the Department of Biology (which subsequently split into two departments), he shouldered various responsibilities, including organizing a range of courses from basic to advanced levels in zoology, as well as engaging in extra-curricular work. Notably, he established a Fisheries Research Unit, which boasted its own laboratory and research vessel.

Barker's research interests primarily revolved around proprioception, and his contributions in this field were widely recognized. In commemoration of the golden jubilee of the University of Hong Kong, he organized an international seminar focused on muscle receptors. He also demonstrated his passion for fieldwork by leading expeditions to North Borneo and Tunisia. The Tunisian expedition aimed to study the unique hot-spring crustacean known as Thermosbaena mirabilis.

Until his death in January 2009, he lived in Durham with his wife, the author Pat Barker. His daughter is the novelist Anna Ralph. His son is also married with children.

== Bibliography ==
- Zoology and Medical Research (University of Durham, 1963) ISBN 0-900926-41-4
