= The Last Coiner =

Graphic novel

The Last Coiner (#1) (November 2006)

The Last Coiner is a graphic novel, written by RTS Award-winning filmmaker Peter M. Kershaw, with comicbook artist Vince Danks whose credits include the Torchwood Official Magazine, the independently published Harker and Critchley from Ariel Press, and Fleetway Editions Ltd. Red Dwarf Smegazine.

The book tells the story of the 18th Century Cragg Vale Coiners. The counterfeiter "King" David Hartley appears here as David Hawkswort (Keith Patrick). Mark Wilson Smith also appears. Actors performed against blue screen, which formed a basis for the digitized artwork.

Keith Patrick on the set of The Last Coiner

Duchy Parade Films released a graphic novel featuring digitized actors, a docudrama first seen at the Hebden Bridge Picture House, andCoins & Nooses, an online game.

Peter M. Kershaw (2006), The Last Coiner (The last Coiner ed.), Yorkshire, England: Duchy Parade Films, OL 24228295M
