= Toby's Room =

Novel by Pat Barker

- First edition (publ. Hamish Hamilton)
- Author: Pat Barker
- Language: English
- Publication date: 2012

Toby's Room (2012) is English novelist Pat Barker's follow up novel to Life Class (2007). It continues to follow the fortunes of a group of students and teachers of the Slade School of Fine Art during the First World War.

== Plot summary ==
The novel falls into two distinct parts covering two time periods – 1912 and 1917

=== 1912 ===
Elinor Brooke, student at Slade, is home for the weekend from her studies in London, along with her older siblings Rachel and Toby. She and Toby go walking out to the old Mill, something that they did, although forbidden, as children. While exploring the Mill, Toby and Elinor fall into a playful embrace, which becomes, at least on Toby's part, a passionate kiss, which he immediately regrets.

Although disgusted by his behavior, Elinor agrees to pretend that nothing has happened to the rest of the family. Nevertheless, she is distressed by what has happened, and goes to Toby's room that night to confront him. He wakes and pulls her into bed with him.

The next day Elinor's mother, while alone with her, tells her that Toby had a papyrus twin, a girl that died in the womb early, and whose corpse was slowly crushed by Toby's growing body.

Elinor returns to London, still disgusted with Toby and herself. She is distracted in her studies, which is noted by Tonks, her intimidating teacher at Slade. She begins an anatomy class at the teaching hospital to improve her skills. She is not repelled by this, but the situation is still awkward as Toby, a medical student, was going to tutor her in anatomy, but now a distance has grown between them.

This rift is solved by Toby's becoming very ill and ignoring his health while studying for his finals. Elinor nurses him, they both keep the incident from their family, and they mend their relationship somewhat.

=== 1917 ===
In the midst of the First World War, Elinor has returned to the family home. She has the feeling that Toby, a medical officer at the front in France, will not return home. Several weeks later they find out he is "Missing, believed killed." In denial about the War itself, and without a body located, Elinor cannot believe that the story she has been told is what actually happened.

Finding out that another former Slade student, Kit Neville, served under her brother, she writes to him to find out what happened, but he doesn't reply, which makes her think that there is something more to the story of her brother's death. She seeks the help of her former Slade lover Paul Tarrant, wounded in battle, and best friend Catherine, to find out what really happened to Toby, no matter what the truth is.

They find Neville at The Queen's Hospital, Sidcup, a hospital that exclusively treats facial wounds, and it is also where Tonks is working, using his skills as an artist to depict the wounds, and recovery through surgery pioneered by Harold Gillies, of the injured soldiers hospitalised there.

Neville is reluctant to tell Toby's story, and in the meantime Elinor agrees to join Tonks in helping to draw the patients there. Kit struggles through his surgery and recovery, slowly revealing to the reader, and finally to Paul, that Toby's cavalier attitude towards putting his men in danger by taking massive risks took his toll on Neville, and when he caught Toby having sex with a stable boy he reported him. His superior officer gave Toby a choice between court martial and 'doing the right thing', i.e. killing himself in No Man's Land and being labelled a hero.

Paul reluctantly tells Elinor about how her brother died, and is surprised that it brings her some peace. The Brookes sell the family home, further fragmenting them after Toby's death, and Elinor looks to her future as an artist.

== Characters ==
- Elinor Brooke - A painter, graduate of Slade, major character in Life Class
- Paul Tarrant - A painter from the North, major character in Life Class
- Kit Neville - A painter, also a peer of Elinor and Paul's from Slade. He is a highly disagreeable and arrogant figure. He was a stretcher-bearer for Toby Brooke before being wounded and horrifically disfigured in the face.
- Henry 'Harry' Tonks - Fine Arts professor at Slade, a real-life figure, partially fictionalised for the novel.
- Toby Brooke - Elinor's brother
- Catherine - Elinor's best friend at Slade. She has German ancestry and has been persecuted during the War as a result.
- Harold Gillies - Medical officer and surgeon at The Queen's Hospital. A real-life figure who is considered to be the father of plastic surgery
- Rachel Brooke - Elinor and Toby's older sister
- Mr and Mrs Brooke - Elinor, Toby and Rachel's parents. They are estranged, but will not admit it in polite society. Mrs Brooke has a strained relationship with Elinor because of her non-conformity.

== Critical reception ==
Lee of The Guardian says: "Barker makes us see, with steadiness and without sensationalism, the men with no eyes, the men with no mouths, the men with no jaws, men whose tongues stick out through holes in their cheeks, men who are being patched up and operated on "and sent on their way with whatever the surgeons had managed to supply by way of a face". Lee also notes Barker's frequent return to T.S. Eliot's The Waste Land as a touchstone for the First World War. ("the wound and the wasteland are the same thing. They aren't metaphors for each other, it's closer than that.")

The Telegraph stated that the prose style "remains fresh, humanely business-like, crisp and unsentimental. Images are scrupulously vivid, and the plot has real momentum." In the Times Literary Supplement, Mark Bostridge pointed out that the novel as whole owes much to the work of Vera Brittain, and that the fate of Toby Brooke, who killed himself rather than face a court-martial for homosexuality, is clearly based on what has been uncovered by Bostridge about the death of Vera Brittain's brother Edward Brittain, though Barker's novel does not acknowledge the source of the story.
