= Stanley & Iris =

1990 film by Martin Ritt

- Theatrical release poster
- Directed by: Martin Ritt
- Screenplay by: Harriet Frank, Jr.; Irving Ravetch
- Based on: Union Street by Pat Barker
- Produced by: Arlene Sellers; Alex Winitsky
- Starring: Jane Fonda; Robert De Niro
- Cinematography: Donald McAlpine
- Edited by: Sidney Levin
- Music by: John Williams
- Production companies: Lantana Productions; Star Partners II Ltd. Metro-Goldwyn-Mayer
- Distributed by: MGM/UA Communications Co.
- Release date: February 9, 1990
- Running time: 104 minutes
- Country: United States
- Language: English
- Budget: $23 million
- Box office: $5.8 million

Stanley & Iris is a 1990 American romantic drama film directed by Martin Ritt and starring Jane Fonda and Robert De Niro. The screenplay by Harriet Frank Jr. and Irving Ravetch is loosely based on the 1982 novel Union Street by Pat Barker.

The original music score is composed by John Williams, and the cinematography is by Donald McAlpine. The film was marketed with the tagline "Some people need love spelled out for them". It is the final film for the Ritt, Frank and Ravetch trio, as Ritt died ten months after the film's release, while Ravetch and Frank retired after the film's release. It is also the last film in which Fonda would appear for 15 years until 2005's Monster-in-Law.

The film was panned by critics and was a box-office bomb.

== Plot ==
Iris King, a widow who is still grieving eight months after losing her husband, lives in a high-crime area in Connecticut and works in a baked-goods factory. She lives from paycheck to paycheck as she raises her two children Kelly and Richard. With money already tight for the family, Kelly learns that she is pregnant, making matters worse.

Iris makes the acquaintance of Stanley Cox, a cook in the bakery's canteen, when he comes to her aid after her purse is snatched while a passenger on a public-transit bus. But as their friendship develops, she notices peculiarities about Stanley. Witnessing his inability to recognize a specific medication, Iris realizes that Stanley is illiterate. When she innocently mentions this to Stanley's boss, Stanley is fired the next day over food safety and lawsuit concerns.

Unable to find steady work, Stanley moves into a garage as his residence. He is also forced to put his elderly father (who lived with him) into a low-end retirement home, where he dies after only a few weeks. Upset by these events, Stanley asks Iris if she can teach him to read. He explains that his traveling-salesman father moved him between dozens of schools around the country when Stanley was a boy, resulting in his developing no reading nor writing skills from this lack of educational stability. Iris agrees and starts to give him basic reading lessons, and he gradually grows close to her and her family. During one of these reading exercises, Stanley confides in her that he has wanted to be intimate with her since they first met, but Iris is hesitant.

Iris tests Stanley's developing reading skills by making a map for him to use to meet her at a nearby street corner, but Stanley becomes hopelessly lost. He eventually finds her, but he ultimately ignores her and heads home.

Iris visits a discouraged Stanley at his garage residence to try to convince him to resume his lessons. Stanley, who is an inventor as a hobby, is at work on an elaborate cake-cooling machine that he designed that can potentially outperform similar commercial equipment. Iris is impressed by the device, and Stanley says that a nearby company was also impressed and offered him a job. He agrees to start reading with Iris again, and soon learns to write short sentences. The two begin to grow close again.

Stanley and Iris finally decide to consummate their relationship, but Iris is still clinging to her late husband's memory. This threatens their budding relationship. Unwilling to give up on Iris because she never gave up on him, Stanley finally goes to see her. Iris hands him an unmailed letter that she wrote to him, and Stanley surprises her by reading it aloud nearly perfectly. Iris, now ready to start letting go of the past, accompanies Stanley to a fancy hotel, where they order room service and spend the night together.

Stanley soon moves to Detroit for a new, well-paying job that he has been offered based on his inventions. Several months later, in Connecticut, Iris is carrying groceries home when a new car pulls up next to her, with Stanley behind the wheel. Stanley just got a raise and plans to buy a large fixer-upper house in Detroit, and wants the family to come there to live with him, with her as his wife. Iris accepts.

== Main cast ==
- Jane Fonda as Iris King
- Robert De Niro as Stanley Cox
- Swoosie Kurtz as Sharon
- Martha Plimpton as Kelly
- Harley Cross as Richard
- Jamey Sheridan as Joe
- Feodor Chaliapin Jr. as Leonides Cox (credited as Feodor Chaliapin)
- Eddie Jones as Mr. Hagen

== Production ==
The film was shot on location in Toronto, Ontario, and Waterbury, Connecticut. During filming in Waterbury in summer 1988, local Vietnam War veterans picketed the production, protesting Jane Fonda's anti-war activities of a decade-and-a-half earlier. Fonda and De Niro were each paid $3.5 million for their performances; director Ritt received $1.65 million and the Ravetches $500,000.

== Reception ==
=== Critical response ===
The film was panned by critics. On the review aggregator website Rotten Tomatoes, 29% of 17 critics' reviews are positive, with an average rating of 4.4/10.

=== Box office ===
The film was a commercial failure. In the United States and Canada, Stanley & Iris grossed $5.8 million at the box office, against a budget of $23 million.

== Music ==
Stanley & Iris: Original Motion Picture Soundtrack

Film score by John Williams
- Released: 1990 (original); 2017 (expansion)
- Recorded: Lorimar Music Scoring
- Length: 28:56 (original); 59:31 (on the Deluxe Edition)
- Label: Varèse Sarabande
- Producer: John Williams

John Williams chronology
| Indiana Jones and the Last Crusade (1989) | Stanley & Iris: Original Motion Picture Soundtrack (1990) | Home Alone (1990) |

Professional ratings
Review scores
| Source | Rating |
|---|---|
| Filmtracks | 2/5 stars |

=== Track listing ===
The original soundtrack was released with 12 tracks.

| No. | Title | Length |
|---|---|---|
| 1. | "Stanley and Iris" | 3:24 |
| 2. | "Reading Lessons" | 2:26 |
| 3. | "The Bicycle" | 3:07 |
| 4. | "Factory Work" | 1:23 |
| 5. | "Finding a Family" | 1:41 |
| 6. | "Stanley at Work" | 1:31 |
| 7. | "Looking after Papa" | 3:10 |
| 8. | "Stanley's Invention" | 1:17 |
| 9. | "Night Visit" | 1:58 |
| 10. | "Letters" | 3:25 |
| 11. | "Putting it all Together" | 1:46 |
| 12. | "End Credits" | 3:03 |

=== Deluxe Edition track listing ===
In 2017, Varèse Sarabande issued an expanded edition with John Williams's score for Martin Ritt's 1972 film Pete 'n' Tillie (tracks 27-36 - duration 17:51).

| No. | Title | Length |
|---|---|---|
| 1. | "Stanley and Iris" | 3:26 |
| 2. | "The Bicycle" | 3:09 |
| 3. | "The Pink Sweater" | 1:07 |
| 4. | "Iris After Work" | 0:40 |
| 5. | "Stanley at Work" | 1:33 |
| 6. | "Looking after Papa" | 3:05 |
| 7. | "Entering the Library" | 1:07 |
| 8. | "Night Visit" | 2:00 |
| 9. | "Factory Work" | 1:26 |
| 10. | "Naming the Trees" | 3:37 |
| 11. | "Finding a Family" | 1:42 |
| 12. | "Lost in the Streets" | 2:56 |
| 13. | "Stanley's Invention" | 1:18 |
| 14. | "The Kitchen Table" | 1:06 |
| 15. | "Seeing the Baby" | 1:15 |
| 16. | "Reading Lessons" | 2:28 |
| 17. | "Growing Together" | 2:09 |
| 18. | "Putting It All Together" | 1:47 |
| 19. | "Letters" | 3:28 |
| 20. | "End Title" | 3:04 |
| 21. | "Stanley and Iris (Film version)" | 3:24 |
| 22. | "Stanley at Work (Film version)" | 1:29 |
| 23. | "Looking after Papa (Film version)" | 3:11 |
| 24. | "Stanley's Invention (Film version)" | 1:18 |
| 25. | "Putting It All Together (Film version)" | 1:49 |
| 26. | "Letters (Film version)" | 4:00 |
| 27. | "Pete 'n' Tillie - Main Title" | 1:57 |
| 28. | "Afterglow" | 1:46 |
| 29. | "Marriage Book" | 1:48 |
| 30. | "Bedroom Scene" | 0:57 |
| 31. | "Vacation" | 2:45 |
| 32. | "For Robbie" | 1:33 |
| 33. | "Funeral" | 0:52 |
| 34. | "Hospital" | 0:42 |
| 35. | "End Title and End Cast" | 3:49 |
| 36. | "Love Theme" | 2:27 |
