= Lumb Bank =

House in Yorkshire, England

Coordinates: 53.75133°N 2.03307°W

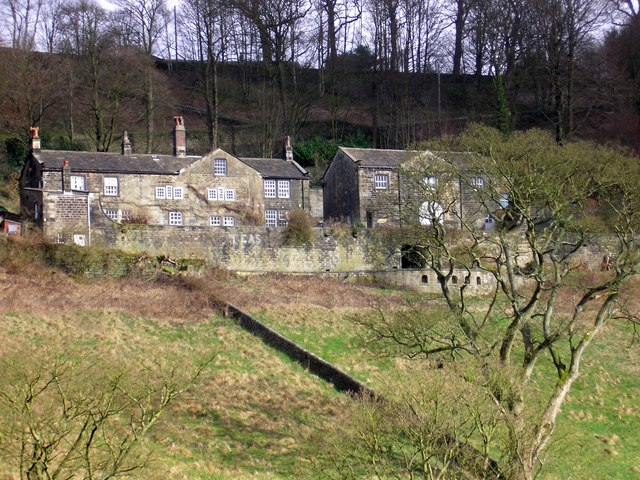
Lumb Bank in 2007

Lumb Bank is a house near Heptonstall in West Yorkshire, England. It was the residence of the poet Ted Hughes. It is now one of the Arvon Writing Houses run by the Arvon Foundation.

Lumb Bank was the original manor house of Heptonstall. It is situated in a secluded valley with the fields in front of the house falling steeply to a stream. It has been described as an 18th-century mill owner's house. It was bought by the poet Ted Hughes in May 1969. He had initially considered buying it in July 1963, a few months after the suicide of his wife Sylvia Plath.

The house was damaged by fire in 1971. Hughes's biographer Jonathan Bate wrote that 'all the signs pointed to arson' due to a hole in the ceiling and a 'heap of charred rubbish'. Much of the bedding had been removed from the house along with 'a curious selection of items'. Two police detectives who attended felt they did not have enough information to investigate. One of the detectives believed the fire was due to personal malice, with the other believing that it might have been caused by local children. Hughes had recently taken his books from the house to Devon, yet piles of manuscripts remained which did not burn due to the dampness in the house. Some of Plath's manuscripts were destroyed in the fire. Lumb Bank was subsequently renovated at a cost of £20,000 in 1975 (equivalent to £155,339 in 2025).

It was leased from Ted and Carol Hughes by the Arvon Foundation in 1975 before being acquired by the foundation in 1989 from The Hughes Trust with assistance from the Arts Council of Great Britain. In September 1988 the foundation was offered £36,500 over three years by the Arts Council of Great Britain. The award was an incentive offered on condition that the foundation raise its income by £73,000. It was the first full award offered by the council under their incentive funding scheme.

Pat Barker attended a workshop at Lumb Bank led by Angela Carter which led to the contract from Virago Press to publish her first book, Union Street, in 1982. Nigel Williamson wrote an article for The Times in 1997 recalling his experiences attending a novel writing workshop led by Barbara Trapido.

The writer Vernon Scannell was a frequent tutor at Lumb Bank and depicted it as "Crackenthorpe Hall" in his 1998 novel Feminine Endings.
