= Blow Your House Down =

1984 novel by Pat Barker

- First hardback edition (publ. Virago Press)
- Author: Pat Barker
- Publication date: 1 January 1984
- ISBN: 978-0-399-13011-3

Blow Your House Down is the second novel by Pat Barker. Published in 1984, the novel follows the lives of a number of prostitutes working in a northern English city at a time when a serial killer of prostitutes is haunting the area. The main focus is on two prostitute characters, Brenda and Jean, and their respective histories.

== Plot summary ==
The novel is divided into four parts. Part 1, which is centred on Brenda, starts off by showing Brenda in the role of a mother of three children; she is shown putting them to sleep before she goes out for the evening. Most of Part 1 sees Brenda (in conjunction with Audrey) walking the street; episodes/encounters with customers are juxtaposed with passages telling Brenda's history of becoming a prostitute. In the final section of part 1 the focus switches to Kath, an 'old', experienced, but ruined prostitute whose three kids were taken into communal care and whose luck has steadily deteriorated since that time. On leaving Palmerston (a pub where the prostitutes have their drinks before starting their work) Kath is approached by a client. He turns out to be the killer. Kath in her highly intoxicated state is unable to proffer any resistance to the man and he kills her.

Part 2 shows the intensifying of the fear among the prostitutes. It also further elaborates on the motherly part of the prostitutes' lives; Elaine is expecting a baby but continues in her job - she starts working in a pair with Jean who seems to have a plan of some sort to trap and find the killer. The focus of the narrative gradually switches to Jean.

Part 3 is the climax of the novel as it leads to Jean's identification and killing of the serial killer. It is narrated by Jean who tells the story of her friendship, teamwork, and romantic relationship with Carol, a young and vulnerable fellow prostitute who one day disappeared under dramatic circumstances. After Carol's corpse has been found on a heap of rubbish the strength of Jean's love for Carol makes her determined to track down the murderer. From the clues given to her by her instinct and the murderer's 'handwriting' she chooses a spot where she thinks she is most likely to meet him. Her waiting finally bears fruit and she manages to stab the man with a knife. Though in the end she herself is left to wonder whether she has killed the real murderer, the reader – from the description of the murderer's encounter with Kath – suspects that she has killed the right person (although this is never made clear). In the final chapter the news is told that Elaine has given birth to a boy.

== Themes and motifs ==
The novel introduces some of Pat Barker's stable motifs and themes, e.g. the different smell of a person's body when they are afraid; the preoccupation with the visual and the enigma of the human eye; the destruction of clichés, s.a. the belief that prostitutes are poor, unintelligent, and do not have other opportunities for work: "I like this life. I'm not in it because I'm a poor, deprived, inadequate, half-witted woman, whatever some people might like to think, I'm in it because it suits me, I like the company, I like the excitement. I like the feeling of stepping out onto the street, not knowing what's going to happen or who I'm going to meet. I like the freedom. I like being able to decide when I'm going to work. I like being able to take the day off without being answerable to anybody." Similarly to Kelly's story in Union Street, Barker's first oeuvre, in Blow Your House Down is the obscure middle-class character (here, a serial killer, there a child rapist), apparently a well-to-do family man, but in reality one who has an unresolved complex stemming from his childhood. There is a telling parallel between them: the rapist from Union Street eats a peppermint chewing gum, the murderer in Blow Your House Down violet-smelling candies, when they are about to commit their crimes - perhaps a way of keeping their egos clean from the dirty business of their ids. Also reminiscent of Barker's debut, there is a community of women who are on honest, friendly, supportive terms mutually. The only males in the novel are the clients. These are sometimes pathetic, sometimes brutal but they rarely manage to arouse a real positive emotion in the prostitutes. The novel can be read as a celebration of the aggressive vitality of the women prostitutes.
