= Pat Barker =

English writer and novelist

Dame Pat Barker DBE FRSL HonFBA
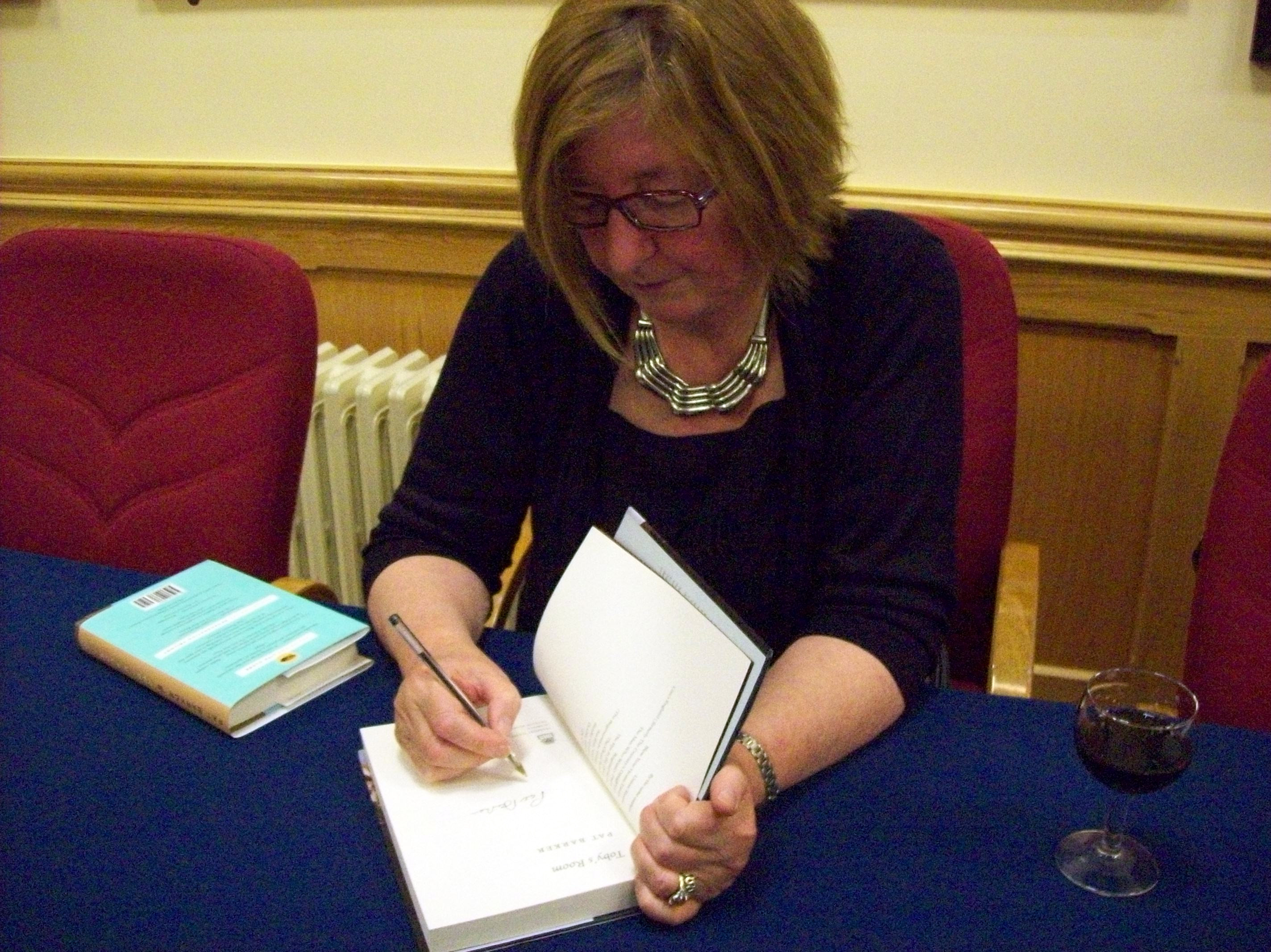
- Pat Barker in October 2012
- Born: Patricia Mary W. Drake; 8 May 1943 (age 83); Thornaby-on-Tees, North Riding of Yorkshire, England
- Education: London School of Economics
- Occupation: Novelist
- Spouse: David Barker
- Children: 2
- Writing career
- Subjects: Memory, trauma, survival, recovery
- Notable work: Regeneration Trilogy
- Notable awards: Booker Prize, Guardian First Book Award

Dame Patricia Mary W. Barker, DBE, FRSL, HonFBA (née Drake; born 8 May 1943) is an English writer and novelist. She has won many awards for her fiction, which centres on themes of memory, trauma, survival and recovery. She is known for her Regeneration Trilogy, published in the 1990s, and, more recently, a series of books set during the Trojan War, starting with The Silence of the Girls in 2018.

== Early life and education ==
Patricia Mary W. Drake was born on 8 May 1943 to a working-class family in Thornaby-on-Tees in the North Riding of Yorkshire, England. Her mother, Moyra Drake, died in 2000; her father's identity is unknown. According to The Times, Moyra became pregnant "after a drunken night out while in the Wrens." In a social climate where illegitimacy was regarded with shame, she told people that the resulting child was her sister rather than her daughter. They lived with Barker's grandmother Alice and step-grandfather William, until her mother married and moved out when Barker was seven. Barker could have joined her mother, she told The Guardian in 2003, but chose to stay with her grandmother "because of love of her, and because my stepfather didn't warm to me, nor me to him." Her grandparents ran a fish and chip shop, which failed, and the family was, she told The Times in 2007, "poor as church mice; we were living on National Assistance – 'on the pancrack', as my grandmother called it."

At the age of eleven Barker won a place at grammar school, attending King James Grammar School in Knaresborough, and Grangefield Grammar School in Stockton-on-Tees.

Barker, who says she has always been an avid reader, studied international history at the London School of Economics from 1962 to 1965. After graduating in 1965, she returned home to nurse her grandmother, who died in 1971. She studied education at Neville's Cross College in Durham from 1965-1966.

== Career ==
=== Early work ===
Barker has written many novels. In her mid-twenties she began to write fiction. Her first three novels were never published and, she told The Guardian in 2003, "didn't deserve to be: I was being a sensitive lady novelist, which is not what I am. There's an earthiness and bawdiness in my voice."

Her first published novel was Union Street (1982), which consisted of seven interlinked stories about English working class women whose lives are circumscribed by poverty and violence. For ten years the manuscript was rejected by publishers as too "bleak and depressing". Barker met novelist Angela Carter at an Arvon Foundation writers' workshop. Carter liked the book, telling Barker "if they can't sympathise with the women you're creating, then sod their fucking luck" and suggested she send the manuscript to feminist publisher Virago, which accepted it. The New Statesman hailed the novel as a "long overdue working class masterpiece," and The New York Times Book Review commented Barker "gives the sense of a writer who has enormous power that she has scarcely had to tap to write a first-rate first novel." Union Street was later adapted as the Hollywood film Stanley & Iris (1990), starring Robert De Niro and Jane Fonda. Barker has said the film bears little resemblance to her book. As of 2003 the novel remained one of Virago's top sellers.

Barker's first three published novels – Union Street (1982), Blow Your House Down (1984) and Liza's England (1986; originally published as The Century's Daughter) – depicted the lives of working-class women in Yorkshire. BookForum magazine described them as "full of feeling, violent and sordid, but never exploitative or sensationalistic and rarely sentimental." Blow Your House Down portrays prostitutes living in a North of England city, who are being stalked by a serial killer. Liza's England, described by The Sunday Times as a "modern-day masterpiece," tracks the life of a working-class woman born at the dawn of the 20th century.

=== Regeneration Trilogy ===
Following the publication of Liza's England, Barker felt she "had got myself into a box where I was strongly typecast as a northern, regional, working class, feminist—label, label, label—novelist. It's not a matter so much of objecting to the labels, but you do get to a point where people are reading the labels instead of the book. And I felt I'd got to that point", she said in 1992. She said she was tired of reviewers asking "'but uh, can she do men?' – as though that were some kind of Everest".

Therefore, she turned her attention to the First World War, which she had always wanted to write about due to her step-grandfather's wartime experiences. Wounded by a bayonet and left with a scar, he would not speak about the war. She was inspired to write what is now known as the Regeneration Trilogy—Regeneration (1991), The Eye in the Door (1993), and The Ghost Road (1995)—a set of novels that explore the history of the First World War by focusing on the aftermath of trauma. The books are an unusual blend of history, with real life characters, and fiction, and Barker draws extensively on the writings of First World War poets and W. H. R. Rivers, an army doctor who worked with traumatised soldiers. The main characters are based on historical figures, such as Robert Graves, Alice and Hettie Roper (pseudonyms for Alice Wheeldon and her daughter Hettie Wheeldon) with the exception of Billy Prior, whom Barker invented to parallel and contrast with British soldier-poets Wilfred Owen and Siegfried Sassoon. As the central fictional character, Billy Prior is in all three books.

“I think the whole British psyche is suffering from the contradiction you see in Sassoon and Wilfred Owen, where the war is both terrible and never to be repeated and at the same time experiences derived from it are given enormous value," Barker told The Guardian. "No one watches war films in quite the way the British do."

Barker told freelance journalist Wera Reusch "I think there is a lot to be said for writing about history, because you can sometimes deal with contemporary dilemmas in a way people are more open to because it is presented in this unfamiliar guise, they don't automatically know what they think about it, whereas if you are writing about a contemporary issue on the nose, sometimes all you do is activate people's prejudices. I think the historical novel can be a backdoor into the present which is very valuable."

The Regeneration Trilogy was extremely well received by critics, with Peter Kemp of the Sunday Times describing it as "brilliant, intense and subtle", and Publishers Weekly saying it was "a triumph of an imagination at once poetic and practical." The trilogy is described by The New York Times as "a fierce meditation on the horrors of war and its psychological aftermath." Novelist Jonathan Coe describes it as "one of the few real masterpieces of late 20th century British fiction." British author and critic, Rosemary Dinnage reviewing in The New York Review of Books declared that it has "earned her a well-deserved place in literature" resulting in its re-issue for the centenary of the First World War. In 1995 the final book in the trilogy, The Ghost Road, won the Booker–McConnell Prize.

== Critical appraisal ==
Barker's work is described as direct, blunt and plainspoken.

In 2012, The Observer named the Regeneration Trilogy as one of "The 10 best historical novels".

== Awards and recognition ==
In 1983, Barker won the Fawcett Society prize for fiction for Union Street. In 1993 she won the Guardian Fiction Prize for the Eye in the Door, and in 1995 she won the Booker Prize for The Ghost Road. In May 1997, Barker was awarded an honorary doctorate by the Open University. She was elected a Fellow of the Royal Society of Literature in 1995.

In 2000, she was named a Commander of the Order of the British Empire (CBE).

In the review of her novel Toby's Room, The Guardian stated about her writing, "You don't go to her for fine language, you go to her for plain truths, a driving storyline and a clear eye, steadily facing the history of our world".

The Independent wrote of her, "she is not only a fine chronicler of war but of human nature".

In 2019, Barker was shortlisted for the Women's Prize for Fiction for The Silence of the Girls. In their review of the novel, The Times wrote, "Chilling, powerful, audacious . . . A searing twist on The Iliad. Amid the recent slew of rewritings of the great Greek myths and classics, Barker's stands out for its forcefulness of purpose and earthy compassion". The Guardian stated, "This is an important, powerful, memorable book that invites us to look differently not only at The Iliad but at our own ways of telling stories about the past and the present, and at how anger and hatred play out in our societies."

In July 2024, Barker was elected as an honorary Fellow of the British Academy.

In June 2025, she was named a Dame Commander of the Order of the British Empire (DBE).

== Personal life ==
In 1969 she was introduced in a pub to David Barker, a zoology professor and neurologist 20 years her senior, who left his marriage to live with her. They had two children and were married in 1978, after his divorce. Their daughter Anna Barker Ralph is a novelist. Barker was widowed in January 2009.

== List of works ==
=== Regeneration Trilogy ===
- Regeneration (1991)
- The Eye in the Door (1993)
- The Ghost Road (1995)

=== Trojan Wars series ===
- The Silence of the Girls (2018)
- The Women of Troy (2021)
- The Voyage Home (2024)

=== Standalone ===
- Union Street (1982)
- Blow Your House Down (1984)
- The Century's Daughter (also known as Liza's England; 1986)
- The Man Who Wasn't There (1988)
- Another World (1998)
- Border Crossing (2001)
- Double Vision (2003)
- Life Class (2007)
- Toby's Room (2012)
- Noonday (2015)
