= John Fairfax (poet) =

- Born: 9 November 1930; Devon
- Died: 14 January 2009 (aged 78); Reading, Berkshire
- Occupation: Poet

John Fairfax was an English poet, editor and co-founder, with John Moat, of the Arvon Foundation in 1968. Nephew of George and Kit Barker. Educated at Plymouth College, he skipped university in favour of his uncle's "collection of misfits" in Zennor, near St Ives in Cornwall. John avoided the poetry scene, quietly producing his own work.

Fairfax died in Reading on 14 January 2009.

== Poetry collections ==
- Frontier of Going (1969)
- Adrift on the Star-brow of Taliesin (1974)
- Bone Harvest Done (1980)
