= The Century's Daughter =

Novel by Pat Barker

- First edition
- Author: Pat Barker
- Language: English
- Publisher: Virago Press
- Publication place: United Kingdom

The Century's Daughter is a novel by Pat Barker, published in 1986. The novel was republished as Liza's England in 1996.

The book is critical of former Prime Minister Margaret Thatcher.
