= Marcus Reeves =

British writer and performer (born 1979)

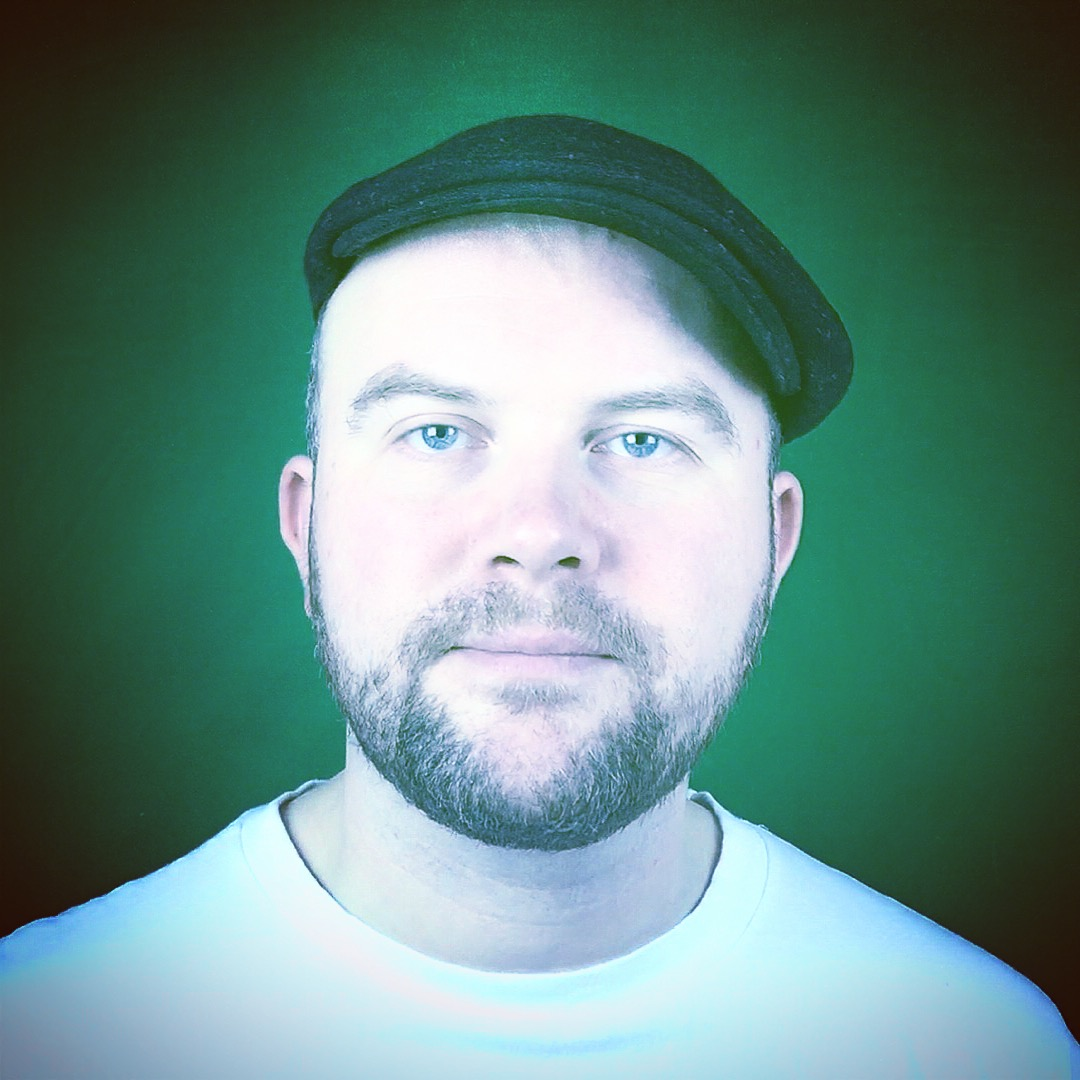

Background information
- Born: 3 February 1979 (age 47)
- Origin: Clapham, London, England
- Genres: Pop, rock, musical theatre, glam rock
- Occupations: Singer, songwriter, actor
- Instruments: Vocals, guitar
- Label: Reeves Corner
- Website: http://www.reevescorner.co.uk

Marcus Reeves (born 3 February 1979) is a London-based writer and performer.

== Biography ==
Marcus Reeves is best known as the creator of Postcards from God – The Sister Wendy Musical.

In an interview by Paul Burston in Time Out magazine in December 2010, he stated that he was working on his debut solo album, the title of which was later confirmed as Quicksilver - The Masquerade Macabre.

5 November 2012 saw the release of his debut single "Black Tears" through iTunes. The song received favourable four star reviews from blog Music Review Unsigned and gay website Polari, who drew comparisons to singers Scott Walker, Annie Lennox and Marc Almond. The song also received a five star average ratings from iTunes customers and has received airplay from stations including Newcastle Student Radio, who described Reeves as 'a modern-day David Bowie'.

1 March 2013 saw the release of his second single, "Mistaken Identity", which again received five star average ratings from iTunes customers as well as positive reviews from Independent Music News, and Zani blog, who compared the song's sound to T. Rex and early Rolling Stones.

His third single "Radio Head" was released through iTunes on 23 June 2013, again receiving high ratings from iTunes customers.

The summer of 2013, saw Reeves appear as Dr. Willy Whackoff in a small-scale production of Saucy Jack and the Space Vixens at London's Leicester Square Theatre. The production was favourably received by critics, with Reeves' performance noted as 'hilarious' by Gay Times.

Shortly afterwards, he released his fourth single "Smoke & Mirrors", a duet with Sarah-Louise Young. Quicksilver - The Masquerade Macabre was released through his own label Reeves Corner on 5 November 2013.

In February 2014, Reeves released Russian Roulette in response to news coverage of the Sochi Winter Olympics, with proceeds going to LGBT charities Stonewall, BeLonG To and International Lesbian, Gay, Bisexual, Transgender and Queer Youth and Student Organisation, which he wrote, recorded and released in ten days.

2015 saw the release of Three Little Words, a three track EP crowdfunded in support of Campaign Against Living Miserably, which was compared to early Neil Diamond and Elton John by Brixton Blog, and received airplay from local UK radio stations including Resonance FM. A live version of his debut album was released to mark the second anniversary of the initial release.

In 2016, Reeves revisited SIGHS TEN, his self-published 'chapbook' of poetry and prose, which he released as an audiobook via Spotify and Audible.

2017 brought the release of his next three track EP, Art of Darkness, featuring songs from his musical Postcards from God – The Sister Wendy Musical alongside a previously unreleased song "Gilbert & George".

In 2018, he performed the stage version of SIGHS TEN as part of the Wandsworth Fringe, featuring poems from the audiobook and songs from his back catalogue. He also released a new single, "Spotlight", with Canadian singer Alley Bilodeau and American Sean Mullaney.

2019 saw Reeves co-write and act in REPLAY, an anthology of science fiction stories at London's Lion & Unicorn Theatre, receiving positive reviews for both his performance and sound design for the production.
