= Richard Taylor (British writer) =

British religious writer

Richard Taylor (born 1967) is a British author, broadcaster and practising lawyer best known for his books, television and radio programmes on Christian imagery, symbolism, history and law.

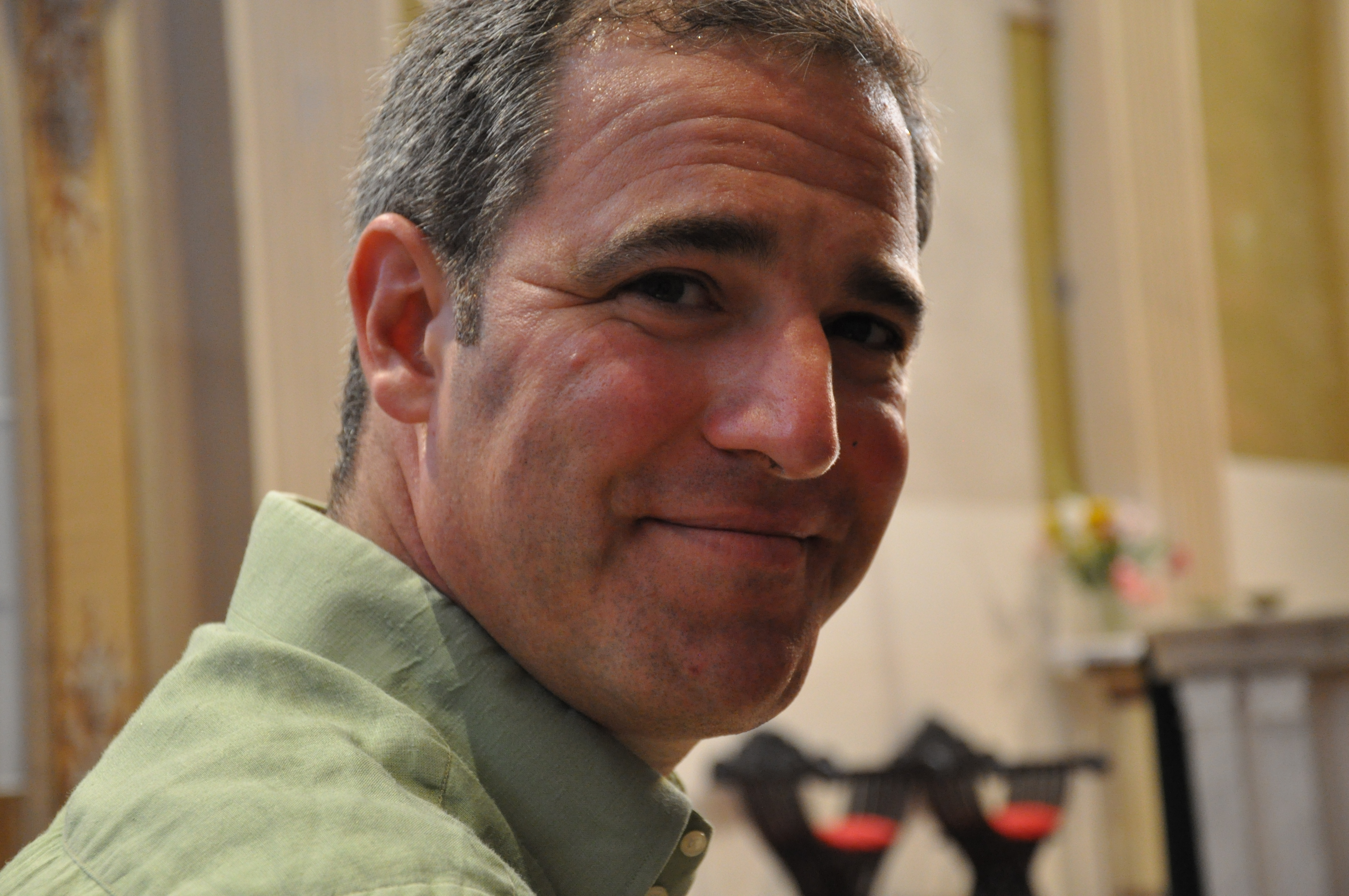
Italy, August 2011

== Biography ==
Taylor was born in London, where he attended Highgate School. He took degrees in English at St Catherine's College, Oxford, and law at the London School of Economics.

Taylor lives in Ranmoor, Sheffield, with his daughter (born 2001). He was widowed in 2016. He is a partner specialising in technology and intellectual property at law firm DLA Piper in Sheffield, and until 2012 was the IP/IT columnist for the Law Society Gazette.>

Taylor is also a Vice-President of the National Churches Trust.

== Writings and presenting ==
His book How to Read a Church has sold over 100,000 copies and been translated into five languages. He is the writer and presenter of the six-part BBC Four series Churches: How to Read Them broadcast in September and October 2010. Since 2014 he has been a guest presenter for BBC Songs of Praise, presenting items on Chaucer, Shakespeare, Austen, the Brontë family, the UK patron saints, Henry V, and the birthplaces of the Christian denominations.

He wrote and presented Still Ringing After All These Years: A Short History of Bells and Pugin: God's own architect (2012), also on BBC Four, and Copyright or Wrong on BBC Radio 4.

== Bibliography ==
- How to Read a Church. A guide to images symbols and meanings in churches and cathedrals, Rider, 2003 ISBN 1-84413-053-3
- How to Read a Church. Illustrated Edition, Rider, 2004 ISBN 1-84413-238-2
- How to Read an English Garden, Ebury, 2006 (co-author with Andrew Eburne) ISBN 0-09-190900-7
- How to Read a Church. Pocket Guide, Rider, 2007 ISBN 1-84604-073-6
- Secrets of The National Archives: The stories behind the letters and documents of our past, Ebury, 2014 ISBN 978-0091943356
