= Cragg Vale Coiners =

18th-century counterfeiters in England

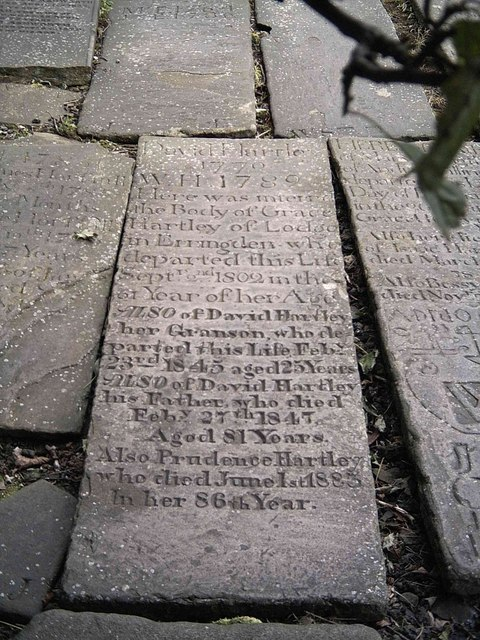
- Hartley family gravestone, Heptonstall; the inscription "David Hartley 1770" is legible at the top
- Founded: Also known as Yorkshire Coiners
- Founded by: "King" David Hartley
- Founding location: Cragg Vale, Hebden Royd, West Riding of Yorkshire, England
- Years active: 1760s
- Territory: Yorkshire
- Membership (est.): 40–200
- Criminal activities: Counterfeiting

The Cragg Vale Coiners, sometimes the Yorkshire Coiners, were a band of counterfeiters in England, based in Cragg Vale, near Hebden Bridge, West Riding of Yorkshire. They produced debased gold coins in the late 18th century to supplement small incomes from weaving.

== Activities ==
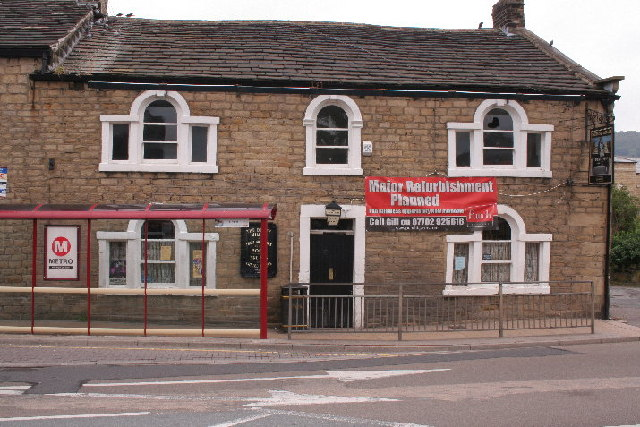
The Dusty Miller public house, Mytholmroyd, where the Coiners often met; it was here that they plotted the murder of William Dighton.

Led by "King" David Hartley, the Coiners obtained real coins from publicans, sometimes on the promise that they could "grow" the investment by smelting the original metals with base ores. They "clipped" the edges of genuine coins, leaving them only very slightly smaller, and collected the shavings. They then melted down the shavings to produce metal for counterfeits. Designs were punched into the blank "coins" with a hammer and a "coining kit". The coiners then had their accomplices place the fakes into circulation. Most of the counterfeit coins had French, Spanish or Portuguese designs.

The success of the Cragg Coiners was in part due to the remoteness of the isolated region of Yorkshire where they operated.

== Downfall ==
In 1769, William Dighton (or Deighton), a public official, investigated the possibilities of a counterfeiting gang in Cragg Vale. A coiner by the name of James Broadbent betrayed the gang by turning King's evidence and revealing the gang's existence and operations to authorities. Dighton had Hartley arrested.

Isaac Hartley, "King" David's brother, engineered a plan to have Dighton murdered, with a number of coiners subscribing a total of 100 guineas in support of the plan. On 10 November 1769, two farm hands employed by the Coiners, Matthew Normanton and Robert Thomas, ambushed Dighton in Halifax and shot him dead in Bull Close Lane.

Charles Watson-Wentworth (the Marquess of Rockingham and former Prime Minister) was tasked with hunting down the killers. He had 30 coiners arrested by Christmas Day. David Hartley was hanged at 'York Tyburn' near York on 28 April 1770, and buried in the village of Heptonstall, West Riding of Yorkshire. His brother Isaac escaped the authorities and lived until 1815. Dighton's murderers were also caught and hanged, Thomas on 6 August 1774 and Normanton on 15 April 1775.

== Known members ==
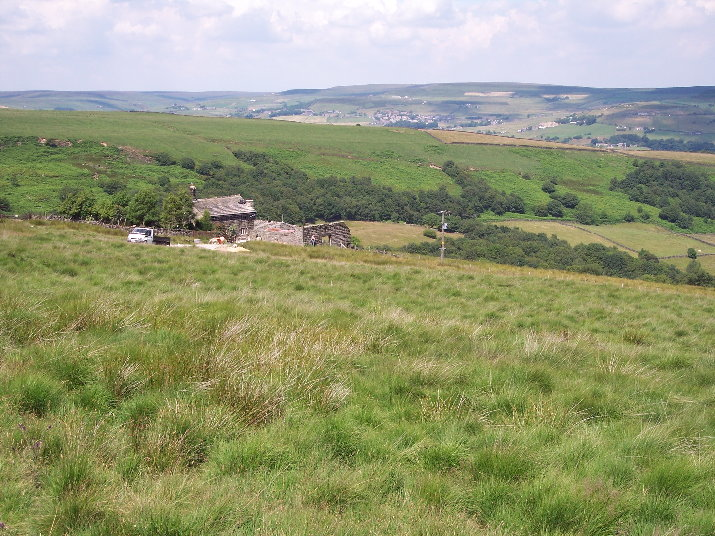
Bell House, home of David Hartley

- David Hartley, who lived at a farm called Bell House, was the leader of the gang. He was married to Grace Sutcliffe in 1764.
- Isaac Hartley, David Hartley's brother, lived at Elphaborough Hall, Mytholmroyd. Recruited Matthew Normanton and Robert Thomas to kill William Dighton
- Thomas Sunderland, Joseph Shaw and a Mr. Lightoulers were engravers for the Coiners
- James Broadbent, the informant
- Jonathon Bolton, Luke Dewhurst and Abraham Lumb were subscribers to Isaac Hartley's plan to kill Dighton along with David Hartley and Isaac himself
- Other Coiners included John Wilcock, Thomas Clayton, Matthew Normanton, Thomas Spencer and James Oldfield.

== See also ==
- The Gallows Pole, historical novel and TV series
