= Arvon Foundation =

UK charitable foundation providing writing courses

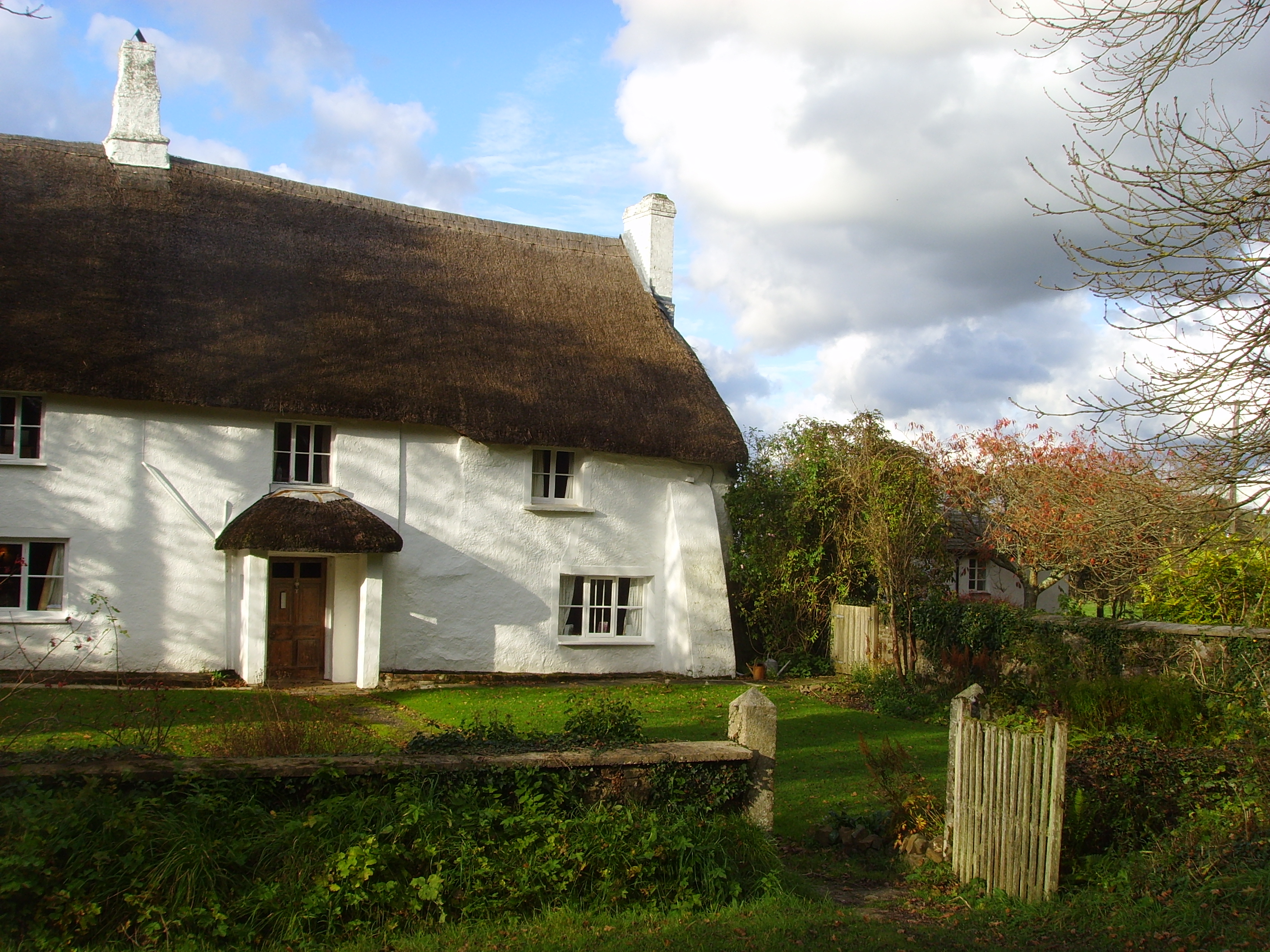
Totleigh Barton Manor, Sheepwash, Devon, one of the writing centres of the Arvon Foundation.

The Arvon Foundation is a charitable organisation in the United Kingdom that promotes creative writing. Arvon is one of Arts Council England's National Portfolio Organisations.

Andrew Kidd is the Chief Executive Officer, and Patricia Cumper is Chair of the board of trustees.

== History ==
Arvon was founded in 1968 by two young poets, John Fairfax and John Moat. It runs residential writing courses at writing houses in three rural locations: Totleigh Barton, a 16th-century manor house in Devon; The Hurst, a manor house in Shropshire, which formerly belonged to the playwright John Osborne; and the former home of Ted Hughes, Lumb Bank, a 17th-century mill-owner's house hear Hebden Bridge, Yorkshire.

In response to the COVID-19 pandemic, the organisation established Arvon at Home, an online offering of courses. Due to its success, Arvon at Home is now considered a permanent "fourth house."

The courses and writing retreats, some open to all-comers, others specially organised with schools or partner charities, provide space and time to practise writing with guidance from published authors. The charity also operates a grant scheme for low-income writers.

Notable writers who have attended Arvon Foundation courses include Pat Barker, Tim Firth, Maggie O'Farrell (whose debut After You'd Gone began life there) and AJ Pearce.

Ruth Borthwick was Chief Executive and Artistic Director from 2009 to 2019. She was succeeded by Andrew Kidd, a former publisher of Picador and managing director of Aitken Alexander Associates and co-founder and chair of the Rathbones Folio Prize.

Each of the writing houses has its own director, while Richard Haseldine is the CFO and Operations Director.

Its national office was formerly at Free Word, a centre for literature, literacy and free expression in Farringdon, London. Free Word closed in May 2021 with its resident organisations, including Arvon, vacating. As of June 2021, Arvon's national office is based out of Clerkenwell Workshops. Its registered office is now its Lumb Bank location.

== Competition ==
The Arvon Foundation previously ran the biennial Arvon International Poetry Competition, which was first judged in 1980 by Ted Hughes, Charles Causley, Seamus Heaney and Philip Larkin. In 2010 the judges were Carol Ann Duffy, Elaine Feinstein and Sudeep Sen.
