= Regeneration (novel) =

1991 historical novel by Pat Barker

- First edition cover
- Author: Pat Barker
- Language: English
- Series: Regeneration Trilogy
- Genre: War novel
- Publisher: Viking Press
- Publication date: 30 May 1991
- Publication place: United Kingdom
- Media type: Print (hardback & paperback)
- Pages: 288 (first edition, hardback)
- ISBN: 0-670-82876-9 (first edition, hardback)
- OCLC: 27011391
- Dewey Decimal: 823/.914 20
- LC Class: PR6052.A6488 R4 1991
- Preceded by: The Man Who Wasn't There
- Followed by: The Eye in the Door

Regeneration is a historical and anti-war novel by Pat Barker, first published in 1991. The novel was a Booker Prize nominee and was described by the New York Times Book Review as one of the four best novels of the year in its year of publication. It is the first book in the Regeneration Trilogy of novels on the First World War, being followed by The Eye in the Door in 1993, and then The Ghost Road, which won the Booker Prize in 1995.

The novel explores the experience of British army officers being treated for shell shock during World War I at Craiglockhart War Hospital in south-west Edinburgh. Inspired by her grandfather's experience of World War I, Barker draws extensively on first-person narratives from the period. Using these sources, she created characters based on historical individuals present at the hospital, including poets and patients Siegfried Sassoon and Wilfred Owen, and psychiatrist W.H.R. Rivers, who pioneered treatments of post-traumatic stress disorder during and after World War I. The title of the novel refers to Rivers's research into "nerve regeneration". Barker also includes fictional characters based on the larger cultural experience of the period, including an officer who grew up in the lower classes, Billy Prior, and his girlfriend and munitions worker, Sarah Lumb.

The novel is thematically complex, exploring the effect of the War on identity, masculinity, and social structure. Moreover, the novel draws extensively on period psychological practices, emphasising Rivers's research as well as Freudian psychology. Through the novel Barker enters a particular tradition of representing the experience of World War I in literature: many critics compare the novel with other World War I novels , especially those written by women writers interested in the domestic repercussions of the war, including Rebecca West's The Return of the Soldier (1918) and Virginia Woolf's Mrs Dalloway (1925).

In 1997, the novel was adapted by Scottish screenwriter Allan Scott into a film of the same name directed by Gillies MacKinnon and starring Jonathan Pryce as Rivers, James Wilby as Sassoon, and Jonny Lee Miller as Prior. The film was highly critically acclaimed and successful in the UK and Canada, receiving nominations for a number of awards, but failed to get the marketing and distribution in the US, so made little impact.

== Background and inspiration ==
Barker had long appreciated the literary figures she draws inspiration from in the novel: in her youth, she read the World War I poetry of Sassoon and Owen, as well as Rivers's Conflict and Dream. However, Barker directly attributes the immediate inspiration for Regeneration to her husband, a neurologist familiar with the writings of Dr. W.H.R. Rivers and his experiments with nerve regeneration. In a 2004 interview with literary critic Rob Nixon in the journal Contemporary Literature, Barker also states she wrote the novel, in part, as a response to how her earlier fiction was being received; she said,

I felt I had got myself into a box where I was strongly typecast as a northern, regional, working-class, feminist—label, label, label—novelist. It's not a matter so much of objecting to the labels, but you do get to a point where people are reading the labels instead of the book. And I felt I'd got to that point. And also, I'd always wanted to write about the First World War. One of my earliest memories was of my grandfather's bayonet wound and his stories of the First World War. I knew I wanted to do that. I also knew I had to wait until I'd got a way of doing it that wasn't just a copy of what had already been done. It takes a long time to have an original idea about something which has got whole libraries devoted to it.

Other interviews also emphasise her memories of her grandfather's stories about his experience.

In her "Author's Note" for the novel, she describes the research which she used to create the novel, and how she drew on a number of sources from different period authors. The novel draws considerable inspiration from historical events. Literary critic Greg Harris describes her use of historical circumstances and historical source materials as largely, " "true" to the extent that the lives of the real-life characters, including Wilfred Owen, Siegfried Sassoon, and Robert Graves, did intertwine." Moreover, Harris argues that Barker accurately captures the psychological situation in which the characters, especially the literary characters, were producing their poetry. French literary critic Marie-Noëlle Provost-Vallet highlights different misinterpretations and anachronistic cultural references supporting a critique of the novel by blogger and critic Esther MacCallum-Stewart. However, she also notes the novel accurately assesses other parts of the historical context, such as the treatment of the World War I poets' and their poetic process.

== Genre ==
The novel has been treated both as a war novel and an anti-war novel. In her 2004 interview with critic Rob Nixon, Barker describes her conceptualisation of that boundary:

It's not an antiwar book in the very simple sense that I was afraid it might seem at the beginning. Not that it isn't an antiwar book: it is. But you can't set up things like the Somme or Passchendaele and use them as an Aunt Sally, because nobody thinks the Somme and Passchendaele were a good idea. So in a sense what we appear to be arguing about is never ever going to be what they [the characters] are actually arguing about, which is a much deeper question of honor, I think. "Honor" is another old-fashioned word like "heroism," but it's very much a key word in the book.

Moreover, because of the novel's strict adherence to history, critic Greg Harris describes the novel pushing the boundaries between historical fiction and non-fiction. In her study of the novel, Karin Westman describes the act of writing historical fiction as "a challenge" for Barker. Westman notes that Barker, at times, made deliberate choices not to preserve realism, when, for example, she omits the kinds of language and humour used by soldiers during the period. In some interviews, Barker directly challenges the characterisation of the novel as an "historical novel," suggesting that the First World War stands in for other wars and allows her to represent more unspecific war-related themes.

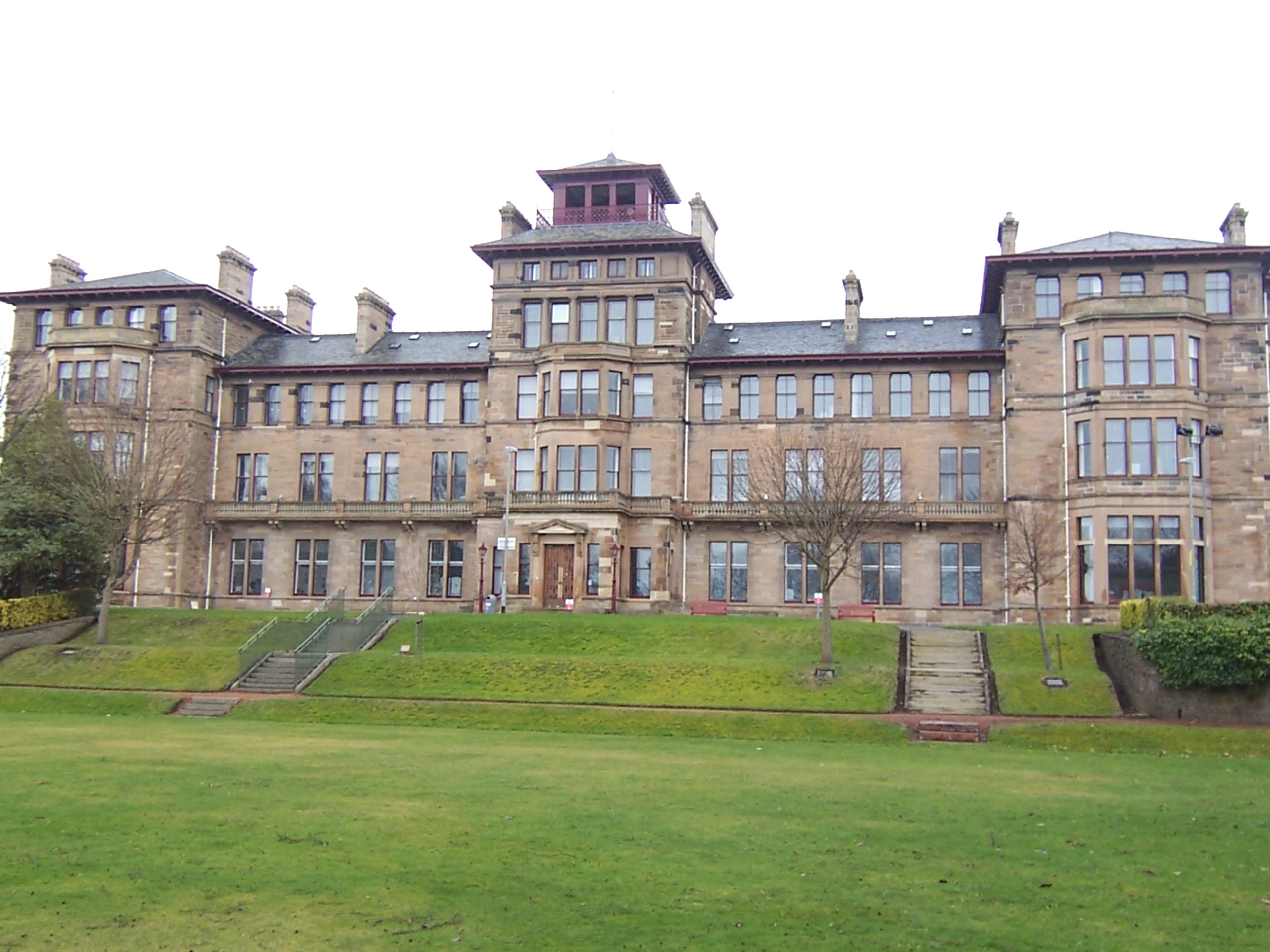
Craiglockhart War Hospital, now a part of Edinburgh Napier University

== Plot summary ==
=== Part I ===
The novel begins as Dr W. H. R. Rivers, an army psychiatrist at Craiglockhart War Hospital, learns of poet Siegfried Sassoon's declaration against the continuation of the war. A government board influenced by Sassoon's friend Robert Graves labels Sassoon as "shell-shocked" and sends him to the hospital in an effort to discredit him. Rivers feels uneasy about Sassoon entering Craiglockhart, doubting that he is shell-shocked and not wanting to shelter a conscientious objector. Soon after Sassoon arrives, Rivers meets him and they discuss why Sassoon objects to the war: he objects to its horrors, out of no particular religious belief, a common criterion for conscientious objectors. Though troubled by these horrors, Rivers affirms his duty to return Sassoon to combat. Sassoon feels conflicted about his safety at Craiglockhart while others die on the Western Front.

In addition to Sassoon's conflict, the opening chapters of the novel describe the suffering of other soldiers in the hospital. Anderson, a former surgeon, now cannot stand the sight of blood. Haunted by terrible hallucinations after being thrown into the air by an explosion and landing head first in the ruptured stomach of a rotting dead soldier, Burns experiences a revulsion to eating. Another patient, Billy Prior, suffers from mutism and will only write communications with Rivers on a notepad. Prior eventually regains his voice, but remains a difficult patient for Rivers avoiding any discussion of his war memories.

=== Part II ===
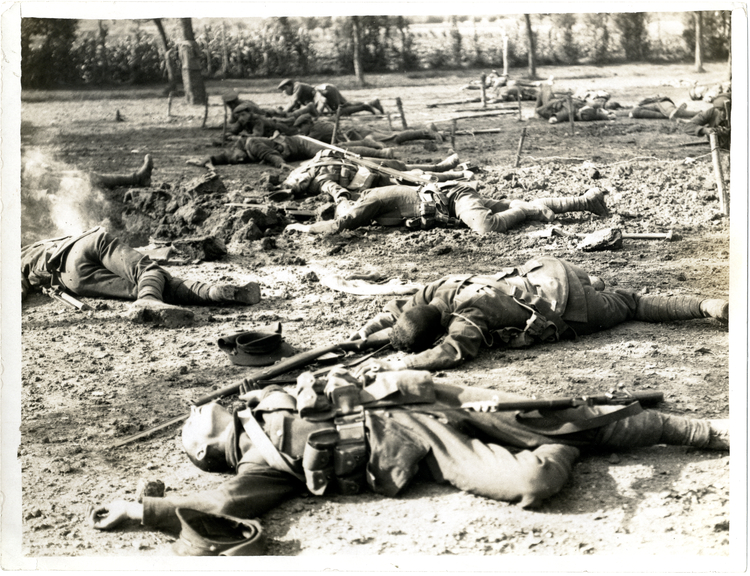
Fatalities after a charge in France during World War I. Multiple characters describe their traumatic experiences during battle, and this discussion of trauma and the broken body caused by war becomes thematically central to the novel.

At the beginning of Part II, Sassoon meets the young aspiring poet Wilfred Owen who admires Sassoon's poetry and Sassoon helps workshop Owen's poem "The Dead-Beat". Sassoon becomes Anderson's golf partner. On a day off, Prior goes into Edinburgh and meets Sarah Lumb, a munitionette whose boyfriend was killed at the Battle of Loos. They nearly have sex, but Sarah refuses Prior at the last minute. The doctors punish Prior for being gone from Craiglockhart for too long, confining him there for two weeks. During that time, Rivers tries hypnosis on Prior to help him recover his memories of the trenches.

Meanwhile, Rivers invites Sassoon to visit the Conservative Club. At the lunch, Rivers realises it will be difficult to convince Sassoon to return to the war and does not want to force him. Later, Owen convinces Sassoon to publish his poetry in the hospital magazine The Hydra. During this time, Prior meets Sarah in town and explains why he missed their meetings. Reconciled, they take a train to the seaside and walk along the beach together, where he feels relieved, though he is distracted thinking about the plight of fellow soldiers. Caught in a storm, he and Sarah have sex while sheltering in a bush. Meanwhile, Rivers, exhausted by the taxing work of caring for the shell shocked soldiers, is ordered by his superiors to holiday for three weeks away from Craiglockhart. Rivers' departure resurrects Sassoon's feelings of abandonment when his father left him, and he realises that Rivers has taken the place of his father.

=== Part III ===
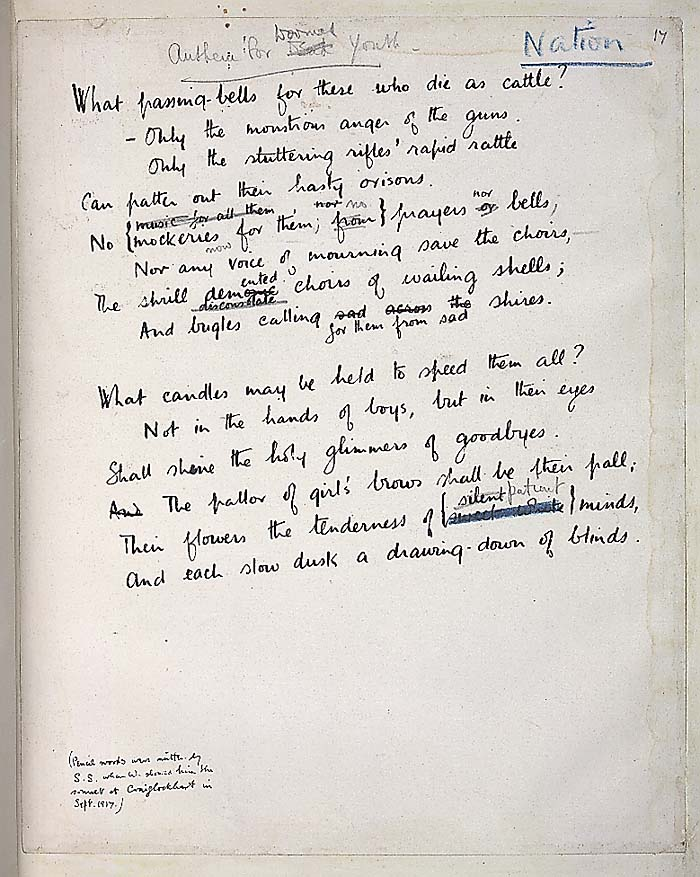
Original manuscript of Owen's "Anthem for Doomed Youth", showing Sassoon's revisions. Barker recreates the revision process for the poem in Regeneration

While away from Craiglockhart, Rivers attends church near his brother's farm and reflects on the sacrifices of younger men in the war for the desires of the older generation. Afterward, tiring labour on his brother's farm allows a cathartic release and a thorough reflection on his experiences. During one flashback, Rivers reflects on his father's role in his life, remembering his father's speech therapy practice on both himself and Charles Dodgson, who was later known by his pen name Lewis Carroll. At Craiglockhart, Sassoon helps Owen draft one of his most famous poems, "Anthem for Doomed Youth."

Meanwhile, Sarah accompanies her friend Madge to a local wounded soldier hospital. Sarah gets separated and walks into a tent housing amputee soldiers. She feels shocked that society hides these injured soldiers away. During Sarah's experience, Prior is examined by a medical board. Prior fears that they suspect he is faking illness and want to send him back to war. While away, Rivers meets with some old friends, Ruth and Henry Head, who discuss Sassoon. Rivers suggests that Sassoon has the freedom to disagree with the war. However, Rivers affirms that his job is to make Sassoon return to military duty. At the end of their conversation Head offers Rivers a job in London, which Rivers is unsure if he should take out of fear of not fulfilling his duties.

Burns, who has since been discharged from hospital, invites Rivers to visit him at his family home in seaside Suffolk. Rivers finds Burns alone. They spend a few days together. One night, during a severe thunderstorm, Burns walks outside and suffers flashbacks to his experiences with trench warfare in France. The trauma facilitates Burns' ability to talk about his frontline experience. The experience also helps Rivers decide to take the job in London, and notifies his commander at Craiglockhart. When Rivers returns, Sassoon describes his recent hallucinations of dead friends knocking on his door. Sassoon admits to guilt for not serving the soldiers and decides to return to the trenches. Rivers, though pleased with Sassoon's decision, worries about what may happen to him there.

=== Part IV ===
Starting the section, Sarah tells her mother, Ada, about her relationship with Billy Prior. Ada scolds her daughter for having sex outside marriage. A few chapters later, Sarah discovers that another munitions worker attempted a home abortion with a coat-hanger, but only harms herself. Meanwhile, Sassoon tells Graves of his decision to return to war. In the same conversation, Graves stresses his heterosexuality, leaving Sassoon feeling of unease about his own sexual orientation. During a counselling session Sassoon talks to Rivers about the official attitude towards homosexuality. Rivers theorises that during wartime the authorities are particularly hard on homosexuality, wanting to clearly distinguish between the "right" kind of love between men (loyalty, brotherhood, camaraderie), which is beneficial to soldiers, and the "wrong" kind (sexual attraction).

Soon, the medical board review the soldiers' cases deciding on their fitness for combat. Prior receives permanent home service due to his asthma. Prior breaks down, fearing that he will be seen as a coward. Sassoon, tired of waiting for his board, leaves the hospital to dine with a friends, causing conflict with Rivers. Following the medical board, Prior and Sarah meet again and admit their love. Sassoon and Owen discuss Sassoon's imminent departure and Owen is deeply affected. Sassoon comments to Rivers that Owen's feelings may be more than mere hero worship.

Rivers spends his last day at the clinic saying goodbye to his patients, then travels to London and meets Dr. Lewis Yealland from the National Hospital, who will be his colleague in his new position. Dr. Yealland uses electro-shock therapy to force patients to quickly recover from shell-shock; he believes that some patients do not want to be cured and that pain is the best method of treatment for such reluctant patients. Rivers questions whether he can work with a man who uses such techniques. Soon Sassoon is released for combat duty; Willard is able to overcome his psychosomatic paralysis and walks again; Anderson is given a staff job. The novel ends with Rivers completing his notes, meditating on the effect that the encounter with Sassoon, and the last few months, have had on him.

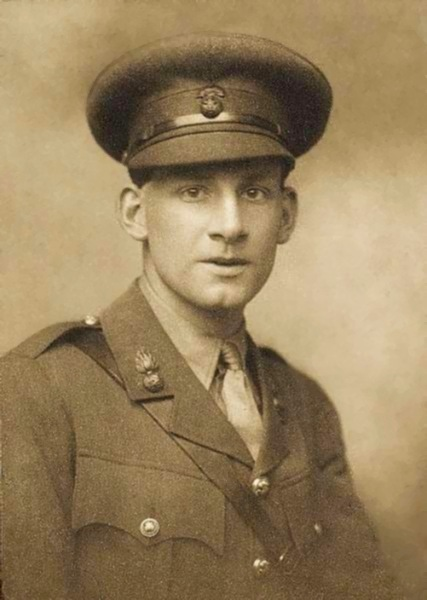
Siegfried Sassoon by George Charles Beresford (1915)

== Characters ==
Siegfried Sassoon – The fictional Siegfried Sassoon is closely based on the real Sassoon. Many reviewers of the novel describe Sassoon as the main character. Abandoned by his father as a child, the novel presents Rivers as a father-figure for Sassoon, which reflects their historical relationship. Despite Sassoon's decorated military career, his experiences in World War I caused him to publish an anti-war declaration. Although the character in Regeneration eventually returns to the front (as did the historical Sassoon), Barker depicts him as remaining deeply ambivalent about warfare. Moreover, Sassoon held ambiguous feelings about his sexuality throughout his life: though he married Hester Gatty in 1933, he had several homosexual affairs after the war.

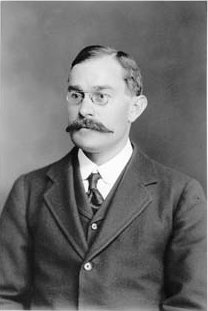
Photograph of W.H.R. Rivers

Dr. W.H.R. Rivers – Based upon the real-life W. H. R. Rivers, Rivers is an English anthropologist, neurologist, and psychiatrist who worked at Craiglockhart War Hospital between 1916 and 1917, his patients included Siegfried Sassoon amongst other literary figures. Barker describes him as the main character of the novel (though some critics emphasise Rivers or Sassoon). Historically, he experimented with treatments for nerve regeneration with Henry Head. This research inspired the title of the novel as well as some of the trilogy's major themes, such as trauma, injury, and healing. In Barker's portrayal, Rivers suffers throughout the novel from the moral dilemma that he is treating soldiers in order that they can return to war. His approach is contrasted with the harsh treatment used by Dr. Lewis Yealland. Moreover, throughout the novel Rivers is struggling with a nervous stammer he has had since childhood, even though his own father used to be a speech therapist. In an interview with journalist Wera Reusch, Barker called the historical Rivers "very humane, a very compassionate person who was tormented really by the suffering he saw, and very sceptical about the war, but at the same time he didn't feel he could go the whole way and say no, stop."

Billy Prior – Prior is one of the few purely fictional characters in the book. Prior is a soldier at Craiglockhart who suffers from mutism and asthma. According to critic Patricia Johnson, Prior's inability to speak highlights the novel's treatment of Western culture's inability to verbalise the mutilation of bodies caused by war. Prior is a working-class officer who has risen to the rank of lieutenant despite his background. Straddling the class divide, Prior sees the British army mirroring the class system, even in the trenches. Prior often envies those who are not involved in the war experience, such as Sarah, his love interest in the novel. As he develops in the Regeneration Trilogy, the novels reveal Prior as bisexual. He is a man fundamentally at war with himself: torn between his working-class roots and his army career, between his officially acknowledged love for Sarah and his "forbidden" sexual attraction towards other men, between his violent father and his fussing mother, his longing for peace and his hatred of civilians unaffected by the horrors of trench warfare.

David Burns – David Burns, another patient at Craiglockhart War Hospital, is a fictionalised version of one of Rivers' real patients who is described in the psychologist's case studies. Burns has been unable to eat after a bomb explosion threw him headlong into the gas-filled belly of a corpse, which caused him to swallow some of the rotting flesh. Critic Patricia Johnson explains that this experience of traumatic embodied experiences, epitomises the novel's strong use of visual descriptions of the war to help the reader recognise wars horrors (see the War themes section below).

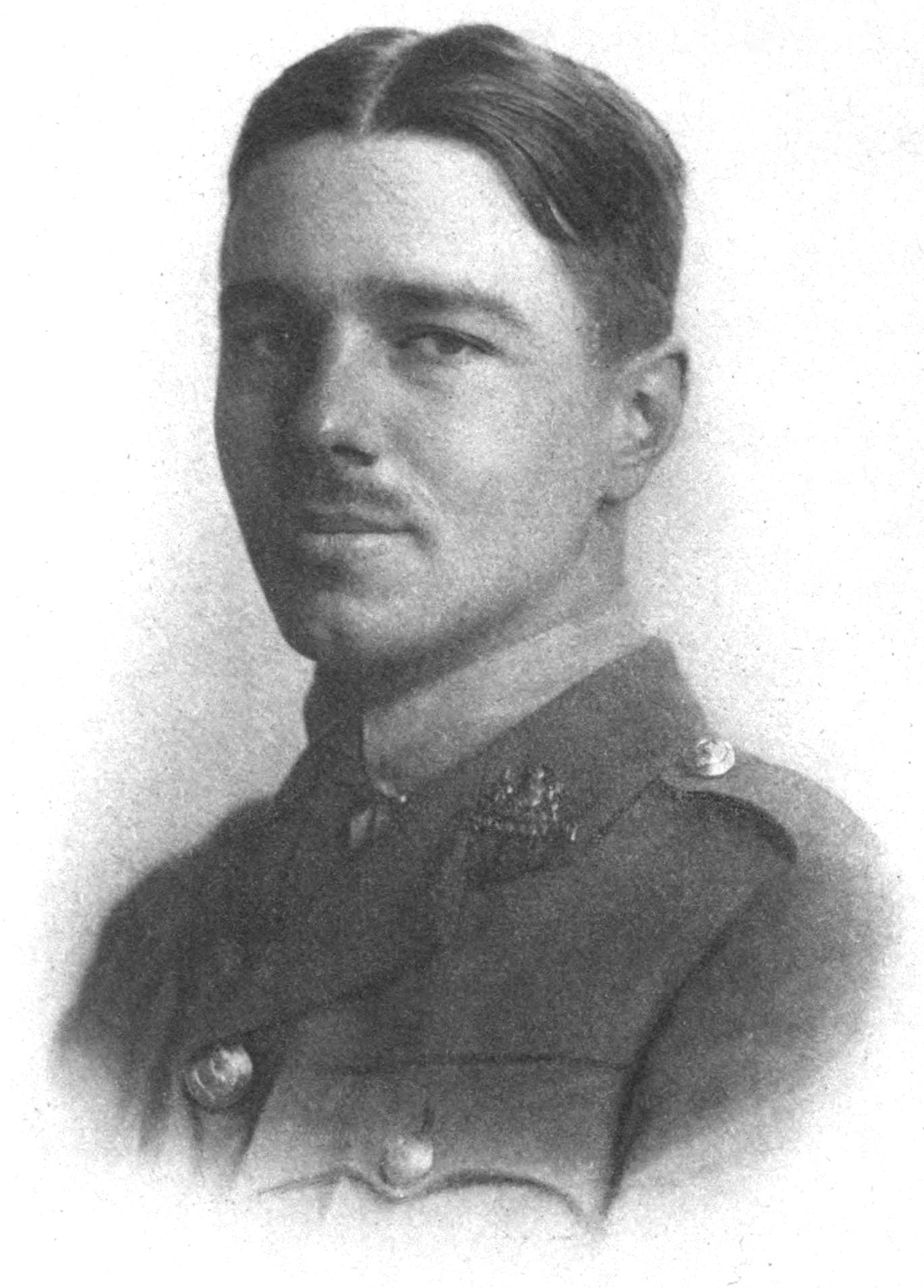
Wilfred Owen

Wilfred Owen – The fictional Owen is based upon the actual poet who died just before the end of the war in 1918. His posthumously published poems greatly increased his reputation. He is largely a peripheral character in the novel. Barker depicts Owen as initially unsure of the standard of his own poetry and asks Sassoon to help him revise them. These unrevised versions of the poems are not drafts originally by Owen, but rather versions of the poems revised by Barker. Owen's sexuality is also questioned, as Sassoon comments that Owen's feelings towards him seem to extend further than mere hero-worship.

Anderson – Anderson is another patient at Craiglockhart War hospital. Once a surgeon, Anderson's experiences of war have made it impossible to continue practising medicine because he now hates the sight of blood after experiencing a mental breakdown.

Sarah Lumb – Sarah is a completely fictional character. The girlfriend of the character Billy Prior, she is working-class, "Geordie," and works in a munitions factory in Scotland producing armaments for British soldiers. Ada Lumb, her mother, appears briefly and has a hardened attitude towards love and relationships.

Dr. Lewis Yealland – A foil to Rivers, Yealland is based on a doctor of that name at the National Hospital in London who used electro-shock therapy to treat his patients. Yealland is portrayed as arrogant and uncaring. He believes that the characters that breakdown during the war are "weak" and says that they would break down in civilian life anyway.

Callan – Callan is a patient of Dr. Yealland who has served in every major battle in World War I. He finds himself in the care of Dr. Yealland after suffering from mutism. Callan tries to fight against his doctor's treatment but eventually gives in to it.

Robert Graves – Another real life character, Graves is a fellow poet and friend of Sassoon who sees the war as unjust and immoral. However, Graves does not want to make his life more difficult by protesting. Graves sees it as his duty to serve his country regardless of his own moral beliefs.

== Major themes ==
Because Regeneration is a novel that focuses on the First World War, it explores many of the themes common to literature written during and following the war, including the cause and effects of war, the limits of ideologies like nationalism and masculinity, and both the medical and popular reactions to the psychological traumas created in the war. Critics have treated each of these extensively. Moreover, because much of Barker's earlier work was historical fiction about women, critics often comment on her treatment of women in the novel.

=== War ===
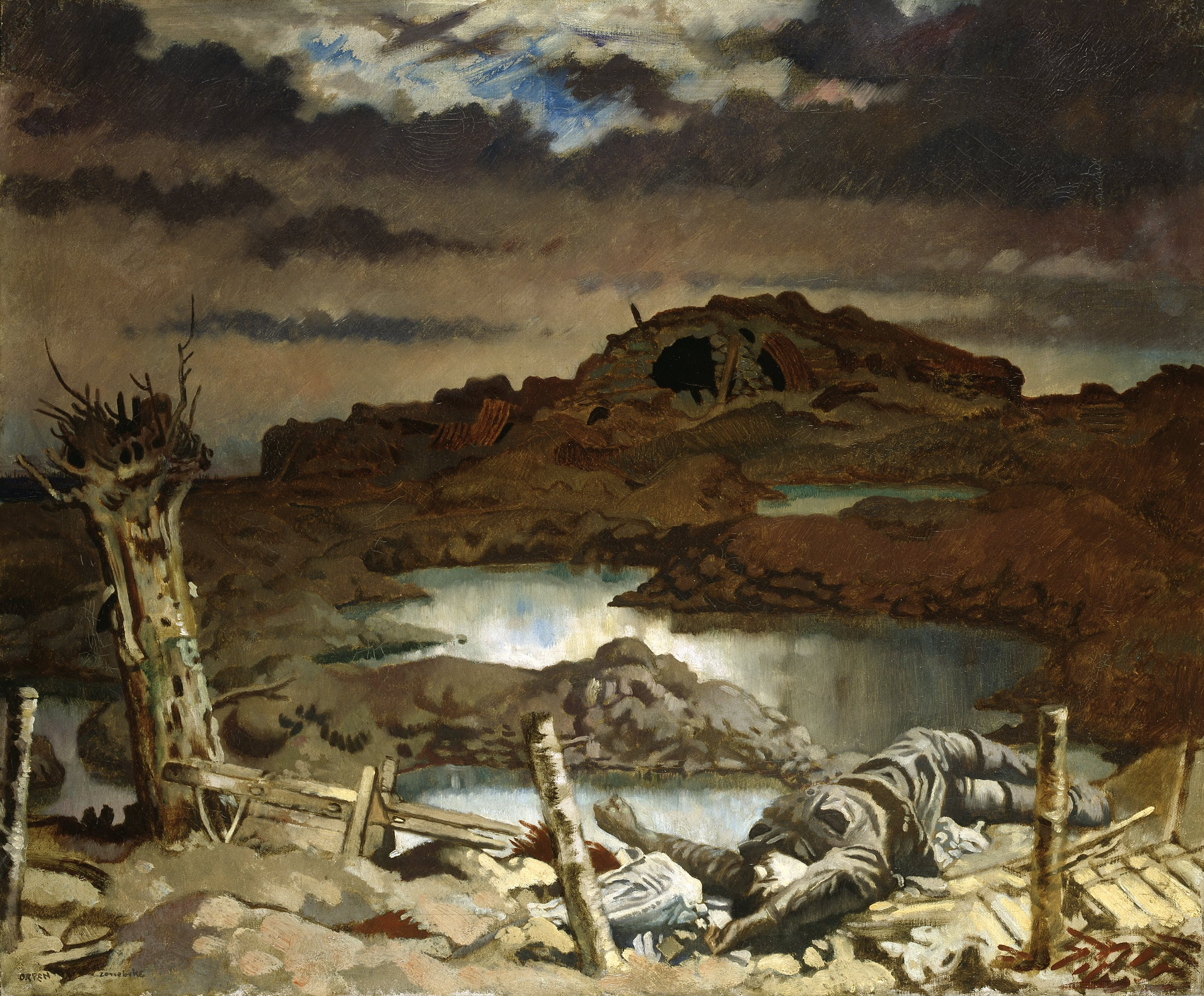
Zonnebeke, Flanders, Belgium, 1918, Tate Gallery. The treatment of soldiers who witnessed horrifying battlefield scenes, like the one depicted here by Irish artist William Orpen, is a central part of Regeneration's focus.

The novel extensively focuses on the effects of losses during wartime. As The Guardian noted when discussing her awards for The Ghost Road, the series gave her the reputation as "The woman who understood war". Barker stated in an interview with Wera Reusch that "The trilogy is trying to tell something about the parts of war that don't get into the official accounts". She goes on to state that "One of the things that impresses me is that two things happen to soldiers in war: a) they get killed or b) they come back more or less alright. It's really focusing on the people who do come back but don't come back alright, they are either physically disabled or mentally traumatised."

One of the focuses of the novel is on how combatants perceive their experiences. In her article discussing the novel's representation of death, literary critic Patricia E. Johnson describes how contemporary society tends to make the casualties and experience of war more abstract, making it hard for non-combatants to imagine the losses. Johnson argues that the entire Regeneration Trilogy breaks the boundaries created by modern society's abstraction of war and its casualties because "mutilation and death are re-presented in a ways that escape warfare's typical conceptual categories, thus ..."realising" modern warfare by reconnecting language and material substance." In discussing the first novel specifically, Johnson highlights how the book "repeatedly employs synecdoche" to emphasise the visceral experiences, by describing eviscerated human flesh and how the characters respond to those experiences. She describes experiences like Burns's horrifying head first disembowelment of a corpse as allowing the readers to understand two things: first, that memories of the combatants are recorded in terms of their relationship to actual people, rather than in the vague ideas of people represented by war memorials; and second, the conceptual opposition in Western culture between flesh or body parts and the social definition of a person (for further discussion of this philosophical issue see Mind-body problem).

=== Ideology ===
Much of the novel explores the types of cultural ideologies, like nationalism and masculinity, that facilitated the War. Barker states that she chose to write about World War I "because it's come to stand in for other wars, as a sort of idealism of the young people in August 1914 in Germany and in England. They really felt this was the start of a better world. And the disillusionment, the horror and the pain followed that. I think because of that it's come to stand for the pain of all wars." Critic Kaley Joyes argues that choices like the inclusion of the work by poet Wilfred Owen in the novel, whose life has been romanticised as "an expressive exemplar of the war's tragic losses," highlights this thematic interest in breaking down the common ideological interpretations of the war.

==== Masculinity ====
The tension between traditional models of masculinity and the experiences within the war runs throughout the novel. Critic Greg Harris identifies Regeneration, along with the other two novels in the trilogy, as profiling the non-fictional experience of Sassoon and other soldiers who must deal with ideas of masculnity. These characters feel conflicted by a model of masculinity common to Britain during this time: honour, bravery, mental strength, and confidence were privileged "manly" characteristics. Yet they explore, internally and through conversation, what that model means for them and how the war changes how they should experience it. In an interview with Barker in Contemporary Literature, Rob Nixon distinguishes between these ideas of "manliness" and the concept of masculinity as providing a larger definition for identity. Barker agrees with his assessment, saying, "and what's so nice about them is that they use it so unself-consciously: they must have been the last generation of men who could talk about manliness without going "ugh" inside."

In his discussion of the novel, Harris describes this "manliness" as becoming, for Barker's characters, an "unrealistic militaristic-masculine ideals"; practices such as the deliberate repression of emotion consume the novel's characters and create psychological instability, as well as being the cause of extensive discrimination during the war. Harris highlights how this thematic treatment fairly represents how the question of masculine identity effected Sassoon and other shell-shocked World War I soldiers. Harris also describes Barker, as author, and Rivers, as a period innovator, demonstrating how the use of therapy on soldiers offers an opportunity to shape and rethink this model of masculinity. The idea of reintegrating emotions, in relation to questions about the nature of masculinity, are an important part of the novel; Barker focuses on the same type of emotional reintegration that historians have identified in River's actual methods for treating victims of the war.

=== Psychology and trauma ===
The novel's use of a mental hospital as the main setting, along with psychologist Rivers' treatments of soldiers and their war trauma, focuses much of the novel on the psychological effects of war. In doing so, the novel follows in the tradition of novels like The Return of the Soldier (1918) and Mrs. Dalloway (1925). Many critics focus on this interest in the effects of trauma. For instance, Ankhi Mukherjee describes the failure of characters to turn their memories into a narrative through the medium of talk therapy. Mukherjee describes River's approach to therapy as "autogenesis," or self-understanding through structuring their reaction to traumatic experiences.

Sigmund Freud is an important influence on the novel's approach to psychology, and this influence has roots in the historical context of the novel, because Rivers was influenced by the writings of Freud on neurosis and Sassoon wrote about the experience of Freudian psychoanalysis in his Sherston's Progress. While Rivers disagreed that neurosis was due to sexual factors he considered Freud's work to be of "direct practical use in diagnosis and treatment". Craiglockhart's approach to compassionate talk therapy had roots in the Freudian treatments of hysteria, using tools such as expressing compassionate understanding for patients and helping patients interpret dreams.

=== Women and the domestic ===
Some critics have written extensively on the place of women within the novel, even though it focuses on men. In part this is because Barker's previous novels focus on working-class women's history. In her companion to the novel, Karin Westman sees the novel as a response by Barker to critics stereotyping her as only being interested in writing about women. However, Baker has repeatedly talked about how this novel has connected with her earlier interests in feminism. Barker describes the novel as providing a voice for the home front, stating, that "In a lot of books about war by men the women are totally silenced. The men go off and fight and the women stay at home and cry; basically, this is the typical feature. And the women in the trilogy are always deeply significant, and whatever they say in whatever language they say it in, it is always meant to be listened to very carefully." In particular, Barker is interested in the contradictions placed on women's expectations during war period, and its history; for example, she points out that the women in the munitions factories are expected to produce weapons to kill thousands, but a woman who attempts to abort her unborn child is criticised.

The female perspectives within the novel is rare in war fiction and provides a larger sense of the domestic repercussions. Critic Ronald Paul notes that Regeneration and its sequels are some of the first novels since Rebecca's West's The Return of the Soldier or Virginia Woolf's Mrs. Dalloway that deal with the repercussions of the war and whose author was not a male soldier. Paul describes such novels, which deal explicitly with domestic effects of shell shock, as part of Barker's self-described "very much female view of war".

== Intertextuality ==
The novel, like its two sequels, relies heavily on allusion to, and appropriation of, both historical and literary texts. The "Author's note" for each novel, as critic Allistair M. Duckworth points out, explicitly outlines historical texts that Barker relied on when writing that novel. Critic Kaley Joyes describes much of the novel's reading experience as dependent on knowledge of the other texts. Not all the texts represented in the novel are exact copies. Joyes highlights how Barker alters Wilfred Owen's poems so that the reader can witness Owen and Sassoon revise them at Craiglockhart. Joyes argues the subtle use of intertextuality with Owen's works as well as other texts allows Barker to engage politically in a metatextual move similar to those identified by Linda Hutcheon in her A Poetics of Postmodernism — in which Hutcheon describes how fictional texts can question the nature of the historical process, alongside other forms of knowledge, through the means of both explicit and implicit commentary on the construction of that knowledge. According to Joyes, Barker's revisions "destabilize eyewitness privilege and emphasizes narration's accessibility."

The following are some of the most prominent intertextual components in the novel:

- Part of Barker's primary inspiration for the novel are the accounts of the time Sassoon spent at Craiglockhart, as described by Rivers in his book Conflict and Dreams. To give anonymity to Sassoon Rivers refers to him as "Patient B".
- Sassoon refers to Edward Carpenter's writing on sexuality The Intermediate Sex, and it is implied that Sassoon is a homosexual because he states that such works made him feel normal about his sexuality.
- The women in the bar, including Sarah Lumb, are based on characters from a scene in T. S. Eliot's The Waste Land.
- Prior reads one of River's anthropological studies The Todas.
- Owen and Sassoon frequently discuss Craiglockhart's in-house publication The Hydra, which published some of their poems.
- A number of Wilfred Owen's poems are in the text. Owen and Sassoon are shown working on Owen's famous poem "Anthem for Doomed Youth" together. Barker also revises Owen's "The Dead-Beat" as well as using "The Parable of the Old Man and the Young" and "Disabled", but, according to critic Kaley Joyes, she does this "without drawing attention to her intertextual actions." According to Joyes, Barker describes Owen's as often received as an " iconic status as an expressive exemplar of the war's tragic losses". Joyes posits that Barkers' subtle uses of some of Owen's poems may be an attempt for circumventing the "preexisting myth" about him and his work.
- Literary critic Alistair M. Duckworth describes the novel building on narratives and thematic elements found in both Robert Graves's Good-Bye to All That (1929) and Edmund Blunden's Undertones of War (1928).

== Reception and sales ==
On 5 November 2019, the BBC News listed Regeneration on its list of the 100 most influential novels. According to academic critic Karin Westman, Regeneration was "well received by reviewers in both the UK and the United States." Beyond frequent praise, the main points discussed often related to the veracity of Barker's depiction of the War period and about her role as a woman writer, along with the connections of this work to her previous novels. Westman argues that many of these critics judged Barker's work on "content rather than style", so that this work allowed her to break from her earlier classification as a regional, working-class feminist into the "(male) canon of British literature". The novel was even one of the "best novels of 1992", according to the New York Times.

Writing in 2001, Westman describes the novel selling well in the ten years since its publication. She also notes that the novel's success was likely due to an increased interest in "remembrance" of the Great War, the success of the subsequent novels in the trilogy, and its appeal to a wide variety of readers. Subsequently, the 1997 film adaptation also succeeded in the United Kingdom and Canada receiving several rewards. However, the film was not successful in the United States and Westman attributes this to poor timing and a small distribution.

== See also ==
- Benediction (film) – 2021 biographical drama film
