= Peter Firth =

English actor (born 1953)

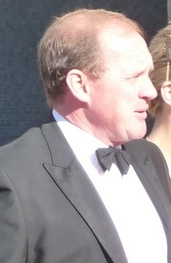
- Firth at the 2009 BAFTA Awards
- Born: Peter Macintosh Firth; 27 October 1953 (age 73); Bradford, West Riding of Yorkshire, England
- Occupation: Actor
- Years active: 1958–present
- Spouse: Alexandra Pigg (m. 2017)

Peter Macintosh Firth (born 27 October 1953) is an English actor. He is known for his role as Sir Harry Pearce in the BBC One programme Spooks (titled MI-5 in some countries); he is the only actor to have appeared in every episode of the programme's ten-series lifespan. He has given many other television and film performances, most notably as Alan Strang in Equus (1977), for which he won a Golden Globe Award and received an Academy Award nomination.

== Early life ==
Firth was born on 27 October 1953 in Bradford, West Riding of Yorkshire, the son of publicans Mavis (née Hudson) and Eric Macintosh Firth. He attended Hanson School in Bradford.

== Career ==
=== Child actor and early roles ===
Firth was a leading child actor by the middle of 1969, having starred in the first series of The Flaxton Boys as Archie Weekes and then the following year in the series Here Come the Double Deckers!, both of which featured child actors in the leading roles. Firth played Scooper, the leader of the gang. In 1972 he also starred in the ITV (London Weekend Television) series The Adventures of Black Beauty, episode "The Runaway", playing David Abbott.

In July 1973, Firth appeared at Laurence Olivier's National Theatre, starring in the stage version of Peter Shaffer's play Equus as a teenager being treated by a psychiatrist, and in October 1974 repeated the role in the Broadway production, receiving a Tony Award nomination for his performance as Alan Strang.

Firth starred in an episode of The Protectors, titled “Implicado”, first screened in November 1973. He played Stephen Douglas, an innocent young man, alongside Patrick Mower as a drug dealer.

=== Later roles ===
Firth's first major role as an adult was the title part in a BBC Television Play of the Month adaptation of Oscar Wilde's novel The Picture of Dorian Gray (1976). The script was based on a stage adaptation by John Osborne, and also starred Jeremy Brett and John Gielgud. That same year saw the release of the World War I film Aces High which featured Firth as the inexperienced RFC pilot Lt. Stephen Croft.

Firth played the lead role in the film adaptation of Henry Fielding's Joseph Andrews (1977). That same year he starred with Richard Burton in the film adaptation of Equus. The film was only a moderate box-office success, but earned Firth a nomination for the Academy Award for Best Supporting Actor and a Golden Globe Award in the same category. Further film work quickly followed, most notably Roman Polanski's Tess (1979).

Other film work has included roles in Diamonds on Wheels (1973); When You Comin' Back, Red Ryder? (1979); Lifeforce (1985); Letter to Brezhnev (1985); Northanger Abbey (1987), playing Henry Tilney; The Hunt for Red October (1990) playing the Soviet political officer Ivan Putin murdered early in the film; White Angel (1993), playing mild-mannered dentist Leslie Steckler; Amistad (1997) playing the strongly anti-slavery Captain Fitzgerald of the Royal Navy; Mighty Joe Young (1998); Pearl Harbor (2001); and The Greatest Game Ever Played (2005), playing Lord Northcliffe.

Along with his film career, Firth has continued to appear in television productions, with several notable credits in various high-profile dramas. He starred in two science-fiction episodes of the BBC's Play for Today anthology series as the eponymous time-traveller in the romantic The Flipside of Dominick Hide (1980), and its sequel, Another Flip for Dominick (1982). Firth also had a starring role in Tales of the Unexpected in 1981. In 1994, in the Fourth Series of Heartbeat, he played Dr. Radcliffe who partnered with Dr. Rowan (Niamh Cusack) in Whitby. He also portrayed the Emperor Vespasian in "The Jewish Revolt" episode of the BBC series Ancient Rome: The Rise and Fall of an Empire.

For many years he had played a primary role as senior MI5 officer Harry Pearce in the BBC's popular spy drama series Spooks (2002–2011), and played Fred Hoyle in Hawking, a BBC dramatisation of the early career of Stephen Hawking. He was also Snaith in the three-part series South Riding in 2011. Firth has also appeared on American and Canadian television, on programmes such as Law & Order: Special Victims Unit and Total Recall 2070, as well as in television films such as The Incident starring Walter Matthau.

In 2014, Firth played the part of the character Andrew Rawlins in Undeniable, a two-part series made for the ITV network. In 2015, he played Jacob Marley in four episodes of the BBC television series Dickensian. In 2016, he played the part of Ernest Augustus, Duke of Cumberland and King of Hanover, in ITV's drama series Victoria. In 2018, he played Milos Borisovich, a Belarusian drug lord, in the action series Strike Back: Retribution.

=== Audiobooks ===
Firth is also a narrator of audiobooks. He has been responsible for performances reading Pat Barker's Regeneration, The Ghost Road and The Eye in the Door, Suspicion by Robert McCrum, Maurice by E. M. Forster, Brave New World by Aldous Huxley, Sebastian Faulks' Birdsong and Thomas Hardy's Tess of the d'Urbervilles.

== Honours and awards ==
In July 2009, Firth was awarded an honorary degree by the University of Bradford as a Doctor of Letters for his services to acting, having been nominated by the School of Computing, Informatics & Media; he received his award during the school's degree ceremony.

== Personal life ==
Firth lodged with Peter Shaffer throughout the Broadway run of Equus, in a father–son relationship.

Firth was interviewed with his Letter to Brezhnev co-star Alexandra Pigg on BBC Breakfast in April 2017, during which Firth explained that they dated briefly after making the film and that they have been in a relationship since 2010. They married in London on Christmas Eve 2017.

In Series 12, episode 11 of Top Gear, Firth was the Star in a Reasonably Priced Car, alongside Spooks co-star Adam Penry-Jones. He posted a lap time of 1:47.1.

== Filmography ==
=== Film ===
Year	Title	Role	Notes
1972	Brother Sun, Sister Moon		
1972	Daniel and Maria		
1975	King Arthur, the Young Warlord	Corin	
1976	Aces High	Lt Stephen Croft	
1977	Joseph Andrews	Joseph Andrews	
1977	Equus	Alan Strang	Golden Globe Award for Best Supporting Actor - Motion Picture; Kansas City Film Critics Circle Award for Best Supporting Actor; Nominated — Academy Award for Best Supporting Actor
1979	When You Comin' Back, Red Ryder?	Stephen Ryder	
1979	Tess	Angel Clare	
1981	Fire and Sword	Dinas	Original title: "Feuer und Schwert - Die Legende von Tristan und Isolde"
1984	Sword of the Valiant	Sir Gawain	Voice: uncredited
1984	White Elephant	Peter Davidson	
1985	Lifeforce	Col Colin Caine	
1985	Letter to Brezhnev	Peter	
1986	A State of Emergency	Kenneth Parrish	
1987	Born of Fire	Paul Bergson	Science Fiction
1987	Northanger Abbey	Henry Tilney	
1987	1988	Prisoner of Rio	Clive Ingram
1989	Tree of Hands	Terence	
1989	Trouble in Paradise	Adriaan	
1990	The Hunt for Red October	Senior Lieutenant Ivan Putin	The political officer of the Red October
1990	Burndown	Jake Stern	
1990	The Rescuers Down Under	Red	Voice
1992	The Pleasure Principle	Dick	
1993	El marido perfecto	Franz	
1993	Shadowlands	Dr Craig	
1994	White Angel	Leslie Steckler	
1995	An Awfully Big Adventure	Bunny	
1996	Merisairas	1st Officer Ronald Jensen	
1997	Marco Polo: The Missing Chapter	Rusticello	
1997	Gaston's War	Major Smith	
1997	Amistad	Captain Fitzgerald	
1998	Woundings	Louise's Attacker	
1998	Mighty Joe Young	Garth	
1999	Chill Factor	Colonel Andrew Brynner	
2001	Pearl Harbor	Capt. Mervyn Bennion	
2005	The Greatest Game Ever Played	Lord Northcliffe	
2010	World Without End	Sir Roland	
2015	Spooks: The Greater Good	Harry Pearce	Film adaptation of BBC TV series.
2016	Risen	Pontius Pilate	
2016	Happily Ever After	Walt	

=== Television ===
Year	Title	Role	Notes
1969	How We Used to Live	Urchin	Episode: "At the Seaside"
1969	The Flaxton Boys	Archie Weeks	13 episodes
1970–1971	Here Come the Double Deckers!	Scooper	17 episodes
1970–1971	The Doctors	Charlie Higson	7 episodes
1972	The Magistrate	Cis Farringdon	BBC Play of the Month
1972	The Adventures of Black Beauty	David Abbott	Episode: "Runaway"
1972–1973	Country Matters	Roger Blackburn/Tommy Adams	2 episodes
1973	Owen, M.D.	David Redman	Episode: "The Love Game"
1973	Scene	Ben Bagot	Episode: "The Ballad of Ben Bagot"
1973	The Protectors	Stephen Douglas	Episode: "Implicado"
1973	Her Majesty's Pleasure	Arsenic	BBC1 Play for Today
1973	Arthur of the Britons	Corin	Episode: "The Pupil"
1973	Diamonds on Wheels	Robert 'Bobby' Stewart	TV film - Disney
1976	The Picture of Dorian Gray	Dorian Gray	BBC Play of the Month
1976	The Lady of the Camellias	Armand Duval	2 episodes
1980	Tales of the Unexpected	Hardy	Episode: "The Man at the Top"
1980-1982	Play for Today	Dominick Hide	2 episodes, including The Flipside of Dominick Hide
1983	The Aerodrome	Roy	TV film
1987	Tickets for the Titanic	Michael	Episode: "The Way, the Truth, the Video"
1987	Northanger Abbey	Henry Tilney	BBC Screen Two
1990	The Incident	Geiger	TV film
1990	Children Crossing	Joe	BBC Screen Two
1990	Blood Royal: William the Conqueror	William Rufus	TV film
1991	Murder in Eden	Kenneth Potter	Miniseries
1991	The Laughter of God	Steve Clemant	BBC Screen Two
1991	Prisoner of Honor	Major Henry	TV film
1993	The Young Indiana Jones Chronicles	Stefan	Episode: "Istanbul, September 1918"
1994	Anna Lee	Peter Wainwright	Episode: "Stalker"
1994	Highlander: The Series	Arthur Drake, aka Drakov	Episode: "Warmonger"
1994	Heartbeat	Dr. James Radcliffe	7 episodes
1995	Resort to Murder	Peter Dennigan	TV mini series
1995	Soldier Soldier	Major Ben Collins	Episode: "Leaving"
1996	The Witch's Daughter	Mr Jones	TV film
1996	Band of Gold	Brian Roberts	4 episodes
1996	And the Beat Goes On	Francis	4 episodes
1997	Holding On	Mick	TV mini series
1997	The Broker's Man	Alex 'Godzilla' Turnbull	4 episodes
1997	Kavanagh QC	Charlie Beck	Episode: "Ancient History"
1997	The Garden of Redemption	Nazi Commandant	TV film
1998	Dead Man's Gun	Det. Insp. Archibald McCann	Episode: "The Ripper"
1999	The Magnificent Seven	Federal Marshal Walter Bryce	Episode: "The New Law"
1999	Cracker	Mitchell Grady	Episode: "Best Boys"
1999	Total Recall 2070	Vincent Nagle	3 episodes
2000	The Magicians	Simon Magus	TV film
2000–2001	That's Life	Victor Leski	20 episodes
2002	Me & Mrs Jones	Benedict	TV film
2002	The Vice	Keith Beaumont	Episode: "No Man's Land"
2002–2011	Spooks	Harry Pearce	86 episodes (only actor to appear in all episodes)
2004	Hawking	Sir Fred Hoyle	TV film
2005	Law & Order: Special Victims Unit	Preston Blair	Episode: "Identity"
2006	Ancient Rome: The Rise and Fall of an Empire	Vespasian	TV mini series documentary
2006	The Battle for Rome	Vespasian	TV mini series
2011	South Riding	Anthony Snaith	TV mini series
2012	World Without End	Sir Roland	
2013	Mayday	Malcolm Spicer	
2014	Undeniable	Andrew Rawlins	
2014	Lives of the Infamous Comedy Blaps	Narrator	TV mini series
2015–2016	Dickensian	Jacob Marley	
2016	Victoria	Duke of Cumberland	
2018	Strike Back: Retribution	Milos Borisovich	TV series
2019	Cheat	Michael	TV series
2019	Summer of Rockets	Tezler	TV series
2024	Shardlake	Thomas Howard, 3rd Duke of Norfolk	TV series

== Video games ==
Year	Title	Role	Notes
2000	Star Wars: Force Commander	Capt. Beri Tulon	Real-time strategy video game

== Audiobooks ==
Year	Title	Author	Un-/Abridged	Notes
1996	After Hannibal	Barry Unsworth	Unabridged	
1997	Brave New World	Aldous Huxley	Unabridged	
1997	Suspicion	Robert McCrum	Unabridged	
2005	Tess of the d'Urbervilles	Thomas Hardy	Unabridged	2 hrs and 49 mins
2008	Tess of the d'Urbervilles	Thomas Hardy	Unabridged	14 hrs and 42 mins
2009	Witness	Nick Warburton	Unabridged	One of four narrators
2010	Maurice	E. M. Forster	Unabridged	
2011	Birdsong	Sebastian Faulks	Unabridged	
2015	Amok: An Audible Original Drama	Sebastian Fitzek	Unabridged	One of six narrators
2019	Regeneration	Pat Barker	Unabridged	Regeneration Trilogy - Book 1
2019	The Eye in the Door	Pat Barker	Unabridged	Regeneration Trilogy - Book 2
2019	The Ghost Road	Pat Barker	Unabridged	Regeneration Trilogy - Book 3

== See also ==
- List of Academy Award winners and nominees from Great Britain
- List of actors with Academy Award nominations
- List of Golden Globe winners
