= Regeneration Trilogy =

Series of historical novels by Pat Barker

The Regeneration Trilogy is a series of three novels by Pat Barker on the subject of the final part of the First World War, focusing primarily on 1917 and 1918. The novels blend fact and fiction, hanging on a framework of factual events, an interwoven set of fictional story-lines of real people with fictional characters. The first novel of the series Regeneration was published in 1991, followed by The Eye in the Door (1993) and The Ghost Road (1995).

The broad themes outlined across the three books are the modernisation of medicine in the treatment of trauma and mental illness with its differing application in relation to social class — the progressive and considerate cutting-edge Freudian treatment for officers versus the regressive, aggressive, and brutal aversion therapy for the lower ranks. Also, the theme of sexuality — hetero-, bi-, and homo-sexuality — is prevalent throughout and its interplay again across the social classes.

The main characters are:

- Dr William Rivers, the noted Freudian psychiatrist and neurologist in the British Army
- Siegfried Sassoon, the distinguished war hero and famous war poet and patient of Rivers
- Billy Prior, a fictional lieutenant from a working class background suffering from gross war trauma and patient of Rivers

In 2012, The Observer named the trilogy in its entirety as one of "The 10 best historical novels".

== Regeneration (1991) ==
Regeneration is a historical and anti-war novel by Pat Barker, first published in 1991. The novel was a Booker Prize nominee and was described by the New York Times Book Review as one of the four best novels of the year in its year of publication. It is the first book in the Regeneration Trilogy of novels on the First World War, being followed by The Eye in the Door in 1993, and then The Ghost Road, which won the Booker Prize in 1995.

The novel explores the experience of British army officers being treated for shell shock during World War I at Craiglockhart War Hospital in south-west Edinburgh. Inspired by her grandfather's experience of World War I, Barker draws extensively on first person narratives from the period. Using these sources, she created characters based on historical individuals present at the hospital including poets and patients, Siegfried Sassoon and Wilfred Owen, and psychiatrist W.H.R. Rivers, who pioneered treatments of post-traumatic stress disorder during and after World War I. The title of the novel refers to Rivers' research into "nerve regeneration". Barker also includes fictional characters, based on the larger cultural experience of the period, including an officer who grew up in the lower classes, Billy Prior, and his girlfriend and munitions worker, Sarah Lumb.

The novel is thematically complex, exploring the effect of the War on identity, masculinity, and social structure. Moreover, the novel draws extensively on period psychological practices, emphasising Rivers's research as well as Freudian psychology. Through the novel Barker enters a particular tradition of representing the experience of World War I in literature: many critics compare the novel to other World War I novels , especially those written by women writers interested in the domestic repercussions of the war, including Rebecca West's The Return of the Soldier (1918) and Virginia Woolf's Mrs Dalloway (1925). Barker both drew on those texts of the period that initially inspired her and makes references to a number of other literary and cultural works and events. These give an impression of historical realism, even though Barker tends to refute the claim that the novel is "historical fiction".

In 1997, the novel was adapted by Scottish screenwriter Allan Scott into a film of the same name directed by Gillies MacKinnon and starring Jonathan Pryce as Rivers, James Wilby as Sassoon, and Jonny Lee Miller as Prior. The film was highly critically acclaimed and successful in the UK and Canada, receiving nominations for a number of awards, but failed to get the marketing and distribution in the US, so made little impact.

== The Eye in the Door ==
The Eye in the Door is a novel by Pat Barker, first published in 1993, and forming the second part of the Regeneration trilogy.

The Eye in the Door is set in London, beginning in mid-April 1918, and continues the interwoven stories of Dr William Rivers, Billy Prior, and Siegfried Sassoon begun in Regeneration. It ends some time before the conclusion of the First World War later the same year. The third part of the trilogy, The Ghost Road, continues the story.

Whereas Regeneration is an anomalous, but not unique, mixture of fact and fiction, The Eye in the Door acknowledges real events, including the campaign against homosexuals being waged that year by right-wing MP Noel Pemberton Billing, and the conviction of activist Alice Wheeldon for attempted assassination of Prime Minister David Lloyd George, here subsumed with the character named Beatrice Roper, but the whole remains consistently within the realm of fiction. This grants Barker more freedom to explore her characters and their actions, the descriptions of which might be considered libellous if attributed to real people. A major theme of the book, Prior's intense and indiscriminate bisexuality, is effectively contrasted with Rivers's tepid asexuality and Sassoon's pure homosexuality. Greater fictional scope also permits a deeper treatment of the psychological, political and professional life of the central character, Billy Prior.

== The Ghost Road ==
The Ghost Road is a war novel by Pat Barker, first published in 1995 and winner of the Booker Prize. It is the third volume of a trilogy that follows the fortunes of shell-shocked British army officers towards the end of the First World War. The other books in the trilogy are Regeneration and The Eye in the Door.

The war poet Siegfried Sassoon, who appears as a major character in the first book, Regeneration, is relegated to a minor role in this final volume, in which the main players are the fictional working-class officer Billy Prior and the real-life psychoanalyst William Rivers. Thus Barker explores possible relationships between real people and fictional characters.
