= Billy Prior =

Billy Prior is a fictional character in Pat Barker's Regeneration Trilogy of novels set during World War I.

== Overview ==
Prior, often called by his second name, is an intelligent, deeply cynical soldier whom we first meet recovering from shell shock at Craiglockhart. At the beginning of Regeneration he is temporarily mute, having found the detached eye of a dead comrade in the trenches, and mainly communicates through writing with pen and paper. However, he eventually overcomes this through counselling with Dr. W. H. R. Rivers, the historical psychologist who features prominently in all three novels. His relationship with Rivers is problematic and sometimes argumentative. During the trilogy they are at odds over class difference (Billy comes from working class origins), Prior's sardonic treatment of the hospital staff, and Rivers's own moral misgivings about the war. During Regeneration Prior commences a tentative romance with Sarah, a young munitions worker. In The Eye in the Door we discover that he is bisexual, as he has a dalliance with Captain Manning.

In the first novel of the series we learn that Prior was emotionally abused by his father, an abrasive wife-beater, an experience that also helped shape the man he would become.

== Literary significance and criticism ==
Nahem Yousaf and Sharon Monteith called Prior "the mobilizing force in the trilogy; not only does he experience the war in phases, his chameleonlike character also facilitates shifts in perspective."

== Film, TV or theatrical portraits ==
Jonny Lee Miller portrayed Prior in the 1997 film adaptation of Regeneration.
