= Black Sun, Red Moon =

2013 novel by Rory Marron

- Author: Rory Marron
- Language: English
- Genre: War novel
- Publisher: Seventh Citadel
- Publication date: 2013
- Publication place: United Kingdom
- Media type: Print (Paperback & ebook)
- Pages: 338 pp
- ISBN: 978-0957630529
- Followed by: Merdeka Rising

Black Sun, Red Moon is the first novel by British author Rory Marron. It is published in two parts, with the second part titled Merdeka Rising.

The novel is set in Java at the end of World War II preceding the Indonesian War of Independence. Japan is about to surrender and the Imperial officers stationed in Indonesia must make decisions about the Dutch colony they took over. Indonesian rebel leaders want Japan to grant their country independence before the Japanese surrender. Meanwhile, Dutch leaders expect British forces to help them recover their colony.
