= J. B. Salmond =

Scottish journalist, poet and novelist

James Bell Salmond (8 December 1891 – 2 February 1958), better known as J. B. Salmond, was a Scottish journalist, poet and novelist. During the First World War he wrote poetry and, with Wilfred Owen, was for a time joint editor of The Hydra, a journal published within Craiglockhart Military Hospital in Edinburgh.

He was born in Arbroath, the son of James Boath Salmond, a non-fiction writer, novelist and editor of the Arbroath Herald. Salmond senior died in 1901, aged only 41.

J. B. Salmond obtained a degree in Political Economy from the University of St Andrews in 1913. After working as a journalist with Northcliffe Press, he joined the Inns of Court Regiment, a territorial unit, at the beginning of the First World War, and was soon commissioned as a 2nd Lieutenant.

Salmond wrote many poems about his war experiences, some in Scottish dialect, but is less well-known for his poetry than many of his contemporaries. During his time in the Black Watch, as a junior officer, he was involved in both the Battle of the Somme and the Battle of Arras, following which, diagnosed with neurasthenia, he was consigned to Craiglockhart War Hospital. Salmond arrived at Craiglockhart on 25 June 1917, and Wilfred Owen on the following day.

As editor, Salmond made improvements to The Hydra, the in-house magazine produced by patients to which both Wilfred Owen and Siegfried Sassoon contributed. Salmond was discharged from Craiglockhart on 13 November 1917, about two weeks after Owen.

After the war, he resumed his career as a journalist, and married Peggy Chalmers in 1923. He later took on the editorship of The Scots Magazine, which had been in existence since 1739, and was revived in the 1920s by the St Andrew's Society of Glasgow, later moving to Dundee. Salmond became a prominent citizen of Dundee, and among other things was President of the local branch of the Royal Scottish Country Dance Society. He was also involved with the Scottish Youth Hostels Association, the Grampian Club, and the Abertay Historical Society, having settled at Newport-on-Tay.

During the Second World War, he was in the Home Guard. He gave up the editorship of the Scots Magazine in 1948 in order to become Keeper of Muniments and warden of St Salvator's Hall at the University of St Andrews.

== Works ==
=== Poetry ===
- The Old Stalker and Other Verses (The Moray Press, 1936)

=== Non-fiction ===
- Wade in Scotland (Edinburgh, 1938)
- The History of the 51st Highland Division 1939-1945 (1953)
- Recording Scotland (Pilgrim Trust, 1952)

=== Novels ===
- Bawbee Bowden (1922)
- Flower of the Flax (1944)
- The Toby Jug (1947)
