= Regeneration (1997 film) =

- Directed by: Gillies MacKinnon
- Screenplay by: Allan Scott
- Based on: Pat Barker (novel)
- Produced by: Allan Scott; Peter R. Simpson
- Starring: Jonathan Pryce; James Wilby; Jonny Lee Miller; Stuart Bunce; Tanya Allen; John Neville
- Cinematography: Glen MacPherson
- Edited by: Pia Di Ciaula
- Music by: Mychael Danna
- Distributed by: Artificial Eye (UK)
- Release date: 21 November 1997
- Running time: 114 minutes (United States 96 minutes)
- Countries: United Kingdom; Canada
- Language: English
- Box office: $225,519

Regeneration is a 1997 British film, directed by Gillies MacKinnon, an adaptation by Allan Scott of the 1991 novel of the same name by Pat Barker. Saskia Sutton, executive produced. It was released as Behind the Lines in the US in 1998.

The film follows the stories of a number of officers of the British Army during World War I who are taken to Craiglockhart War Hospital where they are treated for various mainly psychological traumas, including shell shock, using the then relatively novel fields of psycho-analysis and psychiatry under the supervision of Dr William Rivers. It brings together a number of noted War poets, featuring the story-line of Siegfried Sassoon in the main story — after his open letter reprinted in The Times condemning the conduct of the War — along with Wilfred Owen and Robert Graves and their return to the Western Front. Though the main characters and the main plot points are matters of fact, some characters, such as Billy Prior, and the story itself are fictional.

== Plot ==
The film starts with Siegfried Sassoon's open letter of July 1917, Finished with the War: A Soldier's Declaration, inveighing "against the political errors and insincerities for which the fighting men are being sacrificed". The letter published in The Times, receives much attention because Sassoon is considered a hero for acts of valour, having received the Military Cross, which later Sassoon throws away. With the influence of Robert Graves, a fellow poet and friend, the army sends Sassoon to Craiglockhart War Hospital, a psychiatric facility, rather than court-martialling him. There, Sassoon meets Dr William Rivers, a Freudian psychiatrist who encourages his patients to express their war memories as therapy.

The film follows the interweaving of several characters and their stories: Dr Rivers and his patients Siegfried Sassoon and Billy Prior. Wilfred Owen, appearing as a secondary character, is linked to Sassoon's story-line.

Prior presents a challenge to Rivers, who needs to discover what experience caused Prior to become mute. Prior surprisingly regains his speech and begins a relationship with Sarah, a munitions worker at a local factory. He has a strong sense of social class — one of the few working class soldiers admitted to officer training and then commissioned — setting himself apart from the other officers and referring to incidents that caused him to mistrust the authorities. During hypnotherapy, Prior realizes he was traumatized by the death of one of his men, killed by a bomb. Prior lost his speech after picking up the private's eyeball and asked what should be done with "this gobstopper". This surprises Prior who assumed his condition was caused by something for which he was responsible. He feels he has to return to active duty to prove to himself and others that he is as competent as before.

Sassoon becomes friends with another patient, Wilfred Owen. Owen aspires to be a poet and respects Sassoon's work; Sassoon agrees to help him with his poetry.

Meanwhile, Rivers has developed mental health problems himself due to dealing with his patients' trauma. He therefore takes a leave of absence to visit Lewis Yealland's medical practice in London. Yealland treats his patients —privates and non-commissioned officers — not like traumatised people, but as machines that need to be repaired quickly. Rivers sits in on experimental electric stimulation therapy sessions on a private, who has lost his speech, like Prior. The treatment involves using electric current applied to the oral cavity of a patient. Rivers is repulsed by the treatments' brutality and returns to Craiglockhart to continue producing what Sassoon calls his "gentle miracles", but at the cost of his own mental health; in contrast to Yealland, who lacks empathy, but is proud of his success in treating mutism.

Sassoon, although still disagreeing with the continuation of the War, decides to return to France to care for his men. During the Review Board's evaluation of Sassoon, Rivers is surprised by Sassoon's insistence that he has not changed his views. However, since Sassoon did not truly qualify as mentally ill and wished to return to the war, Rivers qualifies him as being fit. Sassoon is seen being injured and then laughing at escaping being killed, to his men's consternation. The extent of the injury is only resolved when Rivers reads a letter from him after the war.

In the meantime, Prior goes before the Board and is assigned to home duties, mostly due to asthma, which means he cannot be sure whether he is cured. He is last seen in bed with Sarah, being reassured.

The concluding scenes show Wilfred Owen's body in a French waterway in the final days of the War and Rivers's sadness on hearing of it. He is seen crying as he reads Owen's "The Parable of the Old Man and the Young" sent by Sassoon. The visual motif of a canal tunnel which has been Owen's dream is now resolved. Unlike other patients' dreams which are the visualisations of the traumatic events causing their breakdowns, Owen's is the premonition of his death.

== Cast ==
- Jonathan Pryce as Capt. William Rivers
- James Wilby as 2nd Lt. Siegfried Sassoon
- Jonny Lee Miller as 2nd Lt. Billy Prior
- Stuart Bunce as 2nd Lt. Wilfred Owen
- Tanya Allen as Sarah
- David Hayman as Maj. Bryce
- Dougray Scott as Capt. Robert Graves
- John Neville as Dr. Yealland

== Reception ==
Philip French in The Observer called it "a superb film" and praised the "quiet authority" of Mackinnon's directing style. A BBC reviewer praised Regeneration as "a film that achieves its power through understatement" and called Miller's performance "superb". Empire called it "a worthy, often engrossing tale, delicately acted and beautifully shot". The reviewer added that Wilby was "very good, bristling with upper class righteous indignation", Pryce was "on top form" and Miller "impressive". Time Out has called the film "subtle, elegant and sharply intelligent", and noted "marvellous performances all round". Hadley Freeman writing for Cherwell calls it a "genuinely powerful film, affecting and effective" and praises Miller's performance. Several reviewers referred to the convincing depiction of trench warfare.

In the years following, Karin E. Westman highlighted some necessary shortcomings of the film in its abbreviated adaptation, in relation to the book on which it is based. She remarks that the film's attention was drawn away in the way that ignored the question of Prior's ambiguous sexuality, which becomes clear in the second and third books of Barker's trilogy.

== Awards ==
During the 1997 BAFTA awards, Regeneration was nominated for the Alexander Korda Award for Best British Film but lost to Gary Oldman's Nil by Mouth. During the 1998 British Independent Film Awards, Jonathan Pryce was nominated for Best Performance by a British Actor in an Independent Film, Gillies MacKinnon was also nominated in the Best British Director of an Independent Film category. Because the film was a British-Canadian co-production, Regeneration received various nominations at the Canadian Genie Awards, including Best Achievement in Direction (Gillies MacKinnon), Best Motion Picture (Allan Scott, Peter Simpson), Best Music Score (Mychael Danna), Best Performance by an Actor in a Leading Role (Jonathan Pryce) and Best Screenplay (Allan Scott).
