= The Hydra =

The Hydra was a magazine produced by the patients of the Craiglockhart War Hospital, noteworthy for having been edited at one time by Wilfred Owen, and for including poems by Siegfried Sassoon. The magazine was headquartered in Edinburgh. Another editor was Black Watch officer James Bell Salmond, who went on to be editor of The Scots Magazine and was later the Keeper of Muniments at the University of St Andrews. In 1918 George Henry Bonner became the editor. The magazine ceased publication the same year.

The Hydra is mentioned in Pat Barker's novel Regeneration about the experiences of patients at Craiglockhart War Hospital during World War I.

The name was a reference to the hospital's pre-war role as a centre for hydrotherapy. All issues of the magazine were archived by Oxford University.
