= Another World (novel) =

1998 novel by Pat Barker

- First edition
- Author: Pat Barker
- Language: English
- Publisher: Viking Press
- Publication date: 29 Oct 1998
- Publication place: United Kingdom
- Pages: 277
- ISBN: 978-0-670-87058-5
- Preceded by: The Ghost Road
- Followed by: Border Crossing (novel)

Another World is a novel by Pat Barker, published in 1998. The novel concerns Geordie, a 101-year-old Somme veteran in the last days before his death. The main narrator is Geordie's grandson Nick, a schoolteacher who lives in Newcastle with his family.
