= War novel =

Literary genre

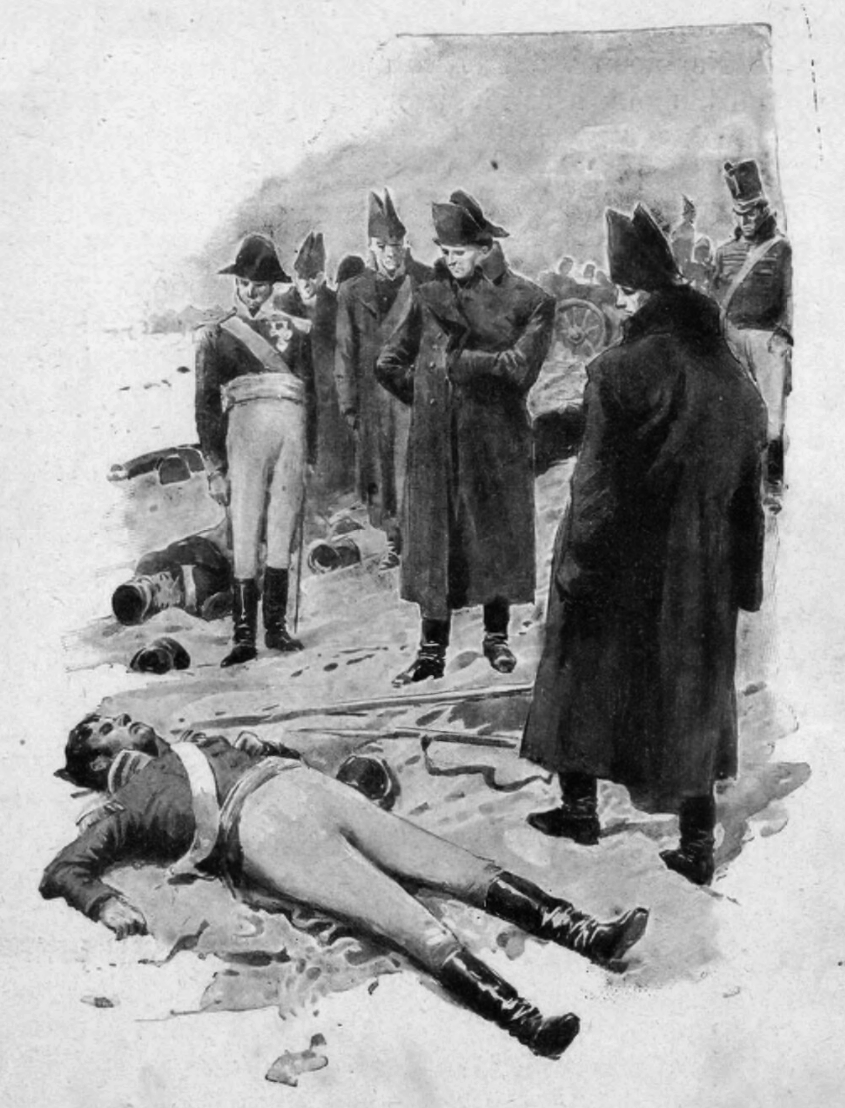
"That is a fine death", by Stanislav Hudeček; illustration to Leo Tolstoy's War and Peace, showing Napoleon gazing at dead soldiers after the Battle of Austerlitz

A war novel or military fiction is a novel about war. It is a novel in which the primary action takes place on a battlefield, or in a civilian setting (or home front), where the characters are preoccupied with the preparations for, suffering the effects of, or recovering from war. Many war novels are historical novels.

== Origins ==
The war novel's origins are in the epic poetry of the classical and medieval periods, especially Homer's The Iliad, Virgil's The Aeneid, sagas like the Old English Beowulf, and Arthurian literature. All of these epics were concerned with preserving the history or mythology of conflicts between different societies, while providing an accessible narrative that could reinforce a people's collective memory. Other important influences on the war novel included the tragedies of dramatists such as Euripides, Seneca the Younger, Christopher Marlowe, and Shakespeare. Euripides' The Trojan Women is a powerfully disturbing play on the theme of war's horrors, apparently critical of Athenian imperialism.

Shakespeare's Henry V, which focuses on events immediately before and after the Battle of Agincourt (1415) during the Hundred Years' War, provides a model for how the history, tactics, and ethics of war could be combined in an essentially fictional framework. Romances and satires in Early Modern Europe, like Edmund Spenser's epic poem The Faerie Queene and Miguel de Cervantes's novel Don Quixote, to name but two, also contain elements that influenced the later development of war novels. In terms of imagery and symbolism, many modern war novels (especially those espousing an anti-war viewpoint) are influenced by Dante's depiction of Hell in the Inferno, John Milton's account of the war in Heaven in Paradise Lost, and the Apocalypse as depicted in the biblical Book of Revelation. A notable non-western example of war novel is Luo Guanzhong's Romance of the Three Kingdoms.

As the realistic form of the novel rose to prominence in the seventeenth century, the war novel began to develop its modern form, although most novels featuring war were picaresque satires rather than truly realistic portraits of war. An example of one such work is Hans Jakob Christoffel von Grimmelshausen's Simplicius Simplicissimus, a semi-autobiographical account of the Thirty Years' War.

== 19th century war novels ==
The war novel came of age during the nineteenth century, with works like Stendhal's The Charterhouse of Parma (1839), which features the Battle of Waterloo, Leo Tolstoy's War and Peace (1869), about the Napoleonic Wars in Russia, and Stephen Crane's The Red Badge of Courage (1895), which deals with the American Civil War. All of these works feature realistic depictions of major battles, scenes of wartime horror and atrocities, and significant insights into the nature of heroism and cowardice, as well as the exploration of moral questions.

== World War I ==
World War I produced an unprecedented number of war novels, by writers from countries on all sides of the conflict. One of the first and most influential of these was the 1916 novel Le Feu (or Under Fire) by the French novelist and soldier Henri Barbusse. Barbusse's novel, with its open criticism of nationalist dogma and military incompetence, initiated the anti-war movement in literature that flourished after the war.

Of equal significance is the autobiographical work of Ernst Jünger, In Stahlgewittern (1920) (Storm of Steel). Distinctly different from novels like Barbusse's and later Erich Maria Remarque's Im Westen nichts Neues (All Quiet on the Western Front), Jünger instead writes of the war as a valiant hero who embraced combat and brotherhood in spite of the horror. The work not only provides for an under-represented perspective of the War, but it also gives insight into the German sentiment that they were never actually defeated in the First World War.

The post-1918 period produced a vast range of war novels, including such "home front" novels as Rebecca West's The Return of the Soldier (1918), about a shell shocked soldier's difficult re-integration into British society; Romain Rolland's Clérambault (1920), about a grieving father's enraged protest against French militarism; and John Dos Passos's Three Soldiers (1921), one of a relatively small number of American novels about the First World War. Also in the post–World War I period, the subject of war is dealt with in an increasing number of modernist novels, many of which were not "war novels" in the conventional sense, but which featured characters whose psychological trauma and alienation from society stemmed directly from wartime experiences. One example of this type of novel is Virginia Woolf's Mrs. Dalloway (1925)', in which a key subplot concerns the tortuous descent of a young veteran, Septimus Warren Smith, toward insanity and suicide. In 1924, Laurence Stallings published his autobiographical war novel, Plumes.

The 1920s saw the so-called "war book boom," during which many men who had fought during the war were finally ready to write openly and critically about their war experiences. In 1929, Erich Maria Remarque's Im Westen nichts Neues (All Quiet on the Western Front) was a massive, worldwide bestseller, not least for its brutally realistic account of the horrors of trench warfare from the perspective of a German infantryman. Less well known but equally shocking in its account of the horrors of trench warfare is the earlier Stratis Myrivilis' Greek novel Life in the Tomb, which was first published in serialised form in the weekly newspaper Kambana (April 1923 – January 1924), and then in revised and much expanded form in 1930. Also significant were Emilio Lussu's Sardinian Brigade (1938), Curzio Malaparte's Viva Caporetto!/La leggenda dei santi maledetti (1920), Arnold Zweig's Der Streit um den Sergeanten Grischa (1927) (The Case of Sergeant Grischa), Ernest Hemingway's A Farewell to Arms (1929), Richard Aldington's Death of a Hero (1929), Charles Yale Harrison's Generals Die in Bed (1930), William March's Company K (1933), and Humphrey Cobb's Paths of Glory (1935).

Novels about World War I appeared less in the 1930s, though during this decade historical novels about earlier wars became popular. Margaret Mitchell's Gone with the Wind (1936), which recalls the American Civil War, is an example of works of this trend. William Faulkner's The Unvanquished (1938) is his only novel that focuses on the Civil War years, but he deals with the subject of the long, aftermath of it in works like The Sound and the Fury (1929) and Absalom, Absalom! (1936).

The 1990s and early 21st century saw another resurgence of novels about the First World War, with Pat Barker's Regeneration Trilogy: Regeneration (1991), The Eye in the Door (1993), and The Ghost Road (1995), and Birdsong (1993) by English writer Sebastian Faulks, and more recently Three to a Loaf (2008) by Canadian Michael Goodspeed.

== World War II ==
World War II gave rise to a new boom in contemporary war novels. Unlike World War I novels, a European-dominated genre, World War II novels were produced in the greatest numbers by American writers, who made war in the air, on the sea, and in key theatres such as the Pacific Ocean and Asia integral to the war novel. Among the most successful American war novels were Herman Wouk's The Caine Mutiny, James Jones's From Here to Eternity, and Hemingway's For Whom the Bell Tolls, the latter a novel set in the Spanish Civil War.

Jean-Paul Sartre's novel Troubled Sleep (1949) (originally translated as Iron in the Soul), the third part in the trilogy Les chemins de la liberté, The Roads to Freedom, "depicts the fall of France in 1940, and the anguished feelings of a group of Frenchmen whose pre-war apathy gives way to a consciousness of the dignity of individual resistance - to the German occupation and to fate in general - and solidarity with people similarly oppressed." The previous volume Le sursis (1945, The Reprieve, explores the ramifications of the appeasement pact that Great Britain and France signed with Nazi Germany in 1938. Another significant French war novel was Pierre Boulle's Le Pont de la rivière Kwaï (1952) (The Bridge over the River Kwai). He served as a secret agent under the name Peter John Rule and helped the resistance movement in China, Burma and French Indochina. War is a constant and central theme of Claude Simon (1913 – 2005), the French novelist and the 1985 Nobel Laureate in Literature: "It is present in one form or another in almost all of Simon's published works, "Simon often contrasts various individuals' experiences of different historical conflicts in a single novel; World War I and the Second World War in L'Acacia (which also takes into account the impact of war on the widows of soldiers); the French Revolutionary Wars and the Second World War in Les Géorgiques." He served in the cavalry in 1940 and even took part in an attack on horseback against tanks. "The finest of all those novels is the one in which his own brief experience of warfare is used to tremendous effect: La Route Des Flandres (The Flanders Road, 1960) [...] There, war becomes a metaphor all too suitable for the human condition in general, as the forms and protocols of the social order dissolve into murderous chaos.'" French philosopher and novelist,

The bombing of London in 1940-1 is the subject of three British novels published in 1943; Graham Greene's The Ministry of Fear, James Hanley's No Direction, and Henry Green's Caught. Greene's later The End of the Affair (1951) is set mainly during the flying bomb raids on London of 1944. According to Bernard Bergonzi "[d]uring the war the preferred form of new fiction for new fiction writers [in Britain] was the short story". Although John Cowper Powys's historical novel Owen Glendower is set in the fifteenth century historical parallels exist between the beginning of the fifteenth century and the late 1930s and early 1940s: "A sense of contemporataneousness is ever present in Owen Glendower. We are in a world of change like our own". The novel was conceived at a time when the "Spanish Civil War (Note: On the April 26, 1937, two days after Powys began his novel, the Spanish town of Guernica, was bombed by the Nazi Germany's Luftwaffe. It inspired the painting Guernica by Pablo Picasso.) was a major topic of public debate" and completed on 24 December 1939, a few months after World War II had begun. In the "Argument" that prefaced the (American) first edition of 1941, Powys comments "the beginning of the fifteenth century [...] saw the beginning of one of the most momentous and startling epochs of transition that the world has known". This was written in May 1940, and "[t]here can be no doubt" that readers of the novel would have "registered the connection between the actions of the book and the events of their own world".

Fair Stood the Wind for France is a 1944 novel by H. E. Bates, which is concerned with a pilot of a Wellington bomber, who badly injures his arm when he brings his plane down in German-occupied France at the height of the Second World War. Eventually he and his crew make the hazardous journey back to Britain by rowing boat, bicycle and train. Bates was commissioned into the Royal Air Force (RAF) solely to write short stories, because the Air Ministry realised that the populace was less concerned with facts and figures about the war, than it was with reading about those who were fighting it.

British novelist Evelyn Waugh's Put Out More Flags (1942) is set during the "Phoney War", following the wartime activities of characters introduced in his earlier satirical novels, and Finnish novelist Väinö Linna's The Unknown Soldier (1954) set during the Continuation War between Finland and the Soviet Union telling the viewpoint of ordinary Finnish soldiers. Waugh's Sword of Honour trilogy, Men at Arms (1952), Officers and Gentlemen (1955) and Unconditional Surrender (1961) (published as The End of the Battle in the US), loosely parallel Waugh's experiences in the Second World War. Waugh received the 1952 James Tait Black Memorial Prize for Men at Arms.

Elizabeth Bowen's The Heat of the Day (1948) is another war novel. However, even though events occur mainly during World War II, the violence of war is usually absent from the narration: "two years after the Blitz, Londoners, no longer traumatised by nightly raids, were growing acclimatised to ruin." Rather than a period of material destruction, war functions instead as a circumstance that alters normality in people's lives. Stella confesses to Robert: "'we are friends of circumstance⎯war, this isolation, this atmosphere in which everything goes on and nothing's said." There are, however, some isolated passages that deal with the bombings of London:

More experimental and unconventional American works in the post-war period included Joseph Heller's satirical Catch-22 and Thomas Pynchon's Gravity's Rainbow, an early example of postmodernism. Norman Mailer's The Naked and the Dead, Irwin Shaw's The Young Lions, and James Jones' The Thin Red Line, all explore the personal nature of war within the context of intense combat.

The English Patient is a 1992 Booker Prize-winning novel by Canadian novelist Michael Ondaatje. The book follows four dissimilar people brought together at an Italian villa during the Italian Campaign of World War II. The four main characters are: an unrecognisably burned man—the titular patient, presumed to be English; his Canadian Army nurse, a Sikh British Army sapper, and a Canadian thief. The story occurs during the North African Campaign and is about the incremental revelations of the patient's actions prior to his injuries and the emotional effects of these revelations on the other characters.

The decades following World War II period also saw the rise of other types of war novel. One is the Holocaust novel, of which Canadian A.M. Klein's The Second Scroll, Italian Primo Levi's If This Is a Man and If Not Now, When?, and American William Styron's Sophie's Choice are key examples. Another is the novel of internment or persecution (other than in the Holocaust), in which characters find themselves imprisoned or deprived of their civil rights as a direct result of war. An example is Joy Kogawa's Obasan, which is about Canada's deportation and internment of its citizens of Japanese descent during World War II. Similarly, the life story of a Ukrainian boy who is at first interned in a labour camp and then drafted to fight for Russia is depicted in UKRAINE - In the Time of War, by Sonia Campbell-Gillies. J.G. Ballard's "Empire of the Sun" recounts the story of a boy who lives with his parents in Shanghai, but is interned by Japanese forces after the Japanese attack on Pearl Harbor. The child matter-of-factly describes the increasing violence and horror he witnesses as the war progresses. Black Rain (1965) by Masuji Ibuse is a novel based on the atomic bombing of Hiroshima. The Sea and Poison (1957) by Shusaku Endo is about Japanese medical experimentation on an American POW.

== Korean war ==
Almost immediately following World War II was the Korean War (1950–1953). The American novelist's Richard Hooker's MASH: A Novel About Three Army Doctors is a black comedy set in Korea during the war; it was made into a movie and a successful television series. In his "A World Turned Colder: A Very Brief Assessment of Korean War Literature", Pinaki Roy attempted in 2013 to provide a critical overview of the different publications, principally novels, published on the war.

== Vietnam and later wars ==
After World War II, the war that has attracted the greatest number of novelists is the Vietnam War. Graham Greene's The Quiet American was the first novel to explore the origins of the Vietnam war in the French colonial atmosphere of the 1950s. Tim O'Brien's The Things They Carried is a cycle of Vietnam vignettes that reads like a novel. The Sorrow of War by Bao Ninh is a poignant account of the war from the Vietnamese perspective. (Note: For a critical overview of the different Vietnam War novels written or translated into English, see Pinaki Roy's "The Minds at War: Sensibilities in Select Vietnam War Novels", published in The Atlantic Literary Review Quarterly International (Vol. 9, No. 4, October–December 2008, pp. 121–37, ISBN 978-81-269-1091-5; ISSN 0972-3269).) In the wake of postmodernism and the absence of wars equalling the magnitude of the two world wars, the majority of war novelists have concentrated on how memory and the ambiguities of time affect the meaning and experience of war. In her Regeneration Trilogy, British novelist Pat Barker reimagines World War I from a contemporary perspective. Ian McEwan's novels Black Dogs and Atonement take a similarly retrospective approach to World War II, including such events as the British retreat from Dunkirk in 1940 and the Nazi invasion of France. The work of W. G. Sebald, most notably Austerlitz, is a postmodern inquiry into Germany's struggle to come to terms with its troubled past.

Some contemporary novels emphasize action and intrigue above thematic depth. Tom Clancy's The Hunt for Red October is a technically detailed account of submarine espionage during the Cold War, and many of John le Carré's spy novels are basically war novels for an age in which bureaucracy often replaces open combat. Another adaptation is the apocalyptic Christian novel, which focuses on the final showdown between universal forces of good and evil. Tim LaHaye is the author most readily associated with this genre. Many fantasy novels, too, use the traditional war novel as a departure point for depictions of fictional wars in imaginary realms.

Iran–Iraq War was also an interesting case for novelists. Events and memoirs of Iran–Iraq War has led to unique war novels. Noureddin, Son of Iran and One Woman's War: Da (Mother) are among the many novels which reminds the horrible situation of war. Many of these novels are based on the interviews performed with participants and their memoirs.

The post 9/11 literary world has produced few war novels that address current events in the war on terrorism. One example is Chris Cleave's Incendiary (2005), which made headlines after its publication, for appearing to anticipate the 7 July 2005 London bombings.

== See also ==
- Epic poetry
- War poet
- Nautical fiction
- Historical fiction
- The Holocaust in popular culture
- List of books with anti-war themes
- Category:War novels
