= A Poetics of Postmodernism =

1988 Nonfiction book by Linda Hutcheon

A Poetics of Postmodernism: History, Theory, Fiction
- 1988 Book jacket
- Author: Linda Hutcheon
- Subject: Postmodern theory, literature and culture
- Genre: Criticism, interpretation
- Published: 1988
- Publisher: Routledge
- Media type: Print, E-book
- Pages: 288
- ISBN: 9780415007054 9780415007061
- OCLC: 17107876
- LC Class: The Politics of Postmodernism
- Website: Official website

A Poetics of Postmodernism: History, Theory, Fiction is a monograph written by Linda Hutcheon. It was first published in 1988 by Taylor & Francis.

== Synopsis ==
Hutcheon opens her preface with an epigraph from Andreas Huyssen which says, "What will no longer do is either to eulogize or to ridicule postmodernism en bloc. The postmodern must be salvaged from its champions and from its detractors... " According to Chris Luebbe, reviewing the work for the journal Modern Language Notes (or MLN) this epigraph succinctly describes Hutcheon's efforts in the production of this work and that Hutcheson succeeds. The similarities and differences between this work and Fredric Jameson's earlier Postmodernism, or, the Cultural Logic of Late Capitalism have been discussed by scholars.

== Reception ==
According to Chris Luebbe writing for Modern Litarary Notes, "the issues and problems raised in Hutcheon's book are of great importance for an understanding of contemporary (postmodern) society and culture in all of their manifestations. If no answers are forthcoming in this work, at least "the questions that will make any answering process even possible are ... starting to be asked...'"
