= The Ghost Road =

1995 historical novel by Pat Barker

- First edition
- Author: Pat Barker
- Language: English
- Series: Regeneration Trilogy
- Genre: War novel
- Publisher: Viking Press
- Publication date: 1995
- Publication place: Britain
- Media type: Print (Hardback & Paperback)
- Pages: 288 (paperback)
- Preceded by: The Eye in the Door
- Followed by: Another World

The Ghost Road is a war novel by English writer Pat Barker, first published in 1995 and winner of the Booker Prize. It is the third volume of a trilogy that follows the fortunes of shell-shocked British army officers towards the end of the First World War. The other books in the trilogy are Regeneration and The Eye in the Door.

The war poet Siegfried Sassoon, who appears as a major character in the first book, Regeneration, is relegated to a minor role in this final volume, in which the main players are the fictional working-class officer Billy Prior and the real-life psychoanalyst William Rivers. Thus Barker explores possible relationships between real people and fictional characters.

== Plot summary ==
Prior, despite his new-found peace of mind and engagement to munitions worker Sarah, has been affected by the war and therefore does not have a lot of concern for his safety. Prior has been cured of shell-shock and is preparing to return to France. Prior experiences numerous and risky sexual encounters; his only rule is that he never pays for sex – a rule he eventually breaks.

Rivers, concerned for Prior's safety, finally recognises that his relationship with Prior, and his other patients for that matter, is deeply paternal. In contrast with upper-class officers like Sassoon, with whom Rivers has been able to form warm friendships, he has always found Prior to be a thorn in his side. As Prior returns to the front, Rivers continues to take care of his patients and his invalid sister; amid this, he reminisces uncomfortably about his childhood and memories of his experience ten years earlier on an anthropological expedition to Simbo (then called Eddystone Island) in the Solomon Islands in Melanesia. There, he befriended Njiru, the local priest-healer who took Rivers on his rounds to see sick villagers and also to the island's sacred Place of the Skulls. With him on the expedition was Arthur Maurice Hocart.

This episode is a symbolic capitulation to the inevitability of Prior's death at the Western Front, a fate he shares with the poet Wilfred Owen. In a futile battle that takes place a few days before the Armistice, Billy and his friend Owen are killed.

== Themes ==
War is a theme that is both overt and hidden. Although the most obvious theme is war between nations, The Ghost Road also details war between individuals and war within oneself. The book is written against a background of the end of World War I in 1918, but it is also filled with flashbacks to a pre-World War I time on a South Pacific island. While the Melanesian island of Eddystone isn't caught up in the world's woes, it constantly fights for its own existence.
