= Jonny Lee Miller =

British actor (born 1972)

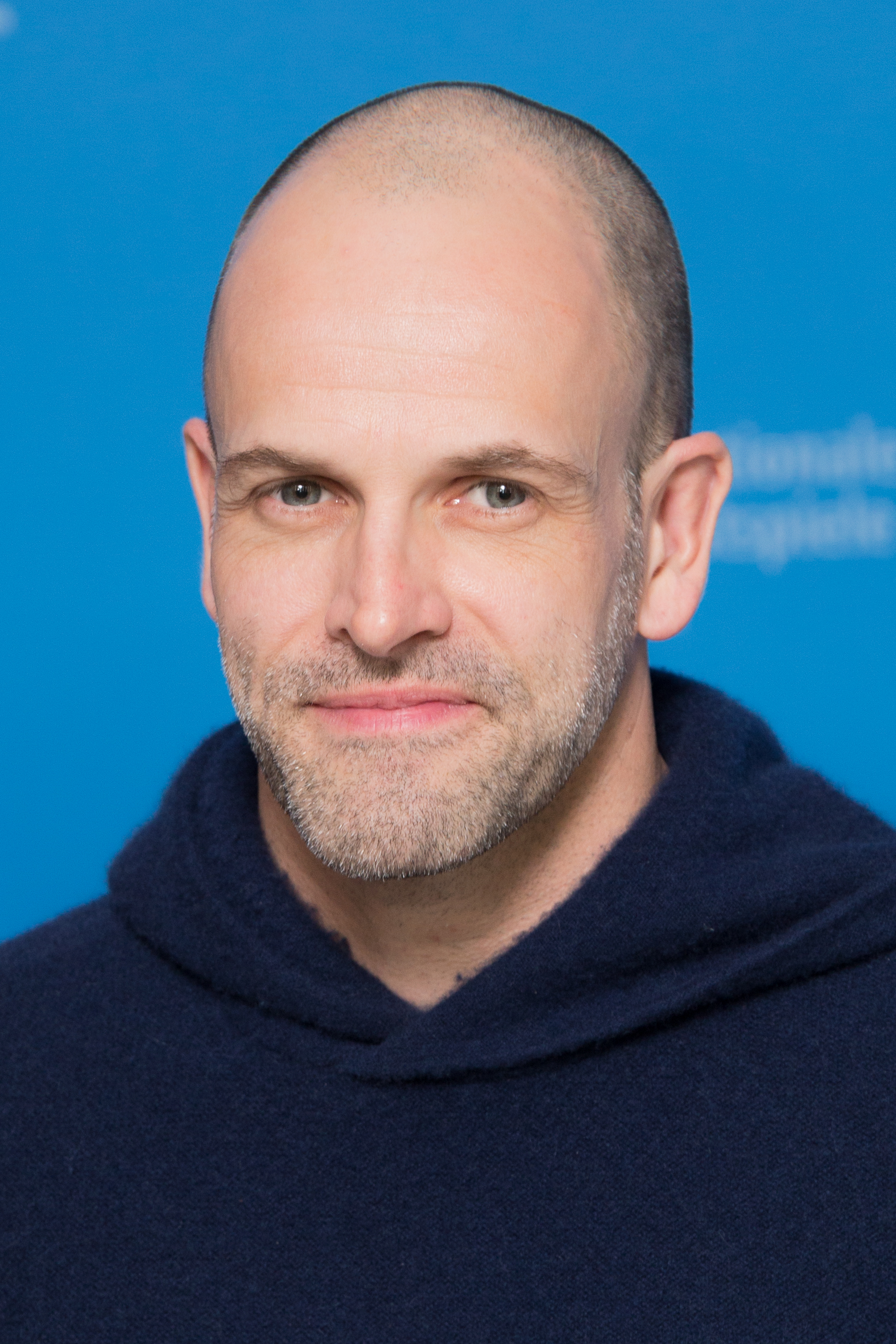
- Miller in 2017
- Born: Jonathan Lee Miller; 15 November 1972 (age 53); London, England
- Citizenship: United Kingdom; United States
- Occupation: Actor
- Years active: 1982–present
- Spouses: Angelina Jolie (m. 1996; div. 2000); Michele Hicks (m. 2008; div. 2018)
- Children: 1
- Relatives: Bernard Lee (grandfather)

Jonathan Lee Miller (born 15 November 1972) is an English actor. He achieved early success for his portrayal of Simon "Sick Boy" Williamson in the dark comedy-drama film Trainspotting (1996) and as Dade Murphy in Hackers (1995), then earning further critical recognition for his performances in Afterglow (1997), Mansfield Park (1999), Mindhunters (2004), The Flying Scotsman (2006), Endgame (2009), and T2 Trainspotting (2017). For The Flying Scotsman he received a London Film Critics' Circle nomination for Actor of the Year. He was also part of the principal cast in the films Melinda and Melinda (2004), Dark Shadows (2012), and Byzantium (2013). He has appeared in several theatrical productions, most notably After Miss Julie and Frankenstein, the latter of which earned him an Olivier Award for Best Actor.

Miller starred as the title character in the ABC comedy drama Eli Stone, for which he received a Satellite Award nomination for Best Actor. This was followed by another starring role in the BBC costume drama Emma and a supporting role as Jordan Chase in the fifth season of the Showtime drama Dexter. From 2012 to 2019, he starred as a modern-day version of Sherlock Holmes in the CBS crime drama Elementary, which earned him his second Satellite Award nomination for Best Actor. In 2022, he played British prime minister John Major in the fifth season of the Netflix historical drama The Crown.

== Early life ==
Miller was born on 15 November 1972, in Kingston-upon-Thames, Greater London and was raised in south-west London. The son of Ann (née Lee) and Alan Miller, he was inspired by his parents to go into acting. Both were theatre actors. His maternal grandfather was actor Bernard Lee, who played M in the first eleven James Bond films.

Miller attended Tiffin School as a child. He appeared in several school plays such as The Ragged Child and performed as part of the Tiffin Swing Band. He joined the National Youth Music Theatre, where he met fellow actor Jude Law. He left school, aged 16, after taking his GCSEs, to pursue an acting career.

== Career ==
=== 1982–present: television ===
Miller made his television debut with an uncredited appearance in the BBC series Doctor Who at the age of nine in the 1982 episode Kinda. The following year he appeared in Jemima Shore and had a role as Charles Price in the serial drama Mansfield Park. In 1991, he co-starred with Alexei Sayle in 'Itch, which was broadcast on Channel 4 as part of the 4 Play strand, a platform for a series of one-off plays that ran from 1989 to 1991. The play was written by Alexei Sayle and David Stafford. Miller played Dennis Turnbull, the teenaged son of Gordon and Susan Turnbull. He then appeared in various television shows throughout the 1990s. These included Keeping Up Appearances in 1990, followed by Inspector Morse and Minder in 1991. He appeared in two separate guest roles in the ITV police drama The Bill, one in 1991 and another in 1993, as well as single-episode roles in the BBC drama Between the Lines and the medical drama Casualty, both of which were broadcast in 1992.

In 1993's third installment of Prime Suspect, Miller played a young man who had been victimised as a child by a paedophile. His first notable acting role that year was in the soap opera EastEnders, wherein he played Jonathan Hewitt. Miller later revealed he had been offered a contract to remain on the show but declined: "It was five weeks' work and I made more money there than I ever had in my life. Then they offered me a year's contract. I said no, thank God. I thought I should get out of there while I still could."

In 2003, Miller appeared in the BBC modernisation of The Canterbury Tales in the episode The Pardoner's Tale and had a starring role as Lord Byron in the television film Byron. He then starred alongside Ray Liotta in the CBS drama Smith. However, the show was cancelled after only seven episodes. Miller was then cast as the title character in the legal comedy drama Eli Stone. The show ran for two seasons on ABC and he received a Satellite Award nomination for Best Actor. He then co-starred with Romola Garai in the 2009 BBC costume drama Emma as George Knightley.

Miller appeared in a guest role as Jordan Chase in the fifth season of the Showtime drama Dexter, for which he received a nomination for Screen Actors Guild Award for being part of the main cast in the category of Outstanding Performance by an Ensemble in a Drama Series. In early 2010, it was reported he was set to portray Rick Grimes in the television adaptation of the comic The Walking Dead. It was later revealed that Andrew Lincoln had been cast. In 2011, Miller auditioned for the role of Sherlock Holmes in the CBS adaptation based on the works of Arthur Conan Doyle. He originally turned down the part, as he feared it would be too similar to the BBC version Sherlock. However, after reviewing the script he accepted the part, and it was officially announced he would star in Elementary, alongside Lucy Liu. This earned him his second Satellite Award nomination for Best Actor.

In 2021, it was announced that he was to star in season five of The Crown, as former British Prime Minister John Major.

=== 1995–present: film ===
He first starred in the film Hackers (1995), with Angelina Jolie, whom he married in 1996. Shortly after Hackers, Miller was cast as Sick Boy in Trainspotting. He was suggested for the role by Ewan McGregor. The accent he used in the film was regarded as convincing, leading some people to incorrectly believe that he was Scottish. Miller has stated: "I had to do a lot of work. I read and re-read the book and I pretended to be Scottish all the time I was in Glasgow, hanging around with Scots, picking up bits and pieces on the street and in bars. Everyone's been very encouraging and Danny [Boyle, the director] thinks that I've got it about right. Of course, the others are from all over Scotland and have different accents themselves, so I've tried to just pick up a general, composite accent."

In 1997, he played Billy Prior in the film adaptation of Pat Barker's World War I novel Regeneration. In 2000, he played Cameron Colley in Complicity, based on the book by Iain Banks. He co-starred in the film Love, Honour and Obey as Johnny, a London street kid getting mixed up with a notorious British gangster. Also in 2000, he appeared as Simon Sheppard in Wes Craven's Dracula 2000. In 2006 Miller portrayed cyclist Graeme Obree in The Flying Scotsman.

He was considered as the third teammate to join Ben Fogle and James Cracknell in Team QinetiQ for the Amundsen Omega 3 South Pole Race in January 2009. He participated in training for the event in Norway, which was televised for a BBC2 documentary series On Thin Ice. He was not able to attend the race because of filming commitments, after Eli Stone was extended for a second season.

In 1997, he was involved with the creation and operation of the production company Natural Nylon with friend Jude Law. The company folded in 2003.

=== 1999–present: theatre ===
In November 1999, he played Brito in Paul Corcoran's Four Nights in Knaresborough at the Tricycle Theatre, London. In March 2011, at the Royal National Theatre, he played both Victor Frankenstein and Frankenstein's Monster on alternate nights, opposite Benedict Cumberbatch, in a stage adaptation of Frankenstein. Directed by Danny Boyle, the play was broadcast to cinemas worldwide as part of National Theatre Live on 17 March 2011 and additional dates throughout March and April. He also appeared on Broadway in a production of After Miss Julie, with his performance receiving very positive reviews. In March 2004, he played Christian in Festen by David Eldridge at The Almeida Theatre in London.

=== Awards and honours ===
- Laurence Olivier Award (2012)
- Satellite Award (2008, 2012)
- IQ Award (2014) Miller was nominated for his portrayal of Sherlock Holmes, and he ultimately won the award.

== Personal life ==
Miller married Hackers co-star Angelina Jolie on 28 March 1996. Jude Law served as the best man. They separated in September 1997 and divorced in 1999. He began dating Michele Hicks in 2006. They married in July 2008 in Malibu, California. The couple has one son, Buster Timothy Miller, born in December 2008. They divorced in 2018.

Miller is a marathon runner, often supporting the charity Mencap. He was signed up to run the 2006 Marathon des Sables but dropped out due to filming commitments. He ran the 2008 London Marathon in 3:01:40. Miller is an advocate for finding treatment and cure for Sanfilippo syndrome. In 2014, he addressed the Congressional caucus in Washington, D.C., on behalf of rare disease organisations, in the hope of securing funding for treatment research.

In November 2014, he became an American citizen. He is qualified as a volunteer firefighter in New York.

=== Muay Thai ===
Miller has trained in both Muay Thai and Brazilian jiu-jitsu at Evolution Muay Thai in New York City. In May 2018, he took part in an exhibition Muay Thai bout held at Chok Sabai Gym in New York City, which followed a five-week training camp leading up to the event.

On 1 February 2019, Miller made his Muay Thai debut at Broad Street Ballroom in New York City. He won the fight by knockout in the final round.

==== Kickboxing record ====
Kickboxing record
1 Win, 0 Losses, 0 Draw, 1 KO, 1 NC
Date	Result	Opponent	Event	Location	Method	Round	Time
2019-02-01	Win	(United States) Robert Bermudez	Friday Night Fights	Broad Street Ballroom, New York City, NY	KO (Punches)	3	

Legend: Win Loss Draw/No contest Notes

== Filmography ==
=== Film ===
Year	Title	Role	Notes
1995	Hackers	Dade Murphy [aka "Zero Cool" / "Crash Override"]	
1996	Trainspotting	Simon "Sick Boy" Williamson	
1997	Afterglow	Jeffrey Byron	
1997	Regeneration	2nd Lt. Billy Prior	
1999	Plunkett & Macleane	Macleane	
1999	Mansfield Park	Edmund Bertram	
2000	Love, Honour and Obey	Jonny	
2000	Complicity	Cameron Colley	
2000	Dracula 2000	Simon Sheppard	
2002	The Escapist	Denis Hopkins	
2004	Mindhunters	Lucas Harper	
2004	Melinda and Melinda	Lee	
2005	Æon Flux	Oren Goodchild	
2006	The Flying Scotsman	Graeme Obree	
2009	Endgame	Michael Young	
2012	Dark Shadows	Roger Collins	
2012	Byzantium	The Captain	
2017	T2 Trainspotting	Simon "Sick Boy" Williamson	
2020	Funny Face	Developer	
2021	Settlers	Reza	
2022	Alice	Paul Bennet	
2023	The Covenant	Colonel Vokes	
2026	The Uprising †		Post-production
TBA	Viva La Madness †		Post-production

=== Television ===
Year	Title	Role	Notes
1982	Doctor Who	Kinda child (uncredited)	Episode: "Kinda: Part One"
1983	Jemima Shore Investigates	Boy with dog	Episode: "A Little Bit of Wildlife"
1983	Mansfield Park	Charles Price	2 episodes
1990	Keeping Up Appearances	The Youth	Episode: "Daisy's Toyboy"
1991	4 Play	Dennis Turnbull	Episode: "Itch"
1991	Inspector Morse	Student	Episode: "Greeks Bearing Gifts"
1991	Minder	Auctioneer's assistant	Episode: "Three Cons Make a Mountain"
1991-1993	The Bill	Simon Cooper/Lee Gibson	2 episodes
1992	EastEnders	Jonathan Hewitt	6 episodes
1992	Between the Lines	David Ringwood	Episode: "The Only Good Copper"
1992	Casualty	Matt	Episode: "Tender Loving Care"
1992	Second Thoughts	Chas	Episode: "Short Change"
1992	Goodbye Cruel World	Mark	Miniseries
1993	Prime Suspect 3	Anthony Field	Episode: "Part II"
1994	Cadfael	Edwin Gurney	Episode: "Monk's Hood"
1996	Dead Man's Walk	Woodrow Call	3 episodes
1999	Operation Good Guys	Himself	Episode: "Stardust"
2003	The Canterbury Tales	Arty	Episode: "The Pardoner's Tale"
2003	Byron	Lord Byron	2 episodes
2006–2007	Smith	Tom	7 episodes
2008–2009	Eli Stone	Eli Stone	26 episodes
2009	Emma	Mr. Knightley	4 episodes
2010	Dexter	Jordan Chase	6 episodes
2012–2019	Elementary	Sherlock Holmes	Main role, 154 episodes, also director of 3 episodes
2022	The Crown	John Major	Main role (season 5)
2026	Possession	Oliver Connaught	Main role

=== Stage ===
Year	Title	Role	Notes
1993	Beautiful Thing	Ste	Bush Theatre
1999	Four Knights in Knaresborough	Brito	Tricycle Theatre
2004	Festen	Christian	Almeida Theatre
2005	Someone Who'll Watch Over Me	Adam	Ambassadors Theatre
2009	After Miss Julie	John	American Airlines Theatre
2011	Frankenstein	Victor Frankenstein; Frankenstein's monster	Royal National Theatre
2019	Ink	Larry Lamb	Manhattan Theatre Club
2023	A Mirror	Čelik	Almeida Theatre
2024	A Mirror	Čelik	Trafalgar Theatre

== Awards and nominations ==
Year	Award	Category	Nominated work	Result
2007	BAFTA Award	Best Actor in a Scottish Film	The Flying Scotsman	Nominated
2007	London Film Critics Circle Award	Best British Actor of the Year	The Flying Scotsman	Nominated
2008	Satellite Award	Best Actor – Television Series Musical or Comedy	Eli Stone	Nominated
2010	Screen Actors Guild Award	Outstanding Performance by an Ensemble in a Drama Series	Dexter	Nominated
2012	Olivier Award	Best Actor in a Play	Frankenstein	Won
2012	Satellite Award	Best Actor – Television Series Drama	Elementary	Nominated
2012	Teen Choice Award	Choice TV Actor – Action	Elementary	Nominated

== See also ==
- List of actors who have played Sherlock Holmes
- List of British actors
- List of people from Kingston upon Thames
