= The Eye in the Door =

1993 historical novel by Pat Barker

- First edition
- Author: Pat Barker
- Language: English
- Series: Regeneration Trilogy
- Genre: War novel
- Publisher: Viking Press
- Publication date: 1993
- Publication place: United Kingdom
- Media type: Print (Hardback & Paperback)
- Preceded by: Regeneration
- Followed by: The Ghost Road

The Eye in the Door is a novel by Pat Barker, first published in 1993, and forming the second part of the Regeneration trilogy.

The Eye in the Door is set in London, beginning in mid-April 1918, and continues the interwoven stories of Dr William Rivers, Billy Prior, and Siegfried Sassoon begun in Regeneration. It ends some time before the conclusion of the First World War later the same year. The third part of the trilogy, The Ghost Road, continues the story.

Whereas Regeneration is an anomalous, but not unique, mixture of fact and fiction, The Eye in the Door acknowledges real events, including the campaign against homosexuals being waged that year by right-wing MP Noel Pemberton Billing, and the conviction of activist Alice Wheeldon for attempted assassination of Prime Minister David Lloyd George, here subsumed with the character named Beatrice Roper, but the whole remains consistently within the realm of fiction. This grants Barker more freedom to explore her characters and their actions, the descriptions of which might be considered libellous if attributed to real people. A major theme of the book, Prior's intense and indiscriminate bisexuality, is effectively contrasted with Rivers's tepid asexuality and Sassoon's pure homosexuality. Greater fictional scope also permits a deeper treatment of the psychological, political and professional life of the central character, Billy Prior.

== Real people who appear in the Regeneration trilogy ==
- Winston Churchill
- Charles Lutwidge Dodgson
- Robert Graves
- Henry Head
- Edward Marsh
- Wilfred Owen
- William Rivers
- Robert Baldwin Ross
- Bertrand Russell
- Siegfried Sassoon
- Harold Sherwood Spencer
- Lewis Yealland
- Alice Wheeldon (Beatrice Roper)
- Hettie Wheeldon (Roper)
