= Lewis Yealland =

Lewis Ralph Yealland (1884 – 2 March 1954) was a Canadian-born therapist who moved to the United Kingdom to practise medicine during the First World War and was at the forefront of experimental shock techniques to treat shell shock.

== Early life and education ==
Yealland qualified from the University of Western Ontario in 1912. He was married to Anne "Nancy" Yealland, née Harris (1894–1984); she died 21 February 1984, and her ashes were scattered at the Parish of the Ascension Burial Ground in Cambridge.

== War work ==
Yealland moved to London during World War I and worked at the National Hospital for the paralyzed and epileptic; there, he mainly dealt with cases of hysteria. Yealland did not consider shell shock an illness, and he believed men showing such symptoms displayed a lack of discipline or sense of duty. He practised a form of therapy based on punishment. He was an exponent of auto-suggestion. He gained a reputation for curing and sending his patients back to the trenches quickly. Yealland published his wartime findings in Hysterical Disorders of Warfare in 1918. Allegedly, Yealland claimed a success rate of 100 per cent, and while his methods of treatment were regarded as particularly unethical by the academic discourse of the 1980s, more recent research suggests that his poor reputation might have come about owing to an over-representation of successful cases in Yealland's own works.

== In popular culture ==
Lewis Yealland appears in Pat Barker's Regeneration, where he is portrayed unsympathetically, treating a shell-shocked man suffering from hysterical mutism using electric shock treatment and showing no compassion for his patient.
