= Craiglockhart Hydropathic =

Hospital and later university building in Edinburgh, Scotland

Coordinates: 55.91812°N 3.24019°W

Craiglockhart Hydropathic, now a part of Edinburgh Napier University and known as Craiglockhart Campus, is a building with surrounding grounds in Craiglockhart, Edinburgh, Scotland. As part of a large extension programme by the university in the early 2000s the original building and surrounding campus underwent significant restoration and modernisation; as a result, many of the original interior features of the building are no longer visible. The exterior of the building has been preserved.

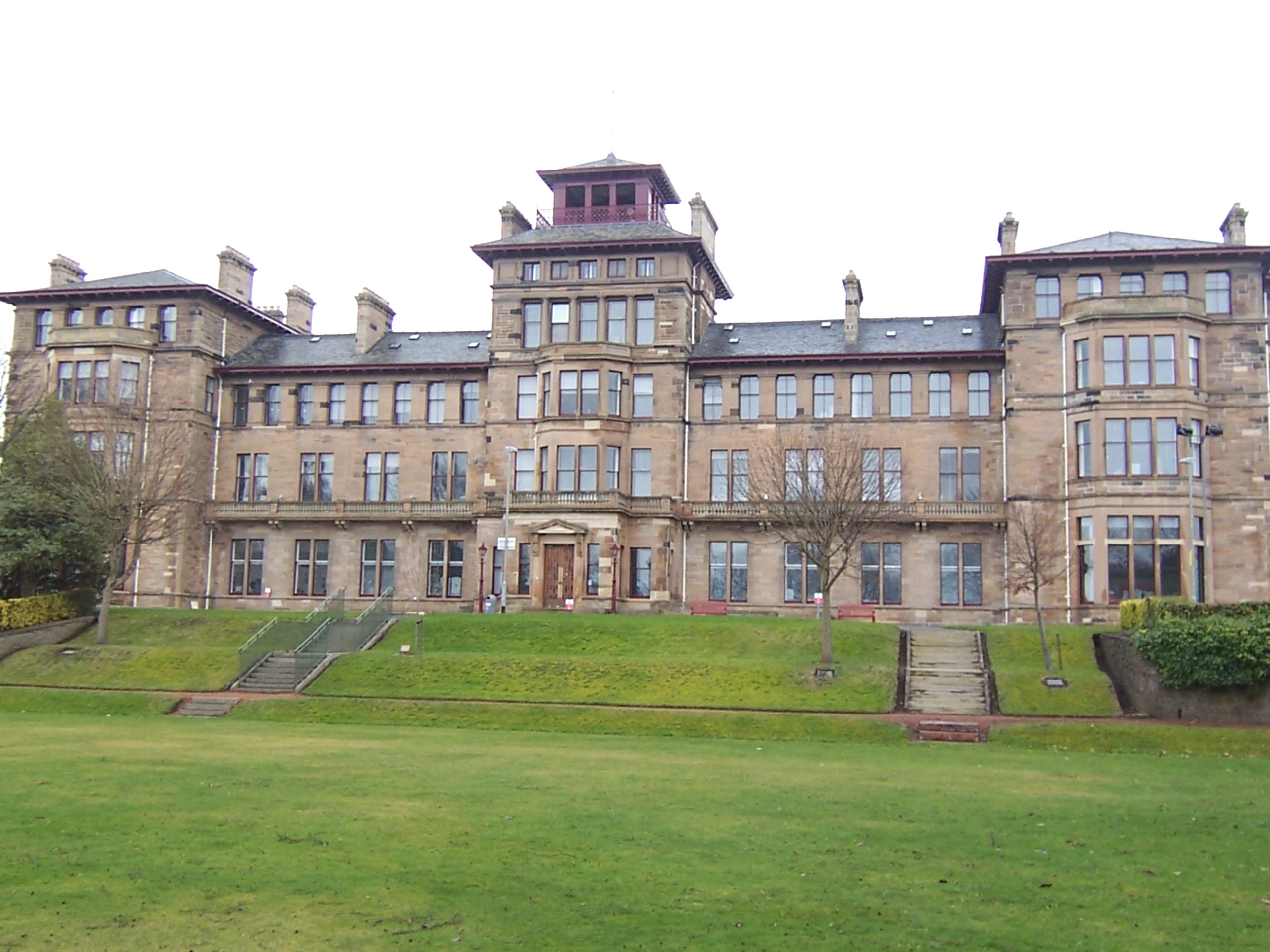
Main front showing the scale of the Hydropathic

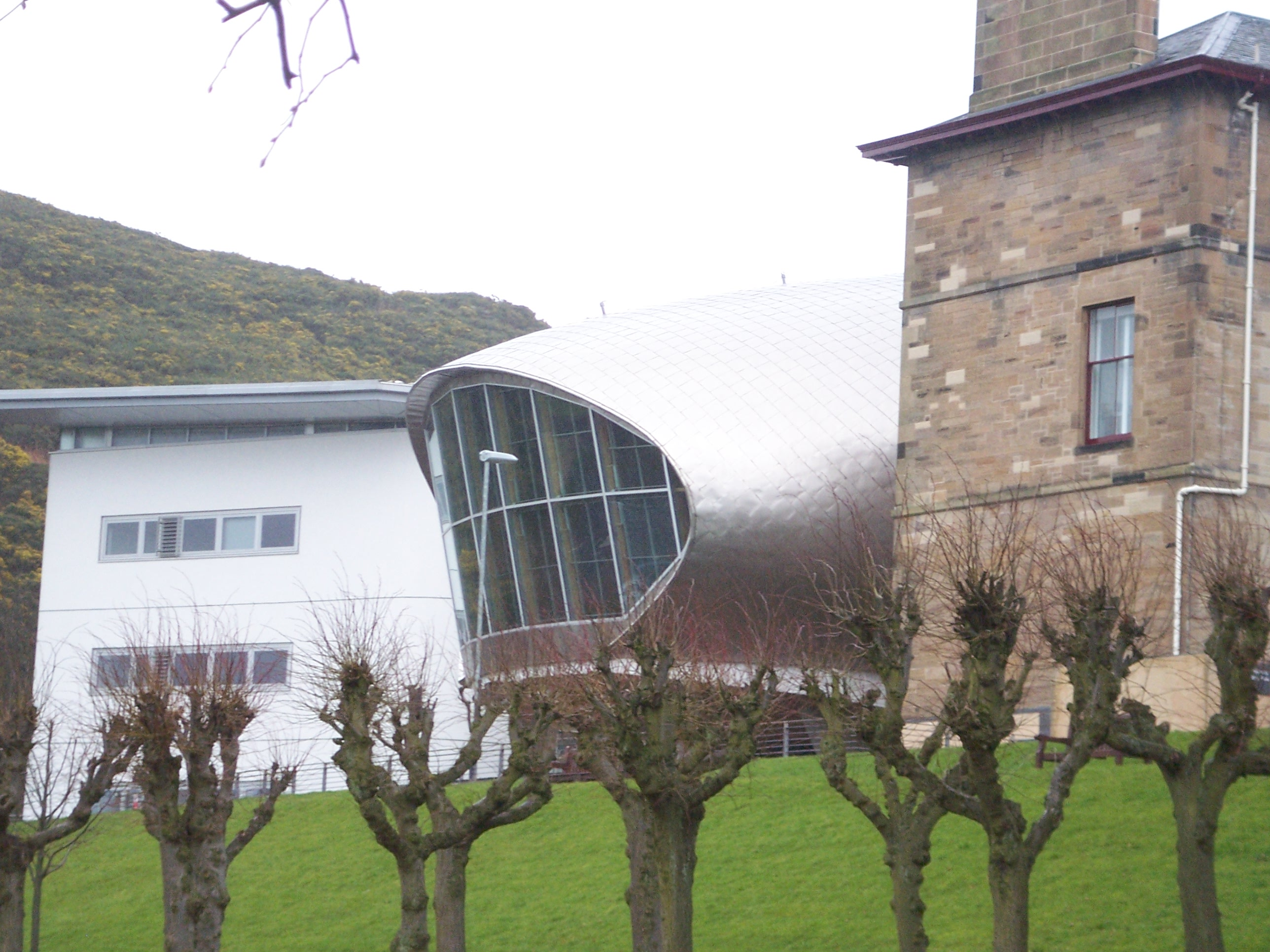
View of the side of the campus showing the original Hydropathic building and the newly built Business School.

== Origins ==
The estate in which the Hydropathic's building lies was sold in 1773 to Alexander Monro, who was second of three generations to be Professor of Anatomy at the University of Edinburgh. It stayed in the Monro family for more than a hundred years.

== The Hydropathic and the War Hospital ==
In 1877, the estate became the property of the Craiglockhart Hydropathic Company, who set about building a hydropathic institute. The Hydropathic was built in the Italian style by Architects Peddie & Kinnear. Among its facilities was a large baths department including a Victorian Turkish baths seen as an exemplar for Turkish baths which were used at different times by male and female bathers. Craiglockhart remained as a hydropathic, until the advent of the First World War. Between 1916 and 1919 the building was used as a military psychiatric hospital for the treatment of shell-shocked officers.

Probably the most famous patients of Craiglockhart were the poets Siegfried Sassoon and Wilfred Owen, whose poems appeared in the hospital's own magazine called The Hydra. Wilfred Owen was the editor of the magazine during his stay. Siegfried Sassoon was sent to Craiglockhart, as a response to his "Soldier's Declaration", an anti-war letter. He later wrote about his experiences at the hospital in his semi-autobiographical novel, Sherston's Progress. There is now an area within the building that celebrates the life and work of both Sassoon and Owen and their meeting at Craiglockhart.

The best known of the doctors assigned there was W. H. R. Rivers. The Hospital featured in the 1991 book Regeneration by Pat Barker, and the 1997 film adaptation by the same name, in which the institution was known as Craiglockhart War Hospital.

== Later uses ==
The building then became a convent for the Society of the Sacred Heart, before serving as a Catholic teacher training college. It then passed to the then Napier College, and was used by that institution and its successor, Napier Polytechnic; thus it is now part of Edinburgh Napier University. Much of the old building has been retained, and an extensive new wing has been built behind it to house the Business School.

== See also ==
- Alexander Monro tertius
- Regeneration (1997 film) - set, but not filmed, here.
