= Stanislav Vinaver =

Serbian writer (1891–1955)

- Станислав Винавер
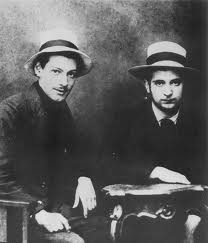
- Milutin Bojić (left) and Stanislav Vinaver (right)
- Born: 1 March 1891; Šabac, Kingdom of Serbia
- Died: 1 August 1955 (aged 64); Niška Banja, PR Serbia, FPR Yugoslavia
- Resting place: New Cemetery, Belgrade
- Education: University of Paris
- Occupation: Writer • poet • translator • journalist
- Spouse: Elsa Vinaver
- Children: 2
- Writing career
- Years active: 1911–1955

Stanislav Vinaver (Serbian Cyrillic: Станислав Винавер; 1 March 1891 – 1 August 1955) was a Serbian writer, poet, translator and journalist. Vinaver was born to affluent Ashkenazi Jewish parents that had immigrated to Serbia from Poland in the late 19th century. He studied at the University of Paris, volunteered to fight in the Balkan Wars and later took part in World War I as an officer in the Royal Serbian Army. In 1915, he lost his father to typhus. He travelled to France and the United Kingdom the following year, delivering lectures about Serbia and its people. In 1917, he was assigned to the Serbian consulate in Petrograd, where he was to witness the Russian Revolution and its aftermath.

Following World War I, Vinaver briefly worked for the Ministry of Education of the newly created Kingdom of Serbs, Croats and Slovenes (later Yugoslavia). In the 1930s, he worked for Radio Belgrade and was appointed chief of Yugoslavia's central press bureau. This period was defined by his tumultuous relationship with his ethnic German wife, who held antisemitic and anti-Slavic views, as well as his inclusion in Rebecca West's acclaimed travel book Black Lamb and Grey Falcon. In April 1941, Vinaver was mobilized to fight in the Royal Yugoslav Army, following the German-led Axis invasion of Yugoslavia. Vinaver survived the invasion, but was captured by the Germans and interned at a prisoner-of-war camp near Osnabrück. His status as a former Royal Yugoslav Army officer saved him from probable death, but his elderly mother was not as fortunate, and was murdered in the gas chambers the following year.

After the war, Vinaver returned to Yugoslavia, but given his service in the interwar government, he did not receive a warm welcome. The Yugoslav monarchy had been replaced with a communist government under the leadership of Josip Broz Tito, and Vinaver's works were blacklisted due to his Serbian nationalist views and modernist style. He worked as a translator in the immediate post-war years and served as the editor of a literary journal until his death in 1955, aged 64. He is considered one of the key representatives of the Serbian and Yugoslav literary avant-garde.

== Life ==
Stanislav Vinaver was born in Šabac on 1 March 1891. He came from an affluent family. His father Josif was a physician and his mother Ruža was a pianist and Polish-language translator. Both of his parents were Ashkenazi Jews. They had relocated to Serbia in the 1880s amid a wave of anti-Semitic pogroms in the Russian Empire. Vinaver completed his primary education in Šabac. He attended high school in Šabac until 1908, when he transferred to a high school in the Serbian capital, Belgrade. Upon completing high school, he enrolled at the University of Paris, where he studied mathematics and physics. He also attended the lectures of the philosopher Henri Bergson and the anthropologist Lucien Lévy-Bruhl, and studied music under Wanda Landowska. It was during this time that he became interested in contemporary literature and art. Bergson's philosophical teachings left a strong impression on the young Vinaver.

In 1912, Vinaver returned to Serbia to enlist in the Royal Serbian Army (Serbian: Vojska kraljevine Srbije; VKS) and fight in the Balkan Wars. During the First Balkan War, he served as a lieutenant in the Students' Battalion. By 1914, he had published three books. Following the outbreak of World War I, he reenlisted and again fought with the Students' Battalion, which played an important role in defending Serbia from Austria-Hungary in the early months of the conflict. Vinaver distinguished himself in action and was deemed a war hero by his contemporaries. His father, an officer in the medical corps, died of typhus in 1915. (Note: Šašić writes that Vinaver's father died of malaria.) That November, Serbia was overwhelmed by a combined Austro-Hungarian, German and Bulgarian invasion, forcing the VKS to retreat across Albania to the Greek island of Corfu. Vinaver took part in the retreat, and in 1916, he was appointed the editor-in-chief of Srpske Novine (The Serbian Newspaper). Later that year, Vinaver was dispatched to France and the United Kingdom by Slobodan Jovanović, the head of the Serbian military press bureau, to deliver lectures about Serbia and the Serbian people. He was accompanied by the philosopher Branislav Petronijević and the bishop Nikolaj Velimirović. In 1917, Vinaver joined the Serbian diplomatic mission in Petrograd (modern-day Saint Petersburg), working as a translator. He arrived in Petrograd about a month before the outbreak of the Russian Revolution, and witnessed the political and social upheaval that it caused. His time in the Russian capital was spent gathering volunteers for the Macedonian front.

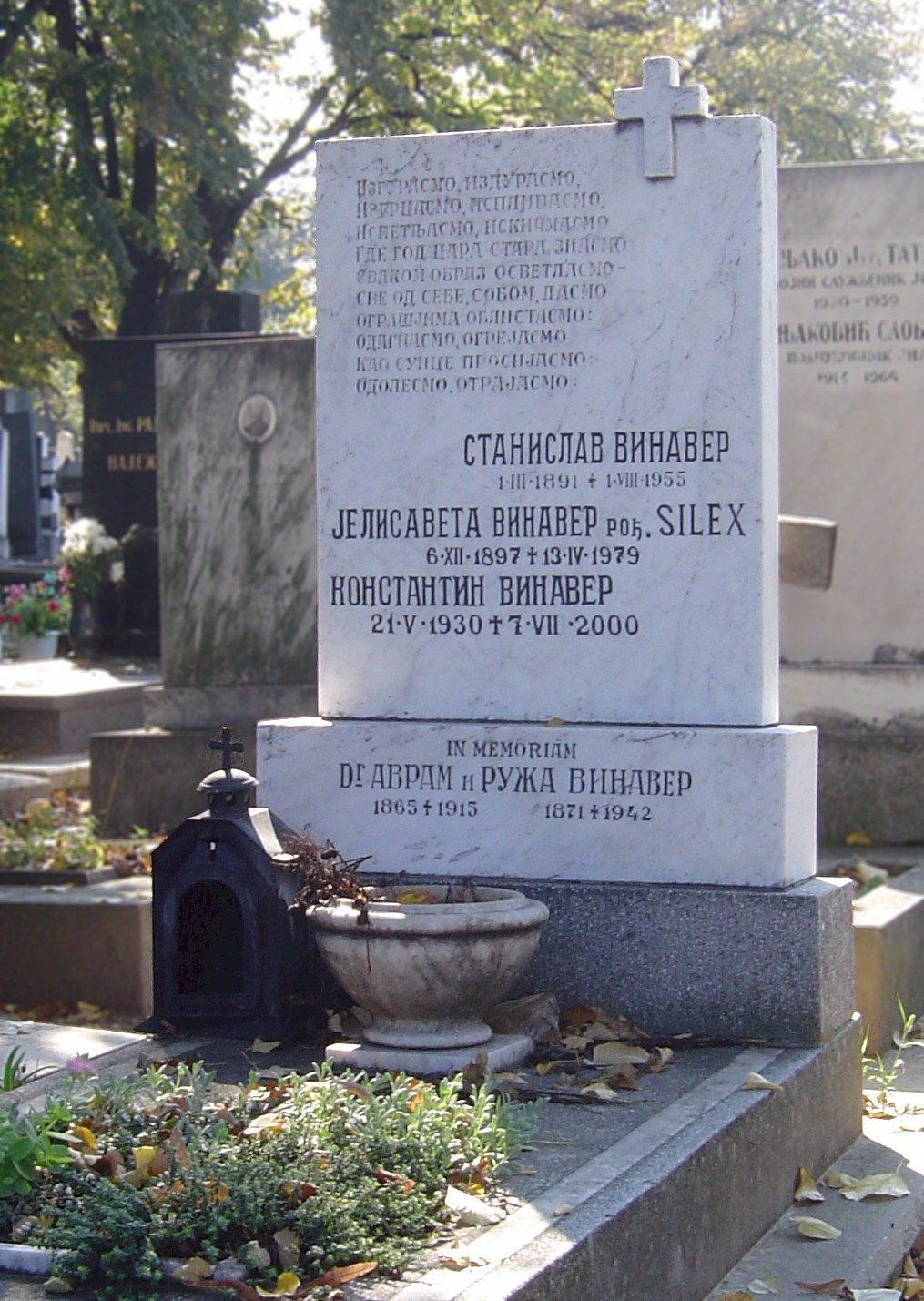
Vinaver's grave in Belgrade's New Cemetery

At the war's end, Vinaver held the rank of lieutenant colonel. In 1919, he joined the Ministry of Education of the newly created Kingdom of Serbs, Croats and Slovenes, working alongside fellow writers Branislav Nušić and Borisav Stanković at the ministry's artistic department. He nearly lost his job following a dispute with the country's Minister of Foreign Affairs, Ante Trumbić. In 1920, the artistic department was shut down following a government reshuffling, and Trumbić's antagonism precluded Vinaver from taking up further government positions. Vinaver took up journalism full-time and became one of interwar Yugoslavia's most prolific columnists. In the 1930s, he began working at Radio Belgrade and was appointed chief of Yugoslavia's central press bureau. In 1938 he was appointed press attaché at the Embassy of Yugoslavia in Prague.

Vinaver was a convert to Serbian Orthodoxy and identified as a Serb, despite his Jewish heritage. He was married to an ethnic German woman named Elsa. As a result of Elsa's anti-Semitic and anti-Slavic views, the marriage was a tumultuous one. The couple had two children. Vinaver features prominently in Rebecca West's acclaimed 1941 travel guide Black Lamb and Grey Falcon, appearing under the pseudonym Constantine. His wife appears under the pseudonym Gerda. In April 1941, Vinaver was mobilized to fight in the Royal Yugoslav Army, following the German-led Axis invasion of Yugoslavia. He survived the invasion, but was captured by the Wehrmacht and interned at a prisoner-of-war camp near Osnabrück. Vinaver's status as a former Royal Yugoslav Army officer saved him from probable death. His elderly mother was not as fortunate and was murdered in the gas chambers in 1942 as part of the Holocaust.

Following the war, Vinaver returned to Yugoslavia, but given his service in the interwar government, he was not warmly received. The Yugoslav monarchy had been replaced with a communist government under the leadership of Josip Broz Tito, and the publication of Vinaver's works was discouraged, alongside those of writers such as Jovan Dučić and Miloš Crnjanski. Vinaver was a Serbian nationalist. In addition, his overtly modernist style conflicted with that of socialist realism, which was officially sanctioned by the government. Vinaver worked as a translator in the immediate post-war years. While he did establish a literary journal called Republika, which was viewed with suspicion by the communist authorities, he did not make any effort to reclaim his former esteemed position within the Yugoslav literary milieu. Vinaver wrote for Republika from 1950 until his death. He died in Niška Banja on 1 August 1955.

== Style and themes ==
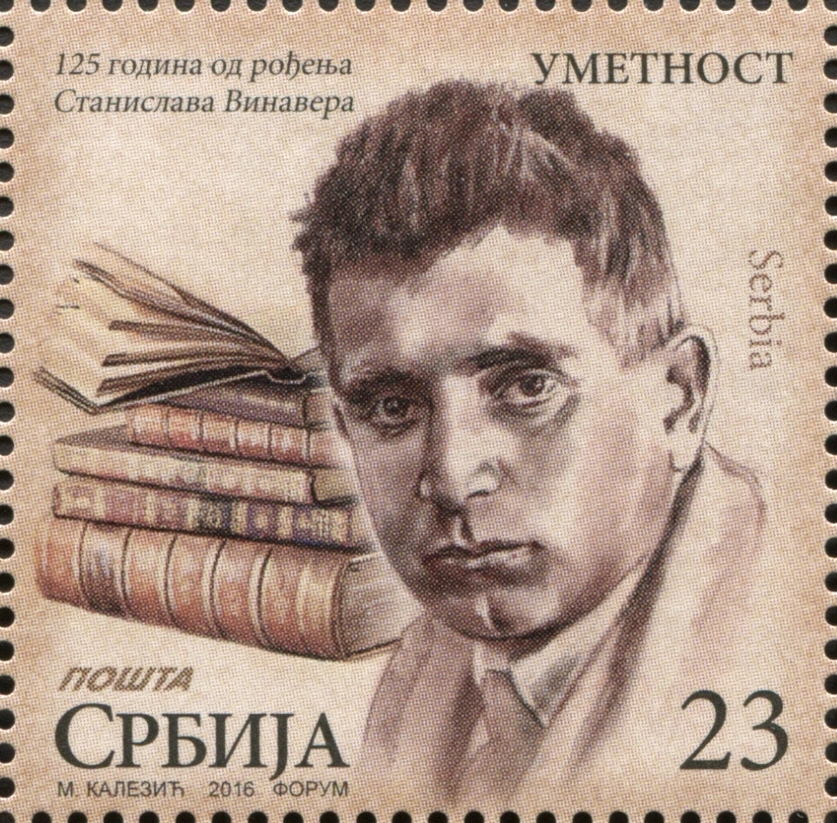
Vinaver on a 2016 Serbian postage stamp

Vinaver was an avant-gardiste. He authored the first avant-garde programmatic text in Serbian literature, Manifest ekspresionističke škole (Manifesto of the Expressionist School; 1920). He often resorted to burlesque and used parody as a means of mocking both friends and enemies, the weak and the powerful, as well as the avant-garde, and even himself. This is best exemplified in his 1920 anthology Pantologija novije srpske pelengirike (The Pantology of New Serbian Peasant Trousers), which takes aim at the conservative writer Bogdan Popović's influential 1911 compendium Antologija novije srpske lirike (Anthology of New Serbian Poetry). "The parodies were not just a game of virtuosity," the literary scholar Svetlana Slapšak writes. "They challenged the accepted literary chronologies, genre schemes and value systems." Vinaver continued writing parodies even after the war, despite his Holocaust experience, this time targeting Yugoslavia's new communist authorities.

Slapšak describes Vinaver as a "unique and versatile" writer. In his journalistic endeavours, the biographer Branko Šašić writes, Vinaver wrote in a manner that was "concise, brief and clear". Most prolific as an essayist and a poet, Vinaver made his literary debut in 1911, with a collection of poetry titled Mjeća. His poetry was written in free verse, with exclusive emphasis placed on sound rather than semantics. "He excelled in metrics and prosody and was capable of writing a pastiche of any poetic form," Slapšak writes, "though he went beyond the pastiche by deliberately slipping into the carnivalesque or even into nonsense." Slapšak believes that Vinaver used nonsense as a means of magnifying non sequiturs and logical fallacies, thereby exposing academic discourse and even the avant-garde itself to mockery and ridicule.

Vinaver sporadically resorted to Greco-Roman mythology as a literary device, referring to the Classics ironically, naming texts after well known myths, or referencing them to reinforce an argument. This is best exemplified by his 1937 lecture Ikarov let: Sudbina današnje književnosti (The Flight of Icarus: The Fate of Contemporary Literature), in which Vinaver used the myth of Icarus and Daedalus as a metaphor for the state of modern poetry. He argued that contemporary poets were "flying between the sun of metaphysics and the water of social conformity," and that if they were not careful, they were "doomed to perish without a trace." "Vinaver," the historian Milan Ristović writes, "was in favour of a complete break with the traditional understanding of literature and of a radically avant-garde, new literature, a new poetics and a new understanding of language."

== Legacy ==
Vinaver is considered one of the key representatives of the Serbian and Yugoslav literary avant-garde. Literary critics consider his Pantologija to be the best avant-garde parody in all of Serbian literature. In September 2011, the Government of Serbia unveiled a commemorative plaque dedicated to Vinaver on the façade of the Belgrade building in which his apartment was located. The Stanislav Vinaver Award is presented for artistic excellence in the writing of short stories. Notable recipients include the Serbian-Jewish writer David Albahari.

== Works ==
- Mjeća, 1911.
- Priče koje su izgubile ravnotežu, 1913.
- Varoš zlih volšebnika, 1920.
- Pantologija novije srpske pelengirike, 1920.
- Varoš zlih volšebnika, 1920.
- Gromobran svemira, 1921.
- Jezičke mogućnosti, 1922.
- Nova pantologija pelengirike, 1922.
- Čuvari sveta, 1926.
- Goč gori, jedna jugoslovenska simfonija, 1927.
- Šabac i njegove tradicije, 1935.
- Ikarov let, 1937.
- Čardak ni na nebu ni na zemlji, 1938.
- Momčilo Nastasijević, 1938.
- Najnovija pantologija srpske i jugoslovenske pelengirike, 1938.
- Živi okviri, 1938.
- Ratni drugovi, 1939.
- Pokušaji ritmičkog proučavanja muškog deseterca, 1940.
- Godine poniženja i borbe, život u nemačkim „oflazima“, 1945.
- Evropska noć, 1952.
- Jezik naš nasušni, 1952.
- Nadgramatika, 1963.
- Zanosi i prkosi Laze Kostića, 1963 (posthumous).
- One Thousand and One Nights, translation.

== Bibliography ==
- Denitch, Bogdan (1994). Ethnic Nationalism: The Tragic Death of Yugoslavia. Minneapolis, Minnesota: University of Minnesota Press. ISBN 978-0-81662-459-1.
- Gibb, Lorna (2013). West's World: The Extraordinary Life of Dame Rebecca West. New York, New York: Pan Macmillan. ISBN 978-0-23077-149-9.
- Greble, Emily (2011). Sarajevo, 1941–1945: Muslims, Christians, and Jews in Hitler's Europe. Ithaca, New York: Cornell University Press. ISBN 978-0-8014-4921-5.
- Jović, Bojan (2016). "From Ithaca to Magna Graecia, Icaria and Hyperborea – Some Aspects of the Classical Tradition in the Serbian Avant-Garde". In Goldwyn, Adam J.; Nikopoulos, James (eds.). Brill's Companion to the Reception of Classics in International Modernism and the Avant-Garde. Leiden, Netherlands: BRILL. pp. 73–105. ISBN 978-9-00433-549-3.
- Mihailovich, Vasa D. (1988). Serbian Poetry from the Beginnings to the Present. New Haven, Connecticut: Yale University Press. ISBN 978-0-93658-611-3.
- Miller, Nick (2007). The Nonconformists: Culture, Politics, and Nationalism in a Serbian Intellectual Circle, 1944–1991. Budapest, Hungary: Central European University Press. ISBN 978-9-63977-613-5.
- Newman, John Paul (2015). Yugoslavia in the Shadow of War: Veterans and the Limits of State Building, 1903–1945. Cambridge, England: Cambridge University Press. ISBN 978-1-10707-076-9.
- O'Malley, Seamus (2015). Making History New: Modernism and Historical Narrative. Oxford, England: Oxford University Press. ISBN 978-0-19936-423-7.
- Petzer, Tatjana (2021). "Rhythms of Creation: The Impact of Bergsonian Thought on Serbian Modernism". In Hansen-Kokoruš, Renate; Terpitz, Olaf (eds.). Jewish Literatures and Cultures in Southeastern Europe: Experiences, Positions, Memories. Göttingen, Germany: Vandenhoeck & Ruprecht. pp. 143–160. ISBN 978-3-2052-1288-1.
- Ristović, Milan (2016). "The Jews of Serbia (1804–1918): From Princely Protection to Formal Emancipation". In Catalan, Tullia; Dogo, Marco (eds.). The Jews and the Nation-States of Southeastern Europe from the 19th Century to the Great Depression: Combining Viewpoints on a Controversial Story. Cambridge, England: Cambridge Scholars Publishing. pp. 23–50. ISBN 978-1-44389-662-7.
- Šašić, Branko (1998). "Станислав Винавер". Знаменити Шапчани и Подринци [Notable Residents of Šabac and the Podrinje] (in Serbian). Šabac, Serbia: Štampa "Dragan Srnić". pp. 53–58.
- Slapšak, Svetlana (2004). "Stanislav Vinaver: Subversion of, or Intervention in Literary History?". In Cornis-Pope, Marcel; Neubauer, John (eds.). History of the Literary Cultures of East-Central Europe: Junctures and Disjunctures in the 19th and 20th Centuries. History of the Literary Cultures of East-Central Europe. Vol. 1. Philadelphia, Pennsylvania: John Benjamins Publishing. pp. 414–416. ISBN 978-90-27234-52-0.
- Vidaković-Petrov, Krinka (2014). "From Sephardic Traditional to Modern Serbian/Yugoslav Literature". In Weiss, Hillel; Katsman, Roman; Kotlerman, Ber (eds.). Around the Point: Studies in Jewish Literature and Culture in Multiple Languages. Cambridge, England: Cambridge Scholars Publishing. pp. 434–452. ISBN 978-1-44385-752-9.
- Vidan, Aida (2016). "Serbian Poetry". In Greene, Roland; Cushman, Stephen (eds.). The Princeton Handbook of World Poetries. Princeton, New Jersey: Princeton University Press. pp. 492–494. ISBN 978-1-40088-063-8.
- Wachtel, Andrew Baruch (1998). Making a Nation, Breaking a Nation: Literature and Cultural Politics in Yugoslavia. Stanford, California: Stanford University Press. ISBN 978-0-80473-181-2.
- Wachtel, Andrew; Marković, Predrag J. (2008). "A Last Attempt at Educational Integration: The Failure of Common Educational Cores in Yugoslavia in the Early 1980s". In Cohen, Lenard J.; Dragović-Soso, Jasna (eds.). State Collapse in South-Eastern Europe: New Perspectives on Yugoslavia's Disintegration. West Lafayette, Indiana: Purdue University Press. pp. 203–220. ISBN 978-1-55753-460-6.
- Young, James E. (2012). "David Albahari". The Posen Library of Jewish Culture and Civilization, 1973–2005. Vol. 10. New Haven, Connecticut: Yale University Press. pp. 188–189. ISBN 978-0-30013-553-4.
