= Black Lamb and Grey Falcon =

1941 book by Rebecca West

- First US edition; Cover art shows the Stari Most bridge in Mostar, Bosnia and Herzegovina
- Author: Rebecca West
- Language: English
- Genre: Travel
- Publisher: Macmillan, The Viking Press
- Publication date: 1941

Black Lamb and Grey Falcon: A Journey Through Yugoslavia is a travel book written by Dame Rebecca West, published in 1941 in two volumes by Macmillan in the UK and by The Viking Press in the US.

The book is over 1,100 pages in modern editions and gives an account of Balkan history and ethnography during West's six-week trip to Yugoslavia in 1937. West's objective was "to show the past side by side with the present it created". Publication of the book coincided with the Nazi Invasion of Yugoslavia, and West added a foreword highly praising the Yugoslavs for their brave defiance of Germany. The book's epigraph reads: "To my friends in Yugoslavia, who are now all dead or enslaved".

The character of "Constantine" is supposedly based on Stanislav Vinaver. Anica Savić Rebac, under the name of Milica, appears not only as a new friend, but also as the intellectual guide who eventually reveals to Rebecca West the rituals which would lead the author to the title metaphor of her vision of the Balkans.

== Plot ==
The book details the six-week journey West made, with her husband, to Yugoslavia in 1937. During the trip, West and her husband travelled to Croatia, Dalmatia, Herzegovina, Bosnia, Serbia, Macedonia and Montenegro.

It provides a graphic account of the context of the assassination of Archduke Franz Ferdinand.

== Background ==
The book's title draws from historical symbols of the Balkans. The black lamb "is the symbol, seen in a gypsy rite in Macedonia, of false -- and thus of impious -- sacrifice" while the grey falcon "is an enigmatic figure in a Slav folksong about a military defeat in the year 1389". West's original intent was to rapidly write the work. It ended up taking five years to write beginning in 1936. West's biographer, Victoria Glendinning, called it "the central book of her life".

It is "a key book about Yugoslavia" with Robert Kaplan using it heavily during his travels in that country.

== Style ==
Reviewer Geoff Dyer described the book as "a work of literature". Woods said the book "is carried out with tireless percipience, nourished from almost bewildering erudition, chronicled with a thoughtfulness itself fervent and poetic". According to Dyer, a major theme was "the vexed relations of men and women". He notes her frequent forays into history and other topics throughout the work:

Something catches West’s attention; the incident – a Mozart symphony coming on the radio in a restaurant on page 507, say – is conveyed with vivid immediacy. As West articulates and processes this experience, she takes us on a discursive journey into the furthest reaches of speculative thought before returning us to the exact spot or occasion from which we started.

== Reception ==
According to a 1941 review in the New York Times by Katherine Woods, the work was "unique" as a travel book and "brilliantly objective". She found its historical treatment noteworthy.

The book appeared at No. 18 on National Review's Best Non-Fiction Books of the 20th century. It is No. 38 on the Random House Modern Library list of the best 100 non-fiction books of the 20th century.

American writer Larry McMurtry wrote in a 2005 essay that "there are only a few great travel books. Rebecca West's Black Lamb and Grey Falcon is one." In 2006, reviewer Geoff Dyer stated that the book was "one of the supreme masterpieces of the 20th century".

American writer Brian Hall wrote in his book, The Impossible Country, that "after four years of writing...and 1,100 densely packed pages...she succeeded only in representing the Serb viewpoint".

== Bibliography ==
- Dyer, Geoff (5 August 2006). "Journeys into history: Geoff Dyer on Rebecca West's Black Lamb and Grey Falcon". The Guardian.
- West, Rebecca (2006). Black Lamb and Grey Falcon: A Journey Through Yugoslavia. Canongate Books Ltd. ISBN 978-1-84195-787-6.
- Woods, Katherine (26 October 1941). "Rebecca West's Brilliant Mosaic of Yugoslavian Travel". The New York Times on the Web. The New York Times Company.
