= The Return of the Soldier (play) =

- Original language: English
- Written by: John Van Druten
- Genre: Drama

Premiere
- Date: 12 June 1928
- Place: Playhouse Theatre, London

The Return of the Soldier is a 1928 play by the British writer John Van Druten. It is an adaptation of Rebecca West's 1918 novel of the same title about a shell shocked officer returning from the First World War with amnesia who is no longer in love with his wife.

It was staged at the Playhouse Theatre in the West End, running for 46 performances. The cast included Cyril Raymond, Aubrey Mather, Eliot Makeham, Mary Clare and Grizelda Hervey.

== Bibliography ==
- J. P. Wearing. The London Stage 1920-1929: A Calendar of Productions, Performers, and Personnel. Rowman & Littlefield, 2014.
