= Jessie Scott (medical doctor) =

New Zealand medical doctor, and prisoner of war (1883–1959)

Jessie Ann Scott
- Born: 9 August 1883; Brookside, North Canterbury, New Zealand
- Died: 15 August 1959 (aged 76)
- Education: Christchurch Girls' High School; University of Edinburgh
- Occupation: Physician
- Medical career
- Institutions: Edinburgh Hospital for Women and Children; Scottish Women's Hospitals for Foreign Service; London County Council; Serbian Army; Royal Army Medical Corps; Queen Charlotte's and Chelsea Hospital; Victoria Hospital for Children; Christchurch Public Hospital; New Zealand Medical Women's Association
- Awards: Order of St Sava

Jessie Ann Scott (9 August 1883 – 15 August 1959) was a New Zealand medical doctor, medical officer and prisoner of war.

== Early life ==
Jessie Scott was born in Brookside, North Canterbury, New Zealand, in 1883 and attended Christchurch Girls' High School. She studied medicine at the University of Edinburgh, graduating MB ChB in 1909 and MD in 1912.

== Career ==
Scott remained in Edinburgh after her training and worked as the resident medical officer at the Edinburgh Hospital for Women and Children. During this time, she was a guest speaker, along with Dr Elsie Inglis, Chrystal MacMillan and Alice Low, at an NUWSS meeting in Edinburgh's Café Oak Hall.

She then became assistant medical officer to the London County Council for three years from 1910 to 1913. During this time she completed her MD thesis in public health. She returned to New Zealand in 1913 and practiced in Auckland, including leading an isolation hospital during the smallpox epidemic in 1913.

Following the outbreak of World War I, Scott's friend Ettie Rout approached her on behalf of the New Zealand Volunteer Sisterhood. Rout requested that Scott lead the first band of volunteers to nurse the sick and wounded of the New Zealand Expeditionary Force in Egypt. Though Scott originally accepted this offer, she later decided to return to the United Kingdom and join the Scottish Women's Hospitals for Foreign Service in a unit staffed by women. She served in Serbia, where she was captured by the Austrians and kept a prisoner of war for four months, and later became a medical officer with the Serbian Army. Scott was released and allowed to return to England in February 1916.

Following her release, Scott went with her unit to the Russian front in Romania where they faced hazardous conditions. In 1919 she worked with the Royal Army Medical Corps in Salonika and France.

For her service in Serbia, Scott was awarded the Order of St Sava 4th class by the Serbian government.

In 1920, after the war, Scott returned to London where she completed postgraduate work in gynaecology and paediatrics at Chelsea Hospital for Women and Victoria Hospital for Children, and worked for the London County Council as a medical officer.

In 1924, she returned to Christchurch where she worked as an obstetrician and gynaecologist in the public hospital. After being frustrated by obstructions from male colleagues she went into private practice.

Scott served on many organisations including the National Council of Women, the Federation of University Women, and the Women's War Service Auxiliary during World War Two. She became one of two vice-presidents of the Christchurch branch of the New Zealand Medical Women's Association in 1954. She gave the first medical presentation to the branch on her experiences during World War One in the Scottish Medical Women's Hospital in Serbia.

Jessie Scott died in August 1959 in Christchurch.

== See also ==
- Other notable women volunteers in the Scottish Women's Hospitals for Foreign Service
- Women in World War I
- The Serbian campaign (1914–1915)
