= Letitia Fairfield =

British Australian doctor (1885–1978)

Dr Letitia Fairfield CBE MB CM MD
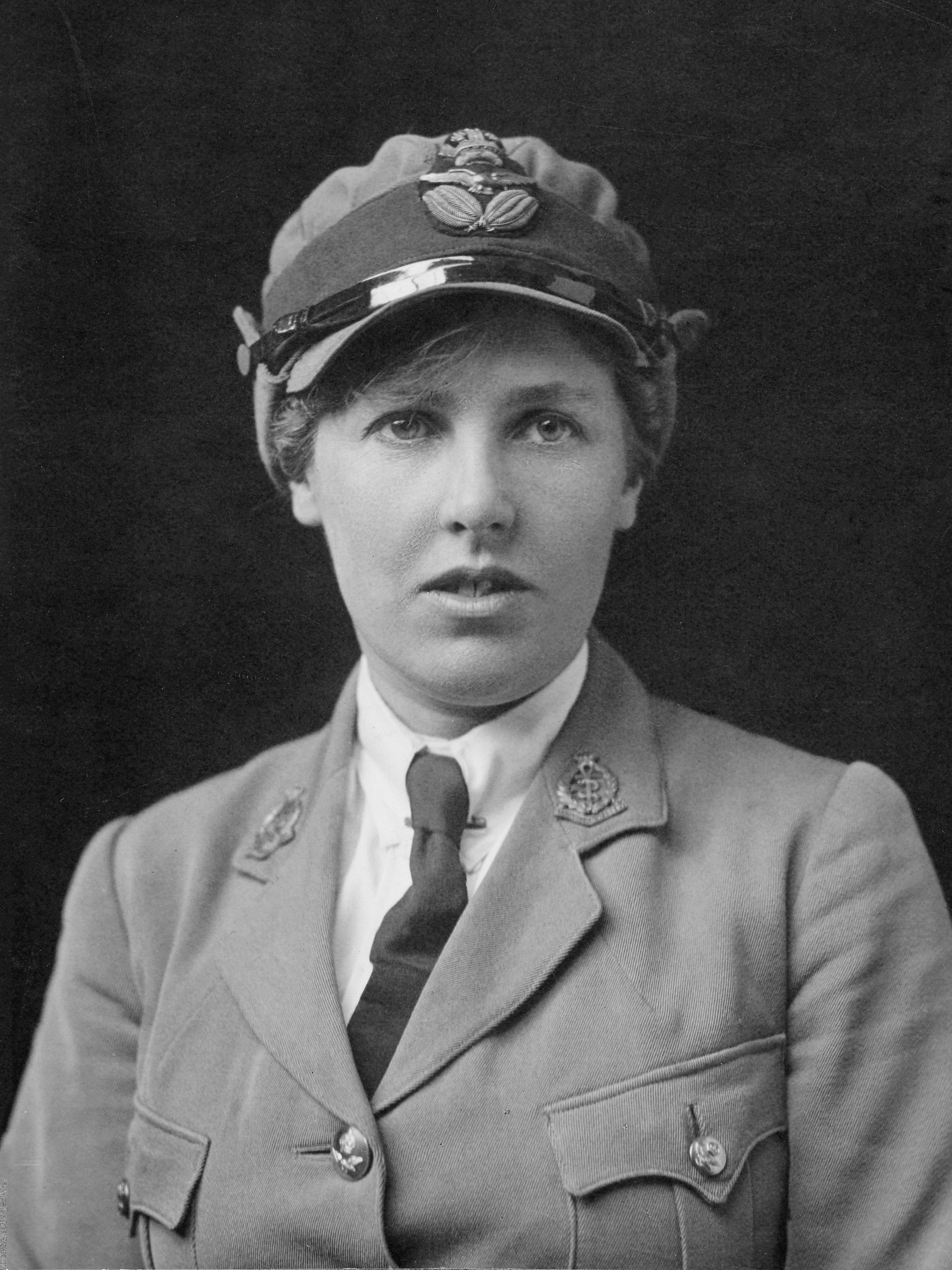
- Letitia Fairfield circa 1917
- Born: Josephine Letitia Denny Fairfield; 10 March 1885; Melbourne, Australia
- Died: 1 February 1978 (aged 92); St Mary Abbots Hospital, London, England
- Education: Richmond High School for Girls; George Watson's Ladies' College; Edinburgh School of Medicine for Women; University of Edinburgh
- Occupation: Medical Officer
- Family: Rebecca West (sister); Anthony West (nephew)

Josephine Letitia Denny Fairfield CBE MB CM MD (10 March 1885 – 1 February 1978) was a medical doctor, a lawyer, a war-worker, and the first ever female Chief Medical Officer for London. She received a CBE for her outstanding achievements in medicine following her contributions in World War I, despite initially having been rejected by the War Office. Fairfield went on to work for the London County Council, where she campaigned for the initiation of new Public Health departments relating in particular to women's and children's health, and defending who she believed were the most vulnerable members of society. She was a feminist and a Fabian, and during her later life became a convert to Roman Catholicism and a believer in witchcraft.

== Early life and education ==
Fairfield was born in Melbourne in 1885, and was the oldest of three daughters; the youngest, Cicily, was the novelist later known as Dame Rebecca West. The sisters' parents regularly engaged their children in intellectual and political conversation, their Anglo-Irish father Charles being a journalist, and their Scottish mother Isabella being an accomplished pianist. However, the girls' upbringing became turbulent as Charles's financial irresponsibility grew. He had numerous open affairs, and some hidden ones, even keeping a secret family in America until the time of his death. By 1901, his womanising and squandering had led to the breakdown of his marriage, and he left the family home. Isabella, left without any financial support, moved with her three daughters to Edinburgh, where they lived with relatives.

Fairfield and her two sisters entered the George Watson's Ladies College, after which Fairfield was accepted into the Edinburgh Medical College for Women, an extramural school for the University of Edinburgh. Several family members disapproved of Fairfield's career choice as they felt that it was not a ladylike profession for her to enter, and believed that it would prevent her from finding a husband. Indeed, she remained unmarried and without any known love interests.

In 1907, Fairfield graduated MB ChB, and was awarded her MD degree in 1911. Despite describing some inequality between the education males and females received at medical school, Fairfield claimed to feel no resentment, and happily chose to devote her life to the profession.

== Career ==
=== War work ===
When Fairfield first applied to work for the War Office, she was rejected as it was not believed that the help of female doctors was necessary. However, several years later in 1917, following the unforeseen deaths of numerous male soldiers and doctors, the Women's Army Auxiliary Corps was established, and Fairfield was appointed as their Medical Officer. A year later, she was appointed Chief Medical Officer to the Southern Command, and was subsequently elevated to Inspector of Medical Services for the Royal Air Force; the Woman's Royal Air Force. She became responsible for the medical care of eight thousand military women, and a further twenty-two thousand at home.

Fairfield also spoke at recruiting meetings; for example in Perth in September 1918 when, along with Alice Low of Queen Mary's Army Auxiliary Corps and Mrs McRae, Principal of the WRNS she addressed a "Great Rally". She specified that she sought recruits who were "strong, intelligent,[and] active with their hands.

In 1940, Fairfield was personally sought by the War Office; she rejoined the RAMC and was appointed Senior Woman Medical Officer of the Armed Forces. In 1942, having reached retirement age for the army, she withdrew from her post and resumed her public health work with the LCC until the conception of the National Health Service in 1948.

During the spring of 1945, Fairfield is recorded as visiting Soviet prisoners of war awaiting their forcible repatriation at Newlands Corner Camp in Surrey.

=== Public health work ===
Fairfield began working for the London County Council shortly after graduating, in 1911, and continued her post there until 1948 (excluding wartime interruptions). Prior to World War I, her chief responsibilities concerned the supervision of children's health and welfare, and the inspection of specialist schools for the mentally handicapped.

In 1920, she returned to the LCC, and obtained a law degree in 1923 in order to help her tackle difficult legal issues relating to public health concerns. Following the 1929 Local Government Act, she took responsibility for London's Poor Law board hospitals, and became concerned with the improvement of maternity and obstetric care. She also dictated new public health policy regarding venereal disease.

== Personal life ==
Fairfield took an interest in many social controversies throughout her career. As a medical student and a junior doctor, she campaigned with her two sisters alongside Dame Christabel Pankhurst. She joined the militant suffragette Women's Social and Political Union, but left the group when it was felt that her professional position as a doctor may be threatened, and when she developed a critical stance against Pankhurst's authoritarianism.

During her time working with the War Office, Fairfield was an active member of the Medical Women's Federation, with whom she campaigned for female equality in medicine and at war. In 1930–1932, she was appointed President of their London Branch, and from thence she continued to fight for female doctors' concerns on behalf of the British Medical Association. Fairfield was interested in parapsychology, and was a member of the Society for Psychical Research.

Despite many differences, Fairfield and her sister Cissy remained on the same political page throughout their lives. They both joined the Fabian Society, for whom Fairfield spoke publicly and wrote regularly on female health issues. She was appointed as their Executive, put this down to her 'scarcity value' as a woman doctor. However, she was forced to leave the group shortly after World War I, as her political interests were no longer deemed compatible with advancement in her career with the LCC.

In 1922, Fairfield converted to Roman Catholicism. This came as a great surprise to her friends and family, many of whom came from Ireland and were staunch Protestants. However, she did not agree with all of the tenets of the Catholic Church, opposing, for example, opposition to birth control. Notwithstanding, her devotion led to her being awarded the papal medal, Pro Ecclesia et Pontifice in 1965.

In her final months, despite her deteriorating health, she gave numerous interviews about her extraordinary career. She revealed in one of these: "I always chose, right from the beginning of my career, things that I thought were important but not popular."

Brian Harrison recorded 2 oral history interviews with Fairfield, in December 1976 and February 1977, as part of the Suffrage Interviews project, titled Oral evidence on the suffragette and suffragist movements: the Brian Harrison interviews. Fairfield talks about her involvement with the WSPU, Independent Labour Party, the Church League for Women's Suffrage and the Fabian Society, including the Fabian Women's Group.

Fairfield died on 1 February 1978 from a succession of strokes.
