= George Frederick Abbott =

English war correspondent and author

George Frederick Abbott (28 October 1874 – 13 March 1947) was an English war correspondent and author and the husband of Wilhelmina Hay Abbott.

== Life ==
Abbott was educated at Emmanuel College, Cambridge, taking the degree of B.A. in 1899. In 1900 he was sent by Cambridge University to Macedonia to make studies in the folklore of that region. Sympathetic to the Greek cause, he stayed in Thessaloniki for some time, before visiting Serres, Sidirokastro, Meleniko and Petrich. On his return trip he stayed in Drama and Kavala and toured Mount Athos (all cities which were then under the control of the Ottoman Empire). He acted as special correspondent in southwestern Europe for several London newspapers until 1903. In 1905 he accompanied the Prince of Wales (later George V), on his tour of India.

For his contribution to Greek causes, he was awarded the decoration of Commander of the Order of the Redeemer by the Greek state. He was married to 'Elizabeth' Wilhelmina Hay Lamond (1884–1957), an equalitarian feminist campaigner, and they had one son, Commander (E) Jasper A.R. Abbott, OBE, RN (1911–1960).

His works include a study on Greek songs, a collection of folkloric material from the region of Macedonia, a treatise on Thucydides and a book on the relations between Greece and the Allies.

== Works ==
Besides contributing articles to many reviews and magazines, he wrote:

- Songs of Modern Greece (1900)
- Macedonian Folklore (1903)
- The Tale of a Tour in Macedonia (1903)
- Through India with the Prince (1906)
- Israel in Europe (editor, 1907)
- Greece in Evolution (1909)
- Turkey in Transition (1909)
- The Philosophy of a Don (1911)
- The Holy War in Tripoli (1912)
- Greece and the Allies (1914–1922)
- Turkey, Greece and the Great Powers: A Study in Friendship and Hate (1916)
- Under the Turk in Constantinople (1920)
