= Katharine Church =

British painter

Katharine "Kitty" Duff Church (4 July 1910 – 20 July 1999) was a British neo-romantic painter.

The daughter of barrister Harold Church, who was killed in World War I whilst serving as a Captain in the Oxfordshire and Buckinghamshire Light Infantry, and Elsie Neilson (née Lyle), she was born in Highgate in north London. She studied art at the Brighton School of Art, at the Royal Academy Schools between 1930 and 1933, and then at the Slade School of Fine Art in 1933 and 1934. During the early phase of her career, she exhibited regularly with the Royal Academy. In 1933, she had her first solo exhibition at the Wertheim Gallery in London. She exhibited with the New English Art Club and showed regularly with The London Group. From 1937 to 1947, she exhibited her work at the Lefevre Gallery. In 1954, she was invited to take part in the exhibition Figures in their Setting at the Tate Gallery. She was invited to exhibit at the National Museum of Wales in 1982. In 1988, a retrospective of her work was held at the Duncalfe Galleries in Harrogate.

Church operated the Hambledon Gallery at Blandford for a number of years.

In 1933, she met the painter Ivon Hitchens. She painted with him at a cottage on the Suffolk coast. Church invited John Piper and Myfanwy Evans on one such visit. During the late 1940s, she met the painter Frances Hodgkins; Hodgkins painted a portrait of Church, Portrait of Kitty West, in 1939, which is now held by the Tate.

Church married Anthony West in 1937; the couple had one son (Edmund West) and one daughter (Caroline Frances West). Among the couple's friends were the painter Julian Trevelyan and the writer Frances Partridge. The Wests divorced in 1952.

Her sister Margaret became an architect.

In 1964, she moved to Sutton House in Dorset. Church died in Wimborne Minster at the age of 89 after suffering a fall in her garden.

In 2015, John Duncalfe published Katharine Church (1910-1999): A Life in Colour. The Later Years.
