= The Return of the Soldier (film) =

- Directed by: Alan Bridges
- Written by: Hugh Whitemore
- Produced by: Simon Relph; Ann Skinner; J. Gordon Arnold
- Starring: Julie Christie; Alan Bates; Glenda Jackson; Ann-Margret
- Cinematography: Stephen Goldblatt
- Edited by: Laurence Méry-Clark
- Music by: Richard Rodney Bennett
- Distributed by: Twentieth Century Fox
- Release date: 1982
- Running time: 102 minutes
- Country: United Kingdom
- Language: English
- Budget: £1,750,000 or £2 million

The Return of the Soldier is a 1982 British drama film starring Alan Bates as Baldry and co-starring Julie Christie, Ian Holm, Glenda Jackson, and Ann-Margret about a shell-shocked officer's return from the First World War.

It was based on the 1918 novel of the same name by Rebecca West; it was directed by Alan Bridges and written by Hugh Whitemore. The film was entered into the 1982 Cannes Film Festival.

The film was the first to be given a PG certificate by the British Board of Film Classification.

== Plot ==
In 1914, a group of British soldiers is preparing to leave England to fight on the Western Front in France, led by Captain Chris Baldry. He appears at one final farewell party thrown by his wife, Kitty, appearing withdrawn and distant throughout.

The story moves on to 1916. Chris's cousin, Jenny, who lives with Kitty, is concerned because they have heard nothing from Chris's regiment, but Kitty dismisses her fears, more concerned by rising grocery prices and food rationing. Their quiet war is shattered by the unexpected visit of a Margaret Grey, who has received a telegram from Chris. She says Chris is ill and has returned to England, but does not reveal more. Kitty refuses to believe her and has her ejected. Only when she reads the telegram carefully does she realise that her husband is in a hospital in London. When they visit, Kitty and Jenny see he is being treated for shell-shock. Chris doesn't remember Kitty, and instead asks for Grey. Humiliated, his wife departs, not entirely convinced he isn't shamming.

After a few days, Captain Baldry returns home, which seems alien to him. He fails to recognise former friends, despite their efforts to reach out to him. He is more amused by simple pursuits, such as walking and staring into the river. He shows little interest in Kitty, and they sleep in separate rooms. He sends for Margaret and they recall their shared past. He had been in love with her despite his parents' opposition to her due to her working-class roots. They had a quarrel, had been forcibly parted, had accidentally lost touch and had married others. Kitty is hurt and furious that he shows more interest in Margaret than in herself. A medical expert, Doctor Anderson, advises that they allow Chris and Margaret to see each other more, something agreed to by a reluctant Kitty and by Margaret's understanding husband, William. As their relationship blossoms, it becomes apparent that his attachment to her is one of a childlike nature.

Kitty desperately wants him to be cured, and to return to the authoritative pre-war man she had known. Anderson is less keen to cure the Captain, noting how happy he is. To return him to the present, the horrors of the war and the memory of a son he lost to illness, would be cruel. He doesn't even remember the child. Finally they resolve to tell Chris about the child, seeing it as a spur that will "cure him." As Kitty watches from a window, Margaret tells him. His body demeanor changes visibly and he starts striding towards the house, looking as his cousin Jenny remarks "every inch a soldier." Kitty realizes that her husband has come back to her, even though he will likely now be sent back to the war.

== Cast ==
- Alan Bates as Captain Chris Baldry
- Julie Christie as Kitty Baldry
- Glenda Jackson as Margaret Grey
- Ann-Margret as Jenny Baldry
- Ian Holm as Doctor Anderson
- Frank Finlay as William Grey
- Jeremy Kemp as Frank
- Hilary Mason as Ward, the servant
- John Sharp as Pearson

== Production ==
In a 1982 interview with Roger Ebert, Ann-Margret recalled that Ann Skinner, who had been the "script girl" on Margret's film Magic, bought the film rights to West's novel. "Halfway through production, we went broke," Ann-Margret said. "The cast and crew kept working without being paid, and finally another British production company came through with some more money. It was a labor of love." Although the film was produced in 1982, it was not released in the U.S. until 1985 because of legal complications.

Half the budget was provided by Barry Cooper, an American orthodondist. Halfway through the film money ran out but the filmmakers managed to raise money from George Walker who had made The Bitch and The Stud and wanted to be involved in a "legitimate" film that could be shown at Cannes. Ann-Margret was cast as American financiers wished for an American name.

== Reception ==
Vincent Canby of the New York Times praised the film and wrote he "had no idea that anything depending on amnesia could still be so affecting, largely because of the splendid, perfectly integrated performances by Glenda Jackson, Julie Christie and Ann-Margret."
