= Wilhelmina Hay Abbott =

Scottish suffragist, editor and feminist lecturer

Wilhelmina "Elizabeth" Abbott
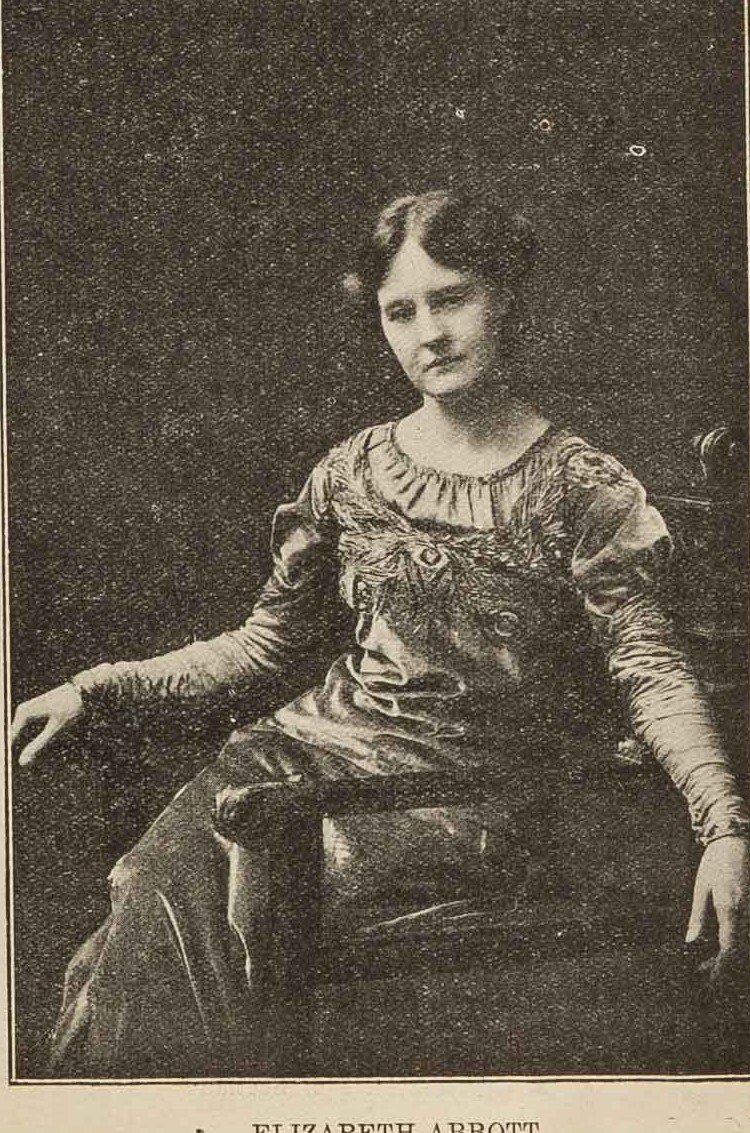
- Born: Wilhelmina Hay Lamond; 22 May 1884; Dundee, Scotland
- Died: 17 October 1957 (aged 73)
- Known for: Suffragist, editor and feminist lecturer
- Spouse: George Frederick Abbott
- Children: 1

Wilhelmina Hay Abbott (née Lamond; 22 May 1884 – 17 October 1957), also known by the name "Elizabeth Abbott," was a Scottish suffragist, editor, and feminist lecturer, and wife of author George Frederick Abbott.

== Early life and education ==
Abbott was born Wilhelmina Hay Lamond in Dundee, Scotland, on 22 May 1884. Her mother was Margaret McIntyre Morrison and her father was Andrew Lamond, a jute manufacturer and commission agent. She had one older sister, Isabel Taylor Lamond. The family moved to Tottenham when her father received a job as managing director of Henry A. Lane & Co. She was educated at the City of London School for Girls and in Brussels. She trained in London for secretarial and accounting work between 1903 and 1906, but then attended University College London in the summer of 1907, where she pursued a broader course of ethics, modern philosophy, and economics. As a young woman she began using the first name "Elizabeth."

== Career ==
In 1909 Elizabeth Lamond started organizing for the Edinburgh branch of the National Union of Women's Suffrage Societies. She made several visits to the Highlands to raise awareness and help found groups. In June 1909 she spoke at an ‘At Home’ in Inverness, resulting in 25 new members to the Inverness NUWSS society according to Common Cause, the newspaper of the National Union of Women’s Suffrage Societies. She returned in July and August, accompanied first by Miss Lisa Gordon and then later by Alice Low, for one of the more innovative and colourful campaigns in the Highlands – touring on bicycles, visiting the Black Isle, Inverness and Badenoch and Strathspey. Their accounts published in Common Cause provide insights on the campaigning techniques used by the NUWSS, and the reception towards suffrage outside of the main centres. Starting at Fortrose and Rosemarkie, they cycled to Inverness, then on to Kingussie followed by Aviemore, Newtonmore, and then on to Pitlochry and further south. In October she was back again, this time to speak at the newly established Dingwall Society.

In July 1910 she campaigned with Mary McNeill in Shetland and the Orkney Islands. On the way south, she spoke at Wick and Thurso leading to the formation of a society in Thurso, called the John o'Groats Society. Continuing south, she spoke at Grantown-on-Spey at the beginning of August, receiving detailed coverage in the local paper. In May 1912 she again visited the Highlands, now as Mrs Abbott, this time a tour of Sutherland, with meetings in Thurso, Wick, Helmsdale, Brora, Dornoch, Golspie and Bonar Bridge. Another organiser, Eleanor Sheard, spent four weeks ahead of time preparing the way with initial meetings. Their work led to the formation, or revival, of local suffrage societies in Sutherland.

Lamond took a position on the executive committee of the Scottish Federation of Women's Suffrage Societies, along with Dr. Elsie Inglis. McNeill and Inglis became doctors in the Scottish Women's Hospitals for Foreign Service.

During World War I, Lamond toured extensively in India, Australia, and New Zealand as a lecturer, for two years, raising money for the Scottish Women's Hospitals. Of her travels, she declared, "I received unbounded hospitality." After the war, she served as an officer of the International Woman Suffrage Alliance, and edited its newsletter, Jus Suffragii.

Concerned primarily about economic opportunities for women, she joined Chrystal MacMillan, Lady Rhondda, Emmeline Pethick-Lawrence and others in founding the Open Door Council (later Open Door International) in 1926. Abbott chaired the Open Door Council in 1929. She also chaired the Association for Moral and Social Hygiene for ten years, and was active with the organization for much longer.

In her later years, she continued work on women's economic security, as co-author of The Woman Citizen and Social Security (1943), which responded to gender inequalities in the Beveridge Report.

== Personal life ==
She married travel writer and war correspondent George Frederick Abbott in 1911. They had one son, Jasper A. R. Abbott, born that same year. Abbott died in 1957, age 73.
