= Anthony West (author) =

English author and literary critic

- Born: Anthony Panther West Fairfield; 4 August 1914; Hunstanton, Norfolk, England
- Died: 27 December 1987 (aged 73); Stonington, Connecticut, U.S.
- Parent(s): H. G. Wells (father); Rebecca West (mother)
- Relatives: Letitia Fairfield (aunt)

Anthony West (4 August 1914 – 27 December 1987) was an English author and literary critic.

== Biography ==
West was born Anthony Panther West Fairfield, the son of British authors Rebecca West and H. G. Wells. His parents never married, as Wells was already married to Amy Catherine Robbins, and remained so until after his intimate relationship with West ended (although they remained friends until his death in 1946).

In 1955, Anthony West wrote a novel Heritage, which was technically fiction, but which dealt with the trials of a boy who grows up largely neglected and ignored by his famous parents. This work was a thinly disguised autobiography (a roman à clef). In it, his mother appeared much worse than his father, whom he admired all his life. She fell out with him over it, famously threatening to sue if the book was published in Britain. It was not published in Britain until 1984, after she had died. Similarly, Christopher Lehmann-Haupt wrote when reviewing West's biography of his father that it was "a book whose main purpose seems to be to even the score with anyone who has ever denigrated Mr. West's father", while his mother "is the ultimate target of his book".

A critically lauded author, he wrote novels, essays, and nonfiction works, and reviewed books for The New Yorker from the 1950s until the late 1970s. He won the Houghton Mifflin Award for his novel The Vintage (1949) (published in Britain as On a Dark Night), which Boucher and McComas praised as "a brilliantly terrifying exploration of the theme that each age creates its own peculiar species of hell and Devil". Besides the biography H. G. Wells: Aspects of a Life, he is also known for works on history such as Elizabethan England, and All About the Crusades.

In 1937, West married Katharine Church; the couple had one son (Edmund West) and one daughter (Caroline Frances West) but divorced in 1952. He later married Lily Emmet.

He died at home in Stonington, Connecticut at the age of 73 after suffering a stroke.

== Works ==
- On A Dark Night. London: Eyre & Spottiswoode. 1949. ASIN B0006F5IOM. Amazon
- The Vintage (Paperback ed.). Popular Library. 1949. ASIN B000FH7QKA. Amazon
- Another Kind. London: Eyre & Spottiswoode. 1951. Amazon
- Principles and Persuasions: the Literary Essays of Anthony West. Harcourt, Brace. 1957. ASIN B0007DU4TM. Amazon
- The Trend Is Up. New York: Random House. 1960. OCLC 367819. Amazon
- Elizabethan England. Odyssey Press. 1965. ASIN B0006BN6EK. Amazon
- Galsworthy Reader. Scribner. 1967. OCLC 729903. Textbook
- All About The Crusades. London: W. H. Allen. 1967. Illustrated by Carl Rose
- David Rees, Among Others. London: Hamilton. 1970. ISBN 0-241-01887-0.
- Mortal Wounds. New York: McGraw-Hill. 1973. ISBN 0-7069-4753-3. An examination of the dossiers of three noted 19th-century women, including Anne Louise Germaine de Staël, 1766–1817
- D. H. Lawrence. Norwood Editions. 1975. ISBN 0-88305-782-4.
- John Piper. London: Secker & Warburg. 1979.
- H. G. Wells: Aspects of a Life. New York: Random House. 1984. ISBN 0-394-53196-5. "The son of H. G. Wells and Rebecca West provides a biography of his father, chronicling the great English writer's rise to fame and fortune, his relationships with other famous people, and his numerous affairs".
- Heritage. London: Coronet. 1984. ISBN 0-340-36938-8. "Richard Savage, the illegitimate son of a famous British author and a prominent stage actress, faces the difficulties of growing up in boarding schools and living with one parent at a time".
