= The Return of the Soldier =

1918 book by Rebecca West

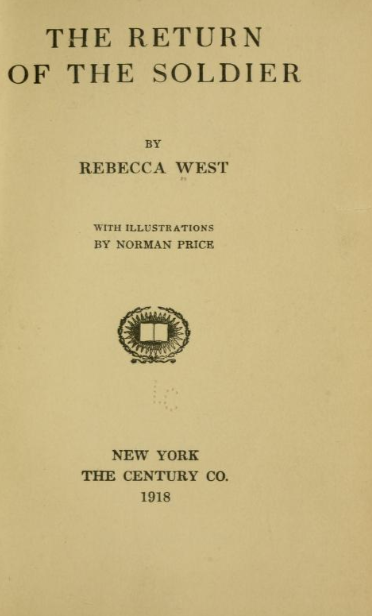
- Title page for The Return of the Soldier (1918)
- Author: Rebecca West
- Illustrator: Norman Price
- Language: English
- Genre: Psychological, war novel
- Publisher: The Century Company
- Publication date: 1918
- Publication place: United Kingdom
- Media type: Print (hardback and paperback)
- Pages: 185

The Return of the Soldier is the debut novel of English novelist Rebecca West, first published in 1918. The novel recounts the return of the shell shocked Captain Chris Baldry from the trenches of the World War I from the perspective of his cousin Jenny. The novel grapples with the soldier's return from the war with mental trauma and its effects on the family, as well as the light it sheds on their fraught relationships.

Though initially reviewed by critics, literary scholars treating West's work tended to focus on her later novels and dismissed The Return of the Soldier until the end of the twentieth century and beginning of the twenty-first. The novel was adapted into a film of the same name in 1982, and later into a stage musical of the same name in 2014 by Charles Miller.

== Background ==
The Return of the Soldier is not Rebecca's West's first novel, that was Henry James (1916). The Return of the Soldier was published in 1918 during World War I.

== Plot summary ==
The novel begins as the narrator, Jenny, describes her cousin by marriage, Kitty Baldry, pining in the abandoned nursery where her dead first son would have been raised. Occupied with the domestic management of the Baldry estate just outside London, the two are almost completely removed from the horrors of war. The only exception is that Kitty's husband, Chris Baldry, is a British soldier fighting in France. While Kitty laments in the nursery, Margaret Grey arrives at the estate bringing news to the two women. When Jenny and Kitty meet her, they are surprised to find a drab middle-aged woman. And even more to their shock, Margaret tells them that the War Office notified her of Chris's injury and return home, not Kitty and Jenny. Kitty dismisses Margaret from the estate trying to deny that she could have been the recipient of such information.

Soon after, another of Jenny's cousins notifies the two women that he in fact has visited Chris and that he is obsessing over Margaret, whom he had had a summer fling with 15 years before. Soon after, Chris returns shell-shocked to the estate believing he is still 20, but finding himself in a strange world which had aged 15 years beyond his memory. Trying to understand what is real for Chris, Jenny asks Chris to explain what he feels to be true. Chris tells her the story of a romantic summer on Monkey Island, where Chris at the age of 20 fell in love with Margaret, the inn-keeper's daughter. The summer ends with a rash departure by Chris in a fit of jealousy.

After Chris tells this story, Jenny travels to nearby Wealdstone to bring Margaret back to help Chris understand the difference between his remembered past and reality. She arrives at Margaret's dilapidated terraced house to find her dishevelled and taking care of her husband. Jenny persuades Margaret to return with her to the estate to help Chris. Upon Margaret's return, Chris recognises her and becomes excited. Before returning to her home, Margaret explains that 15 years have passed since their Monkey Island summer and that Chris is now married to Kitty. Chris acknowledges this passage of time intellectually but cannot retrieve his memories and still pines for Margaret.

Margaret continues to visit, and Jenny's initial dislike for the woman turns to friendship, gratitude, and eventually, near hero-worship as she realises that Margaret has an inner goodness that transcends her desperate appearance and class standing. Jenny recognises that the artifice of the house she and Kitty have so painstakingly decorated for Chris is a poor substitute for the love and temporary home he finds in Margaret. Jenny spends a lot of the time lamenting her inability to be part of this Chris-Margaret inner sanctum. She grieves the lost closeness with her cousin and expresses admiration for Margaret, Chris and their relationship.

Meanwhile, Kitty continues to despair about Chris's memory loss and his attachment to Margaret. Unlike Jenny, she refuses to speak with Margaret and does not respect the truth that this new/old relationship is doing Chris some good. Truthfully, the only time Chris is happy is when he is with Margaret. Kitty is not satisfied that he cannot be cured and one day announces the impending arrival of a Dr Gilbert Anderson, a psychoanalyst. Dr. Anderson, expected to take a novel tack, arrives during one of Margaret's visits and questions the women. Margaret perceptively recommends a course of treatment: Margaret must confront Chris with the existence of his late son, Oliver, who died at age two, five years ago. Margaret knows Chris will not be able to deny reality if he has to deny his child.

Jenny leads Margaret to the sad, well-maintained room where Oliver once lived. Margaret grieves for her own child whose death at the same age and time as Oliver's makes her feel a connection between the two. Amid this pain, Margaret and Jenny contemplate not "curing" Chris and instead letting him just be happy. But Jenny realises Chris will have no dignity if he has no truth and almost simultaneously, Margaret voices a similar thought.

The final scene of the book has Jenny watching from the house as Margaret confronts Chris with the truth of Oliver. Impatiently, Kitty wonders what is going on. Jenny recognises, even from a distance, that Chris's whole bearing has changed and he is no longer trapped in his youth. He is a soldier again, or as Kitty exclaims "He's cured!" Jenny's silence on the subject leads us to reflect on whether this cure is really a good thing after all. He will lose the love of his life and have to return to the horrors of the war, and, if he survives, the superficial life he has had with Kitty and Jenny.

== Characters ==
Chris Baldry is an upper class gentleman who chafes against the upper class expectations he is supposed to meet. According to critic Carl Rollyson, his amnesia reveals someone who has a suppressed "romantic sensibility". As Jenny comments in the book, he "was not like other city men"; he had a "great faith in the improbable". Throughout the novel, Chris is treated simply as the "soldier" and is often not given a full examination by Jenny as the narrator, thus his character is flat, an individual stuck in his masculine function in society.

Kitty Baldry on the other hand, is neoclassical in her outlook. Instead of the romantic optimism which Chris exhibits throughout the novel, Kitty's life revolves around the "proper forms" of an upperclass performance. Obsessed with self-control, good breeding, manners and making life tidy and comfortable, Kitty creates a facade of happiness which she projects on Baldry Court.

Margaret is a character cast in strong contrast with Kitty. A worn out lower-class woman, to whom the narrator Jenny is initially hostile, Margaret reveals herself as both thoughtful and aware, both revealing the illusions in Baldry Court to Jenny and supporting and expanding Dr. Anderson's analysis of Chris's psychological state.

Jenny is Kitty's cousin (through marriage), and is the narrator of the story.

== Style ==
West's style in her early novels, including The Return of the Soldier, is characteristic of other British Modernist novelists. She uses a limited point of view, a non-linear narration, and offers themes of memory, sexual desire and the importance of nuanced detail. Temporal displacement and uncertainty pervade most of the novel, especially in the way Chris's shell shock displaces him, and subsequently the reader, during his story telling. This additional shift beyond simply the period at war in France reinforces the idea that his trauma could be linked to his marriage with Kitty, or any number of other events. Additionally, Chris's sense of time is repeatedly broken throughout the novel and communicated through Jenny.

The limited unreliable narrator in The Return of the Soldier is Jenny, who is cousin to Chris, the soldier whom the title evokes. As the novel develops, Jenny's sympathies and attention shift from Kitty to Margaret. This dual focus on Kitty and Margaret make the novel more about the women and less about Chris, the title character.

== Themes ==
=== Soldier's return ===
The title The Return of the Soldier embodies a common trope in Great War literature: soldiers return from war and interact with everyday life, confronting trauma sustained through the brutality of war. The Return of the Soldier is the first deliberate evocation of the returned soldier in literature. West's treatment of the returning soldier in The Return of the Soldier is deliberately distanced from the war. The trauma Chris suffers in The Return of the Soldier becomes an isolated piece of evidence of the war's effect on a society that appears to be otherwise functioning normally. This distance is very similar to the distance from war and its trauma in Virginia Woolf's Jacob's Room.

The successful treatment of the traumatised returned soldier is a fundamental element of The Return of the Soldier. Unlike Virginia Woolf's Mrs Dalloway and Dorothy L. Sayers' The Unpleasantness at the Bellona Club, other postwar novels which emphasise the lingering effects of war despite attempts at reintegration, The Return of the Soldier lends a certain optimism that the soldier can be reintegrated into society. West's novel depicts war trauma as curable.

=== Psychoanalysis ===
Freudian psychoanalysis and its tools for understanding the psychological state of an individual are important to the novel. Freud and the idea of psychoanalysis were popular during the time when West was writing the novel, and the focus on psychoanalysis is fundamental to the conclusion of the book. In the conclusion, Chris is miraculously cured after his subconscious is first analysed and then confronted by the doctor and Margaret. Despite West's expressing in 1928 that the novel is not focused on psychoanalysis, critics have paid close attention to it, often criticising the simplicity of the psychoanalytic solution to Chris's traumatic amnesia. The rapidity of the recovery, and the failure of the reader to witness the conversation between Margaret and Chris are often cited by several critics, especially Wolfe, Orel, Gledhill and Sokoloff.

Literary scholars Cristina Pividori, Wyatt Bonikowski and Steve Pinkerton all seek to challenge the negative reception of the psychological tools in the novel. Bonikowski dissects the novel in light of the discussion of World War I proposed by Freud in Thoughts for the Times on War and Death and Beyond the Pleasure Principle and says that Freud and West came to similar conclusions on the effect of war on the human ego: that war shatter's the defence mechanisms which the ego has created to defend itself. Pividori argues that West has a more complex understanding of the human psyche than Freud does. Pividori argues that West doesn't believe that the soldier must relive the trauma to reconcile it within himself as Freud argues. In West's assessment of the situation, the soldier's desire to survive leads him to a search for love and life so that he may communicate the atrocities which he has witnessed. Pinkerton argues that the end of The Return of the Soldier points to Margaret as a character and individual who is extremely adept in analysing and in tune with Chris and that the actual event is plausible within current psychoanalytic theory. Pinkerton even goes so far as to suggest that the very nature of the trauma and kind of cure necessary to resolve Chris's trauma means that "The scene of Chris's cure, then cannot be written" because the resolution is simply unable to be described effectively.

== Critical reception ==
In May 1918, Lawrence Gilman reviewed The Return of the Soldier in the North American Review as "The Book of the Month". Amid his commentary on the elusiveness of any information about West from her or her publisher, Lawrence gave the book praise calling it "an authentic masterpiece, a one-act drama of [war] with music". In his review, he praised her language and ability to provide realist level detail. Additionally, he applauded West for treating a romantic subject without becoming sentimental.

Later literary critics neglected The Return of the Soldier until the end of the twentieth century and the beginning of the twenty-first. Earlier criticism was characterised by a negative response, often dismissing the novel on grounds of amateurishness of execution in both its style and use of thematic tools such as its use of Freudian psychoanalysis. The more recent critics have focused on the complexity of the novel, its expressing multiple themes, including feminist issues, the role of women in patriarchal society, war and trauma, and masculinity and war.

== Film, TV or theatrical adaptations ==
In 1928 it was adapted by the writer John Van Druten into a play of the same title which ran for 46 performances at the Playhouse Theatre in London's West End.

The novel was made into a 1982 film starring Alan Bates as Baldry and co-starring Julie Christie, Ian Holm, Glenda Jackson, and Ann-Margret.

In 2014 a musical adaptation premiered in London, with a book by Tim Sanders and composer by Charles Miller; it subsequently had runs in Manchester and Ipswich 4 years later.
