= Alice Low (suffragist) =

British suffragist

Alice Low OBE
- Born: 1877; Whitsome, Berwickshire
- Died: 1954 (aged 76–77)
- Organization: NUWSS QMAAC
- Known for: Suffragist, Senior Controller Queen Alexandra's Women's Army Corps, Public Speaker
- Movement: women's rights

Alice Low, OBE (1877–1954) was a British suffragist, who spoke up for peaceful means of achieving women's rights to vote, and fairer laws, including reducing sweated labour. She was a leader in Edinburgh and Berwickshire National Union of Women's Suffrage Societies (NUWSS) and a touring speaker (with Dr Elsie Inglis and Chrystal MacMillan, Millicent Fawcett and others) in the early twentieth century. She was also a lead member of Queen Mary's Army Auxiliary Corps. (QMAAC) in World War One (and continued its fellowship) and an amateur actress taking lead roles with the British Empire Shakespeare Society.

== Family ==
Alice Low was born in 1877 in Whitsome in Berwickshire. When she died in 1954, she was buried there. She had a sister, Jessica.

== Suffrage activism ==
The first evidence of Low's involvement with the campaign for women's suffrage was in July 1908 when her long letter on this topic was published in The Berwick Advertiser: She looked at countries where women had already been given the vote with no negative consequences; Low took some of the common arguments against women's suffrage (such as "a women's place is in the home ") and explained why she disagreed. And she invited readers to find out about the Edinburgh National Society for Women's Suffrage (to contact the secretary of the local branch), where pamphlets could be obtained and new members would be made welcome.

In the following month, she was engaged in speaking at the Berwickshire Women's Suffrage Society on the policy of the National Union of Women's Suffrage. The Berwick Advertiser quoted her as saying that "we admire the Suffragettes and fully realise how much the cause has been advanced by their efforts, but we preferred to follow peaceful means."

In September 1908, "with earnest enthusiasm", she spoke at a drawing-room meeting in Ninewells Mains on the unfairness to women of the current legal system, citing the divorce laws and legislation relating to wages as examples. Low highlighted issues in both factories and shops where women counter staff received rarely more than 10 or 11 shillings (around half of one £ sterling) a week. She noted that the consequence was that some were forced to earn by selling themselves as prostitutes. Summing up, Low had emphasised that 'now is the time to work and work tirelessly for the vote we must and shall have.'

On 7 October 1908, she was invited to speak at a public meeting in Edinburgh's Café Oak Hall by the Edinburgh National Society for Women's Suffrage, along with Lady Steel and Professor J A Paterson. The following day, Women's Franchise noted that with Low as the Secretary of the Berwickshire Branch of the NUWSS, it had "now a sufficient membership to manage its own affairs", (Low had been working for this branch from Edinburgh).

Both Low sisters spoke at a meeting in their home town of Whitsome In January 1909. Alice Low was the first speaker, receiving a "most enthusiastic" reception with applause throughout and being greeted by the singing of "For she's a jolly good fellow". She highlighted the challenges women faced, and the number of professions from which they were excluded.

She shared the platform with Dr Elsie Inglis and Chrystal MacMillan at another meeting of the Edinburgh NUWSS in the Café Oak Hall in February 1909. Low gave "a spirited address", encouraging men to support women in obtaining the vote. A guest speaker was Miss J A Scott from New Zealand, where women already had the vote;

Mrs Philip Snowden was the main speaker at a meeting in April 1909 in Duns Drill Hall with Mrs Kennedy Fraser and Alice Low. After the principal speech, Low took the opportunity to note that local branch membership of the suffrage society had increased from 40 members in August 1908 to 120 at the current time. A debate on the motion "That the franchise should be granted to duly qualified women, on the same terms as it is or may be granted to men" took place in Coldstream in April 1909. Low and Mrs Hope of Sunwick spoke in support of the motion, which was opposed by Mrs Neville (whose paper was read by her husband) and Lord Dunglass, the father of future Prime Minister Sir Alex Douglas-Home. The motion was carried by forty votes to ten, although there were many abstentions.

Low brought an "impenetrable array of arguments" against the Anti-Suffragists at a meeting in Swinton Manor in May 1909. Analysing the Anti-Suffragist Manifesto, she produced counter-arguments to each point.

In June, Low spoke in the Edinburgh Café on how men had gained the vote, and the connections between relevant legislation and the industries that employed women. Her sister Jessica spoke on how women had been treated in bygone days by primitive man.

Nearly 500 people at the Literary Institute in Mid Calder in July were an appreciative audience to hear Low, Dr Inglis, Miss Lees and Wilhelmina Lamond. In August 1909, Low joined the NUWSS Highland campaign on bicycles with Wilhelmina (Elizabeth) Lamond and Liza Gordon, speaking first in Kingussie, then Aviemore and Newtonmore. Low's description in Common Cause provides a good insight into the way they promoted meetings, using posters and chalking of pavements.

The tour continued to Pitlochry where they had a "disgraceful reception" according to the newspaper report. Despite interruptions, the singing of "Antonio" and other songs, Low and Lamond "pluckily" continued their speeches. The same month, Helen Fraser and Lisa Gordon joined Low and Lamond at a Ladies' meeting in Perth jointly organised by NUWSS and the Edinburgh Society for Women's Suffrage. The meeting took place indoors in the Guild Hall in the afternoon, with a further outdoor meeting in the evening.

In November 1909, Low was in Aberdeen, speaking at a meeting of the Aberdeen Women's Suffrage Association, which described itself as "Constitutional and Non-Militant" with Miss L J Lumsden and Miss Maule. Low focussed on the issue of the vote in the context of working women, looking at the social aspects affected by the current situation.

Low organised a jumble sale in aid of funds in Edinburgh in March 1910, which raised more than £15, with everything being sold. Fifteen pounds in 1910 would be the equivalent of approximately £1,800 at 2021 values.

Chrystal MacMillan and Low both spoke at a suffrage meeting in Falkirk in April 1910. Low again emphasised that the methods of the NUWSS were "absolutely law-abiding". She noted that the country's current problems were such that women demanded the right to help tackle these. In its edition of 28 April, The Common Cause noted that 19 new members joined at the Falkirk meeting, and another 5 had joined the next day.

For the April by-election in Edinburgh, Low was the Organiser for the NUWSS for the South Edinburgh seat. Low interviewed both of the candidates (Conservative and Liberal), neither of whom were in favour of women getting the vote.

Millicent Fawcett, the NUWSS leader, spoke at a meeting in Coldstream in September 1910. Her speech, which was reported at length, was received with loud applause. Low followed and in the words of the reporter made "a telling speech infused with humour", despite the subject being sweated labour. Low referred to the poem "The song of the shirt", and went on to say that she wanted laws which were "absolutely equal" between men and women.

Low's prominence led The Berwickshire News to include a profile of her (with photograph) in its "Women's work and interests" series on 4 April 1911. The article described her as possessing a "magnetic personality". It noted that she had had no suffrage involvement prior to 1908, and was now the organiser for the Edinburgh National Society covering Edinburgh, Leith and Midlothian. Her other voluntary roles were listed as serving on the Scottish Federation of Women's Suffrage Societies, on Whitsome School Board, on the Council of the Scottish Women's First Aid Corps, and as Berwickshire representative on the Council of the Athol Crescent School of Domestic Economy. Low was invited to speak at meetings that month in the north of England, including Hexham, Tynemouth and Newcastle.

However, she was soon back in Scotland, working with Chrystal MacMillan to stimulate the formation of a new branch. Their efforts were successful and a Bridge of Allan and Stirlingshire branch was inaugurated, Mrs Edmund Pullar was elected branch President. Low then spoke in Kirkcaldy at the local branch of the Scottish Federation of Women's Suffrage Societies. The local paper stated that she "demonstrated by practical examples the disadvantages" that women faced, and stated her opposition to militant tactics.

"Pithead Female Labour" was the title of a letter by Low published in The Scotsman in October 1911. It concerned a motion passed by the Miners' Federation Conference which would preclude the employment of women and girls at pitheads. Low made a number of arguments as to why females should continue to carry out this work.

In January 1912 East Edinburgh by-election, Low took a "leading role" in campaigning. In reporting her speech outside Younger's Brewery, the Dundee Courier published a photo of Low as an inset to one of the Liberal candidate (Mr Hogge).

Low spoke in Linlithgow in May 1912 again at a meeting to establish another local branch. Low's speech raised concerns about legislation on work having a negative impact on women. Sufficient attendees expressed an interest that a new branch was formed. Two Open Air meetings in Bo'ness in June had Low as speaker with Lisa Gordon, and again with her in Linlithgow, and Low herself spoke in Eskbank, and with Miss W P Scott in Balerno.

Low's "well earned" holiday in September was interrupted by the announcement of a by-election in Midlothian.

"Dressed in black with a small seal hat trimmed with a blue feather" was the attire of Low when she was at the opening of a Suffragist "Fancy Fair" (bazaar) In St Cuthbert's Hall, Edinburgh later in the year. Dr Inglis also attended; she was dressed in black velvet. The event was opened by the Member of Parliament for Central Edinburgh, Charles Price.

Writing about Low speaking in Bathgate in November, the West Lothian Courier noted that the NUWSS had over 400 branches throughout the UK, with a membership of more than 35,000 annual subscribers.

Low was in the chair for a meeting for working women in December 1912, with Mrs Despard, founder of the Women's Freedom League, as key speaker. This was just a few days after Low had spoken on the theme of "Don't be pessimistic" in connection with the Reform Bill then going through Parliament.

Muriel Matters from Australia was a joint speaker with Low in Addiewell in January 1913, explaining why women should have the vote, as they did in her country. Low shared her concerns about the sweated workers of Glasgow, some of whom were only receiving one penny (a 240th of £1) per hour. Low called the tactics of the militants "deplorable" when she was in the chair at an NUWSS meeting in Edinburgh in February 1913. She reminded the audience that NUWSS was a separate organisation, and militants were only a small part of the whole movement to secure votes for women.

On 3 March 1913, the Manchester Daily Citizen listed a number of suffragists who had come to Houghton during the parliamentary election. Low was there with Alice Crompton, Muriel Matters and Annot Robinson; it reported that their meetings were "crowded to the doors." Low was speaking that month at meetings in Morpeth, Durham, Jarrow, Monksheaton and Bishop Auckland. Then at Newcastle where her fellow speakers were Miss C M Gordon and the Viscountess Howick.

At Hyde Park in July during the demonstration which was the culmination of the suffragists' walk to London, Chrystal MacMillan introduced Low as speaker on one of the two Scottish stands; on the other, Lisa Gordon presided with the speakers being Alice Crompton and Miss Pressley Smith.

At the AGM of the Leven Suffrage Society in October, Low gave an "eloquent address" on the present situation of the suffrage movement, and the future policy of the NUWSS. The West Lothian by-election occupied Low in late October and early November; she received a "splendid hearing" and "advanced the cause considerably" at a meeting in the village of Fauldhouse. The Common Cause noted that Low was the organiser in charge for the election. Low also engaged in a public debate "Should Militant Methods be employed in the Agitation for Votes for Women" when Muriel Scott spoke in favour of the motion, and Low was against.

A photo and brief biography of Low appeared in The Gentlewoman in January 1914. It states that she is "versatile" and lists her international hockey career, her position on the Whitsome School Board, her active participation in amateur dramatics and that she held a position on the executive committee of the Scottish Council for Women's Trades.

Low was also reported in January 1914 as having spoken about the Feminist Movement from an international perspective, highlighting improvements in conditions as geographically separate as Germany, India, Australia and New Zealand, noting the positive effect everywhere women had obtained the franchise. The subject of a talk in Alloa that Low gave in March of the same year was "How women's suffrage will benefit the state". Later the same month, Low spoke in Newington on "Why women wanted the vote."

== Dramatic and sporting roles ==
In 1900, Low acted in a farce called The Mouse trap and a duologue called Jerry and the sunbeam in aid of a patriotic fund for Scottish soldiers at a Thé and Café Chantant in the Music Hall, Edinburgh.

In 1903, she was an Honorary Member of the Berwickshire Naturalists' Club.

In the same year, Low was active in sport, captaining the West of Edinburgh Ladies Hockey Team playing away to Berwick. Low also played International Hockey for Scotland against England.

In February the following year, Low performed in Shakespeare's Love's Labour's Lost in the Queen's Hall Edinburgh, in aid of the building fund for Queen Alexandra's Home for Officers' Widows and Daughters. In the same month she played the lead part of Puck in A Midsummer Night's Dream in St Cuthbert's Hall, Edinburgh. According to The Scotsman, Low showed "dramatic and elocutionary ability of no mean order". The production was by the British Empire Shakespearean Society, which had been founded three years previously (1901). Its goals included "to promote greater familiarity with Shakespeare's work among all classes throughout the British Empire" and "to help the rising generation not only to study Shakespeare's works, but to love them."

In December 1904, Low was back in the Queen's Hall in a "comedietta" entitled Mrs Hilary regrets. The reviewer noted that she performed the lead role "with ability". This was part of a dramatic and musical event staged to support the Scottish Anti-Vivisection Society. Low continued to act in a variety of plays, often in aid of charitable causes: in 1906 she appeared in A Winter's Tale in the Queen's Hall in aid of the Soldiers' and Sailors' Help Society. On this occasion, Low's sister Jessica took one of the main roles. Low took the lead role herself in the December 1906 British Empire Shakespearean Society (Edinburgh Branch) production of Love's Labour Lost: she was described as performing the part of Viola "very charmingly".

Low was in Stratford on Avon in 1907, with the British Empire Shakespearean Society as an "excellent Jessica" in The Merchant of Venice.

=== Wartime experiences and work ===
In July 1914, Low was on a holiday in Germany with Lisa Gordon, the Organising Secretary of the NUWSS. Their trip had started from Edinburgh on 30 July, only a few days before the start of the Great War. On her return, Low spoke about her experiences; for example in October, The Berwickshire News described how Low and Gordon had witnessed the frantic excitement of the local populace during their journey to their destination of Wildbad, yet they found the town "absolutely empty" on arriving there, which was due to people fleeing and army mobilisation. The pair were still there after the declaration of war by Great Britain, when the local police gave them a permit to go to Stuttgart. The pair refrained from conversing in English as "spy fever" raged, according to the newspaper sub-heading. A train, on which they met kindness from soldiers and civilians, took them to the Swiss border, and from Switzerland they had a long trip back to the UK.

It was not long after her return that Low was invited to become the NUWSS's representative on Edinburgh's Relief Committee on 25 August 1914.

Later in the year, Low became a member of the Edinburgh Sub-Committee of the Scottish Committee on Women's Employment; alongside Alexia B Jack and Nannie Brown. In December she was appointed Secretary. The Scotsman reported that sixty-nine girls were now being employed in different workrooms through this group. The Gentlewomen listed Low's attendance at Lady Linlithgow's formal opening of the Melville Street workroom where old clothes were refashioned into garments for children. Similar work was done for soldiers, financed by the "Queen's Work for Women" Scheme. Lady Aberdeen visited the premises in Hope Park Terrace (The Women's Emergency Committee Workroom) in the following February; she was received by the House Committee, who were Low herself, Mrs T J Millar and Mrs Mclennan. The fifty-five women there were engaged variously in garment work, cookery and home nursing.

During 1915, Low spoke at recruiting meetings-in connection with the Women's Patriotic Service League and the Rosebery Royal Scots Recruiting Committee; her co-speakers were Elizabeth Finlayson Gauld and Miss Lumsden.

After the execution of Edith Cavell, Low's recruiting appeal on Castle Street, Edinburgh in October 1915 was called an "eloquent address", as she entreated her audience to show the same self-sacrifice.

==== Role in supporting women's war efforts ====
In November 1915, the Secretary of State for Scotland appointed Low as an additional member of the Enquiry into women's clerical and secretarial work, to suggest they take employment which would enable men to be released for the armed forces.

Women's work continued to be a theme for Low as she focussed on the new opportunities that had been opened to women since the start of the war, in areas as diverse as engineering, technical and clerical; although she criticised the low pay being paid by the Treasury to women in clerical roles. Low wrote a detailed article for The Common Cause on the contribution from those in the women's suffrage movement, and the advances they had made in encouraging the employment of women in areas such as agriculture and gardening, as tram drivers and ticket collectors, as well as a more direct contribution to war work. Low also claimed that women were now preferred to men in banks and insurance offices. She concluded that in these circumstances, women should "waste no opportunity to state their case" (for suffrage).

Low spoke to an audience of 1000 in a park in Newtongrange in July 1916. A sum of thirteen guineas was collected in aid of the Scottish Women's Foreign Hospital Fund after which the crowd was entertained by the local Silver Band and other performers. Later that year, she presented a lantern lecture in Edinburgh on the same subject. Low collected money in Edinburgh from the Edith Cavell X-Ray Car tour, noting that over thirty pounds had been raised from admissions, donations and the sale of postcards. The Common Cause reported that the Unit had been presented to the Scottish Women's Hospital by the citizens of Glasgow, and gave a list of places where visitors could see the X-Ray apparatus being demonstrated.

In a June 1917 newspaper item on a Women's Hospital Flag Day in the Edinburgh area, the reporter notes that Low had visited the Abbeye de Royaumont hospital near the Front the previous September, and that she had been particularly impressed with the way in which gas gangrene injuries had been treated. In December 1916, Low spoke to a Miners' Meeting in Broxburn in order to raise funds for the Scottish Women's Hospital. She spent some time describing the retreat of the women hospital staff along with the Serbian Army, noting with emphasis that the first thing the women did on their return – and despite "terrible suffering" – was to offer their services again. A unanimous vote of the miners agreed to contribute a portion of their weekly wages during the whole month.

Low was given an important assignment in France in the summer of 1917 as Area Controller for the Women's Auxiliary Army Corps. Her duties are detailed in the War Dairies of Queen Mary's Army Auxiliary Corps. In Havre in February 1918, for example, these included inspecting hostels, kitchens, dining rooms and the site of a proposed disinfector. On the 19th, she visited four exchanges, and noted that there was no coal for heating at the docks office; at other sites she commended work done or highlighted improvements needed. On the 28th, she accompanied Lady Baden Powell on a tour of inspection.

In September 1918, Low was in a recruiting meeting in Perth, having just returned from her post in France (the Women's Auxiliary Army Corps had been renamed Queen Mary's Army Auxiliary Corps.(QMAAC)), Low emphasised the dances, concert parties and excursions that took place to raise morale, rather than the military work the women undertook, which was covered by Dr Letitia Fairfield of the WRAF and Mrs McRae of the WRNS.

=== Honour awarded ===
In December 1919 Low was invested with the OBE by Prince Arthur of Connaught, in Holyrood Palace's Throne Room which was "crowded to overflowing". The Gentlewoman noted Low's service in connection with the Women's Patriotic Service League as well as the QMAAC.

=== Post war activities ===
Low is less prominent in press reports after the war, although The Scotsman in April 1920 notes that she is the Organising Secretary of the West of Edinburgh Unionist Association at an entertainment in the Tivoli Theatre, Edinburgh, with the local MP as keynote speaker. "'Old Comrades' of the QMAAC" is the title of an article in The Gentlewoman in May 1920, and Low is reported as welcoming eighty former members of the organisation, including fellow medal winners.

Low was Chair of the QMAAC Old Comrades Club (Edinburgh Branch) in the 1920s and her connection with the Club lasted until the 1940s. A joint annual reunion meeting in 1933, with former members of the WRAF, WRENS and Women's Legion; an "Armistice Reunion" took place in the preceding year; and a talk by Low to members present in 1935 noted that many now had grey hairs (although another member claimed they were "wearing well."). The lengthy newspaper report noted gave an account of the memories and reminiscences shared by those attending, one woman was noted as having been mentioned during the reunion (Dr Adeline Campbell) "because she was kind".

The Edinburgh Evening News on WAAC's Silver Jubilee day, gave a detailed report of its formation in 1917. It listed the varied types of work that were carried out by the women and the appearance of their uniform. QMAAC's activities in the Second World War, and the canteen that had been set up in its Edinburgh premises for contemporary members of the women's services, were described. And Low herself was reported as "still taking a prominent part in the useful work of the club".

In 1946, Low was among those reported as being presented to Princess Elizabeth (now Queen Elizabeth II) during a Royal visit to the Edinburgh premises of the Club (now the United Servicewomen's Club). The Princess spoke to a number of those long associated with the club, and toured its facilities.

Low died in 1954.
