= Brian Hall (author) =

American author (born 1959)

- Born: August 31, 1959 (age 67)
- Education: Harvard University (AB)
- Occupation: Author
- Children: 2

Brian Hall (born August 31, 1959) is an American author.

== Education ==
He attended Harvard University from 1977 to 1981, graduating summa cum laude with an A.B. in English Literature.

== Career ==
From 1982 to 1984, Hall cycled through western and eastern Europe, camping out most of the time. Based on his experiences in Eastern Europe, Hall wrote his first book, Stealing From a Deep Place (published by Hill and Wang, 1988), which was shortlisted for the Thomas Cook Travel Book Award.

His first novel, The Dreamers (Harper and Row, 1989), tells the story of an American graduate student studying the Anschluss in Vienna, who gets into a rather tortured affair with an Austrian woman and her young, fatherless son.

Hall's other novels include The Saskiad (Houghton-Mifflin, 1997); I Should Be Extremely Happy In Your Company (Viking, 2003); and Fall of Frost (Viking, 2008). The Saskiad, a coming-of-age novel about a precocious and imaginative young girl, has been translated into 12 languages. I Should Be Extremely Happy In Your Company was named one of the best novels of the year by The Boston Globe, Salon magazine, the Los Angeles Times, and The Christian Science Monitor. Fall of Frost was named one of the best novels of the year by The Boston Globe and The Washington Post.

Additional nonfiction works by Hall include: The Impossible Country: A Journey Through the Last Days of Yugoslavia (Godine, 1994) and Madeleine's World: A Biography of a Three-Year-Old (Houghton-Mifflin, 1997). For The Impossible Country, Hall learned Serbo-Croatian, and traveled several times to Yugoslavia over a three-year period, from 1989 to 1991. Madeleine's World is a novelist's take on the ideas of Jean Piaget, the Swiss developmental psychologist who based many of his theories on observations of his own children. Hall, by watching his own daughter's development over three years, wrote a book speculating on what the growth of human consciousness might look like from the inside. In 2019, Madeleine's World was ranked by Slate as one of the 50 greatest nonfiction works of the past 25 years.

He has written for publications such as The New York Times Magazine and The New Yorker, though since 1997, he has dedicated himself exclusively to writing books.

== Bibliography ==
=== Novels ===
- The Dreamers (Harper and Row, 1989)
- The Saskiad (Houghton-Mifflin, 1997)
- I Should Be Extremely Happy In Your Company (Viking, 2003)
- Fall of Frost (Viking, 2008)
- The Stone Loves the World (Viking, 2021)

=== Non-fiction ===
- Stealing From a Deep Place (Hill and Wang, 1988)
- The Impossible Country: A Journey Through the Last Days of Yugoslavia (Godine, 1994)
- Madeleine's World: A Biography of a Three-Year-Old (Houghton-Mifflin, 1997)

== Personal life ==
Son of Louis Alton Hall and Peggy Smith Hall, Hall grew up in Lexington, Massachusetts. He lives in Ithaca, New York. In addition to being an author, he is also an amateur pianist and cellist. He has two daughters, Madeleine and Cora.
