= Victoria Hospital for Children =

Tite Street Children's Hospital
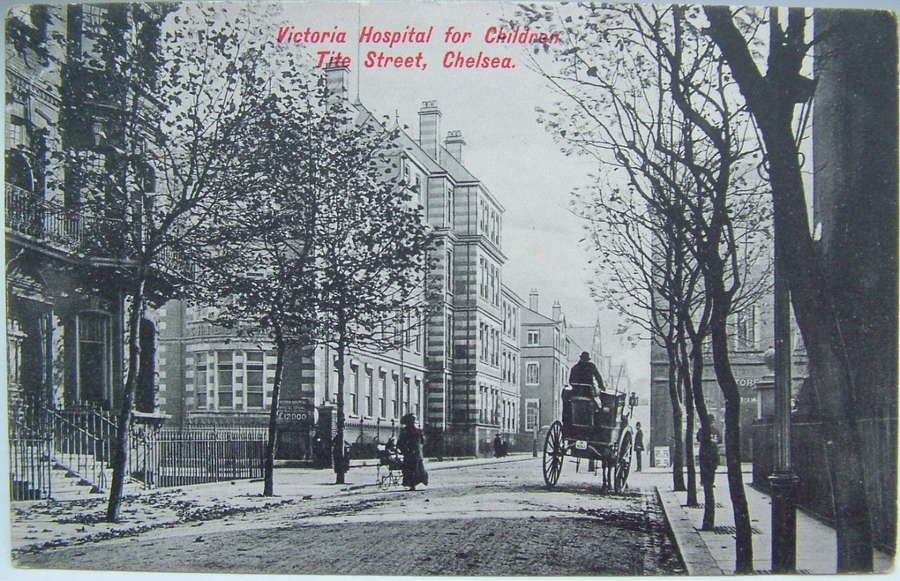
- Victoria Hospital for Children in Tite Street

- Location in Kensington and Chelsea

Geography
- Location: London; United Kingdom
- Coordinates: 51.4859°N 0.1629°W

Organisation
- Care system: NHS England

Services
- Emergency department: No

History
- Founded: 1866
- Closed: 1964

The Victoria Hospital for Children, which later merged into St George's Hospital, was a hospital in Tite Street, London.

== History ==
The hospital was established at Gough House in Tite Street in October 1866. Gough House had been built c1710 by John Vaughan, 3rd Earl of Carbery and later sold to Sir Richard Gough, after whom it was named.

Originally known as the South Western London Hospital for Children, it was renamed the Victoria Hospital for Sick Children a month later when the out-patients department opened: and then became the Victoria Hospital for Children in 1905. It joined the National Health Service in 1948 under the management of St George's Hospital. After services were transferred to St George's Hospital, it closed in 1964. The building was demolished in 1966. The site is now occupied by St Wilfrid's Convent and Home.
