= Milan Ristović =

Serbian historian

Milan Ristovic (Serbian: Milan Ristović or Милан Ристовић) is a Serbian historian and university professor.

Ristovic was born in 1953 in Pristina, Kosovo, then SFRY. He graduated from the department of Contemporary History, University of Belgrade Faculty of Philosophy. In 1981 he was awarded his master's degree and in 1991 he completed his PhD studies at the same faculty. From 1978 to 1989 he worked as an assistant at the Institute for Contemporary History in Belgrade. In 1990, he joined the Department of History, Faculty of History. In 1991 he was given the title of assistant professor. In 1998 he was elected associate professor and in 2001, he was appointed as full professor. His main field of research is European and Southeast European History in the 20th century with regional specialization in Germany, Great Britain and Austria.

He has been working as the chief editor of the "Godišnjak za društvenu istoriju" (Annual Social History Journal) since 1994 and he is the head of the Society for Social History since 1998.

== References and notes ==
- Milan Ristović on shoa.de
- Milan Ristović on Institute for Balkan Studies, Salonica
