= Rebecca West =

British author and journalist (1892–1983)

Dame Rebecca West DBE
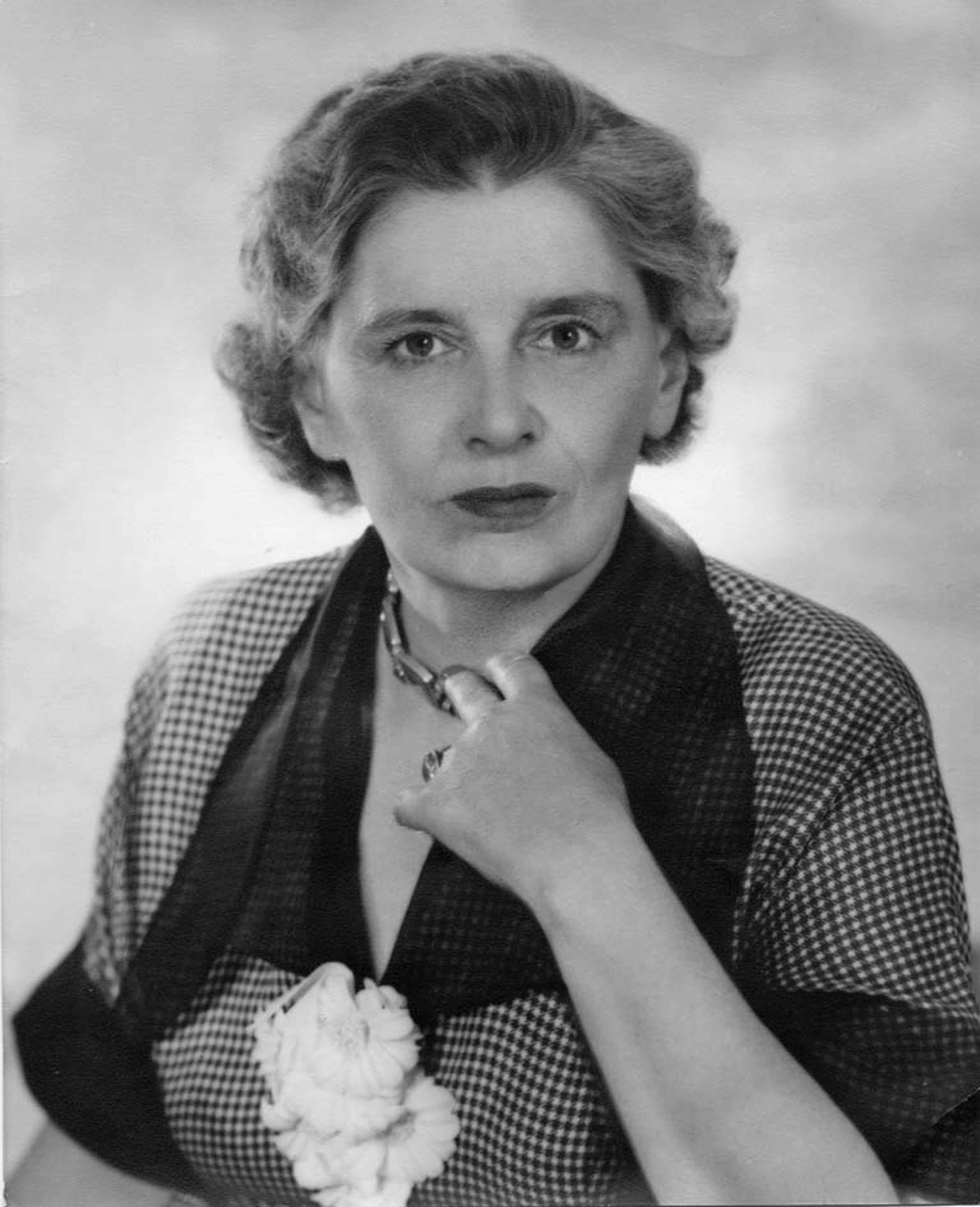
- Portrait of West by Madame Yevonde
- Born: Cecily Isabel Fairfield; 21 December 1892; London, England
- Died: 15 March 1983 (aged 90); London, England
- Occupation: Writer
- Children: Anthony West
- Relatives: Letitia Fairfield (sister)

Dame Cecily Isabel Fairfield (21 December 1892 – 15 March 1983), known as Rebecca West, or Dame Rebecca West, was a British author, journalist, literary critic and travel writer. An author who wrote in many genres, West reviewed books for The Times, the New York Herald Tribune, The Sunday Telegraph and The New Republic, and she was a correspondent for The Bookman.

Her major works include Black Lamb and Grey Falcon (1941), on the history and culture of Yugoslavia; A Train of Powder (1955), her coverage of the Nuremberg trials, published originally in The New Yorker; The Meaning of Treason (first published as a magazine article in 1945 and then expanded to the book in 1947), later The New Meaning of Treason (1964), a study of the trial of American-born fascist William Joyce and others; The Return of the Soldier (1918), a modernist World War I novel; and the "Aubrey trilogy" of autobiographical novels, The Fountain Overflows (1956), This Real Night (published posthumously in 1984), and Cousin Rosamund (1985).

Time called her "indisputably the world's number one woman writer" in 1947. She was made CBE in 1949, and DBE in 1959; in each case, the citation reads: "writer and literary critic". She took the pseudonym "Rebecca West" from the rebellious young heroine in Rosmersholm by Henrik Ibsen. She was a recipient of the Benson Medal in 1966.

== Biography ==
Rebecca West was born Cecily Isabel Fairfield in 1892 in London, England, and grew up in a home full of intellectual stimulation, political debate, lively company, books and music. Her mother, Isabella, a Scotswoman, was an accomplished pianist but did not pursue a musical career after her marriage to Charles Fairfield. The Anglo-Irish Charles had been a Confederate stretcher-bearer at the siege of Richmond in the US Civil War, and had returned to the UK to become a journalist of considerable reputation but financial incompetence. He deserted his family when Cecily was eight years old. He never rejoined them, and died impoverished and alone in a boarding house in Liverpool in 1906, when Cecily was 14. The rest of the family moved to Edinburgh, Scotland, where Cecily was educated at George Watson's Ladies College. She had to leave school in 1907 due to a bout of tuberculosis. She chose not to return after recovering from the illness, later describing her schooling at Watson's as akin to a "prison".

West had two older sisters. Letitia ("Lettie"), who was the best educated of the three, became one of the first fully qualified female doctors in Britain, as well as a barrister at the Inns of Court. Winifred ("Winnie"), the middle sister, married Norman Macleod, Principal Assistant Secretary in the Admiralty, and eventually director general of Greenwich Hospital. Winnie's two children, Alison and Norman, became closely involved in Rebecca's life as she got older; Alison Macleod would achieve a literary career of her own. West trained as an actress in London, taking the name "Rebecca West" from the rebellious young heroine in Rosmersholm by Henrik Ibsen. She and Lettie became involved in the women's suffrage movement, participating in street protests. Meanwhile, West worked as a journalist for the feminist weekly Freewoman and the Clarion, drumming up support for the suffragette cause.

=== Affairs and motherhood ===
In September 1912, West accused the famously libertine writer H. G. Wells of being "the Old Maid among novelists." This was part of a provocative review of his novel Marriage published in Freewoman, an obscure and short-lived feminist weekly review. The review attracted Wells's interest and an invitation to lunch at his home. The two writers became lovers in late 1913, despite Wells being both married and 26 years older than West. Their 10-year relationship produced a son, Anthony West, born on 4 August 1914. Wells was behind her move to Marine Parade, Leigh-on-Sea in Essex, where she lived between 1917 and 1919. Their friendship lasted until Wells's death in 1946.

West is also said to have had relationships with Charlie Chaplin, newspaper magnate Lord Beaverbrook, and journalist John Gunther.

=== Early career and marriage ===
West established her reputation as a spokeswoman for feminist and socialist causes and as a critic, turning out essays and reviews for The New Republic, New York Herald Tribune, New York American, New Statesman, The Daily Telegraph, and many more newspapers and magazines. George Bernard Shaw said in 1916 that "Rebecca West could handle a pen as brilliantly as ever I could and much more savagely." During the 1920s, West began a lifelong habit of visits to the United States to give lectures, meet artists, and get involved in the political scene. She was a great friend of the novelist G. B. Stern, and Stern and Clemence Dane stayed with her in America in 1924. There, she befriended CIA founder Allen Dulles, Charlie Chaplin, Harold Ross of The New Yorker, and historian Arthur Schlesinger Jr., among many other significant figures of the day. Her lifelong fascination with the United States culminated in 1948 when President Truman presented her with the Women's Press Club Award for Journalism, calling her "the world's best reporter."

In 1930, at the age of 37, she married a banker, Henry Maxwell Andrews, and they remained nominally together, despite one public affair just before his death in 1968. West's writing brought her considerable wealth, and, by 1940, she owned a Rolls-Royce and a grand country estate, Ibstone House, in the Chiltern Hills of southern England. During World War II, West housed Yugoslav refugees in the spare rooms of her blacked-out manor, and she used the grounds as a small dairy farm and vegetable plot, agricultural pursuits that continued long after the war had ended.

=== Later life ===
As West grew older, she turned to broader political and social issues, including humanity's propensity to inflict violent injustice on itself. Before and during World War II, West travelled widely, collecting material for books on travel and politics. In 1936–38, she made three trips to Yugoslavia, a country she came to love, seeing it as the nexus of European history since the late Middle Ages. Her non-fiction masterpiece, Black Lamb and Grey Falcon is an amalgamation of her impressions from these trips. New York Times reviewer Katherine Woods wrote: "In two almost incredibly full-packed volumes one of the most gifted and searching of modern English novelists and critics has produced not only the magnification and intensification of the travel book form, but, one may say, its apotheosis."

West was assigned by Ross's magazine to cover the Nuremberg trials for The New Yorker, an experience she memorialized in the book A Train of Powder. In 1950, she was elected a Foreign Honorary Member of the American Academy of Arts and Sciences. She also went to South Africa in 1960 to report on apartheid in a series of articles for The Sunday Times, particularly regarding a prominent trial for a seditious uprising aiming to establish Communist rule.

West was a close friend of Vyvyan Holland, son of Oscar Wilde. When the Holland family was facing bankruptcy in the 1950s, she stepped in to pay for the Eton tuition of Wilde's grandson, Merlin Holland.

She accidentally misidentified a South African judge for some questions put by another judge and was sued for libel along with the Sunday Times whose editor, Harry Hodson, failed to support West. She wrote "My problem is complicated by the fact that the defence, the people who would naturally be against the Judge and for me, are mostly Communist and won't lift a finger for me. It worries me a lot. It's so hard to work with this hanging over me." She felt her only support came from her friends, the anti-apartheid politician Bernard Friedman and his wife, with whom she stayed in Johannesburg. "I will get over this case. But it isn't easy to feel that some people are for no reason that you know of possessed by an intention to ruin you; and I also felt I was letting you down in South Africa. I have been deeply grateful for all the kindness and sympathy you have shown me and I thought of Tall Trees as a warm place in a chilly world."

She travelled extensively well into old age. In 1966 and 1969, she undertook two long journeys to Mexico, becoming fascinated by the indigenous culture of the country and its mestizo population. She stayed with actor Romney Brent in Mexico City and with Katherine (Kit) Wright, a long-time friend, in Cuernavaca.

=== Old age ===
Her husband became both sleepy and inattentive as he got older. The sleepiness led to a car accident where no one was hurt but Henry was charged with dangerous driving. He became obsessed with the Norwegian ballerina Gerd Larsen; he would refuse to travel with West, instead preferring to return to London to be with Larsen. West initially considered this to be purely her husband's infatuation, but came to think that Larsen was driven by money. At her husband's funeral West had the upsetting problem of Larsen's request to be among the mourners, even though she had only known him for 18 months. Henry's will left £5,000 for Larsen. After her husband's death in 1968, West discovered that he had been unfaithful with other women.

After she was widowed, she moved to London, where she bought a spacious apartment overlooking Hyde Park. Unfortunately, it was next door to the Iranian Embassy. During the May 1980 incident, West, then 87, had to be evacuated.

In the last two decades of her life, West kept up a very active social life, making friends with Martha Gellhorn, Doris Lessing, Bernard Levin, comedian Frankie Howerd, and film star and director Warren Beatty, who filmed her for the production Reds, a biography of journalist John Reed and his connection with the Russian Revolution. She also spent time with scholars such as Jane Marcus and Bonnie Kime Scott, who began to chronicle her feminist career and varied work. She wrote at an unabated pace, penning masterful reviews for The Sunday Telegraph, publishing her last novel The Birds Fall Down (1966), and overseeing the film version of the story by BBC in 1978. The last work published in her lifetime was 1900 (1982). 1900 explored the last year of Queen Victoria's long reign, which was a watershed in many cultural and political respects.

At the same time, West worked on sequels to her autobiographically inspired novel The Fountain Overflows (1957); although she had written the equivalent of two more novels for the planned trilogy, she was never satisfied with the sequels and did not publish them. She also tinkered at great length with an autobiography, without coming to closure, and started scores of stories without finishing them. Much of her work from the late phase of her life was published posthumously, including Family Memories (1987), This Real Night (1984), Cousin Rosamund (1985), The Only Poet (1992), and Survivors in Mexico (2003). Unfinished works from her early period, notably Sunflower (1986) and The Sentinel (2001) were also published after her death, so that her oeuvre was augmented by about one third by posthumous publications.

=== Relationship with her son ===
West's relationship with her son, Anthony West, was not a happy one. The rancour between them came to a head when Anthony, himself a gifted writer, his father's biographer (H. G. Wells: Aspects of a Life [1984]), and a novelist, published Heritage (1955), a fictionalised autobiography. West never forgave her son for depicting in Heritage the relationship between an illegitimate son and his two world-famous, unmarried parents, and for portraying the mother in unflattering terms. The depiction of West's alter ego in Heritage as a deceitful, unloving actress (West had trained as an actress in her youth) and poor caregiver so wounded West that she broke off relations with her son and threatened to sue any publisher who would bring out Heritage in England. She suppressed an English edition of the novel, which was only published there after her death, in 1984. Although there were temporary rapprochements between her and Anthony, a state of alienation persisted between them, causing West grief until her dying hour. She fretted about her son's absence from her deathbed, but when asked whether he should be sent for, answered: "perhaps not, if he hates me so much."

=== Death ===
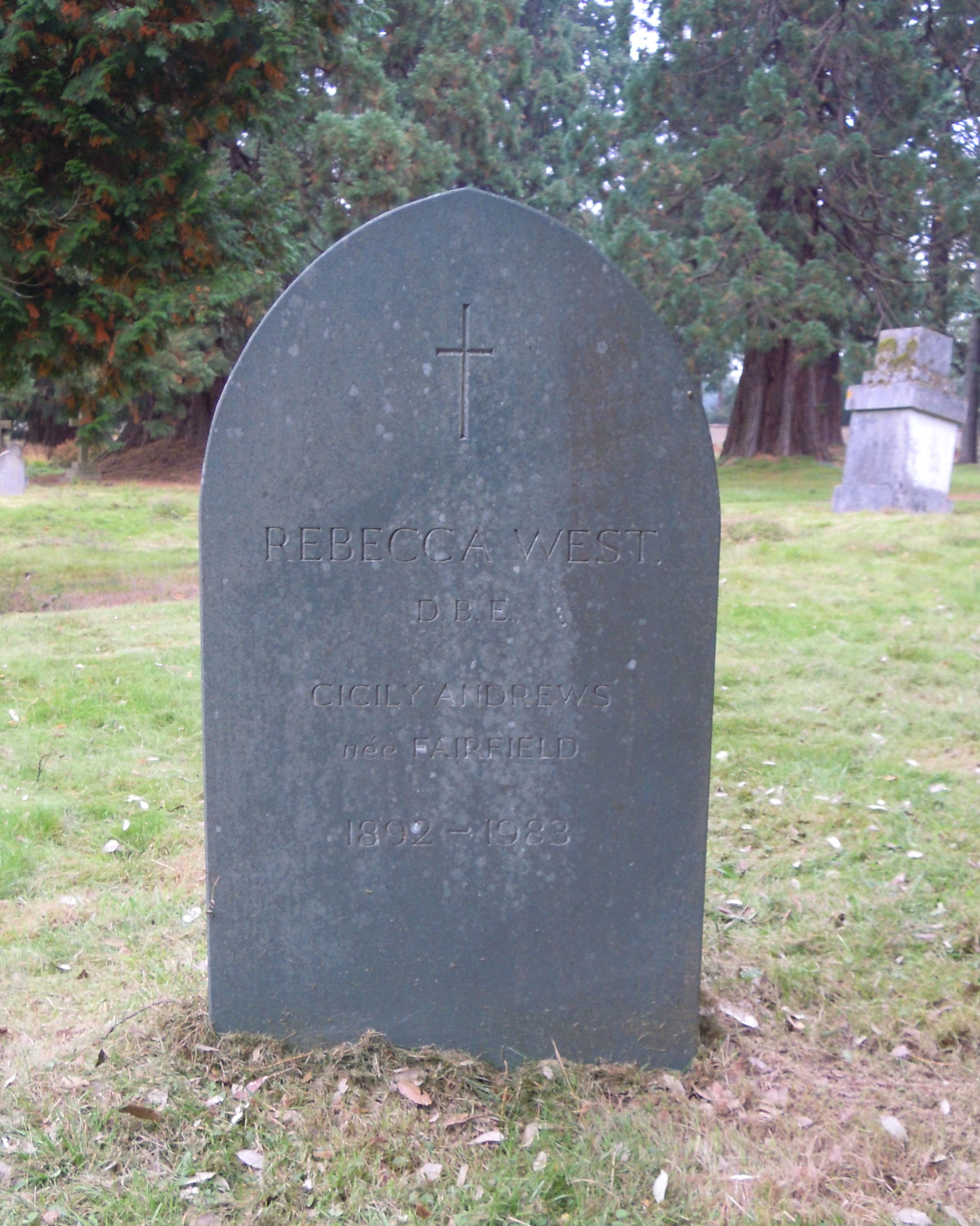
West's grave in Brookwood Cemetery

West suffered from failing eyesight and high blood pressure in the late 1970s, and became increasingly frail. Her last months were mostly spent in bed, at times delirious and other times lucid; she complained that she was dying too slowly. She died on 15 March 1983, and is buried at Brookwood Cemetery, Woking.

Upon hearing of her death, William Shawn, then editor in chief of The New Yorker, said:

Rebecca West was one of the giants and will have a lasting place in English literature. No one in this century wrote more dazzling prose, or had more wit, or looked at the intricacies of human character and the ways of the world more intelligently.

She is honoured with a blue plaque at Hope Park Square, Edinburgh, her childhood home which also provided the setting for her novel The Judge.

== Politics ==
West grew up in a home filled with discussions of world affairs. Her father was a journalist who often involved himself in controversial issues. He brought home Russian revolutionaries and other political activists, and their debates helped to form West's sensibility, which took shape in novels such as The Birds Fall Down, set in pre-revolution Russia. But the crucial event that moulded West's politics was the Dreyfus affair. The impressionable Rebecca learned early on just how powerful was the will to persecute minorities and to subject individuals to unreasonable suspicion based on flimsy evidence and mass frenzy. West had a keen understanding of the psychology of politics, how movements and causes could sustain themselves on the profound need to believe or disbelieve in a core of values—even in contradiction of reality.

Although she was a militant feminist and active suffragette, and published a perceptive and admiring profile of Emmeline Pankhurst, West also criticised the tactics of Pankhurst's daughter, Christabel, and the sometimes doctrinaire aspects of the Pankhursts' Women's Social and Political Union (WSPU).

The first major test of West's political outlook was the Bolshevik Revolution. Many on the left saw it as the beginning of a new, better world, and the end of the crimes of capitalism. West regarded herself as a member of the left, having attended Fabian socialist summer schools as a girl. Yet to West, both the Revolution and the revolutionaries were suspect. Even before the Bolsheviks took power in October 1917, West expressed her doubts that events in Russia could serve as a model for socialists in Britain or anywhere else.

West paid a heavy price for her cool reaction to the Russian Revolution; her positions increasingly isolated her. When Emma Goldman visited Britain in 1924 after seeing Bolshevik violence firsthand, West was exasperated that British intellectuals ignored Goldman's testimony and her warning against Bolshevik tyranny.

For all her censures of communism, however, West was hardly an uncritical supporter of Western democracies. Thus in 1919–1920, she excoriated the US government for deporting Goldman and for the infamous Palmer Raids. She was also appalled at the failure of Western democracies to come to the aid of Republican Spain, and she gave money to the Republican cause.

A staunch anti-fascist, West attacked both the Conservative governments of her own country for appeasing Adolf Hitler and her colleagues on the left for their pacifism. Neither side, in her view, understood the evil Nazism posed. Unlike many on the left, she also distrusted Joseph Stalin. To West, Stalin had a criminal mentality that communism facilitated. She was outraged when the Allies switched their loyalties as to Yugoslav resistance movements by deciding in 1943 to start backing the Communist-led Partisans led by Tito in Yugoslavia, thus abandoning their support of Draža Mihailović's Chetniks, whom she considered the legitimate Yugoslav resistance. She expressed her feelings and opinions on the Allies' switch in Yugoslavia by writing the satirical short story titled "Madame Sara's Magic Crystal", but decided not to publish it upon discussion with Orme Sargent, Assistant Under-Secretary of State at the Foreign Office. Writing in her diary, West mentioned that Sargent had persuaded her that "the recognition of Tito was made by reason of British military necessities, and for no other reason." Following Sargent's claim, she described her decision not to publish the story as an expression of "personal willingness to sacrifice myself to the needs of my country." After the war, West's anti-Communism hardened as she saw Poland, Czechoslovakia, Hungary, and other Eastern and Central European states succumb to Soviet domination.

In 1951 she provided a critical review of Alistair Cooke's sympathetic portrait of Alger Hiss during his postwar trials from a classical liberalism point of view. It is not surprising in this context that West reacted to US Senator Joseph McCarthy differently from her colleagues. They saw a demagogue terrorising liberals and leftists with baseless accusations of Communist conspiracy. West saw an oaf blundering into the minefield of Communist subversion. For her, McCarthy was right to pursue Communists with fervour, even if his methods were roughshod, though her mild reaction to McCarthy provoked powerful revulsion among those on the left and dismay even among anti-Communist liberals. She refused, however, to amend her views.

Although West's anti-communism earned the high regard of conservatives, she never considered herself one of them. In postwar Britain, West voted Labour and welcomed the Labour landslide of 1945 but spoke out against domination of the Labour Party by British trade unions, and thought left-wing politicians such as Michael Foot unimpressive. She had mixed feelings about the Callaghan government. West admired Margaret Thatcher, not for Thatcher's policies, but for Thatcher's achievement in rising to the top of a male-dominated sphere.

In the end, West's anti-communism remained the centrepiece of her politics because she so consistently challenged the communists as legitimate foes of the status quo in capitalist countries. In West's view, communism, like fascism, was merely a form of authoritarianism. Communists were under party discipline, and therefore could never speak for themselves; West was a supreme example of an intellectual who spoke for herself, no matter how her comments might injure her. Indeed, few writers explicitly acknowledged how much West's embrace of unpopular positions hurt her on the left. A whole generation of writers abandoned West and refused to read her, as Doris Lessing suggested.

== Religion ==
West's parents had her baptised into the Church of England two months after birth and she considered herself a Christian, though an unconventional believer. At times, she found God to be wicked; at other times she considered him merely ineffectual and defeated. However, she revered Christ as the quintessentially good man, she had great respect for the literary, pictorial, and architectural manifestations of the Christian ethos, and she considered faith a valid tool to grapple with the conundrums of life and the mysteries of the cosmos. Although her writings are full of references to the Bible and ecclesiastical history, she was essentially anti-doctrinaire and occasionally blasphemous. In 1926 she expressed the unorthodox belief that "Christianity must be regarded not as a final revelation but as a phase of revelation." Moreover, she rejected specific articles of belief such as the virgin birth, Original sin, the Atonement, and Providence. Her contribution to Virginia Woolf's Hogarth Letters Series, Letter to a Grandfather (1933), is a declaration of "my faith, which seems to some unfaith" disguised as philosophical fiction. Written in the midst of the Great Depression, Letter to a Grandfather traces the progressive degeneration of the notion of Providence through the ages, concluding skeptically that "the redemptive power of divine grace no longer seemed credible, nor very respectable in the arbitrary performance that was claimed for it." As for the Atonement, Black Lamb and Grey Falcon is in part meant as a refutation of that very doctrine, which she saw as having sparked a fatal obsession with sacrifice throughout the Christian era and, specifically, as having prompted Neville Chamberlain to formulate his policy of appeasement, which she vehemently opposed. She wrote:

All our Western thought is founded on this repulsive pretence that pain is the proper price of any good thing ... [Augustine] developed a theory of the Atonement which was pure nonsense, yet had the power to convince ... This monstrous theory supposes that God was angry with man for his sins and that He wanted to punish him for these, not in any way that might lead to his reformation, but simply by inflicting pain on him; and that He allowed Christ to suffer this pain instead of man and thereafter was willing on certain terms to treat man as if he had not committed these sins. This theory flouts reason at all points, for it is not possible that a just God should forgive people who are wicked because another person who was good endured agony by being nailed to a cross.

World War II shocked her into a more conventional belief: "I believe if people are looking for the truth, the truth of the Christian religion will come out and meet them." In the early 1950s, she thought she had a mystical revelation in France and actively tried to convert to Catholicism. There was a precedent in her family for this action, as her sister, Letitia, had earlier converted to Catholicism, thereby causing quite a stir, but West's attempt was short-lived, and she confessed to a friend: "I could not go on with being a Catholic ... I don't want, I can't bear to, become a Graham Greene and Evelyn Waugh, and I cannot believe that I am required to pay such a price for salvation." Her writings of the 1960s and early 1970s again betray a profound mistrust towards God: "The case against religion is the responsibility of God for the sufferings of mankind, which makes it impossible to believe the good things said about Him in the Bible, and consequently to believe anything it says about Him."

Alongside her fluctuating Christianity, West was fascinated with Manichaeanism. She describes the Manichean idea that the world is a mixture of two primeval kingdoms, one of light the other of darkness, as an "extremely useful conception of life" affirming that a "fusion of light and darkness" is "the essential human character." On the other hand, West criticised "the strictly literal mind of the founder [of Manichaeanism] and his followers" and what she perceived as the meanness of Christian heretics who adopted Manichaean ideas. West states that "the whole of modern history could be deduced from the popularity of this heresy in Western Europe: its inner sourness, its preference for hate over love and for war over peace, its courage about dying, its cowardice about living." Regarding the suppression of Manichaean heresies by the Christian authorities West says that whilst "it is our tendency to sympathise with the hunted hare... much that we read of Western European heretics makes us suspect that here the quarry was less of a hare than a priggish skunk." Nonetheless, Manichean influence persists in an unpublished draft of West's own memoirs where she writes: "I had almost no possibility of holding faith of any religious kind except a belief in a wholly and finally defeated God, a hypothesis which I now accept but tried for a long time to reject, I could not face it."

West's interest in Manichaeanism reflects her lifelong struggle with the question of how to deal with dualisms. At times she appears to favour the merging of opposites, for which Byzantium served as a model: "church and state, love and violence, life and death, were to be fused again as in Byzantium." More dominant, however, was her tendency to view the tensions generated in the space between dualistic terms as life-sustaining and creative; hence, her aversion to homosexuality and her warning not to confuse the drive for feminist emancipation with the woman's desire to become like a man. Her insistence on the fundamental difference between men and women reveals her essentialism, but it also bespeaks her innate Manichaean sensibility. She wanted respect and equal rights for women, but at the same time she required that women retain their specifically feminine qualities, notably an affinity with life: "Men have a disposition to violence; women have not. If one says that men are on the side of death, women on the side of life, one seems to be making an accusation against men. One is not doing that." One reason why she does not want to make an accusation against men is that they are simply playing their assigned role in a flawed universe. Only love can alleviate destructive aspects of the sex-antagonism: "I loathe the way the two cancers of sadism and masochism eat into the sexual life of humanity, so that the one lifts the lash and the other offers blood to the blow, and both are drunken with the beastly pleasure of misery and do not proceed with love's business of building a shelter from the cruelty of the universe." In addition to the operations of love, female emancipation is crucial to removing the moral, professional, and social stigma associated with the notion of the "weaker sex," without trying to do away altogether with the temperamental and metaphysical aspects of the gender dualism itself. Thus, the "sex war" described in West's early short story "Indissoluble Matrimony" (1914) elevates the female character, Evadne, in the end because she accepts the terms of the contest without superficially trying to "win" that war.

The task of reconciling dualisms can also be seen in West's political propensities. As Bernard Schweizer has argued: "St. Augustine and Schopenhauer emphasized the fallenness of human life, implying a quietistic stance that could be confused with conservatism, while the Reclus brothers [famous French anarchists] urged her to revolt against such pessimistic determinism. West's characteristically heroic personal and historic vision is a result of these two contending forces." West's conviction that humanity will only fulfill its highest potentials if it adheres to the principle of process reflects the same preoccupation: "Process is her most encompassing doctrine," states Peter Wolfe. "Reconciling her dualism, it captures the best aspects of the male and female principles."

== Cultural references ==
Long time book reviewer and senior editor at Time, Whittaker Chambers, considered West "a novelist of note ... a distinguished literary critic ... above all ... one of the greatest of living journalists."

Virginia Woolf questioned Rebecca West being labelled as an "arrant feminist" because she offended men by saying they are snobs in chapter two of A Room of One's Own: "[W]hy was Miss West an arrant feminist for making a possibly true if uncomplimentary statement about the other sex?"

Bill Moyers's interview "A Visit With Dame Rebecca West," recorded in her London home when she was 89, was aired by PBS in July 1981. In a review of the interview, John O'Connor wrote that "Dame Rebecca emerges as a formidable presence. When she finds something or somebody disagreeable, the adjective suddenly becomes withering."

West's first novel, The Return of the Soldier, was turned into a major motion picture in 1982, directed by Alan Bridges, starring Alan Bates, Glenda Jackson, and Julie Christie. More recently, an adaptation of The Return of the Soldier for the stage by Kelly Younger titled Once a Marine took West's theme of shell-shock-induced amnesia and applied it to a soldier returning from the war in Iraq with PTSD.

There have been two plays about Rebecca West produced since 2004. That Woman: Rebecca West Remembers, by Carl Rollyson, Helen Macleod, and Anne Bobby, is a one-woman monologue in which an actress playing Rebecca West recounts her life through some of her most famous articles, letters, and books. Tosca's Kiss, a 2006 play by Kenneth Jupp, retells West's experience covering the Nuremberg trials for The New Yorker.

Robert D. Kaplan's influential book Balkan Ghosts (1994) is an homage to West's Black Lamb and Grey Falcon (1941), which he calls "this century's greatest travel book."

In February 2006, BBC broadcast a radio version of West's novel The Fountain Overflows, dramatized by Robin Brook, in six 55-minute instalments.

== Bibliography ==
=== Fiction ===
- 1914 – Indissoluble Matrimony, a controversial short story which was first published in Blast No. 1. Edited by Yolanda Morató for the Spanish publishing house Zut, it was also published in the Spanish edition of Blast No. 1 (Madrid: Juan March Foundation, 2010). This novella challenges many issues about feminism and women's involvement in politics in pre-war Britain.
- 1918 – The Return of the Soldier, the first World War I novel written by a woman, about a shell-shocked, amnesiac soldier returning from World War I in hopes of being reunited with his first love, a working-class woman, instead of continuing to live with his upper-class wife.
- 1922 – The Judge, a novel combining Freudian Oedipal themes with suffragism and an existential take on cosmic absurdity.
- 1929 – Harriet Hume, a modernist story about a piano-playing prodigy and her obsessive lover, a corrupt politician.
- 1935 – The Harsh Voice: Four Short Novels, contains the short story "The Salt of the Earth," featuring Alice Pemberton, whose obsessive altruism becomes so smothering that her husband plots her murder. This was adapted for The Alfred Hitchcock Hour as "The Paragon" starring Joan Fontaine (season 1, episode 20) in 1963. An additional story from the collection, "There is No Conversation", is the tale of a romance as told in hindsight by both parties, one a caddish Frenchman and the other a coarse American woman. This story was adapted for an hour-long radio drama in 1950 on NBC University Theatre and featured a commentary on West's story and writing skills by Katherine Anne Porter.
- 1936 – The Thinking Reed, a novel about the corrupting influence of wealth even on originally decent people. Perhaps a disguised self-critique of her own elegant lifestyle.
- 1956 – The Fountain Overflows, a semi-autobiographical novel weaving a cultural, historical, and psychological tapestry of the first decade of the 20th century, reflected through the prism of the gifted, eccentric Aubrey family.
- 1966 – The Birds Fall Down, spy thriller based on the deeds of the historical double agent Yevno Azef.
- 1984 – This Real Night, sequel to The Fountain Overflows published posthumously
- 1985 – Cousin Rosamund, final, unfinished installment of the "Aubrey Trilogy" published posthumously
- 1986 – Sunflower, published posthumously, about a tense love-relationship between an actress and a politician, reminiscent of West's relationship with H. G. Wells.
- 2002 – The Sentinel, edited by Kathryn Laing and published posthumously, West's very first extended piece of fiction, an unfinished novel about the suffragist struggle in Britain, including grim scenes of female incarceration and force-feeding.

=== Non-fiction ===
- 1916 – Henry James
- 1928 – The Strange Necessity: Essays and Reviews, a blend of modernist literary criticism and cognitive science, including a long essay explaining why West disliked James Joyce's Ulysses, though she judged it an important book
- 1931 – Ending in Earnest: A Literary Log
- 1932 – Arnold Bennett Himself, John Day
- 1933 – St. Augustine, first psycho-biography of the Christian Church Father
- 1934 – The Modern Rake's Progress (co-authored with cartoonist David Low)
- 1941 – Black Lamb and Grey Falcon, a 1,181-page classic of travel literature, giving an account of Balkan history and ethnography, and the significance of Nazism, structured around her trip to Yugoslavia in 1937
- 1949 – The Meaning of Treason, edit new 1964 – The New Meaning of Treason
- 1955 – A Train of Powder
- 1958 – The Court and the Castle: some treatments of a recurring theme, excellent revisionist interpretations of literary classics, including Hamlet and Kafka's stories
- 1963 – The Vassall Affair
- 1982 – 1900, cultural history and fascinating "thick description" of this pivotal year
- 1982 – The Young Rebecca, West's early, radical journalism for The Freewoman and Clarion, edited by Jane Marcus
- 1987 – Family Memories: An Autobiographical Journey, West's autobiographical musings which remained unpublished during her life, assembled and edited by Faith Evans
- 2000 – The Selected Letters of Rebecca West, edited by Bonnie Kime Scott
- 2003 – Survivors in Mexico, posthumous work about West's two trips to Mexico in 1966 and 1969, edited by Bernard Schweizer
- 2005 – Woman as Artist and Thinker, re-issues of some of West's best essays, together with her short-story "Parthenope"
- 2010 – The Essential Rebecca West: Uncollected Prose,

=== Select criticism and biography ===
- Wolfe, Peter (1 November 1971). Rebecca West: artist and thinker. Southern Illinois University Press. ISBN 978-0-8093-0483-7.
- Deakin, Motley F. (1980). Rebecca West. Twayne Authors. Twayne. ISBN 978-0-8057-6788-9.
- Orel, Harold (1986). The literary achievement of Rebecca West. Macmillan. ISBN 978-0-333-23672-7.
- Glendinning, Victoria (1987). Rebecca West: A Life. Knopf. ISBN 0394539354.
- Max, Gerry, "Quest For Fame: Thomas Wolfe's Early Encounters with Literary Celebrity from Michael Arlen to Elinor Wylie," The Thomas Wolfe Review, 2022-2023, 46 & 47, 1 & 2, pgs. 77-99.
- Rollyson, Carl E. (1996). Rebecca West: a life. Scribner. ISBN 0684194309.
- Rollyson, Carl (2007) [1998]. The Literary Legacy of Rebecca West. iUniverse. ISBN 978-0-595-43804-4.
- Norton, Ann V. (2000). Paradoxical Feminism: The Novels of Rebecca West. International Scholars Publications. ISBN 978-1-57309-392-7.
- Cohen, Debra (2001). "Remapping the Home Front: Locating Citizenship in British Women’s Great War Fiction". Northeastern University Press. ISBN 9781555535339.
- Schweizer, Bernard (2002). Rebecca West: heroism, rebellion, and the female epic. Greenwood. ISBN 978-0-313-32360-7.
- Rollyson, Carl (2005). Rebecca West and the God That Failed: Essays. iUniverse. ISBN 978-0-595-36227-1.
- Schweizer, Bernard, ed. (2006). Rebecca West Today: Contemporary Critical Approaches. University of Delaware Press. ISBN 978-0-87413-950-1.
