= List of compositions by Tobias Picker =

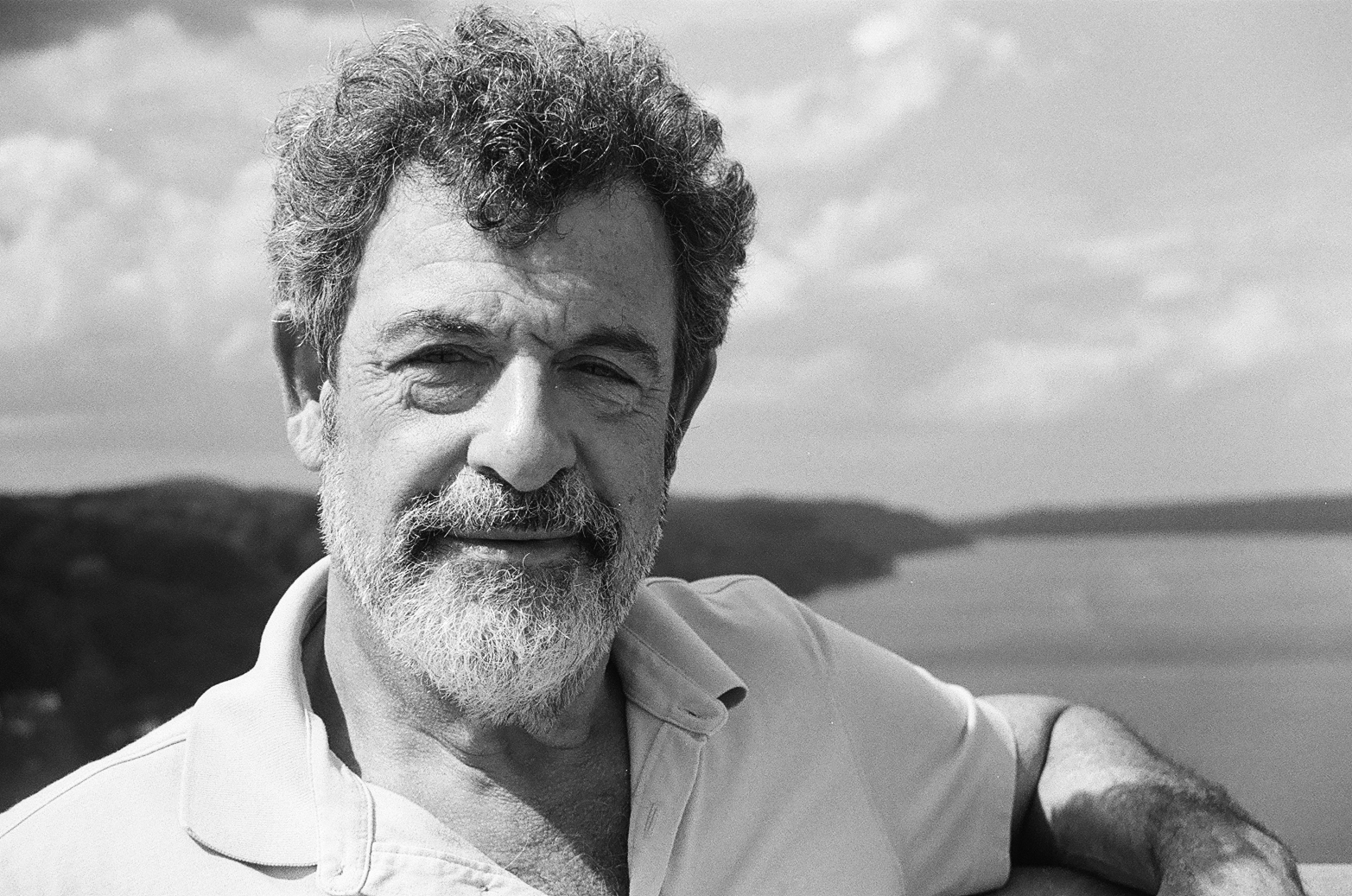
Tobias Picker

The following is a list of compositions by Tobias Picker. For a description of these works, see the associated pages and the Tobias Picker page.

Tobias Picker's music is published exclusively by Schott Music Corporation.

== Stage works ==
=== Operas ===
- Emmeline (1996, commissioned by the Santa Fe Opera, premiered July 27, 1996, libretto by J.D. McClatchy, based on the novel by Judith Rossner)
- Fantastic Mr. Fox (1998, commissioned by the Roald Dahl Foundation, premiered December 9, 1998, libretto by Donald Sturrock, based on the book by Roald Dahl)
- Thérèse Raquin (1999/2000, commissioned by the Dallas Opera, premiered November 30, 2001, libretto by Gene Scheer, based on the novel by Émile Zola)
- An American Tragedy (2005/2006, commissioned by the Metropolitan Opera, premiered December 2, 2005, libretto by Gene Scheer, based on the novel by Theodore Dreiser)
- Dolores Claiborne (premiered September 18, 2013 by the San Francisco Opera, libretto by J.D. McClatchy, based on the novel by Stephen King)

=== Ballets ===
- Awakenings (2010, premiered September 22, 2010, libretto by Oliver Sacks after his book)

== Works for large ensemble ==
=== Symphonies ===
- Symphony No. 1 in two movements (1982, premiered 1983)
- Symphony No. 2 Aussöhnung for soprano and orchestra (1986)
- Symphony No. 3 for string orchestra, (1988, premiered 1989, after his String Quartet and Bass (1988), see Chamber music)

=== Other works for orchestra ===
- The Blue Hula for chamber ensemble (1981)
- The Encantadas for narrator and orchestra (1983, see also Works for voice and orchestra)
- Old and Lost Rivers for orchestra (1986)
- The Encantadas for narrator and chamber orchestra (1986, from his work for narrator and orchestra The Encantadas (1983), see Works for voice and orchestra)
- Séance: Hommage à Sibelius for orchestra (1991)
- Two Fantasies for orchestra (1989, premiered 1990)
- And Suddenly It's Evening for orchestra and solo violin concert master (1994)
- Opera Without Words for orchestra (2016)

=== Works for wind ensemble ===
- Dedication Anthem for wind ensemble (1984)

=== Concerti, solo instruments and orchestra ===
- Piano Concerto No. 1 (1980)
- Violin Concerto (1981)
- Keys to the City (Piano Concerto No. 2) (1983)
- Piano Concerto No. 3: Kilauea (1986)
- Romances and Interludes for oboe and orchestra (1989, Romances are orchestrations of Robert Schumann's Op. 94)
- Bang! for amplified piano and orchestra (1992)
- Viola Concerto (1994)
- Concerto for cello and orchestra (1999)

== Works for piano ==
=== Solo piano ===
- When Soft Voices Die (1977)
- Old and Lost Rivers (1986)
- The Blue Hula (1990)
- Three Pieces (1990)
- Where The Rivers Go (1994)
- Four Etudes for Ursula (1996)
- Three Nocturnes (2009)

=== Works for two pianos ===
- Pianorama for two pianos (1984)

== Chamber music ==
- Septet for flute, bassoon, trumpet, trombone, piano, violin, and percussion (1975)
- Sextet No. 2 for oboe, clarinet, violin, cello, piano, and percussion (1976)
- Sextet No. 3 for flute, violin, cello, bass, piano, and percussion (1977)
- Rhapsody for violin and piano (1978)
- Romance for violin and piano (1979)
- Nova for violin, viola, cello, bass, and piano (1979, composed as a companion piece to the "Trout" quintet)
- Octet for oboe, bass clarinet, horn, harp, violin, cello, bass, and percussion (1979)
- The Blue Hula for flute, clarinet, violin, cello, piano, and percussion (1981)
- Serenade for piano and wind quintet (1983)
- String Quartet No. 1: New Memories (1987)
- Keys to the City chamber version for solo piano, oboe, clarinet, bassoon, and strings (1987)
- String Quartet and Bass (1988)
- Invisible Lilacs for violin and piano (1991)
- Suite for cello and piano (1998)
- String Quartet No. 2 (2008)
- Piano Quintet: "Live Oaks" (2011)

== Vocal works ==
- Aussöhnung for medium or high voice and piano (1984, text by Goethe)
- When We Meet Again (Sonnet) for medium or high voice and piano (1985, text by Edna St. Vincent Millay)
- Half a Year Together for medium or high voice and piano (1987, text by Richard Howard)
- Remembering for medium or high voice and piano (1987, text by Edna St. Vincent Millay)
- Two Songs (from The Rain in the Trees) for medium or high voice and piano (1992, text by W.S. Merwin)
- Not Even the Rain for medium or high voice and piano (1999, text by e.e. cummings)
- Irrational Exuberance for medium-high to high voice and piano (2001, text by Gene Scheer)
- Tres Sonetos de Amor for medium or high voice and piano (2000, three sonnets by Pablo Neruda)
- I Am In Need of Music for medium or high voice and piano (2004, text by Elizabeth Bishop)
- Amo el trozo de tierra for medium or high voice and piano (2005, text by Pablo Neruda)
- Choruses of the Trees for four-part children's choir (2009, text by Roald Dahl)

== Works for voice and orchestra ==
- The Encantadas for narrator and orchestra (1983, based on the writings on Herman Melville)
- The Encantadas version for narrator and chamber orchestra (1986)
- The Rain in the Trees for flute, medium or high voice, and orchestra (1993)
- Tres Sonetos de Amor for baritone and orchestra (2000, three sonnets by Pablo Neruda)
- The Rain in the Trees version for soprano and orchestra (2000)
