= Francesca Zambello =

American opera and theatre director (born 1956)

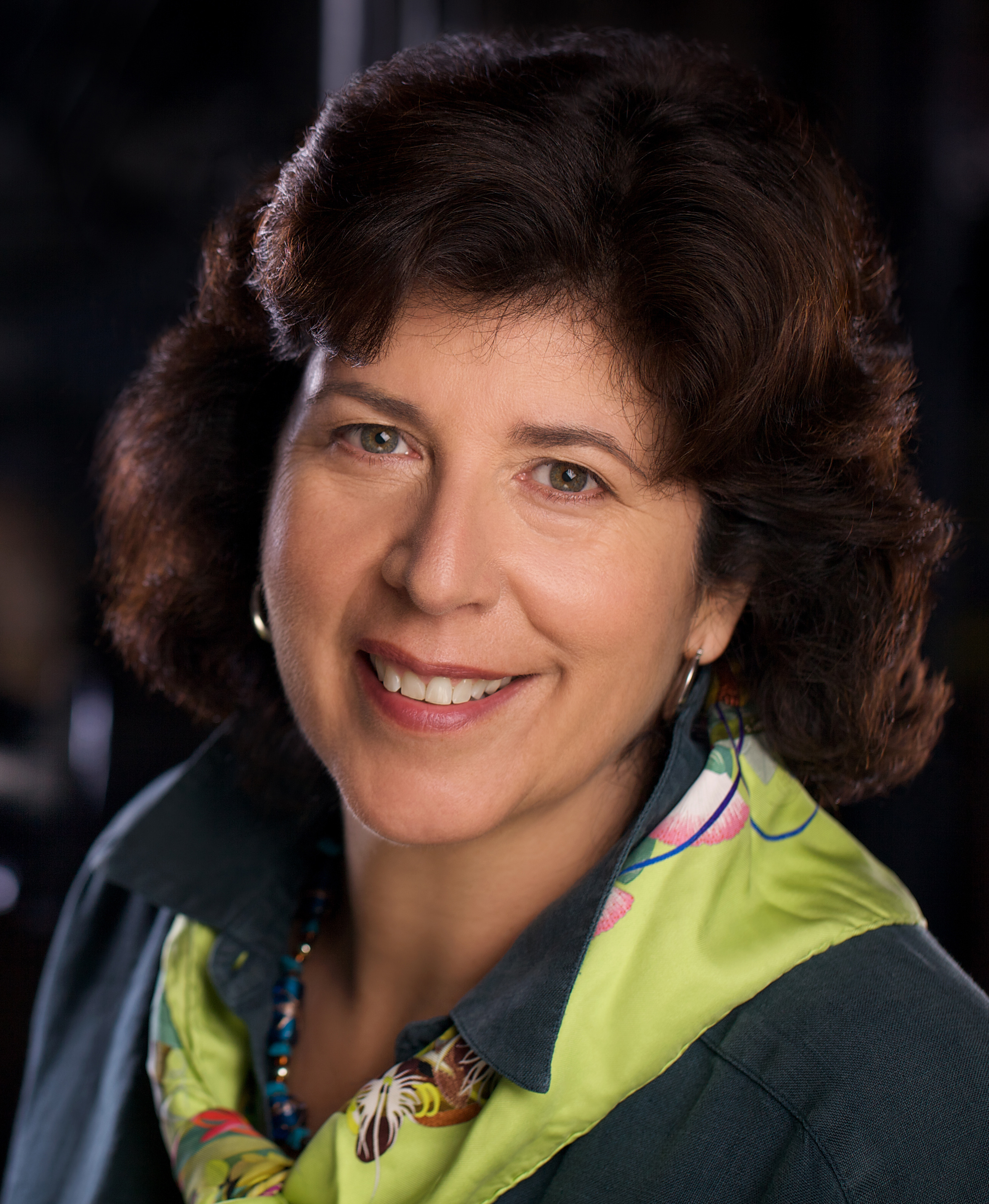
Francesca Zambello in 2010

Francesca Zambello (born August 24, 1956) is an American opera and theatre director. She is the artistic director of Washington National Opera.

== Early life and education ==
Born in New York City, Zambello lived in Europe when she was a child, learning to speak French, Italian, German and Russian. Zambello is of Italian descent, the daughter of actress Jean (née Sincere) and Charles C. Zambello, a former actor who became head of flight entertainment at TWA. She attended Moscow University in 1976 and graduated from Colgate University in 1978.

== Career ==
An internationally recognized director of opera and theater, Francesca Zambello's American debut took place at the Houston Grand Opera with a production of Fidelio in 1984. She began her career as an assistant director to Jean-Pierre Ponnelle. From 1984 until 1991 she was the artistic director of the Skylight Music Theater with Stephen Wadsworth. She debuted in Europe at Teatro La Fenice in Venice with Beatrice di Tenda in 1987 and has since staged new productions at major theaters, festivals and opera houses around the world. Also, she was artistic advisor to the San Francisco Opera from 2006 until 2011. Between 2011 and 2022, she was artistic and general director of the Glimmerglass Festival in Cooperstown, and she is currently the artistic director of Washington National Opera, a post that she has held since 2012.

Zambello has been awarded the Chevalier des Arts et des Lettres by the French government for her contribution to French culture and the Russian Federation's Medal for Service to Culture. She received the San Francisco Opera's Medallion of Honor for her work there over three decades. Other honors for her work include three Olivier Awards from the London Society of Theaters and two Evening Standard Awards for Best Musical and Best Opera. She has also received the award for Best Company Achievement. The French Grand prix de la musique du syndicat de la critique was awarded to her twice for her work at the Paris Opera. Other awards include Best Production in Japan, the Palme d'Or in Germany, the Golden Mask in Russia and the Helpmann Award in Australia.

Zambello developed and directed the world premiere of Christopher Theofanidis' Heart of a Soldier for the San Francisco Opera, where she was artistic advisor from 2006 to 2011. Other opera projects have included the first international production of Carmen to ever be presented at the National Center for the Performing Arts in Beijing, Tobias Picker's Emmeline for Santa Fe Opera, Thérèse for Dallas Opera, and Picker's An American Tragedy for the Metropolitan Opera. Additionally, she mounted productions of Cyrano and Les Troyens for the Metropolitan Opera, Carmen and Don Giovanni at the Royal Opera House, Boris Godunov, War and Peace, Billy Budd and William Tell at the Paris Opera, and Der Ring des Nibelungen for the San Francisco Opera and the Washington National Opera.

Theater projects have included Show Boat in London at the Royal Albert Hall as well as for the Lyric Opera of Chicago and San Francisco Opera; a new musical, Rebecca, for Vienna's Raimund Theater, Stuttgart's Palladium Theater (presented by Stage Entertainment), and in St. Gallen, Switzerland; Tibet Through the Red Box, a new play by David Henry Hwang for the Seattle Children's Theatre; The Little Prince with Oscar-winning composer Rachel Portman; Napoleon in the West End; The Little Mermaid for Disney on Broadway; the musical of The Little House on the Prairie and The Master Butchers at the Guthrie Theater, and Aladdin in Disneyland. For the 2011 Glimmerglass Festival, Zambello, Terrence McNally, and Deborah Voigt collaborated to produce the stage show Voigt Lessons which was revived in 2015 at the Art House in Provincetown, Massachusetts.

Other works have included a film of Menotti's Amahl and the Night Visitors for BBC Television, as well as a new film for the BBC, Sony and PBS of The Little Prince, and West Side Story for the floating stage at the Bregenzer Festspiele. Works on DVD include War and Peace, Carmen, The Little Prince, Street Scene, Show Boat and Porgy and Bess.

Zambello was a guest professor at Yale University.

Zambello lives in New York City with her wife, attorney Faith E. Gay, and her stepson, Jackson.
