= Man on the Moon (opera) =

- Opera by Jonathan Dove
- Librettist: Nicholas Wright
- Language: English
- Based on: Apollo 11 Moon landing
- Premiere: 26 December 2006; Channel 4

Man on the Moon is a 2006 television opera in one act by Jonathan Dove with a libretto by Nicholas Wright. It relates the story of the Apollo 11 Moon landing on 20 July 1969 and the subsequent problems experienced by Buzz Aldrin, the second man to walk on the Moon.

The opera, about 50 minutes long, was commissioned by Channel 4 and first shown on 26 December 2006. The director was Rupert Edwards. In 2007, it won the Opera Special Prize at the 2007 Festival Rose d'Or in Lucerne, Switzerland.

== Roles ==
Role	Voice type	Premiere cast, 26 December 2006 (Conductor:)
Aldrin	baritone	Nathan Gunn
Joan Aldrin, his wife	soprano	Patricia Racette
Michael, their son	actor	Gregg Sulkin
Their daughter	actor	Morgan Elliott
Jeannie Bassett	mezzo-soprano	
Dean Woodruff	tenor	
Dee O'Hara	soprano	
Mike Collins	baritone	
Neil Armstrong	tenor	
Eugene Kranz	baritone	
GUIDO	tenor	
CAPCOM	baritone	
Audrey Moon	soprano	
PR Man	baritone	
Lady reporter	soprano	
TV Host	tenor	
Media people, Mission Control (male chorus); 3 Newscasters, PAO (spoken roles)

== Synopsis ==
The opera chronicles the preparations for the Apollo 11 mission, the journey and the landing. But it also deals with Aldrin's marriage break-up and the short-lived nature of fame.

== See also ==
- Apollo 11 in popular culture
