= Dicapo Opera Theatre =

Former New York City opera company and venue

Dicapo Opera Theatre was an opera company and venue in Manhattan, New York City. It was co-founded in 1981 by general director Michael Capasso and artistic director Diane Martindale. It closed in 2013.

== Programming and premieres ==
Dicapo Opera Theatre's presentations ranged from traditional repertoire to rarely performed operas, special opera-dance presentations, family events, and at least one contemporary work each season. Its premieres included the world premiere of Francesco Cilluffo's Il caso Mortara, the American premiere of Donizetti's Il campanello (The Night Bell) and the New York premieres of Oscar Straus's The Merry Nibelungs, Richard Wargo's A Chekhov Trilogy, Robert Ward's Claudia Legare, and Tobias Picker's Thérèse Raquin, as well as the New York premiere of Lehár's The Merry Widow with a contemporary libretto by Wendy Wasserstein.

== Puccini at Dicapo ==
Since its founding, Dicapo had been particularly dedicated to the music of Giacomo Puccini. It gave the first performances anywhere of all three versions of Puccini's Madama Butterfly (Milan, Brescia, and Paris) successively in one weekend. With choreography by Dicapo's director of dance, Nilas Martins, Dicapo was the first to present music and dance presentations of Puccini's Le Villi and the Messa, and has also presented settings of a number of Puccini songs and incidental music to dance. By the end of 2008, the 150th anniversary of the composer's birth, Dicapo Opera Theatre had presented all of his major works, from Le Villi, the composer's first opera, and orchestral works through his final opera, Turandot.

== The theater ==
Located on the lower level of St. Jean Baptiste Church at 184 East 76th Street in Manhattan, Dicapo Opera Theatre was completely remodelled in 1995 and was a fully equipped, 204-seat air-conditioned facility with orchestra pit, spacious lobby areas, offices and rehearsal spaces.
