= Aryeh Lev Stollman =

Canadian-American fiction writer

- Born: 1954 (age 71–72); Detroit, Michigan, U.S.
- Occupations: Novelist, Librettist, Neuroradiologist
- Spouse: Tobias Picker
- Writing career
- Period: 1990s–present
- Notable works: The Far Euphrates, The Illuminated Soul, Awakenings (libretto), Lili Elbe (libretto)
- Website: www.aryehlevstollman.com

Aryeh Lev Stollman (born 1954) is a writer and physician based in the United States. A neuroradiologist at Mount Sinai Medical Center in New York City, he has also published several works of fiction.

== Early life ==
Born in Detroit, Michigan and raised in Windsor, Ontario, where his father was an Orthodox rabbi and professor and chairman of the English Department at the University of Windsor, Stollman studied at Yeshiva University and the Albert Einstein College of Medicine.

== Works ==
He published his first novel, The Far Euphrates (Riverhead), in 1997. The book won the Lambda Literary Award for Gay Fiction at the 10th Lambda Literary Awards, as well as being named to year-end notable books lists by the American Library Association, the Los Angeles Times and the National Book Critics Circle. The Far Euphrates has been translated into German, Dutch, Italian, Portuguese and Hebrew. In the New York Times Book Review, Margot Livesey called The Far Euphrates "radiant . . . remarkable both for Stollman's eloquently understated prose and for the ease with which he constructs his artful plot . . . At the heart of The Far Euphrates lie the vexed questions raised by the Holocaust and its legacy: how we must try to solve for ourselves the riddle of God's existence and cultivate a sense of mercy in an unforgiving age."

His second novel, The Illuminated Soul (Riverhead), was published in 2002 and won the Harold U. Ribalow Prize for Jewish literature from Hadassah Magazine, and his short story collection The Dialogues of Time and Entropy (Riverhead) was published in 2003.

His story "Lotte Returns!" was commissioned by National Public Radio and broadcast in 2008 and again in 2025.

His third novel, Queen of Jerusalem, was published in 2020 by Aryeh Nir/Modan in Hebrew translation.

Stollman wrote the libretto for Tobias Picker's Awakenings, based on Oliver Sacks' 1973 chronicle of his efforts to help the victims of the encephalitis lethargica epidemic, which premiered at Opera Theatre of Saint Louis, conducted by Roberto Kalb and directed by James Robinson. The East Coast premiere of Awakenings was performed by Odyssey Opera in partnership with Boston Modern Orchestra Project, conducted by Gil Rose and directed by James Robinson, on February 25, 2023, at the newly renovated Huntington Theater.

He has also written the libretto for Lili Elbe, an opera composed by Tobias Picker, commissioned by Theater St. Gallen, which premiered October 22, 2023 in Saint Gallen, Switzerland starring Heldenbaritonistin Lucia Lucas. Lili Elbe was named Best World Premiere at the 2024 Oper! Awards at the Dutch National Opera in Amsterdam. Lili Elbe will have its American Premiere at Santa Fe Opera in August 2026.

== Private life ==
He is the husband of composer Tobias Picker.

== Works ==
- The Far Euphrates (1997, ISBN 1573226971)
- The Illuminated Soul (2002, ISBN 978-1573222013)
- The Dialogues of Time and Entropy (2003, ISBN 978-1573223751)
