= Francesco Cilluffo =

Italian conductor and composer

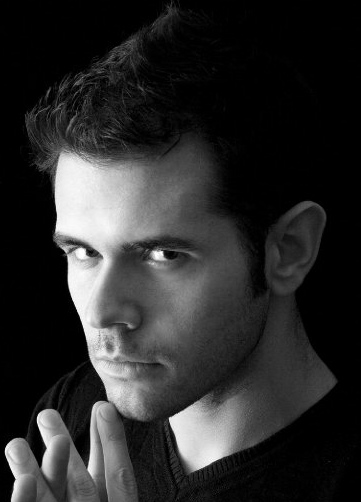
Francesco Cilluffo

Francesco Cilluffo (born in Turin, Italy, January 1979) is an Italian conductor and composer.

== Education ==
He graduated in Composition and Conducting with Gilberto Bosco from the Conservatorio G. Verdi in Turin after having completed a Music Degree from the University of Turin with a thesis about Benjamin Britten's Billy Budd. In 2003 he moved to London, where he completed a PhD in Composition at the King's College London, after having been awarded a Master in Composition at the Guildhall School of Music and Drama in London. He also held the position of a Composition and Conducting fellow for the Academic Year 2004-2005. Particularly important for his development as a composer were the sessions with Alexander Goehr in Cambridge and meeting Tobias Picker. His works have been performed in Italy, England, Austria, Russia, United States and Hong Kong.

He has worked as assistant conductor in the United States (Lyric Opera of Chicago and Hollywood Bowl Orchestra) and Europe (Gewandhaus, Leipzig, Danish National Symphony Orchestra, Copenhagen Opera House, Opéra national du Rhin, Strasbourg, and Teatro La Fenice, Venice). He has also attended master classes with conductors such as Michael Tilson Thomas, Iván Fischer, Gianluigi Gelmetti.

== Conducting activities ==
Cilluffo has distinguished himself as a conductor in venues such as the Barbican Centre, Sadler's Wells Theatre, City of London Festival in London, Tchaikovsky Concert Hall in Moscow, Teatro Massimo in Palermo, Municipal Theatre of Santiago in Chile, Teatro Pergolesi in Jesi, Nuovo Teatro Comunale in Sassari, Teatro Fraschini in Pavia, Teatro Ponchielli in Cremona, Teatro Sociale in Como, Teatro Grande in Brescia, Teatro Rossini in Lugo and festivals such as Festival della Valle d'Itria, Incontri in Terra di Siena. Among his recent conducting engagements are Zemlinsky's Der König Kandaules at the Teatro Massimo in Palermo, Mahler's Das Lied von der Erde at the Festival della Valle d'Itria, a tour of concerts with the Orquesta Filarmónica de Santiago in Chile (featuring music by Rossini, Haydn and Mendelssohn), Marco Tutino's opera The Servant at the Teatro Rossini in Lugo and Mozart's Requiem (edited by Robert D. Levin) with the Orchestra Filarmonica di Torino in Turin. He also conducted Luigi Cherubini's Requiem in C minor with the orchestra and chorus of the Accademia Stefano Tempia in Turin and an all-Handel concert with the same company.

== Composing activities ==
=== Instrumental music ===
Cilluffo's most recent instrumental music includes Drash for orchestra (commissioned and premiered by the Chicago Arts Orchestra), Il barone rampante after Italo Calvino's famous book, commissioned by the RAI National Symphony Orchestra featuring actress Sonia Bergamasco, the piano trios This island's mine and Turning to Turner (commissioned by the Trio Debussy) and the string symphony Castelli di Rabbia (after Alessandro Baricco's novel), performed as part of the 2006 Winter Olympics celebrations. His most performed chamber works include A Sonata Play for cello and piano and Il sistema periodico for piano solo (based on the book by Primo Levi).

=== Vocal music ===
Cilluffo enjoys particular success working with voices. His cantata for the 150th anniversary of the Italian unification, Voci di tenebra azzurra (for chorus, mezzo-soprano and orchestra), was premiered at the 2011 Festival della Valle d'Itria to much critical acclaim. His last song cycle for soprano and string orchestra, The Land to Life again, was premiered at the Festival Incontri in Terra di Siena in 2012. His choral piece Carmen Artemisiae, based on the life of Artemisia Gentileschi, was also premiered in 2012. Among his recent vocal cycles are also Death in Florence (commissioned by the London Song Festival) and Emily Dickinson: a Song Cycle, which was awarded the Tracey Chawell Memorial Prize in London. He was also awarded the East-West Competition for The Other Boat, commissioned by the Elektra Ensemble in Amsterdam.

=== Operas ===
- Edward II: a two-act opera based on Christopher Marlowe's tragedy, written during his PhD at King's College, it was awarded a Special Prize at the Fux International Opera Competition at the Universität für Musik und darstellende Kunst in Graz.
- Il caso Mortara: a two-act opera based on the true story of Edgardo Mortara. It is the first Italian opera commissioned to an Italian composer by a New York opera company since the times of Giacomo Puccini at the Metropolitan Opera. The opera was commissioned and produced by the Dicapo Opera Theatre in New York in 2010. The New York Times critic Anthony Tommasini hailed it as one of the most important events of New York's 2010 operatic season.
