= Dolores Claiborne =

1992 novel by Stephen King

- First edition cover
- Author: Stephen King
- Audio read by: Frances Sternhagen
- Illustrator: Bill Russell
- Cover artist: Rob Wood
- Language: English
- Genre: Psychological thriller
- Publisher: Viking
- Publication date: November 1992
- Publication place: United States
- Media type: Print (Hardcover and Paperback)
- Pages: 305
- ISBN: 978-0-670-84452-4

Dolores Claiborne (/ˈkleɪbɔːrn/) is a 1992 psychological thriller by Stephen King. The novel is narrated by the titular character, and introduces the fictional community of Little Tall Island, which Stephen King later used as the setting for the original TV mini-series Storm of the Century. It was the best-selling novel of 1992 in the United States.

The novel led to a 1995 movie adaptation starring Kathy Bates that Time named among the top 10 greatest Stephen King film adaptations in 2013. A two-act opera adaptation premiered in San Francisco in 2013.

== Plot summary ==
Dolores Claiborne, a 65-year-old widow living in the tiny Maine community of Little Tall Island, is suspected of murdering her wealthy, elderly employer, Vera Donovan. Dolores wants to make clear to the police that she did not kill Vera, whom she had looked after for years, but does confess to orchestrating the death of her husband, Joe St. George, almost 30 years previously. Dolores's confession develops into the story of her life, her troubled marriage, and her relationship with her employer.

Dolores describes the arrival of Vera and her millionaire husband, who have bought a summer home on Little Tall Island in 1949. Able to cope with Vera's standards, Dolores takes a job as a maid, then becomes housekeeper at the Donovan home. After Vera's husband dies in a car crash in 1960, she spends increasing time at her island house, eventually moving there permanently. Vera suffers a series of strokes in the 1980s, whereupon Dolores becomes the woman's live-in caretaker and reluctant companion. As Vera slips into dementia, she experiences terrifying hallucinations. When lucid, she subjects Dolores to mind games and power plays.

Dolores reveals that when she began working at the Donovan house, her marriage to Joe was already strained due to his alcoholism and abuse. Their children, Selena, Joe Jr., and Pete, are all unaware. The marriage problems escalate one night in 1960 when Joe viciously hits Dolores in the back over a perceived slight. In retaliation, Dolores smashes a ceramic jug over his head and threatens him with a hatchet, swearing she will kill him if he ever strikes her again. This confrontation is witnessed by Selena. Joe stops beating Dolores, but Selena does not realize that Dolores was acting in self-defense, and Joe uses the incident to gain her sympathy. A rift grows between mother and daughter.

In 1962, Dolores notices Selena becoming increasingly withdrawn. After some speculation, Dolores finally confronts her daughter. She explains the truth, and Selena reluctantly admits that Joe molested her. Dolores vows to protect her. She confronts him, promising to have him arrested if he ever touches Selena again.

Dolores resolves to leave Joe, but when she attempts to withdraw her savings to escape, she discovers Joe has stolen everything. In despair, she confides in Vera. An unusually sympathetic Vera casually remarks that men like Joe often die in accidents, leaving their wives everything. She implies that she arranged the car crash that killed her husband.

Dolores begins plotting Joe's death, but she does not find an opportunity to execute her plan until the following summer. Vera becomes obsessed with a total solar eclipse visible from the island, believing it will convince her estranged children to visit her. She plans a massive viewing party on the island ferry. Seeing the distraction as an opportunity, Dolores sends Selena to camp, and Joe Jr. and Pete are sent to visit family on the mainland. Dolores marks the location of a dried-up well. When it becomes clear her children will not visit, Vera lashes out at her hired help, calming only after Dolores confronts her over the unjust firing of one of the maids.

On the day of the eclipse, Dolores buys Joe a bottle of scotch and makes him a sandwich, lowering his guard, and they share their first moment of affection in many years. As the eclipse begins, Dolores has a vision of a young girl who is being sexually abused by her father. Reminded of what she has set out to do, she deliberately enrages Joe by claiming she has recovered the money he had stolen, provoking him into attacking her. She flees, leading Joe to the well and tricking him into stepping on the rotted boards that cover it. The planks break, and Joe falls into the well, severely injured.

Joe calls out for help for some time before eventually losing consciousness. Dolores returns to the house and falls asleep. She has a nightmare, then checks the well. She discovers that Joe has regained consciousness and has nearly managed to climb out. He grabs at Dolores and attempts to pull her in. She hits him in the face with a rock, and he falls back in, dead.

Dolores reports Joe missing, and his body is found after several days. His death is ruled an accident despite the suspicions of the local coroner. Dolores's actions damage her relationship with Selena, who is suspicious. Rumors begin to circulate that she has gotten away with murder.

In the present, Dolores reveals the circumstances of Vera's death. She confesses that Vera, during one of her hallucinations, managed to leave her wheelchair and fell down a flight of stairs. As she falls, Dolores has a terrifying vision of Joe's ghost. Still alive and lucid in spite of her injuries, Vera begs Dolores to help end her suffering. Dolores fetches a rolling pin, meaning to dispatch her, but Vera dies before she can use it. The incriminating scene is discovered by the local mailman, who called the police.

That night, Dolores is harassed by members of the community who believe she has already escaped punishment for murder in the past. The next day, she receives a phone call from Vera's lawyer, who informs Dolores that she has inherited Vera's entire fortune—nearly $30 million. Dolores initially refuses the money, believing it should go to Vera's estranged children, but learns that the children were killed in a car crash in 1961, and that Vera has spent the last thirty years of her life pretending that they were alive. Knowing the inheritance will be seen as a motive and worsen the case against her, Dolores realizes that the only way to clear her name is to confess. Feeling at peace with herself at long last, she ends her statement.

Several newspaper articles provide an epilogue to the story, revealing that Dolores was cleared of any blame in Vera's death and has anonymously donated Vera's fortune to the New England Home for Little Wanderers. The final article implies that Dolores and Selena have reconciled and that Selena will be coming home for the first time in 20 years.

== Style ==
Atypically for a King novel, Dolores Claiborne has no chapters, double-spacing between paragraphs, or other section breaks; thus, the text is a single continuous narrative, which reads like the transcription of a spoken monologue. It is written entirely in the first person, in a local dialect.

== Themes ==
Unlike many other works by King, little focus is given here to the supernatural. Although supernatural occurrences are implied, the only such events that clearly occur in the book are two telepathic visions of a nameless young girl sexually victimized by her father, which, along with the solar eclipse backdrop, form a link to King's novel Gerald's Game.

== Reception ==
The book has been praised for its characterization of the main protagonist, although some reviewers are ambivalent about King's use of dialect.The Guardian refers to it as: "one of King’s most extraordinarily heartfelt books." Publishers Weekly says: "King, even without the trappings of horror and suspense, is a magnificent storyteller whose greatest strength has always been characterization."

== Adaptations ==
The novel was adapted into a 1995 film directed by Taylor Hackford. It starred Kathy Bates as Dolores, with Jennifer Jason Leigh as her daughter Selena, and Judy Parfitt as Vera Donovan. David Joss Buckley adapted the novel for the stage. It was produced in Germany and France and nominated for Globe De Crystal by Paris Premiere, 2007. Dolores Claiborne, the operatic adaptation of the novel composed by Tobias Picker to a libretto by J. D. McClatchy, premiered at San Francisco Opera on September 18, 2013, with Patricia Racette in the title role. In 2017, the New York City Opera performed the world premiere of a new chamber version of the opera at the 59E59 Theater, directed by Michael Capasso. In 2019, it was produced by the Boston University Opera Institute. The play has also been made into a couple of Finnish plays both called Doloreksen tunnustus: in 2009 presented by Tukkateatteri, and in 2012 presented by Ad Astra Teatteri.

== See also ==
- Solar eclipses in fiction
