= Gene Scheer =

American songwriter, librettist and lyricist (born 1958)

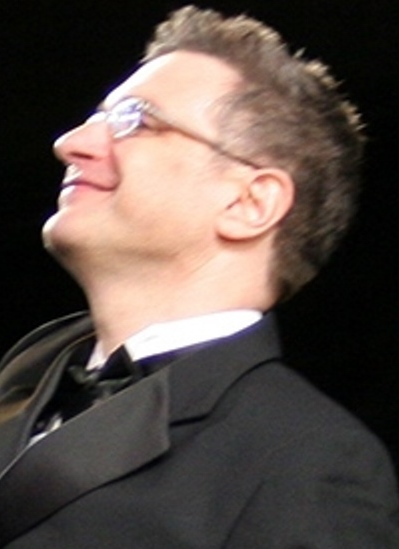
Scheer in 2005

Gene Scheer (born April 28, 1958) is an American songwriter, librettist and lyricist.

== Education and early career ==
Scheer was born in New York City. The son of two teachers, he was raised in Washington Township (Long Valley), New Jersey, and attended West Morris Central High School. He received his Bachelor of Music and Master of Music degrees at the Eastman School of Music in Rochester, New York, followed by a scholarship to the University of Cologne and a Rotary International Fellowship to study at the University of Music and Performing Arts Vienna. While in Europe, he worked as an actor and singer in leading roles at the Theater an der Wien, the Deutsches Theater in Munich and as director George Tabori's assistant at the Schauspiel Köln (Cologne).

== Operatic librettist ==
Scheer worked as a librettist with Tobias Picker on Thérèse Raquin (based on the 1866 novel by Émile Zola), commissioned by a consortium of companies including the Dallas Opera, San Diego Opera, and the Opéra de Montréal, and premiering in Dallas in November 2001, starring Diana Soviero. A revised version of Thérèse Raquin was performed in March 2006 at the Linbury Studio Theatre of the Royal Opera House, Covent Garden. Scheer collaborated again with Picker on An American Tragedy (based on the novel by Theodore Dreiser, which premiered at the Metropolitan Opera in 2005, starring Nathan Gunn, Patricia Racette, Susan Graham, Dolora Zajick and Jennifer Larmore.

Scheer has collaborated with the composer Jake Heggie on a number of projects, including the critically acclaimed Moby-Dick, which premiered at the Dallas Opera in April 2010, starring Ben Heppner and Stephen Costello. In February 2008, the Heggie-Scheer collaboration Last Acts (based on a play by Terrence McNally), opened at the Houston Grand Opera, starring Frederica von Stade. (Last Acts was subsequently retitled Three Decembers). They also collaborated on lyric dramas To Hell and Back commissioned and debuted by the Philharmonia Baroque Orchestra in November 2006, featuring soprano Isabel Bayrakdarian and Patti LuPone, and For a Look or a Touch, written for a baritone, actor, and chamber ensemble (debuted by the Seattle ensemble Music of Remembrance in 2007). In May 2012, Music of Remembrance premiered a Heggie/Scheer lyric drama based on the life of Krystyna Żywulska, an Auschwitz survivor.

Scheer worked with composer Jennifer Higdon on Cold Mountain, an operatic adaptation of the National Book Award-winning novel of the same name for the co-production by Santa Fe Opera in 2015 and by Opera Philadelphia in 2016.

He's also written the libretto for the opera Intelligence composed by Jake Heggie in 2023.

Scheer collaborated with Mason Bates for the operatic adaptation of Michael Chabon's 2000 novel The Amazing Adventures of Kavalier & Clay which premiered in 2024 at the Jacobs School of Music, Indiana University Bloomington. A substantially revised version opened the Metropolitan Opera's 2025–2026 season.

== Songs and song cycles ==
Also a composer in his own right, Scheer has written a number of songs for Renée Fleming, Sylvia McNair, Stephanie Blythe, Jennifer Larmore, Denyce Graves, and Nathan Gunn.

American Anthem, written by Scheer in 1998, was first performed by Denyce Graves for President Bill Clinton and Hillary Clinton at the Smithsonian Institution, launching President Clinton's “Save America's Treasures” initiative. The song was subsequently performed with the United States Army Band and Chorus at the opening ceremonies of the Millennium celebration on the Mall in Washington, D.C. Following 9/11, Denyce Graves performed American Anthem on The Oprah Winfrey Show and on Larry King Live. In June 2003, Patti LaBelle and Take 6 performed a new arrangement of American Anthem at a concert in Philadelphia, later aired on PBS. The song was also performed by Denyce Graves at the January 20, 2005, inauguration of George W. Bush. In 2007, the documentary filmmaker Ken Burns featured American Anthem (sung by Norah Jones) in the Emmy Award-winning World War II documentary for PBS, The War. American Anthem's lyrics were referenced and recited by President Joe Biden in his Inaugural Address on January 20, 2021, and revisited it again at the end of his DNC speech symbolically passing the torch of the presidency to Kamala Harris on August 20, 2024.

In 2003, Scheer was commissioned to write a choral version of his song Christmas Once More which was performed by the Chicago Symphony Orchestra and Chorus. This work was later performed by the Colorado Symphony and Chorus.

Scheer has also collaborated as a lyricist on a number of Jake Heggie song cycles. These works include: Pieces of 9/11 – Memories from Houston commissioned by the Houston Grand Opera in 2011; and A Question of Light, commissioned by the Dallas Opera and inspired by works of the Dallas Museum of Art (debuted by Nathan Gunn in Dallas, April 2011). In February 2012, the Alexander String Quartet and Joyce DiDonato premiered Camille Claudel: Into the Fire, by Heggie and Scheer, based on the life of the French sculptor Camille Claudel.

Other Scheer collaborations include the lyrics for Wynton Marsalis’s It Never Goes Away, featured in Mr. Marsalis’s 14-movement Congo Square suite.

== Oratorio ==
With the composer Steven Stucky, Scheer wrote the oratorio August 4, 1964. The work was premiered by the Dallas Symphony Orchestra in 2008 and was performed by the orchestra at Carnegie Hall in May 2011, with Jaap van Zweden conducting, during the inaugural “Spring for Music” festival. The concert-drama follows pivotal events of August 4, 1964, in the Lyndon B. Johnson White House: the discovery in Mississippi of the bodies of three murdered young civil rights workers and an alleged attack on American warships in the Gulf of Tonkin. Commissioned by the Dallas Symphony Orchestra in honor of President Johnson's centennial, the work is based on diaries, news reports and historical documents concerning the events of that day.
