= Dolores Claiborne (opera) =

2013 opera by Tobias Picker

- Opera by Tobias Picker
- Librettist: J. D. McClatchy
- Language: English
- Based on: Stephen King's Dolores Claiborne
- Premiere: September 18, 2013; San Francisco Opera

Dolores Claiborne is an opera in two acts composed by Tobias Picker to a libretto by J. D. McClatchy. Based Stephen King's 1992 novel Dolores Claiborne, the opera was commissioned by the San Francisco Opera and premiered in San Francisco on September 18, 2013. In 2017, the New York City Opera performed the world premiere of a new chamber version of the opera at the 59E59 Theater A, directed by Michael Capasso. In 2019, it was produced by the Boston University Opera Institute.

== Roles ==
Roles, voice types, premiere cast
Role	Voice type	Premiere cast, September 18, 2013 Conductor: George Manahan
Dolores Claiborne	mezzo-soprano	Patricia Racette
Vera Donovan	soprano	Elizabeth Futral
Joe St. George	bass-baritone	Wayne Tigges
Selena St. George	soprano	Susannah Biller
Detective Thibodeau	tenor	Greg Fedderly

== Synopsis ==
=== Act 1 ===
Dolores Claiborne is being interrogated about the recent death of Vera Donovan, a wealthy widow who employed Dolores as a maid for forty years. The police believe Dolores to be Vera's murderer, despite her claims to the contrary. While denying their accusations, she begins to tell the story of her life, her dead husband, and her estranged daughter. A series of flashbacks reveal that when she began working for Vera Donovan, Dolores was the victim of an abusive husband who, as she eventually learns, was also molesting their daughter. Vera and Dolores gradually develop a relationship during her first ten years of service. On the eve of a solar eclipse, Dolores confides in her employer about her husband and his abuse of both her and her daughter. Vera suggests Dolores take advantage of the up-coming eclipse to solve her problem, singing, "accidents can be an unhappy woman's best friend."

=== Act 2 ===
The second act opens with Dolores preparing food and liquor for watching the solar eclipse with her husband. When her husband appears she provokes him into a rage, running off into the woods. While in pursuit, Dolores' husband falls into a well she had concealed with branches earlier. Dolores covers the well with planks, leaving her husband inside to die. Back in the present, the interrogation of Dolores continues. She is joined by Selena, her now adult daughter, who tells the police Dolores could not have murdered Vera as the two had become very close after 40 years together. Shortly after it is revealed that Vera left her entire estate to Dolores, though Dolores curses her name in response. Back at her home, Selena asks her mother what really happened to Vera Donovan. The next scene reveals that Vera took her own life, throwing herself down a flight of stairs when Dolores was not looking. In the end, Selena leaves Dolores alone yet again, still having not forgiven her for the murder of her father.

== Reviews ==
Zachary Woolfe from the New York Times said:

There are lovely details throughout. Early in the first act, Vera’s admonition to her maids about properly hanging the sheets to dry, set to angular jitters, opens up into sumptuous ardor, then closes again into anxiety, with an ease of transition that recalls Janacek. The collaborators have invented an ingeniously creepy nursery rhyme for Joe (the resonant, fearless bass-baritone Wayne Tigges) to sing as he molests Selena, with a translucent, percussive accompaniment.
