= Lili Elbe (opera) =

2023 opera by Tobias Picker

- Opera by Tobias Picker
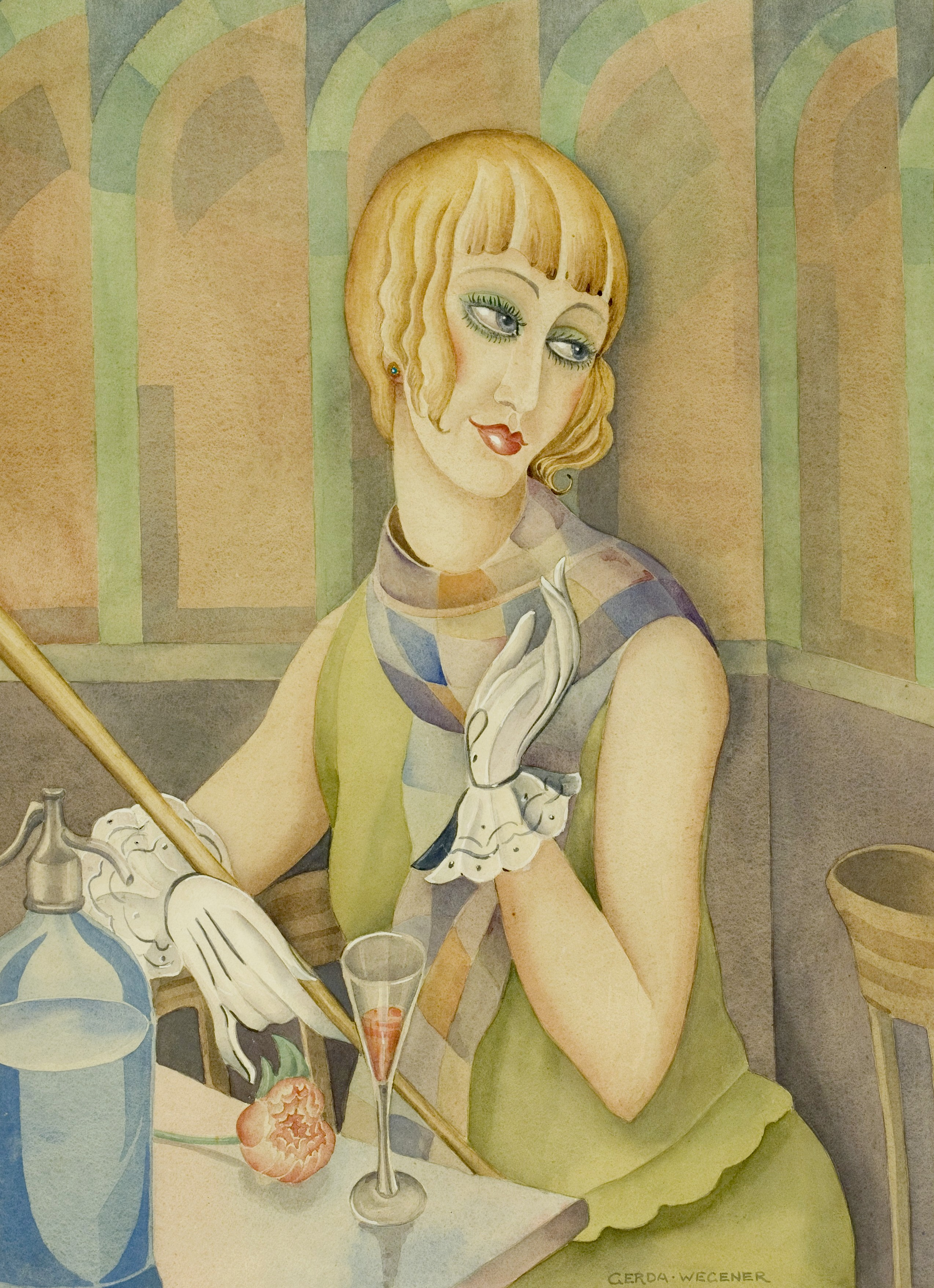
- Lili Elbe by Gerda Wegener
- Librettist: Aryeh Lev Stollman
- Language: English
- Based on: Man into Woman: An Authentic Record of a Change of Sex by Lili Elbe
- Premiere: October 23, 2023; Theater St. Gallen, St. Gallen, Switzerland

Lili Elbe is an opera in two acts composed by Tobias Picker, with a libretto by Aryeh Lev Stollman, starring Lucia Lucas as Lili Elbe. Based on the life of Lili Elbe and her book Man into Woman: An Authentic Record of a Change of Sex, the opera premiered on 22 October 2023, and received "Best World Premiere" in the 2023 Oper! Awards. In 2026, Lili Elbe had its American premiere at the Santa Fe Opera.

== Roles ==
Roles, premiere cast
Role	Premier cast, 2023 Conductor: Modestas Pitrėnas
Lili Elbe	Lucia Lucas
Gerda Wegener	Sylvia D'Eramo
Anna Larsen Bjørner, Mother Wegener, Young Woman	Mack Wolz
Hélène Allatini	Jennifer Panara
Claude Lejeune	Brian Michael Moore
Danish Countess, Dagmar, Matron	Théo Imart
Marius Wegener	Sam Taskinen
Christian X, Art Critic, Major Fernando Porta	Kristján Jóhannesson
Eric Allatini	David Maze
Professor Warnekros	Msimelelo Mbali

== Development ==
Tobias Picker met Lucia Lucas when he cast her in the title role of Don Giovanni, making her the first transgender opera singer to have a leading role on the American stage.
