= Awakenings (opera) =

Opera by Tobias Picker

- Opera by Tobias Picker
- Librettist: Aryeh Lev Stollman
- Language: English
- Based on: Oliver Sacks' Awakenings
- Premiere: June 5, 2022; Opera Theatre of Saint Louis, St. Louis, Missouri

Awakenings is an opera in two acts composed by Tobias Picker, with a libretto by Aryeh Lev Stollman. Based on Awakenings, Oliver Sacks' 1960's chronicle of his efforts to help the victims of an encephalitis epidemic, the opera was commissioned by the Opera Theatre of Saint Louis, and premiered on June 5, 2022. The East Coast premiere of Awakenings was performed by Odyssey Opera in partnership with Boston Modern Orchestra Project, conducted by Gil Rose and directed by James Robinson, on February 25, 2023, at the newly renovated Huntington Theater.

== Roles ==
Role	Voice	Premier cast, 2022 Conductor: Roberto Kalb
Dr. Oliver Sacks	Baritone	Jarrett Porter
Dr. Podsnap	Bass	David Pittsinger
Mr. Rodriguez	Tenor	Andres Acosta
Rose	Soprano	Susanna Phillips
Miriam	Mezzo-Soprano	Adrienne Danrich
Leonard Lev	Tenor	Marc Molomot
Iris	Mezzo-Soprano	Katharine Goeldner
Ruth	Soprano	Rachel Blaustein
Dr. Samuel Sacks	Bass Baritone	Keith Klein
Dr. Muriel Else Landau	Contralto	Elissa Pfaender
Ms. Kohl	Soprano	Angel Azzarra
Frank	Tenor	Jared Esguerra
Lucy	Mezzo-Soprano	Daniela Magura

== Development ==
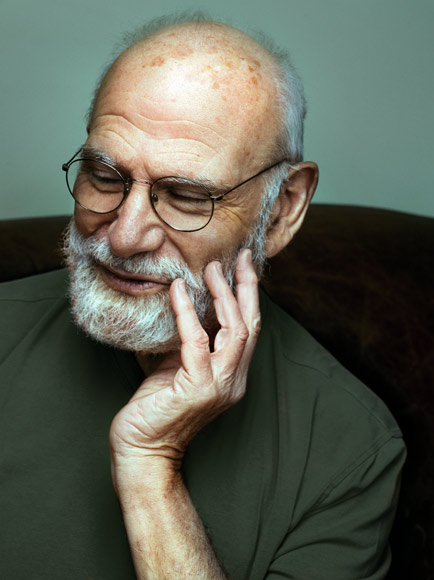
Oliver Sacks

Picker originally met Oliver Sacks at a dinner party. Picker, whose Tourette's syndrome went undiagnosed until he was in his thirties, was interested in Sacks's opinion of his symptoms. Soon becoming close friends, Picker and Sacks served as mutual inspirations for one another: Picker was interested in Sacks's intellect and compassion, while Sacks was fascinated by Picker's creativity, Tourette's, and musicianship. Picker would become one of the subjects of Sack's book Musicophilia: Tales of Music and the Brain:

Tobias Picker, the distinguished composer, also has Tourette's. but when he is composing or playing the piano or conducting, his tics disappear. I have watched him as he sits almost motionless for hours, orchestrating one of his études for piano at his computer ... Picker writes in every mode—the dreamy and tranquil no less than the violent and stormy—and moves from one mood to another with consummate ease.

In 2010, Picker composed a ballet, Awakenings, for the Rambert Dance Company, inspired by the book by Oliver Sacks. Later in the decade, Picker and his husband, the novelist and neurologist Aryeh Lev Stollman, began to develop an opera based upon Awakenings.
