= Judith Bettina =

American soprano and music educator

- Occupations: Singer, composer, educator
- Known for: Soprano, classical music

Judith Bettina is an American soprano and music educator, particularly noted for her performances and recordings of contemporary classical music.

== Life and career ==
Bettina was born in Manhattan to a violinist mother, Lilo Kantorowicz Glick, and a violist father, Jacob Glick, who was noted for his championship of new music. She earned her bachelor's and master's degrees from New York's Manhattan School of Music. While there she performed in the school's 1975 premiere of Wuorinen's The W. of Babylon. After graduation from the Manhattan School of Music, she sang in New York City but moved to Stanford University in 1986.

She is married to pianist James Goldsworthy whom she met at Stanford where she was on the music faculty from 1986 until 1993. The two often perform together both in concerts and recordings. Many of the works they perform together were written specifically for them.

Amongst the noted composers who have written works for Bettina's voice are Charles Wuorinen, Milton Babbitt, Richard Danielpour, and Tobias Picker. Picker, who has described Judith Bettina as "his muse of many years”, wrote his first song for her, a setting of a poem by Goethe.

Bettina is a faculty member of the Mannes School of Music.
