= Il caso Mortara =

Opera by Francesco Cilluffo

Il caso Mortara (The Mortara Case) is an opera in two acts composed by Francesco Cilluffo to an Italian-language libretto by the composer himself, inspired by The Kidnapping of Edgardo Mortara by David Kertzer. The opera was commissioned by the Dicapo Opera Theater, New York, and premiered in February 2010. It is the first Italian opera commissioned to an Italian composer by a New York opera company since the times of Giacomo Puccini at the Metropolitan Opera. New York Times critic Anthony Tommasini hailed it as one of the most important events of New York's 2010 operatic season.

== Roles ==
Role	Voice type	Premiere cast, 25 February 2010 (Conductor: Pacien Mazzagatti)
Salomone Mortara	tenor	Peter Furlong
Marianna Mortara	mezzo-soprano	Iulia Merca
Pope Pius IX	bass-baritone	Chad Armstrong
Edgardo Mortara	baritone	Christopher DeVage
Rachele	soprano	Christina Rohm
Riccardo Mortara	tenor	Ubaldo Feliciano-Hernandez
Inquisitor Feletti	bass	Tom McNichols
Guard / Priest / Cardinal #1	baritone	Daniel Quintana
Guard / Priest / Cardinal #2	baritone	Michael Callas
Edgardo Mortara (child)	mute role	Jake Glickman
