= Awakenings (book) =

1973 book by Oliver Sacks

- Front cover of first UK edition, Duckworth & Co., 1973
- Author: Oliver Sacks
- Language: English
- Subject: Neurology, psychology
- Genre: Case history
- Publisher: Duckworth & Co., 1973; Pelican, 1976; Picador, 1991, 2006, 2010
- Publication date: 1973, revised 1976 and 1991
- Publication place: United States
- Pages: 408 (First edition)
- ISBN: 0-375-70405-1
- OCLC: 21910570
- Preceded by: Migraine (1970)
- Followed by: A Leg to Stand On (1984)

Awakenings is a 1973 book by Oliver Sacks. It recounts the life histories of those who had been victims of the 1920s encephalitis lethargica epidemic. Sacks chronicles his efforts in the late 1960s to help these patients at the Beth Abraham Hospital (now Beth Abraham Center for Rehabilitation and Nursing) in the Bronx, New York. The treatment used the new drug L-DOPA, with the observed effects on the patients' symptoms being generally dramatic but temporary.

In 1982, Sacks wrote:

I have become much more optimistic than I was when I […] wrote Awakenings, for there has been a significant number of patients who, following the vicissitudes of their first years on L-DOPA, came to do – and still do – extremely well. Such patients have undergone an enduring awakening, and enjoy possibilities of life which had been impossible, unthinkable, before the coming of L-DOPA.

The 1976 edition of the book is dedicated to the memory of Sacks's close friend the poet W. H. Auden, and bears an extract from Auden's 1969 poem The Art of Healing:

'Healing',
Papa would tell me,
'is not a science,
but the intuitive art
of wooing Nature.'

Auden himself called Awakenings a masterpiece. In 1974 the book won the Hawthornden Prize.

According to a December 2025 article in the New Yorker, the book was "met with silence or skepticism by other neurologists", and Sacks' findings could not be replicated. Sacks wrote in his private journal that some details of the book were “pure fabrications.” Lawrence Weschler, who was preparing a biography of Sacks, visited the patients described in the book and found "a lot of people shitting in their pants, drooling."

== In popular culture ==
The book inspired a play, two films, a ballet and an opera:

- 1974: the documentary film Awakenings, produced by Duncan Dallas for Yorkshire Television as the first episode and pilot of the British television programme Discovery. The documentary won a Red Ribbon at the 1978 American Film Festival and first prize at the 1978 International Rehabilitation Film Festival.
- 1982: the play A Kind of Alaska by Harold Pinter, performed as part of a trilogy of Pinter's plays titled Other Places.
- 1990: the Oscar-nominated film Awakenings, starring Robert De Niro and Robin Williams.
- 2010: the ballet Awakenings, composed by Tobias Picker for the Rambert Dance Company, and premiered by Rambert in Salford, UK.
- 2022: the opera Awakenings, also composed by Picker, commissioned by Opera Theatre of Saint Louis, with a libretto by Picker's husband Aryeh Lev Stollman, premiered on 11 June 2022.
