= Keys To The City (orchestral work) =

- by Tobias Picker
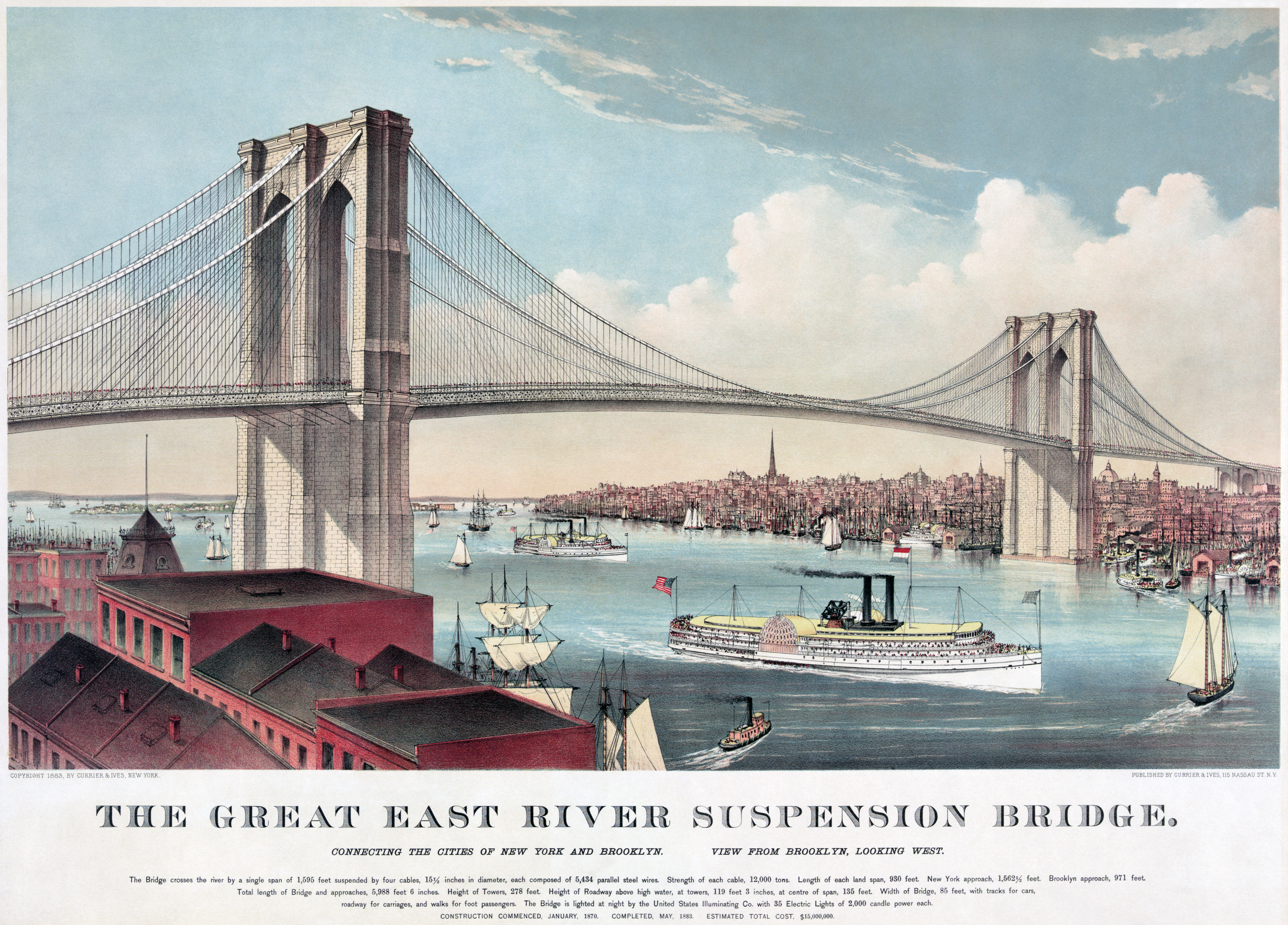
- Chromolithograph of the Brooklyn Bridge
- Genre: Modernist
- Occasion: 100th Anniversary of The Brooklyn Bridge
- Commissioned by: Brooklyn Bridge Centennial Commission
- Composed: 1983
- Performed: May 24, 1983: Brooklyn Bridge
- Movements: 1

Keys To The City is a one-movement orchestral concerto for piano and orchestra written by the American composer Tobias Picker for the Brooklyn Bridge Centennial.

== Commission and history ==
Picker, at the time in his late twenties, received a commission from The Brooklyn Bridge Centennial Commission to compose a work for the bridge's centennial. To prepare, Picker said:

I read Hart Crane and McCullough's "The Great Bridge." I studied its history. Visiting the bridge at different times of day and night, I observed its structure, its content and its context. I watched the light play through cables composed of billions of strands of streel. I listened from the foot bridge to the whine of the cars below. I studied paintings, poems, and songs which had been made in tribute to the bridge over the years. I even gave a champagne party for my friends on it one starry midnight. And I composed furiously.

Keys To The City premiered on May 24, 1983, at the Fulton Ferry Landing underneath Brooklyn Bridge.
