= The Encantadas (orchestral work) =

Orchestral composition written Tobias Picker

- by Tobias Picker
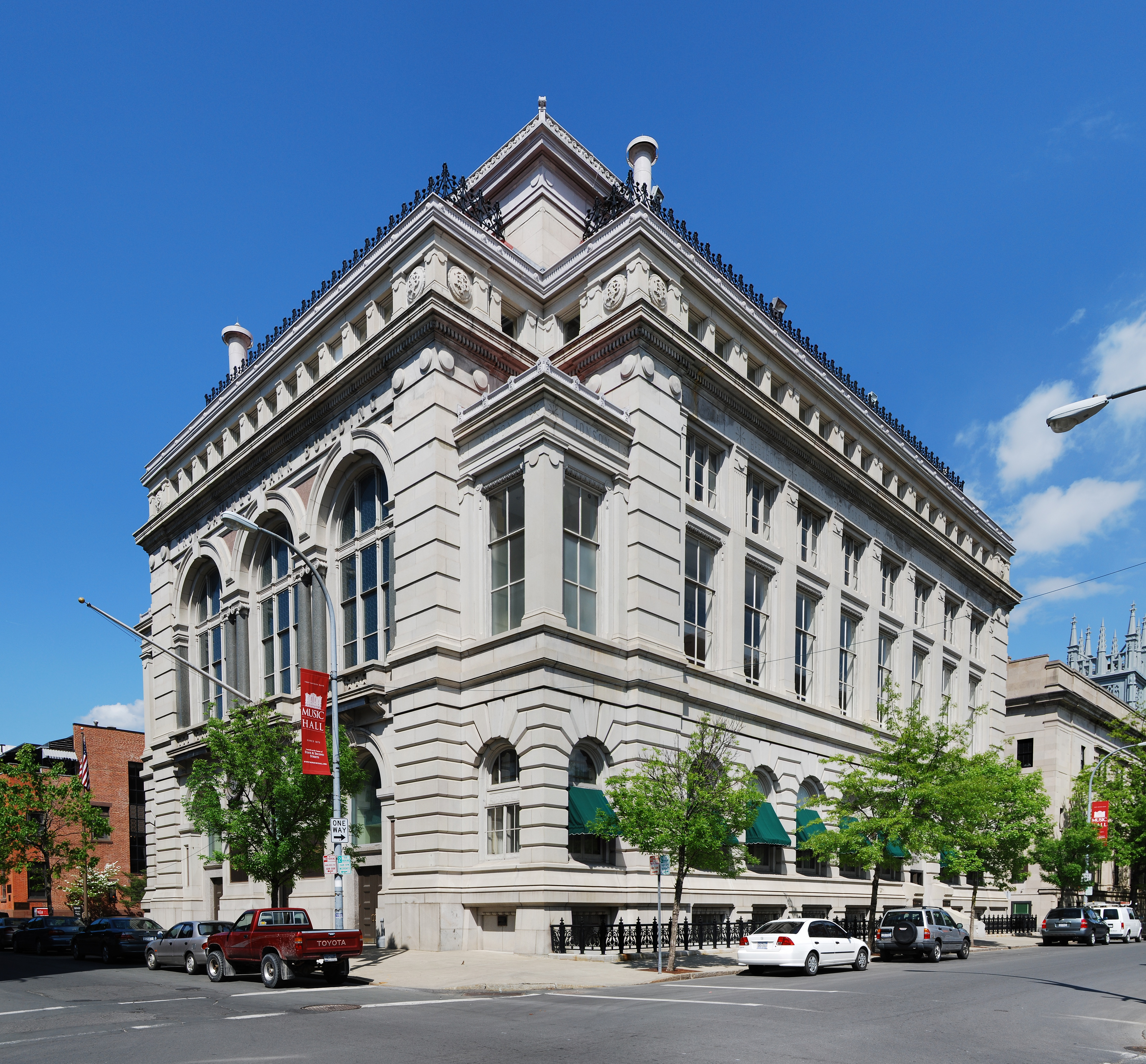
- The Troy Savings Bank Music Hall
- Genre: Modernist
- Occasion: 175th Anniversary of The Albany Symphony Orchestra
- Commissioned by: Albany Symphony Orchestra
- Composed: 1983
- Performed: October 14, 1983: Palace Theatre, Troy Savings Bank Music Hall
- Movements: 6

The Encantadas is an orchestral composition written by the American composer Tobias Picker in 1984 for the Albany Symphony Orchestra.

== History ==
Drawn from Herman Melville's descriptions of the Galapagos Islands, The Encantadas was commissioned by the Albany Academy in celebration of its 175th anniversary. It was premiered by the Albany Symphony Orchestra on October 14 and 15, 1983, at the Troy Savings Bank Music Hall and the Albany Palace Theatre with Michael Arkin as Narrator, conducted by Julius Hegyi.

The Encantadas has been recorded by the Houston Symphony, with Christoph Eschenbach as conductor and John Gielgud as narrator, as well as by the Nashville Symphony Orchestra, led by Giancarlo Guerrero.

== Movements ==
The Encantadas is in six movements:

1. Dream
2. Desolation
3. Delusion
4. Diversity
5. Din
6. Dawn

== Influence ==
Oliver Sacks, a personal friend of Picker, wrote of the inspiration he took from Picker's music in the preface to his book, Island of the Color Blind, saying he "owe[d] a special debt to Tobias Picker's version of The Encantadas, and that "whenever, in the writing, memory failed me, listening to the piece operated as a sort of Proustian mnemonic, transporting me back to the Marianas and the Carolines."
