= Henriette Simon Picker =

American artist (1917–2016)

H. S. Picker
- Picker in 2012
- Born: Henriette Simon Picker; 28 March 1917; Jersey City, New Jersey, U.S.
- Died: 5 January 2016 (aged 98); Poughkeepsie, New York, U.S.
- Children: Ida Picker, Jon Picker, Tobias Picker

Henriette Simon Picker (28 March 1917 – 5 January 2016) was an American painter, fashion designer, and inventor.

== Biography ==
Andy Warhol illustration of Picker's shoe design in McCall's

Picker's patent illustration for the "Tubular Stripping Shoe"

Henriette Simon Picker was born on March 28, 1917, to German-Jewish émigrés in Jersey City, New Jersey. In 1928, after a failed business venture, her father, William, moved his family to Berlin. There Picker graduated from the Paul-Natorp-Gymnasium and later attended the Lette-Verein. After fleeing Germany following the rise of Hitler, the family resettled in New York, where Picker studied drawing and painting with Alexander Brook and Louis Bouché at the Art Students League of New York while pursuing a career as a shoe designer. At the age of sixteen, she became the first woman designer hired by I. Miller, a shoe company. In 1952 Picker opened her own business called "Simone Shoes To Match" with her brother Regi Simon, designing and manufacturing shoes for women to match their handbags and dresses. In the October 1952 issue of MaCall's, her shoes were illustrated by a then 24 year old Andy Warhol. In the 1960s she formed one of the first shoe import businesses in the US, and designed her own line, “Simone Shoes, Made in Italy.” In 1982, Picker retired from shoe design to care for her then-ailing husband, Julian Picker. Soon thereafter, in 1983, Picker was commissioned to create the cover for the January 1983 issue of Footwear News. Over the course of her career, Picker patented numerous shoe designs.

Picker produced the bulk of her paintings in her nineties. Her first solo exhibition was at the age of 95 at The Hudson River Studio in 2012, and shortly after was the subject of a retrospective exhibition at PMW Gallery in March 2013. She subsequently had solo exhibitions at The Cooperstown Art Association and View Arts in Old Forge, NY. She also exhibited at the Waxlander Gallery in Santa Fe and the Carter Burden Gallery in Chelsea. Picker's final years were almost entirely focused upon portraiture, including Ruth Bader Ginsburg, Mikael Karlsson (composer), Richard Croft (tenor), Ida Rohatyn, and Charles Wuorinen. A book chronicling her work entitled Henriette Simon Picker: A Century of Painting was published posthumously.

In 1940, she married Julian Picker who was a newswriter for CBS TV. They had three children, Ida Picker, Jon Picker, and Tobias Picker.
