= Roberto Kalb =

Mexican-born conductor

- Born: Mexico
- Education: San Francisco Conservatory of Music; University of Michigan; New England Conservatory of Music
- Occupation: Conductor
- Spouse: Mane Galoyan
- Website: robertokalb.com

Roberto Kalb is a Mexican-born conductor, composer, and pianist. He currently works as the music director for Detroit Opera. As a conductor, he is praised for his musicianship and clarity.

== Education ==
Kalb attended the San Francisco Conservatory of Music, receiving a Bachelor of Arts in composition. He then attended the University of Michigan, receiving a Masters of Music in composition. He later pursued a dual Doctoral of Musical Arts in Composition from The New England Conservatory of Music and conducting from the University of Michigan. In 2012, Kalb was awarded The American Prize in orchestral composition for his piece, Mascaras. He has also received several other distinctions, including 2nd place in the Washington International Composition Competition, and first place in the Ann Arbor Symphony Sight and Sound Competition.

== Career ==
In 2021, Kalb was the recipient of the Solti Foundation U.S. Career Assistantship Award.

On June 5, 2022, Kalb conducted Opera Theatre of Saint Louis's premiere of American composer Tobias Picker's opera Awakenings. Later that year, in November, he was appointed the second Music Director of Detroit Opera following David DiChiera's tenure in the role.

== Personal life ==
Kalb is married to soprano Mane Galoyan.

== Compositions ==
- Mascaras (orchestra)
- Le Dormeur du Val (piano trio)
- Ryden Scenes (string quartet)
- String Quartet No. 1
