= Theater St. Gallen =

- Theater St. Gallen
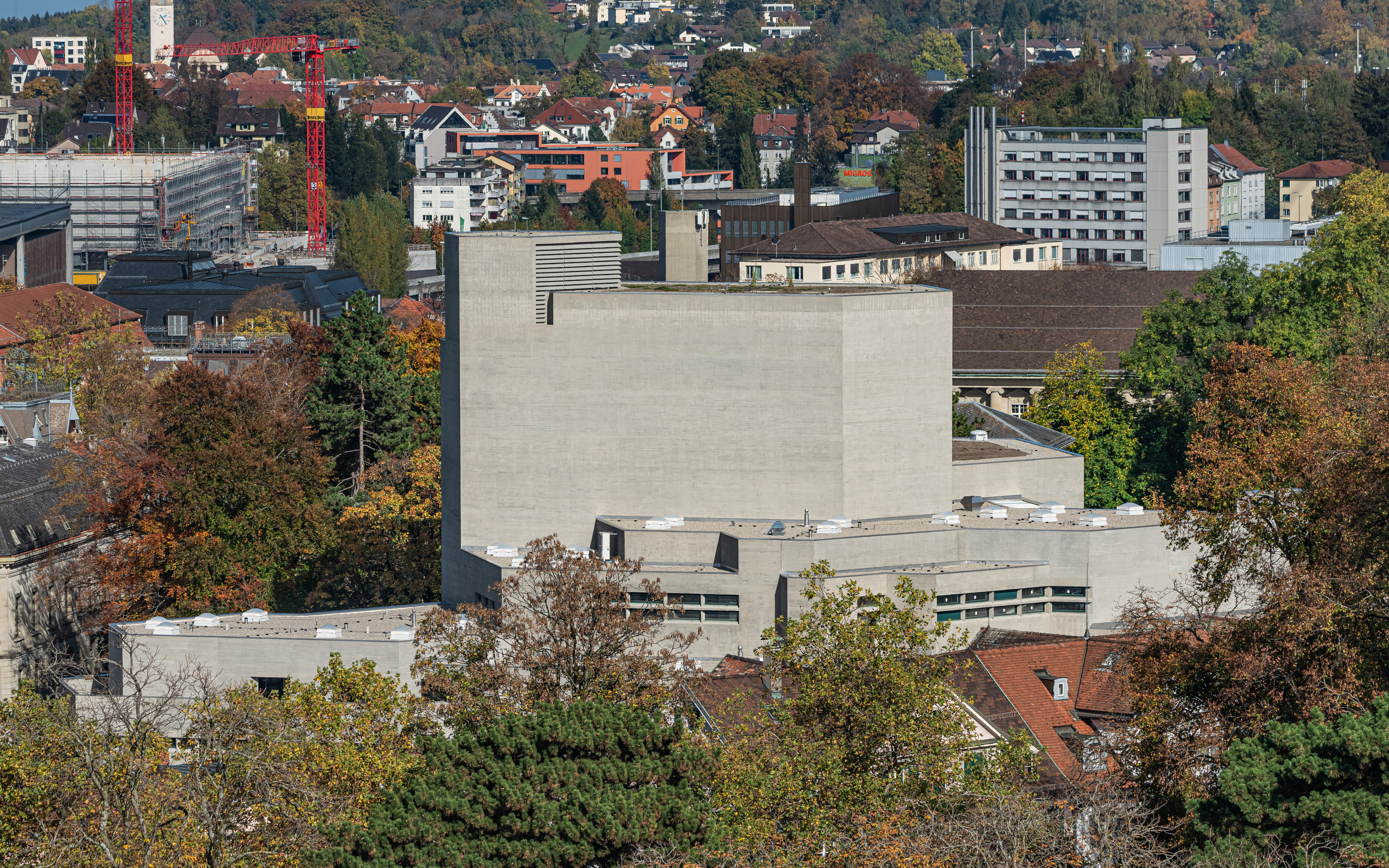
- The Theater St. Gallen

- Location within Canton of St. Gallen Theater St. Gallen (Switzerland)
- Alternative names: Grosses Haus

General information
- Status: Completed
- Type: Theater
- Location: Museumstrasse 24, St. Gallen, Switzerland
- Coordinates: 47°25′37″N 9°22′50″E
- Opened: 15 March 1968

Design and construction
- Architect: Claude Paillard

Other information
- Seating capacity: 742

Website
- www.theatersg.ch/de/

Swiss Cultural Property of National Significance

The Theater St. Gallen is a performing arts center for opera, musical, ballet, and theatre in St. Gallen, Switzerland, and considered to be the oldest professional theatre in Switzerland. It is a Swiss heritage site of national significance.

== History ==
Although the monks Tutilo and Notker already inspired briefly lay theatre in St. Gallen during the Middle Ages, theatre did not flourish for a long time because of moral concerns. In the early 19th century interest in theatre was reawakened. After the first performance on 14 October 1801, in modest surroundings, a "Theater Stock Company" was founded in 1805 to support a local professional theatre group. When they needed a larger place for their performances, the architect Johann Christoph Kunkler built a theater into which the group moved in 1857. This "Kunkler-Bau" remained the home of the formerly called Stadttheater St. Gallen for 111 years until 1968. The building was then demolished.

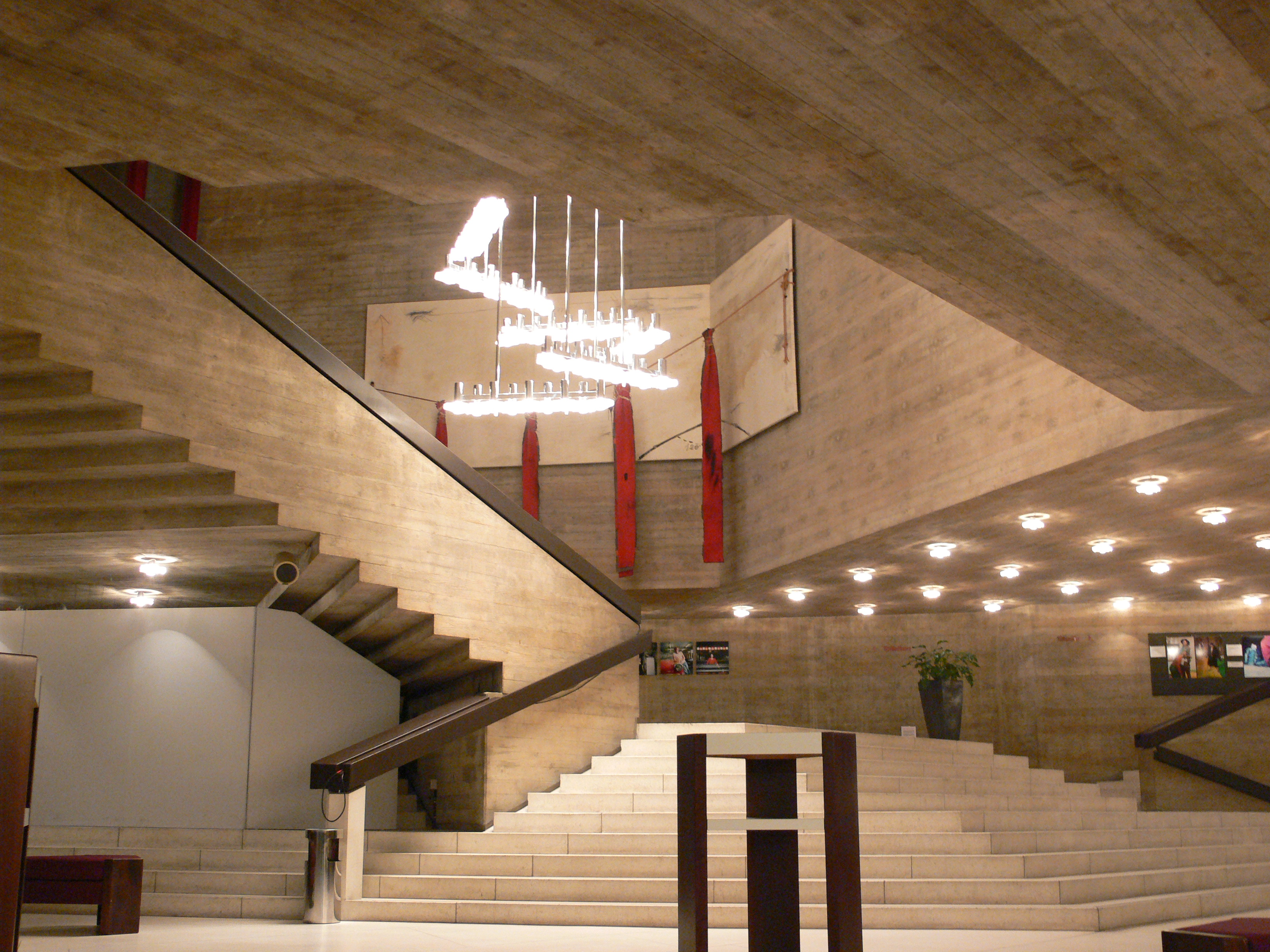
The staircase

The current building was designed by the Swiss architect Claude Paillard and inaugurated with Beethoven's Fidelio on 15 March 1968. The building houses two stages, the larger one allows 742 persons and the studio 100 persons to attend.

With the construction of the new building, the stock company was replaced by a consortium with participation of the town of St. Gallen and its canton. Surrounding communities thereafter joined in the venture. The "Genossenschaft Konzert und Theater St. Gallen" ("Cooperative for concert and theatre of St. Gallen") has been since 2000 the supporting organization for the orchestre and theatre of St. Gallen. The "Sinfonieorchester St. Gallen" therefore provides orchestral support for operas and musicals.

Each year about 20 new productions are introduced. Among them, in 2009, the theater featured the world premiere of The Count of Monte Cristo, a musical by Frank Wildhorn. The theatre's 390 annual performances are seen by about 140,000 attendees.

Lili Elbe, composed by Tobias Picker, will premiere in St. Gallen in 2023-24 Season.
