= Old and Lost Rivers =

- by Tobias Picker
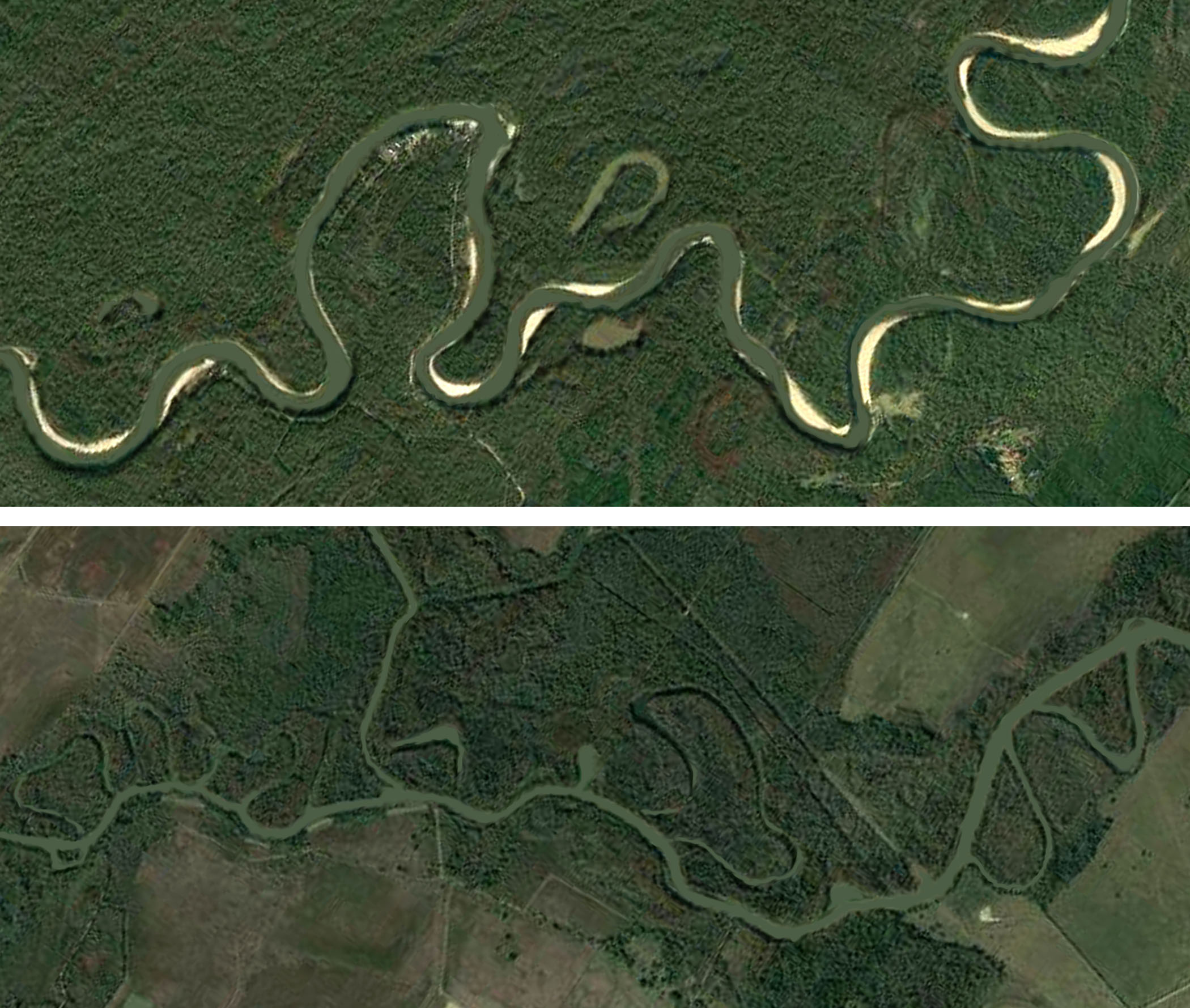
- View of the Trinity River in Chambers County, Texas
- Genre: Modernist
- Occasion: 150th anniversary of Texan independence
- Commissioned by: Houston Symphony
- Composed: 1986
- Performed: April 4, 1986: Jones Hall, Houston

Old and Lost Rivers is a short orchestral composition by the American composer Tobias Picker.

The work was commissioned to commemorate the sesquicentenary of Texas by the Houston Symphony, for which Picker had recently been appointed composer-in-residence. The work was composed in the spring of 1986 and was given its world premiere by the Houston Symphony under the conductor Sergiu Comissiona in Jones Hall, Houston on May 9, 1986. Later that year, Picker adapted the work for solo piano as a birthday present for the pianist Ursula Oppens; this rendition of the work was premiered by Oppens at Carnegie Hall in March 1987.

The piece is dedicated to Stephen M. Aechternacht and is one of Picker's most frequently performed compositions.

== Composition ==
Old and Lost Rivers is composed in a single movement and has a duration of roughly six minutes. Picker described the inspiration for the piece in the score program notes, writing:

Driving east from Houston along Interstate 10, you will come to a high bridge which crosses many winding bayous. These bayous were left behind by the great wanderings, over time, of the Trinity River across the land. When it rains, the bayous fill with water and begin to flow. At other times — when it is dry — they evaporate and turn green in the sun. The two main bayous are called 'Old River' and 'Lost River'. Where they converge, a sign on the side of the highway reads: 'Old and Lost Rivers'.

Heading west, the sign reads "Lost and Old River", as the Lost River is crossed first.

=== Instrumentation ===
The work is scored for a large orchestra comprising three flutes (doubling piccolo), two oboes, three clarinets (doubling bass clarinet), three bassoons, six horns, three trumpets, tuba, timpani, percussion, harp, piano, and strings.

== Reception ==
Old and Lost Rivers has been praised by music critics. John von Rhein of the Chicago Tribune described it as "a tranquil meditation that suggests Copland in his lyrical-pastoral vein." Andrew Achenbach described the piece as "wonderful" and called it "a haunting miniature, full of a sultry nostalgia which seems to distil the very essence of America's Deep South."

== Recordings ==
The orchestral version of Old and Lost Rivers has twice been commercially recorded. The first recording was performed by the Houston Symphony under the conductor Christoph Eschenbach and released through Virgin Classics in 1991. The second recording was performed by the London Symphony Orchestra under John Williams and released through Sony BMG in 1997.
