= Lucia Lucas =

American transgender baritone

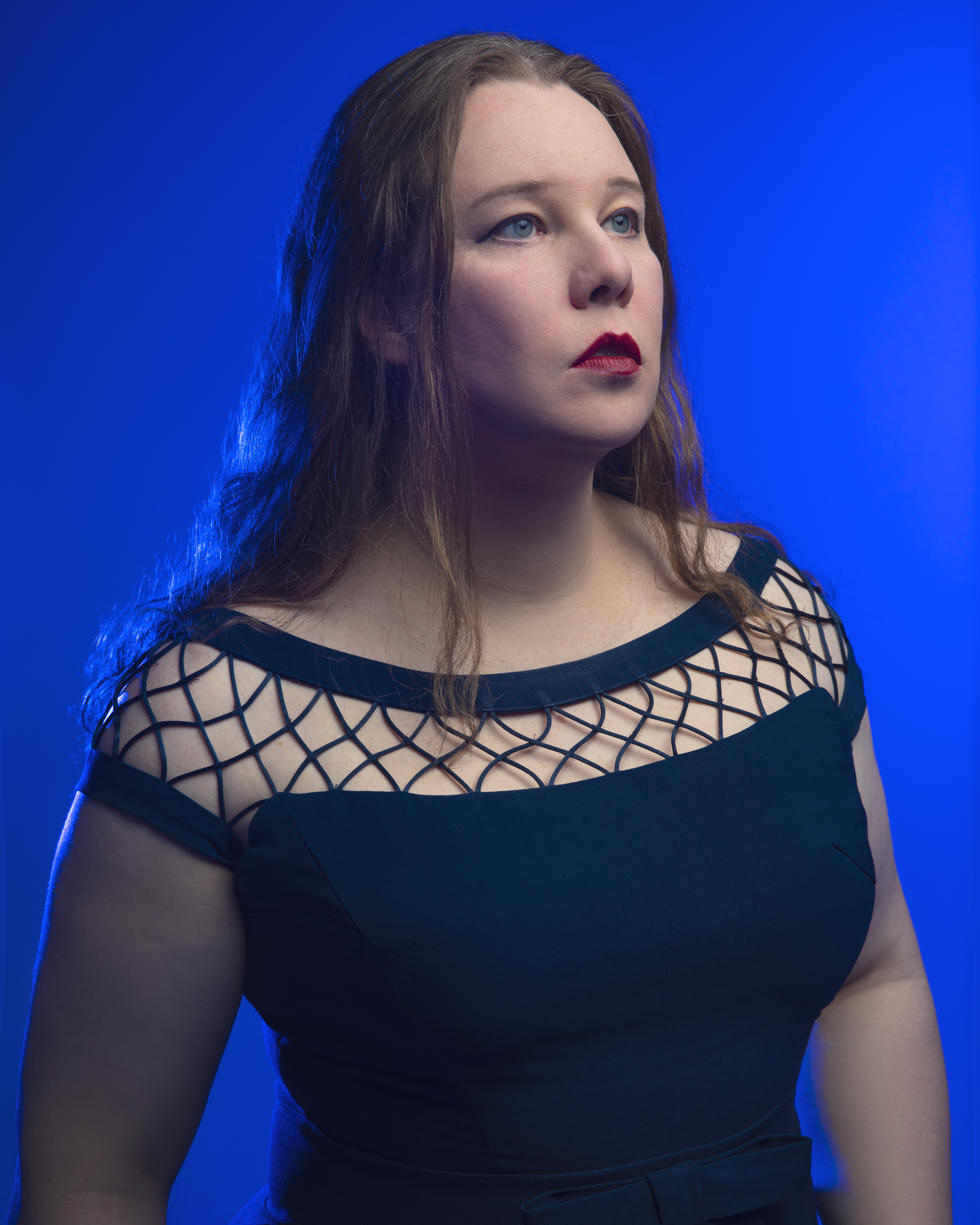
- Lucia Lucas (2019)
- Born: July 3, 1980 (age 46); Sacramento, California, U.S.
- Occupation: Classical Baritone

Lucia Lucas (born July 3, 1980) is an American transgender baritone. On March 1, 2018, it was announced that she would become the first transgender person to perform a principal role on an American operatic stage.

== Biography ==
Lucas grew up in Sacramento, California. She studied French horn and voice at California State University, Sacramento and then did graduate work at the Chicago College of Performing Arts. She moved to Germany in 2009. She began her transition in November 2013. She began to take estrogen and antiandrogens in July 2014, and underwent facial feminization surgery in September. In 2016, she had gender reassignment surgery.

On May 3, 2019, in Tulsa, Oklahoma, Lucas starred in Mozart's Don Giovanni with the Tulsa Opera. The performance is the subject of the 2020 feature documentary The Sound of Identity, directed by James Kicklighter. Subsequently, Lucas became the first transgender baritone to appear with the English National Opera in London on 5 October 2019, playing Public Opinion in Orpheus in the Underworld at the London Coliseum.

Lucas played Lili Elbe in the world premiere of Tobias Picker’s new opera, Lili Elbe on October 22, 2023.

== Personal life ==
Lucia Lucas married contralto Ariana Lucas in 2009.
