= An American Tragedy (opera) =

Opera by Tobias Picker

- Opera by Tobias Picker
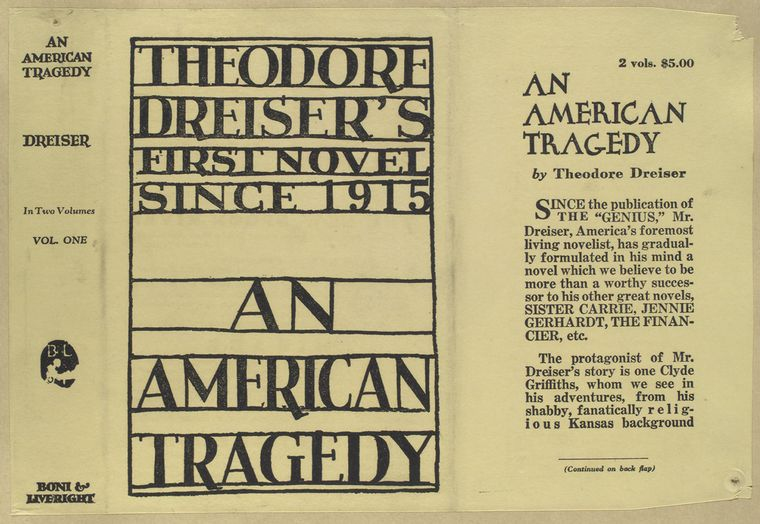
- Front cover of Dreiser's An American Tragedy
- Librettist: Gene Scheer
- Language: English
- Based on: Theodore Dreiser's An American Tragedy
- Premiere: December 2, 2005; Metropolitan Opera, New York City

An American Tragedy is an opera in two acts composed by Tobias Picker, with a libretto by Gene Scheer. This was Picker's fourth opera, written four years after the debut of Thérèse Raquin (also composed with Scheer). Based on the 1925 Theodore Dreiser novel, An American Tragedy, the opera was commissioned by the Metropolitan Opera, and premiered in New York City on December 2, 2005.

It received its West Coast premiere by the Santa Monica College Opera Theater in 2010, and was produced at the Glimmerglass Festival in 2014.

== Roles ==
Role	Voice	Premier Cast, 2005 (Conductor: James Conlon)
Roberta Alden	Soprano	Patricia Racette
Sondra Finchley	Mezzo-Soprano	Susan Graham
Clyde Griffiths	Baritone	Nathan Gunn
Elvira Griffiths	Mezzo-Soprano	Dolora Zajick
Elizabeth Griffiths	Mezzo-Soprano	Jennifer Larmore
Bella Griffiths	Soprano	Jennifer Aylmer
Samuel Griffiths	Tenor	Kim Begley
Gilbert Griffiths	Tenor	William Burden
Orville Mason	Baritone	Richard Bernstein
Grace Marr	Soprano	Clare Gormley
Young Clyde	Boy Soprano	Graham Phillips
Hortense	Soprano	Anna Christy

== Synopsis ==
This has been described as a progressive drama of temptation, responsibility, and faith. Clyde Griffiths, son of a Midwestern missionary, is a young man working as a bellhop in Chicago, where he flirts with young society women. He relocates to New York upon being offered a position in his Uncle Samuel's shirt factory. Wasting no time, he pursues one of the young workers there, Roberta Alden, after being warned not to by fellow workers. Clyde quickly moves on to a new love interest in Sondra Finchley. Before long, Clyde is juggling Roberta and Sondra, but Roberta soon confides that she is pregnant. Clyde believes his true love is Sondra, and feels resentful of Roberta, who hopes to marry him. Clyde schemes to rid himself of the burden of an unwanted lover with a child on the way.

== Note from the composer ==
"Based on a true story, Theodore Dreiser's novel An American Tragedy is one literature's great, universal subjects. The central character Clyde Griffiths is Everyman, and his dilemma is at the heart of the American experience, then as well as now. The people upon whom Dreiser's characters were based also echo throughout the pages of the entire opera. They are the haunting spirits that made the story and the writing of the music 'real' for me. The heart-breaking hand-written letters of Grace Brown, the tragic real life factory worker Dreiser brings us so painfully close to, inspired me to give them song as they are projected onto the stage in all their endless optimism and sorrow."
