= Fantastic Mr. Fox (opera) =

Opera by Tobias Picker

- Opera by Tobias Picker
- Librettist: Donald Sturrock
- Language: English
- Based on: Roald Dahl's children's novel
- Premiere: December 9, 1998; Dorothy Chandler Pavilion of the Los Angeles Opera

Fantastic Mr. Fox is an opera in three acts composed by Tobias Picker to a libretto by Donald Sturrock based on Roald Dahl's children's novel of the same name. It was premiered by Los Angeles Opera at the Dorothy Chandler Pavilion on December 9, 1998.

In 2010, it was adapted into an abridged version with seven instrumentalists, and in 2011, a full-length version with the same reduced orchestration. In 2019, Fantastic Mr. Fox was recorded by the Boston Modern Orchestra Project and Odyssey Opera and released on Albany Records and was subsequently awarded the 2020 Grammy Award for Best Opera Recording.

== Performance history ==
Picker's second opera (after his 1996 Emmeline) Fantastic Mr Fox was commissioned by the Roald Dahl Foundation. It received its world premiere performance by the Los Angeles Opera on December 9, 1998.

In 2010, Stephen Barlow staged a new version of the work commissioned by Opera Holland Park especially designed to be performed promenade style in the gardens of Holland Park. This version, in an abridged form for seven instruments, starred Grant Doyle as Mr. Fox, Olivia Ray as Mrs. Fox, Laura Woods (Mezzo-Soprano) as Agnes The Digger, Jaimee Marshall as Miss Hedgehog, Henry Grant Kerswell, Peter Kent and John Lofthouse as Farmers Boggis, Bunce and Bean.

An additional full-length orchestral version was toured by English Touring Opera in 2011. The world premiere of a full-length seven-instrument chamber version was produced in September 2011 in Pittsburgh, PA and starred Daniel Teadt as Mr. Fox, Katherine Brandt as Mrs. Fox, Leah Dyer as Miss Hedgehog, Sean Donaldson, Jeffrey Gross, Sean Lenhart as Farmers Boggis, Bunce & Bean.

In 2014, the Boston Modern Orchestra Project and Odyssey Opera performed and recorded Fantastic Mr. Fox at Boston University's Jordan Hall, conducted by Gil Rose and featuring John Brancy as Mr. Fox, Krista River as Mrs. Fox, and Andrew Craig Brown, Edwin Vega, and Gabriel Preisser as Boggis, Bunce, & Bean. The recording of this performance was released in 2019 on BMOP/sound, and won the 2020 Grammy Award for Best Opera Recording.

== Roles ==
Role	Voice type	Premiere cast, December 9, 1998 (conductor: Peter Ash)	Boston cast, 2014 (conductor: Gil Rose)
Mrs. Fox	mezzo-soprano	Suzanna Guzmán	Krista River
Bennie Foxcub	treble	Jason Housman	Abigail Long
Lennie Foxcub	treble	Theo Lebow	Zoe Tekeian
Jennie Foxcub	treble	Lauren Libaw	Abi Tenenbaum
Pennie Foxcub	treble	Amy Recinos	Madeleine Kline
Farmer Boggis	bass	Louis Lebherz	Andrew Craig Brown
Farmer Bunce	tenor	Doug Jones	Edwin Vega
Farmer Bean	baritone	Jamie Offenbach	Gabriel Preisser
Fantastic Mr. Fox	baritone	Gerald Finley	John Brancy
Agnes the Digger	mezzo-soprano	Jill Grove	Andrey Nemzer
Mavis the Tractor	soprano	Lesley Leighton	Gail Novak Mosites
Miss Hedgehog	soprano	Sari Gruber	Elizabeth Futral
Badger the Miner	baritone	Malcolm MacKenzie	John Dooley
Burrowing Mole	tenor	Jorge Garza	Jonathan Blalock
Rita the Rat	mezzo-soprano	Josepha Gayer	Tynan Davis
Porcupine	tenor	Charles Castronovo	Theo Lebow

== Synopsis ==
A modern fable, Fantastic Mr. Fox is a story about good vs. evil, animal vs. human, and technology. With the help of the other creatures of the forest, Mr. Fox must outwit his enemies to keep his family safe. Mr. Fox finds that he may have stolen one hen too many from the henhouse, as the meanest farmers anywhere — Boggis, Bunce, and Bean (one fat, one short, one lean) — conspire to rid their lands of the Fox family once and for all. The Foxes are able to evade capture with the help of some woodland friends, leaving the farmers laying in wait while the animals help themselves to the fruit of the farmers' lands. Having had their revenge, the animals return for a sumptuous feast far from danger in the Foxes' new home, while the farmers continue to wait in the rain.

== Sources ==
- Battle, Laura (March 4, 2011). "Foxy business on the road". Financial Times
- Rich, Alan (11 December 1998). "Fantastic Mr. Fox", Variety
- Schott Music, Fantastic Mr. Fox
