= Thérèse Raquin (opera) =

Opera by Tobias Picker

- Opera by Tobias Picker
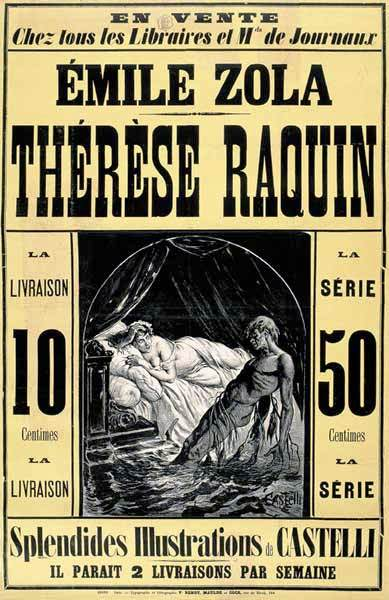
- Ad for original Thérèse Raquin
- Librettist: Gene Scheer
- Language: English
- Based on: Émile Zola's Thérèse Raquin
- Premiere: November 30, 2001; Dallas Opera

Thérèse Raquin is an American opera in two acts composed by Tobias Picker to a libretto by Gene Scheer based on the 1867 novel Thérèse Raquin by Émile Zola. It is Picker's third opera, following Emmeline (1996) and Fantastic Mr. Fox (1998). It was commissioned by the Dallas Opera, San Diego Opera, and the Opéra de Montréal. It premiered in November 2001 with light designs by Mark McCullough. In 2006, a version with reduced orchestration was commissioned by Opera Theatre Europe; it premiered that year at the Royal Opera House and had its first New York performance in 2007 at Dicapo Opera Theatre with Audrey Babcock in the title role. This version was subsequently produced by Boston University Opera Institute in 2009, Pittsburgh's Microscopic Opera Company in 2013, and both Long Beach Opera and the Chicago Opera Theater in 2015.

== Roles ==
Role	Voice	Premiere cast, 30 November 2001 (Conductor: Graeme Jenkins)
Madame Lisette Raquin	Soprano	Diana Soviero
Thérèse Raquin	Mezzo-Soprano	Sara Fulgoni
Camille Raquin	Tenor	Gordon Gietz
Laurent	Baritone	Richard Bernstein
Suzanne Michaud	Soprano	Sheryl Woods
Olivier Michaud	Bass	Gagor Andrasy
Monsieur Grivet	Tenor	Peter Kazaras

== Synopsis ==
=== Act 1 ===
Paris, 1866. Late afternoon

Madame Raquin and daughter-in-law, Thérèse, are folding laundry and discussing her son Camille's improved health and prospects. Camille rushes in with the news that their friend Laurent is coming to complete Camille's portrait. Laurent arrives with flowers for both women. Thrilled with the finished picture, Camille leaves to buy champagne. Left alone, Thérèse and Laurent, clearly familiar with each other, embrace. Thérèse describes the details of her early life and her marriage at 18 to her cousin. She explains that she consented to the marriage out of a sense of obligation to her aunt. She does not love Camille; Laurent is her hope, her grand passion. The following week, Madame Raquin and her friend Suzanne are sewing new dresses. Olivier and Monsieur Grivet, a colleague of Camille, arrive. Laurent and Camille enter, and the portrait is unveiled, applauded, and toasted. Privately, Laurent tells Thérèse that their midday trysts must end. His supervisor has threatened to fire him. She says she will do anything to be with him.

On Sunday afternoon, after a walk along the banks of the Seine, Camille naps while Laurent and Thérèse profess their love. In a moment of passion Laurent suggests killing Camille. Thérèse responds that she will do anything in order to be with him. Laurent wakes Camille, and although Camille and Thérèse cannot swim, he proposes that they all rent a boat and row out to watch the sunset. Laurent rows to the middle of the river and attacks Camille. In the struggle, Camille bites Laurent's neck, but is too weak to resist and is thrown overboard. Thérèse and Laurent, clutching each other, watch as Camille drowns.

=== Act 2 ===
The Raquin family home - eleven months later

Eleven months later, Laurent, considered a hero for "saving" Thérèse, works to secure Madame Raquin's blessing for their marriage. Suzanne, Olivier, and Grivet support it and feel that Thérèse's misery can be relieved only by a good marriage. Madame, resistant at first, eventually agrees. On her wedding morning, Thérèse wakes up screaming. Suzanne comes in to comfort her, and urges her to have faith in God. After the wedding, Madame and Suzanne prepare the bedroom for the wedding night. Olivier and Grivet arrive and announce plans to serenade the happy couple. Later that night Thérèse enters the bedroom trembling. Madame tries to comfort her with memories of Camille's childhood. Laurent arrives and tries to make love to Thérèse, but they are haunted by their crime. From the street, they hear Olivier and Grivet's serenade joined by the voice of the ghost of Camille. Frightened, they begin to argue and accuse each other.

A few weeks later, Madame is visited by Camille's ghost in her haberdashery. He relates the truth to her and, when she finally recognizes him, she screams and faints. Thérèse and Laurent rush in and find her unconscious. They speak of their regrets about having drowned Camille. Regaining consciousness, Madame overhears. Enraged, she accuses them of having murdered her son. She has a stroke and collapses. Five months later, while his friends are playing dominoes, Laurent complains about how difficult it has been caring for Madame, who is seated among them, paralyzed and mute. Madame wakens suddenly and scrawls on a piece of paper, "Thérèse and Laurent are m ...." She loses strength and stops. The guests think she meant something complimentary and leave to let her rest. Thérèse and Laurent argue violently; finally, Laurent throws his wife to the floor and exits. On the verge of insanity, Thérèse kneels before Madame, and confesses her affair with Laurent and begs for forgiveness. She begins to think that Madame is willing to pardon her. She takes a knife from the cupboard and hides it in her skirt. Laurent enters and puts poison in a glass of wine, which he offers to Thérèse ...

== Recording ==
Tobias Picker: Thérèse Raquin (Diana Soviero, Sara Fulgoni, Gordon Gietz, et al.; Dallas Opera; Conductor: Graeme Jenkins). Chandos 9659
