= Michael Capasso =

American opera impresario and stage director (born 1960)

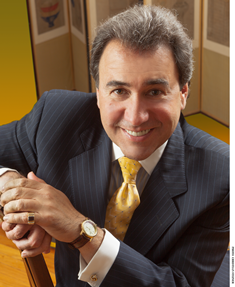
Opera Producer, Michael Capasso

Michael Capasso (born 1960) is an American opera impresario and stage director. Formerly the General Director of Dicapo Opera Theatre in New York City which he founded in 1981, he is presently the General Director of New York City Opera.

== Life and career ==
According to Capasso, he fell in love with opera as a child when he saw Mario Lanza in The Great Caruso. He studied voice at the Mannes College of Music in Manhattan and sang in amateur choruses and musicals but initially worked in the construction business, first for his uncle, and then with his own construction firm, HHM. In 1981, he founded New York's Dicapo Opera Theatre along with his high school music teacher Diane Martindale. He became the driving force behind the opera company's various projects and has directed most of its productions. He continued to work in the construction business throughout the 1980s while at the same time producing operas in different venues, including churches, schools, old vaudeville theatres, and even department stores.

In 1991 Dicapo Opera began performing regularly in St. Jean Baptiste Catholic Church on Manhattan's East Side. Capasso conceived and designed a permanent home and performance space for the company there in 1995 when he repurposed the lower level of the church, transforming the large, unused space into a 204-seat "jewel-box" theater. He was involved in most aspects of the construction project, even personally manning heavy equipment to dig the orchestra pit. Since that time, he has also directed productions for Connecticut Grand Opera (Rigoletto, 2004) and Toledo Opera (Norma, 1996; Tosca, 1999; and La bohème, 2012).

In celebration of the 75th anniversary of George Gershwin's Porgy and Bess, Capasso mounted a production which began touring in the United States in February 2010. His writing credits include an adaptation of Dickens's A Christmas Carol; Opera Senza Rancor, a satire on the world of opera; Puccini’s Passion, a biographical play with music on the life and career of Puccini; a new book and libretto for La Périchole; translation of librettos for Die Fledermaus and The Daughter of the Regiment; and a concert/lecture series for the New-York Historical Society. Capasso's film on the life and career of Enrico Caruso, which he wrote and produced, aired on the A&E network's Biography series in 1998. Other film credits include his direction of scenes from Nabucco for the feature film The Secret Lives of Dentists.

Capasso is a regular participant on the popular intermission quiz of the Metropolitan Opera live broadcasts on WQXR-FM and is a member of the Accademia Italiana della Cucina, a culinary group appointed by the Italian government to certify restaurants serving authentic Italian food.

Capasso was named General Director for NYCO Renaissance, an organization that obtained the rights to the name and assets of New York City Opera.

== Awards ==
Capasso has received New York City's Ellis Island Medal of Honor, The Licia Albanese-Puccini Foundation's Lifetime Achievement Award, and the Leonardo Da Vinci Award for Cultural Achievement from the Italian Heritage and Culture Committee of New York. In 2004, he was named "Man of the Year" by the Italian Welfare League and in 2009 received a Special Lifetime Achievement Award in the Arts from the Order Sons of Italy in America.
