= Tobias Picker =

American composer (born 1954)

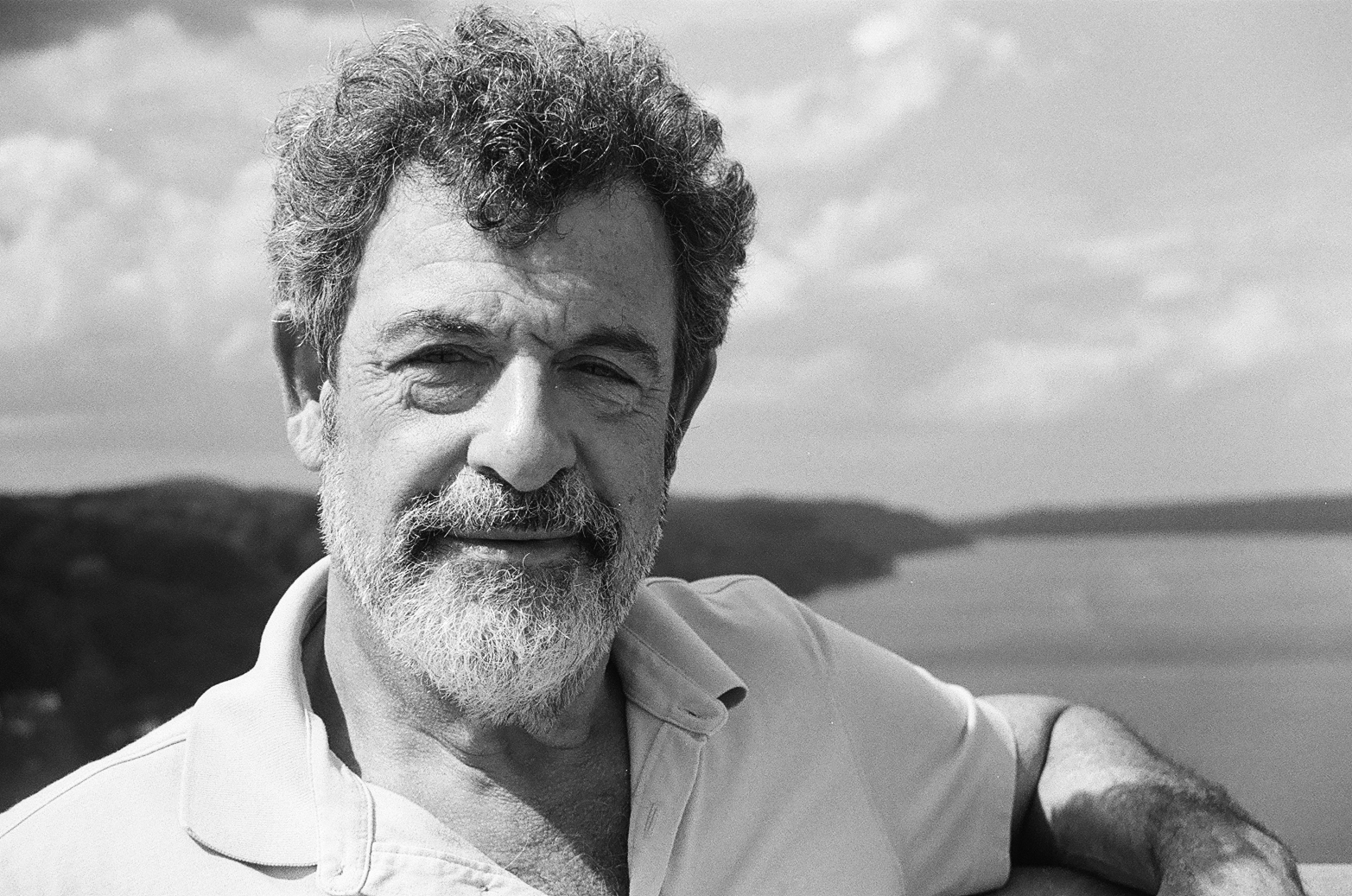
- Born: July 18, 1954 (age 72); New York City, U.S.
- Education: Juilliard School; Manhattan School of Music; Princeton University
- Occupation: Composer
- Years active: 1975–present
- Awards: Joseph H. Bearns Prize
- Website: tobiaspicker.com

Tobias Picker (born July 18, 1954) is an American composer and pianist, noted for his orchestral works Old and Lost Rivers, Keys To The City, and The Encantadas, as well as his operas Emmeline, Fantastic Mr. Fox, An American Tragedy and Lili Elbe, among many other works.

== Biography ==
=== 1954–1975: Early years, influences, and education ===
Picker was born in New York City on July 18, 1954, the son of painter and fashion designer Henriette Simon Picker and news-writer Julian Picker, and the cousin of film executive David V. Picker, businessman Harvey Picker, former CEO of the American Film Institute Jean Picker Firstenberg, art-patron Stanley Picker, filmmaker Jimmy Picker, and economist Kenneth Rogoff. At the age of eight, he began composing and studying the piano:

I was raised by my teachers on a diet of Bach, Mozart, Beethoven, Chopin, Schuman, and eventually Brahms, my favorite. There was always some "modern" music thrown in.... With the discovery of each new composer a new world opened up for me. It wasn't really until I discovered the music of Charles Wuorinen with whom I began studying at eighteen that I finally was exposed to Carter (with whom I later studied) and Boulez and Stravinsky and Stefan Wolpe.

Picker started composing in 1962, and, that same year, began corresponding with composer Gian Carlo Menotti, who encouraged his studies. Three years later, Picker was taken into the preparatory division of the Juilliard School of Music for instruction in piano and theory. At the age of eighteen, Picker was an improvising pianist for Martha Graham at the Martha Graham Center of Contemporary Dance, and, that same year, he enrolled at the Manhattan School of Music, where he studied with Charles Wuorinen. After graduating in 1976, he returned to the Juilliard School of Music to take instruction in composition from Elliott Carter and, afterwards, pursued graduate studies at Princeton University with Milton Babbitt.

=== 1976–1992: Early success ===
In 1976, at the age of twenty-two, Picker was commissioned to compose "Sextet No. 3" by Speculum Musicae, which premiered at Alice Tully Hall. Soon after, in 1978, the premiere of Rhapsody for Violin and Piano led New Yorker critic Andrew Porter to deem Picker "a genuine creator with a fertile, unforced vein of invention". By the age of thirty, Picker had been recognized with numerous awards, including fellowships from the National Endowment of the Arts, the Joseph H. Bearns Prize (Columbia University), a Charles Ives Scholarship, and a Guggenheim Fellowship.

Picker's Symphony No. 1 premiered at the San Francisco Symphony in 1983, and, that same year, Picker was the soloist in his Piano Concerto No. 2: Keys to the City, commissioned by the city of the New York for the Brooklyn Bridge Centennial. Later that year, Picker's "The Encantadas" was premiered by the Albany Symphony Orchestra. In 1985, Picker was appointed the first composer-in-residence of the Houston Symphony where he introduced his most popular orchestral work, Old and Lost Rivers, as well as two symphonies and other concerted works. In 1988, pianist Ellen Masaki premiered his Piano Concerto No. 2: Kilauea, which was commissioned and performed by the Honolulu Symphony. In 1992, Picker was awarded the Academy of Arts and Letters Award in Music.

=== Since 1993: Operas, directorship, and later career ===
In 1993, Picker began composing his first opera, Emmeline, commissioned by the Santa Fe Opera, with a libretto by J. D. McClatchy; Emmeline premiered in 1996. In 1998, two years after the debut of Emmeline, Picker's second opera, Fantastic Mr. Fox premiered at the Los Angeles Opera. Fantastic Mr. Fox was recorded by the Boston Modern Orchestra Project and Odyssey Opera in 2019 and released on Albany Records; this album won the 2020 Grammy Award for Best Opera Recording. A consortium of The Dallas Opera, San Diego Opera, and Opéra de Montréal commissioned Picker's third opera, Thérèse Raquin, which debuted in 2001. In 2005, The Metropolitan Opera debuted Picker's fourth opera, An American Tragedy, based on the novel by Theodore Dreiser; a revised version was premiered at The Glimmerglass Festival in 2014.

In 2010, Picker composed a ballet, Awakenings, for the Rambert Dance Company, inspired by the work of Oliver Sacks. That same year, he co-founded Opera San Antonio, where he served as artistic director from 2010 to 2015. In 2012, Picker was elected to a lifetime membership of the American Academy of Arts and Letters. Picker's fifth opera, Dolores Claiborne, based on the Stephen King novel of the same name, premiered at the San Francisco Opera in September 2013; soon after, in 2015, the Opera Theatre of Saint Louis mounted a new production of Emmeline, which garnered positive reviews. Picker was appointed artistic director of Tulsa Opera from 2016 to 2022. His tenure at Tulsa Opera would see the selection of Lucia Lucas as the first transgender opera singer to have a leading role on the American stage (for which she is featured in James Kicklighter's documentary film, The Sound of Identity), a baseball-themed production of Rigoletto adapted for an open-air baseball stadium to accommodate the gathering restrictions during the COVID-19 pandemic, "Greenwood Overcomes," a concert with new works by African-American composers to honor the memory of the Tulsa Race Massacre of 1921, as well as a Thaddeus Strassberger-directed production of Salome.

In 2022, Picker's opera Awakenings, based on Awakenings, Oliver Sacks's 1960's chronicle of his efforts to help the victims of an encephalitis epidemic, premiered at Opera Theatre of Saint Louis. The East Coast premiere of Awakenings was performed by Odyssey Opera in partnership with Boston Modern Orchestra Project, conducted by Gil Rose and directed by James Robinson, on February 25, 2023, at the Huntington Theater.

Picker's Lili Elbe, starring Lucia Lucas, premiered in October 2023, at Theater St. Gallen.

== Works ==
=== Instrumental music ===
Picker's symphonic music, including the tone poem Old and Lost Rivers, has been performed by major orchestras such as the New York Philharmonic, the Chicago Symphony Orchestra, the Cleveland Orchestra, the Philadelphia Orchestra, the BBC Philharmonic, The Munich Philharmonic, the Tonhalle Orchester Zurich, and the Vienna Radio Symphony Orchestra. His piano concerto Keys to the City (written for the Centenary of the Brooklyn Bridge) is recorded on Chandos with his cello concerto and the orchestral work And Suddenly It's Evening. Following this release, BBC Music Magazine proclaimed Picker's recent music "one of the glories of the current musical scene".

The Encantadas (for narrator and orchestra) features texts drawn from Herman Melville's descriptions of the Galápagos Islands. It was recorded on Virgin Classics by the Houston Symphony Orchestra with narration by Sir John Gielgud.

Other works include Tres sonetos de amor, settings of Neruda love poems in versions for baritone and orchestra, and voice and piano; and The Blue Hula, a work for chamber ensemble. Picker's complete orchestral catalogue includes three symphonies, four piano concertos and concertos for violin, viola, cello and oboe.

Picker has also composed numerous chamber works. In 2009, the American String Quartet commissioned and premiered his String Quartet No. 2 at Merkin Concert Hall in New York. In that same year, the pianist Ursula Oppens premiered Picker's Four Etudes for Ursula and Three Nocturnes for Ursula at Baisly Powell Elebash Recital Hall, also in New York. In 2011, Picker was featured in a Miller Theatre Composer Portrait Concert, featuring the Signal Ensemble, Sarah Rothenberg, and the Brentano String Quartet, who premiered his Piano Quintet "Live Oaks".

=== Operas ===
- Emmeline (1996): The Santa Fe Opera commissioned and produced the world premiere of Picker's first opera, which was subsequently broadcast nationally on the PBS Great Performances series. The premiere recording was released on CD by Albany Records.
- Fantastic Mr. Fox (1998): His second opera was an adaptation of Roald Dahl's book, commissioned and premiered by the Los Angeles Opera. Picker has written two more versions of this work: a version for chamber ensemble of seven instruments was premiered by Opera Holland Park in 2010. A version with reduced orchestration was written for the English Touring Opera, also in 2010. The Boston Modern Orchestra Project's 2019 recording won the 2020 Grammy Award for Best Opera Recording.
- Thérèse Raquin (1999/2000): Picker's third opera (libretto by Gene Scheer) was commissioned by a consortium of companies, including The Dallas Opera, San Diego Opera, and the Opéra de Montréal. Picker received a new commission from Opera Theatre Europe for a reduced-scale version of Thérèse Raquin, which was performed in March 2006 at the Linbury Studio of the Royal Opera House, Covent Garden. The premiere performance was recorded and released by Chandos in 2001.
- An American Tragedy (2005/2006): Based on the novel by Theodore Dreiser, with a libretto by Gene Scheer, Picker's fourth opera was commissioned by the Metropolitan Opera. The world premiere took place on December 2, 2005, and featured Patricia Racette, Nathan Gunn, Susan Graham, and Dolora Zajick in principal roles. The production was directed by Francesca Zambello and conducted by James Conlon.
- Dolores Claiborne (2013): The San Francisco Opera premiered Picker's fifth opera with a libretto by J. D. McClatchy, based on Stephen King's novel of the same name, in 2013.
- Awakenings (2022): Picker's sixth opera, based on Awakenings by Oliver Sacks, with a libretto by Aryeh Lev Stollman, was commissioned by The Opera Theatre of Saint Louis.
- Lili Elbe (2023), with a libretto by Aryeh Lev Stollman, starring Lucia Lucas as Lili Elbe, premiered in 2023 at Theater St. Gallen.

=== Stage works ===
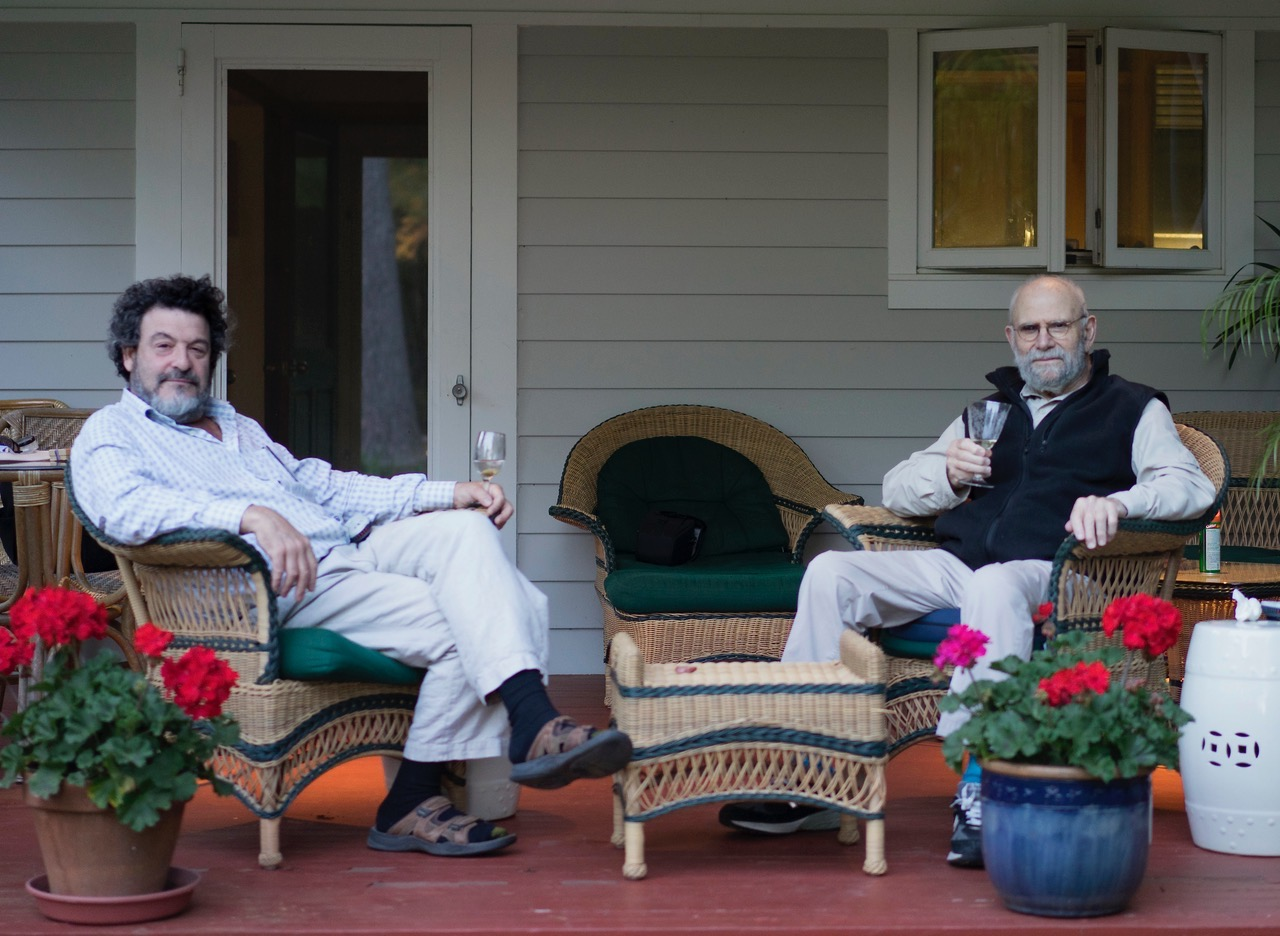
Picker and Oliver Sacks

Inspired by Awakenings by his long-time friend Oliver Sacks, Picker composed the ballet Awakenings (2010), commissioned by the Rambert Dance Company. Rambert premiered the piece in Salford, UK, in September 2010, then toured it around the UK with over 80 performances in the 2010–2011 season.

== Select discography ==
- Lili Elbe (Bright Shiny Things, 2026)
- Nova (Bright Shiny Things, 2025)
- Awakenings (BMOP Sound, 2023)
- Opera Without Words/The Encantadas (Naxos, 2020)
- Fantastic Mr. Fox (BMOP Sound, 2019)
- Invisible Lilacs (Tzadik Records, 2014)
- Keys To The City (Wergo, 2008)
- Old and Lost Rivers (Virgin Classics. 2007)
- Songs and Encores (Bridge Records, 2006)
- Symphony No. 2, String Quartet No. 1 (First Edition, 2004)
- Keys To The City, And Suddenly It's Evening, and Cello Concerto (Chandos, 2003)
- Thérèse Raquin (Chandos, 2001)
- Emmeline (Albany Records, 1998)
- The Encantadas (Virgin Records, 1998)

Additional recordings of the composer's music are available on Sony Classics, Virgin, Nonesuch Records, Ondine, Bridge and First Edition, among others.

== Collaborators ==
Directors most often associated with Picker's operas are Francesca Zambello (Emmeline, An American Tragedy, Thérèse Raquin), James Robinson (Dolores Claiborne, Emmeline, Awakenings), and Lee Blakeley, as well as librettists J. D. McClatchy (Emmeline, Dolores Claiborne) and Gene Scheer (Thérèse Raquin and An American Tragedy). He collaborated with Roald Dahl's biographer, Donald Sturrock, on Fantastic Mr. Fox, and most recently Aryeh Lev Stollman on Awakenings, as well as poets Richard Howard and W. S. Merwin. Picker's conductor collaborators have included Leon Botstein, Peter Ash, James Conlon, Sergiu Comissiona, Edo de Waart, Lukas Foss, Giancarlo Guerrero, James Levine, George Manahan, Kurt Masur, Gil Rose, John Williams, Pinchas Zukerman and Christoph Eschenbach. He has also collaborated with pianists André Watts, Jeremy Denk, Peter Serkin, Emanuel Ax, and Ursula Oppens, who has championed Picker's work since 1977, as well as violist Paul Neubauer, cellists Lynn Harrell and Paul Watkins, and flutist Carol Wincenc. The sopranos Judith Bettina and Patricia Racette have been frequent collaborators. Picker has also worked with William Burden, Gerald Finley, Elizabeth Futral, Susan Graham, Nathan Gunn, Lucia Lucas, Jennifer Larmore, Diana Soviero, and Dolora Zajick.

== Personal life ==
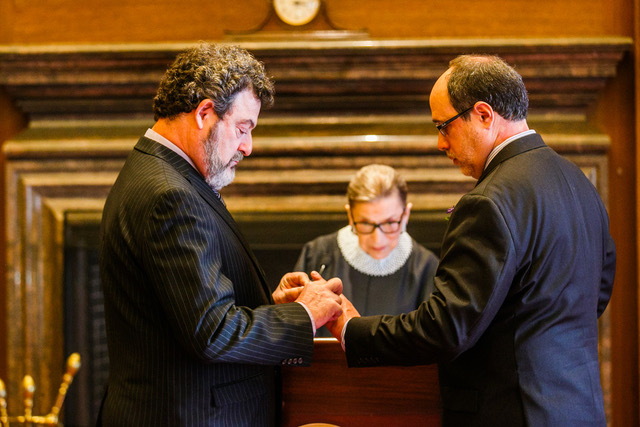
Picker, Aryeh Lev Stollman, and Ruth Bader Ginsburg

Picker's partner since 1980 has been Aryeh Lev Stollman. They were married on March 9, 2016, in a ceremony officiated by Supreme Court Justice Ruth Bader Ginsburg at the United States Supreme Court.

Picker has Tourette syndrome. He has mentioned that there are "tourettic" elements in his music. Picker appeared in a BBC Horizon television documentary, titled Mad But Glad, exploring a link between Tourette's syndrome and creativity, and has been involved in mentoring programs for children with Tourette's. Picker has tics which he says disappear when he is composing, playing the piano, or conducting. He has said, "I live my life controlled by Tourette's...but I use music to control it. I have harnessed its energy—I play with it, manipulate it, trick it, mimic it, taunt it, explore it, exploit it, in every possible way." Sacks wrote of the inspiration he took from Picker's music in the preface to his book, The Island of the Colorblind, saying he "owe[d] a special debt to Tobias Picker's version of The Encantadas", and that "whenever, in the writing, memory failed me, listening to the piece operated as a sort of Proustian mnemonic, transporting me back to the Marianas and the Carolines".
