= Nathan Gunn =

American opera singer (born 1970)

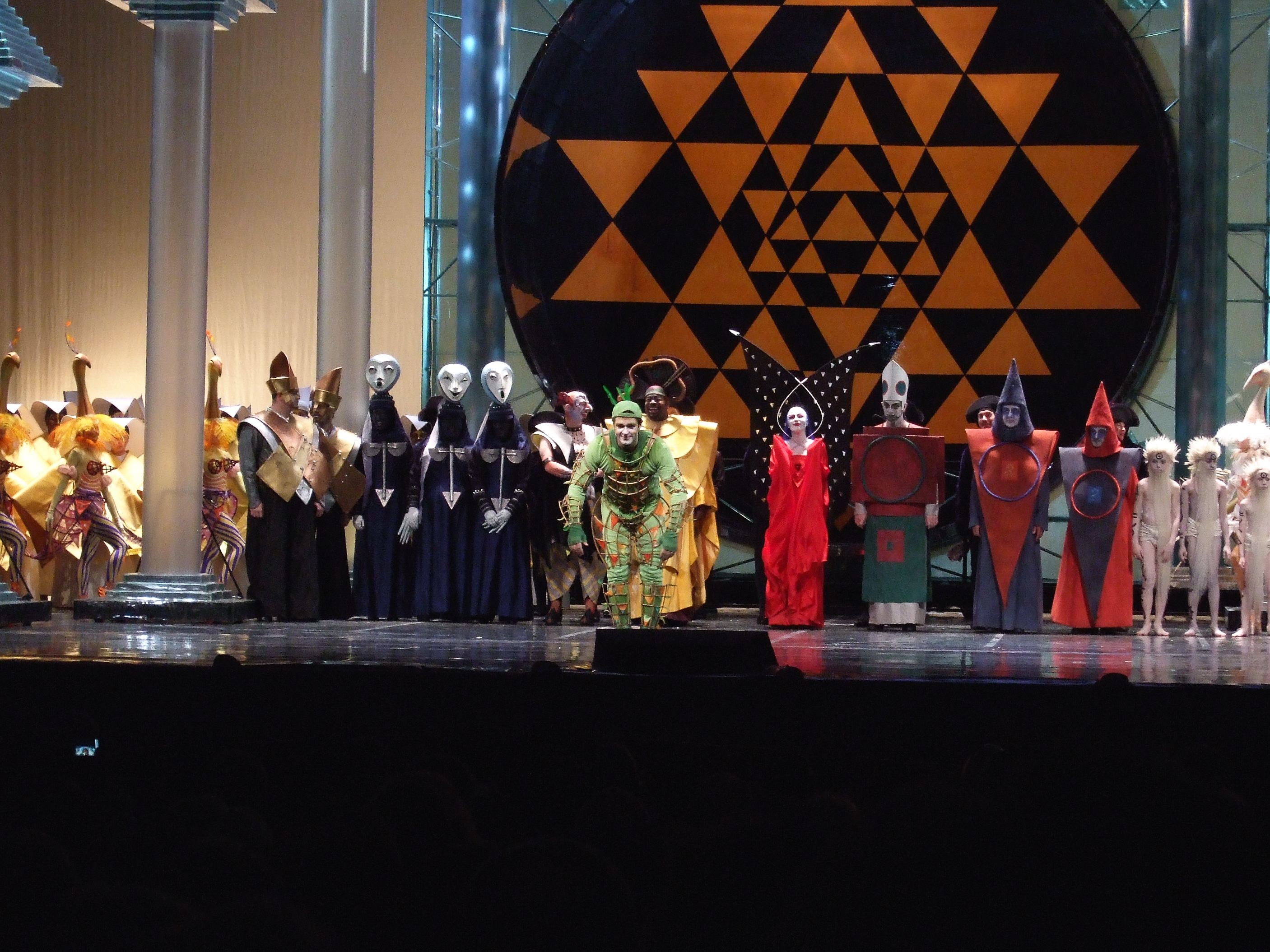
Nathan Gunn (center) as Papageno in Mozart's "The Magic Flute".

Nathan T. Gunn (born November 26, 1970, in South Bend, Indiana) is an American operatic baritone who performs regularly around the world. He is an alumnus of the University of Illinois Urbana-Champaign where he is currently a professor of voice.

He has appeared in many of the world's well-known opera houses, including the Metropolitan Opera in New York City, the San Francisco Opera, Lyric Opera of Chicago, Houston Grand Opera, Seattle Opera, the Dallas Opera, the Opera Company of Philadelphia, the Pittsburgh Opera, The Santa Fe Opera, The Royal Opera in London, the Paris Opéra, the Bavarian State Opera in Munich, Theater an der Wien in Vienna, Opera Theatre of Saint Louis, Teatro Real in Madrid, and the Théâtre Royal de la Monnaie in Brussels. He has also appeared at the Glyndebourne Festival near London, the Ravinia Festival near Chicago, and the Mostly Mozart Festival in New York City. In 2011, Gunn was featured as a guest star in the Mormon Tabernacle Choir's annual Christmas concert before an audience of 80,000 in Salt Lake City. The concert was broadcast on PBS and was released as an album in 2012 entitled Once Upon a Christmas.

In August 2015, Gunn starred in the world premiere of Jennifer Higdon's Cold Mountain, based on the award-winning 1997 novel by Charles Frazier, presented by The Santa Fe Opera. Gunn's previous Santa Fe performances include a 1998 production of Berlioz’ Béatrice et Bénédict as well as a 1999 production of Richard Strauss’ Ariadne auf Naxos.

While he is noted for his vocal prowess and acting, Gunn has received almost as much fame for his physique, a peculiar feat for an opera singer. He has been dubbed a "barihunk" although as a play on baritone and hunk, he has said he prefers the term "hunkitone." In 2008, he was featured in People magazine's list of "The Sexiest Men Alive."

Gunn was appointed a tenured professor of voice in 2007 at the University of Illinois School of Music, and in 2013 he was named general director of the Lyric Theater @ Illinois. In 2012 the Opera Company of Philadelphia appointed him director of its American Repertoire Council promoting new American works. His wife, Julie Jordan Gunn, who holds a doctorate (A. Mus. D.) in vocal coaching and accompanying from University of Illinois, was also appointed associate professor in collaborative piano at the university.

== Roles ==
- Title role in Hamlet
- Title role in Billy Budd
- Anthony in Sweeney Todd: The Demon Barber of Fleet Street (2002)
- Title role in Eugene Onegin
- Title role in Kullervo
- Guglielmo in Così fan tutte
- Figaro in Il barbiere di Siviglia
- The Count in Le nozze di Figaro
- Marcello in La bohème
- Malatesta in Don Pasquale
- Belcore in L'elisir d'amore
- Ottone in L'incoronazione di Poppea
- Tarquinius in The Rape of Lucretia
- Oreste in Iphigénie en Tauride
- Bénédict in Béatrice et Bénédict
- Harlekin in Ariadne auf Naxos
- Papageno in Die Zauberflöte
- Zurga in Les pêcheurs de perles
- Prince Andrei in War and Peace
- Danilo Danilovitsch in The Merry Widow
- Valentin in Faust
- Gaylord Ravenal in Show Boat (2008)
- Gaylord Ravenal in Show Boat (2012)
- Lancelot in Camelot (2013)
- Billy Bigelow in Carousel (2013)
- Title role in Sweeney Todd: The Demon Barber of Fleet Street (2015)
- Ríolobo in Florencia en el Amazonas
- Clyde Griffiths in An American Tragedy
- Buzz Aldrin in Man on the Moon
- Father Delaura in Love and Other Demons
- The Lodger in The Aspern Papers
- James Dalton in A Harlot's Progress
- Paul in Amelia (2010)
- Alec Harvey in Brief Encounter
- Ned Keene in Peter Grimes
- Yeshua in The Gospel of Mary Magdalene
- W. P. Inman in Cold Mountain (2015)
- Sid Taylor in Great Scott (2015)
- Emile de Becque in South Pacific (2019)
- Max von Mayerling in Sunset Boulevard (2023)
