= Patricia Racette =

American operatic soprano (born 1965)

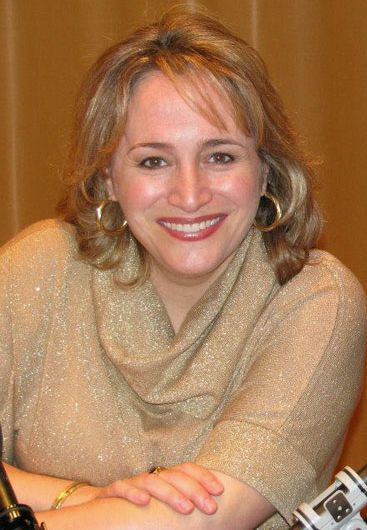
Patricia Racette, 2012

Patricia Lynn Racette (born in 1965) is an American operatic soprano. A winner of the Richard Tucker Award in 1998, she has been a regular presence at major opera houses internationally. Racette has enjoyed long-term partnerships with the San Francisco Opera, where she has been a regular performer since 1989, and with the Metropolitan Opera, where she has performed since 1995. Also active on the concert stage, Racette has appeared with many of the world's leading orchestras, including the Boston Symphony Orchestra, the Chicago Symphony Orchestra, the San Francisco Symphony, and the London Philharmonic Orchestra. She also received the award for Best Opera Recording for her performance in the Los Angeles Opera's production of The Ghosts of Versailles at the 59th Annual Grammy Awards.

Racette has particularly excelled in Puccini and Verdi operas. Among her most well-known roles is Violetta in La traviata; Blanche de la Force and Madame Lidoine in Dialogues of the Carmelites; both Mimì and Musetta in La bohème; the title heroine in Jenůfa; Cio-Cio San in Madama Butterfly; the title role in Tosca; Alice Ford in Falstaff; Liù in Turandot; Desdemona in Otello; and Káťa in Káťa Kabanová. She has performed in several world premieres, including the title role in Tobias Picker's Emmeline (1996), and as Leslie Crosby in Paul Moravec's The Letter (2009) at the Santa Fe Opera. She appeared in the premiere of Picker's An American Tragedy (2005) at the Met, and portrayed Love Simpson in the premiere of Carlisle Floyd's Cold Sassy Tree (2000) at the Houston Grand Opera.

== Early life and education ==
Racette was born in Manchester, New Hampshire, in 1965, the middle child of three siblings. Her father was a union representative and distributor of Pepsi products in southern New Hampshire. Her mother, now deceased, was a part-time bank employee and homemaker. At the age of seven she relocated with her family to Bedford, New Hampshire, where she spent the rest of her youth. Both her parents were originally from Bedford. She began playing guitar at age 8. Self-taught, she began singing along with the guitar, which became the source of her interest in vocal music. She attended Manchester High School West, where she was very active in the school music program. Under the direction of Richard Maynard, she participated in regional chorale competitive festivals.

Upon graduation from high school in 1983, Racette matriculated at the University of North Texas with the intent of studying vocal jazz. She was told her voice was more amenable to opera performance than jazz, which initially upset her. However, she eventually found that she really enjoyed opera and enthusiastically pursued a vocal studies major, studying with Pattye Johnstone. In her senior year, she won first prize in the auditions for the Merola Opera Program, which is the training arm of the San Francisco Opera. Her first opera performance was at a community college in Fort Worth, Texas, in the title role in Carlisle Floyd's Susannah. After graduating from college, Racette made her professional opera debut in 1988 in Giacomo Puccini's Madama Butterfly with the San Francisco Western Opera Theater and traveled with the company for performances in New York City. Critic Bernard Holland said of her performance, "Patricia Racette was an especially compelling actress as Cio-Cio San, and it was acting achieved through music – just as opera performance should be. Yet Miss Racette has a soprano voice that, while musically and technically reliable, is never terribly luxurious in sound."

She made her debut with the San Francisco Opera in 1989 as the voice of the priestess in Aida. She sang several more roles with the company while in the Merola program, including Alice Ford in Falstaff, Rosalinda in Die Fledermaus, Sister Osmina in Suor Angelica, and Freia and Helmwige in The Ring Cycle. In 1991 she was made an Adler Fellow at the San Francisco Opera, which led to several more performances at the SFO over the next two years, including Micaëla in Carmen, Dunyasha in War and Peace, the First Lady in The Magic Flute, and Mimì in La bohème.

== Career ==
In 1992 Racette joined the roster of singers at the New York City Opera, making her debut with the company as Musetta in La bohème. She sang one more role with the company in the spring of 1993, Micaëla in Carmen. In March 1993 she made her Vancouver Opera debut as Blanche de la Force in Poulenc's Carmelites, and later that year she made her debut with the Opera Theatre of Saint Louis as Donna Elvira in Don Giovanni. She also continued her relationship with the San Francisco Opera, portraying Margherita in Mefistofele in 1994, and made her first European appearances that year at the Vienna State Opera and the Welsh National Opera. Although she received good reviews for these performances, it was not until she won the Marian Anderson Award in 1994, an award which also helped further the careers of Sylvia McNair (1990), Denyce Graves (1991), and Nathan Gunn (1996), that she drew wider attention in the opera world.

In 1994 Racette was offered a contract by the Metropolitan Opera to perform the role of Musetta in La bohème for performance in the spring of 1995. She made her debut at the house on March 4, 1995, with Mary Mills as Mimì, Luis Lima as Rodolfo, Roberto Frontali as Marcello, and John Fiore conducting. Her performance was so well received she was immediately engaged to sing the role of Mimì in subsequent seasons, and has remained an annual performer at the Met since her debut. Her popularity at the house grew rapidly, and she began to add more roles to her Met repertoire in the late 1990s, including Ellen Orford in Peter Grimes, Antonia/Stella in Les contes d'Hoffmann, and Violetta in La traviata. She took over the latter part in 1998 after the firing of Angela Gheorghiu and the cancellation of Renée Fleming. In the 2000s she has added the roles Alice Ford in Falstaff, Blanche de la Force in Dialogues of the Carmelites, Elizabeth of Valois in Don Carlos, and Nedda in Pagliacci to her Met repertoire. In 2005 she notably portrayed Roberta Alden in the world premiere of Tobias Picker's An American Tragedy. She most recently sang the role of Cio-Cio San at the house in 2012.

In 1996 Racette had a major critical success portraying the title role in the world premiere of Tobias Picker's Emmeline for her debut at the Santa Fe Opera. She has since returned to that house frequently, portraying Violetta (1997), Blanche de la Force (1999), Tatyana in Eugene Onegin (2002), the title role in Káťa Kabanová (2003), Amelia Grimaldi in Simon Boccanegra (2004), and Liù in Turandot (2005). She most recently returned to the house to portray the role of Leslie Crosby in the premiere of Paul Moravec's The Letter in 2009.

In 1998 Racette was the recipient of the coveted Richard Tucker Award, which is given annually by the Richard Tucker Music Foundation to an American-born opera singer on the threshold of a major national and international career. Some prior recipients of this award have been Renée Fleming (1990), Deborah Voigt (1992), Ruth Ann Swenson (1993), Dwayne Croft (1996), and David Daniels (1997). Racette continued to maintain an active relationship with the San Francisco Opera during the late 1990s up to the present day. Among the many appearances she has made with the company are Mathilde in William Tell (1997), the title role in Luisa Miller (2000), the title role in Leoš Janáček's Jenůfa (2001), Violetta (2001), Desdemona in Otello (2002), Liù (2002), and several performance of Cio-Cio San from 2005 through 2008 among other roles.

In 2000 Racette made her debut at La Scala as Ellen Orford and her debut at the Lyric Opera of Chicago as Jenůfa. She has since returned to Chicago numerous time to portray such roles as Mimì, Marguerite in Charles Gounod's Faust, Micaëla, Liù, and Madame Lidoine. In 2005 she made her first appearance at the Los Angeles Opera as Cio-Cio San. In 2016, Racette made her role debut in Poulenc's La voix humaine for her first appearance at the Chicago Opera Theater.

Patricia Racette was appointed Artistic Director of the Opera Theatre of Saint Louis on May 6, 2025, with her tenure commencing on October 1, 2025.

Other notable opera companies with which Racette has appeared include the Washington National Opera, the San Diego Opera, the Dallas Opera, the Opéra National de Paris, the Teatro Comunale di Bologna, the Teatro Comunale, Florence, the Grand Théâtre de Genève, the Bavarian State Opera, the Royal Opera, London, and Opera Australia. She has also performed in operas at the Saito Kinen Festival and the Tanglewood Music Festival.

== Recordings ==
- Verdi's I lombardi 1997 CD with James Levine and the Metropolitan Opera Orchestra
- Tobias Picker's Emmeline 1998 CD with George Manahan and the Santa Fe Opera Orchestra
- Carlisle Floyd's Cold Sassy Tree 2005 CD with Patrick Summers and the Houston Grand Opera Orchestra
- Britten's Peter Grimes 2008 DVD with Donald Runnicles and the Metropolitan Opera Orchestra
- Zemlinsky's Der Traumgörge 2010 CD with James Conlon and the Cologne Gürzenich Orchestra
- Puccini's Madama Butterfly 2011 DVD with Patrick Summers and the Metropolitan Opera Orchestra
- Diva on Detour 2013 CD live recording with accompanist Craig Terry of an intimate evening of songs from Stephen Sondheim, Cole Porter, George Gershwin, and Édith Piaf
- Corigliano's - The Ghosts of Versailles 2016 CD with James Conlon and the Los Angeles Opera. PENTATONE PTC 5186538

== Personal life ==
Racette has been pictured on the cover of Opera News in June 2002, December 2005 and October 2009. She was also on the cover of the February 2006 edition of the Lesbian News and was featured in the September 2002 edition of The Advocate. She has been known to silence critics with her pointed responses. Although a perfectionist known for exacting standards, she dislikes analysis of opera in strictly technical terms, insisting on asking "But how does it make you feel?" She and her wife, fellow opera singer Beth Clayton, whom she met in 1997, travel about 10 months of the year. For the other two months, they live in a home which they built in the middle of the desert on the outskirts of Santa Fe, New Mexico.

In June 2002, she was featured as the cover story for the Opera News magazine and requested that the magazine include her public coming-out statement. She stated that her sexuality and her long-term relationship with Clayton were a very important part of who she is as an artist.

Racette and Clayton were married in the summer of 2005. The subject of Racette's homosexuality has been covered in numerous other magazine interviews and articles since.
