= Brilliant Minds =

American medical drama television series (2024–2026)

- Genre: Medical drama
- Created by: Michael Grassi
- Based on: The Man Who Mistook His Wife for a Hat and An Anthropologist on Mars by Oliver Sacks
- Starring: Zachary Quinto; Tamberla Perry; Ashleigh LaThrop; Alexander MacNicoll; Aury Krebs; Spence Moore II; Teddy Sears; Brian Altemus; John Clarence Stewart; Al Calderon
- Composer: Joseph Trapanese
- Country of origin: United States
- Original language: English
- No. of seasons: 2
- No. of episodes: 33

Production
- Executive producers: Michael Grassi; Andy Serkis; DeMane Davis; Greg Berlanti; Henrik Bastin; Jonathan Cavendish; Lee Toland Krieger; Leigh London Redman; Melissa Aouate; Sarah Schechter; Will Tennant
- Producers: Zachary Quinto; Carl Ogawa; Mohan Mandali; Michael Wray
- Cinematography: Pierre Gill
- Editors: Nicholas Wong; Gaston Jaren Lopez; Finnian Murray
- Running time: 43 minutes
- Production companies: Berlanti Productions; 1107 Productions; 72nd Street; Fabel Entertainment; The Imaginarium; Universal Television; Warner Bros. Television

Original release
- Network: NBC
- Release: September 23, 2024 – July 1, 2026

Brilliant Minds is an American medical drama television series created and written by Michael Grassi that is inspired by the Oliver Sacks books The Man Who Mistook His Wife for a Hat and An Anthropologist on Mars. The series aired on NBC from September 23, 2024 until July 1, 2026.

In May 2025, the series was renewed for a second season, which premiered on September 22, 2025. After a mid-season break, the second season resumed on January 5, 2026. On February 4, 2026, NBC pulled the show from its schedule and later canceled the series on May 1, 2026, after two seasons. The final six episodes aired from May 27 until July 1, 2026.

== Premise ==
Primarily set in New York City, Dr. Oliver Wolf reluctantly takes a job leading a team of interns to treat very complex neurological and psychological patients at Bronx General Hospital. Although Wolf may be a brilliant and caring physician, he suffers from prosopagnosia, and sometimes may apply unconventional and unpredictable methods in order to fully connect with the patients he encounters on a daily basis. Despite this critical setback, Wolf remains committed to ensuring his patients get the appropriate and effective care they need while finding meaning in their unique conditions they're suffering from.

== Cast and characters ==
=== Main ===
- Zachary Quinto as Oliver Wolf (named after Oliver Wolf Sacks), an attending physician in neurology at Bronx General Hospital. Wolf has prosopagnosia and manages his condition while working with patients.
  - Ted Sutherland as teenaged Oliver Wolf
  - Jaden Waldman as young Oliver Wolf
- Tamberla Perry as Carol Pierce, the chair of psychiatry who is Wolf's best friend
- Ashleigh LaThrop as Ericka Kinney, a first-year resident in neurology
- Alex MacNicoll as Van Markus (season 1, recurring season 2), a first-year resident in neurology
- Aury Krebs as Dana Dang, a first-year resident in neurology
- Spence Moore II as Jacob Nash (season 1, recurring season 2), a first-year resident in neurology
- Teddy Sears as Josh Nichols, the chair of neurosurgery who becomes Wolf's boyfriend
- Brian Altemus as Charlie Porter (season 2), a new second-year resident in neurology
- John Clarence Stewart as Anthony Thorne (season 2), an attending physician in the emergency department
- Al Calderon as Nurse Nico Silva (season 2)

=== Recurring ===
- Donna Murphy as Muriel Landon, Wolf's mother, the chief medical officer at Bronx General Hospital.
- Alex Ozerov-Meyer as John Doe
- Mishel Prada as Katie Rodriguez
- Rainbow Sun Francks as Morris Allen
- Julia Chan as Alison Whitaker
- Dorrett White as Nurse Carter
- Mandy Patinkin as Noah Wolf, a family medicine physician who develops a mentor relationship with his son Oliver.
  - Gray Powell plays a younger Noah in flashbacks.
- Stacey Farber as Michelle, care worker and Van Markus's former wife
- Bellamy Young as Amelia Frederick (season 2), a clinical director of Hudson Oaks Behavioral Health Services Facility
- Sarah Steele as Sofia (season 2)
- Marco Pigossi as Dr. Beau Pedrosa (season 2)

=== Guest ===
- André De Shields as Harold
- Steve Howey as Wyatt James
- Alexander Pennecke as Ezra Smith
- Sammi Hanratty as Bridget
- Brendan Hines as Simon
- Susan Bay Nimoy as June Sullivan
- Laura Vandervoort as Cynthia Grudko (season 2)
- Porsha Williams as Bitsy (season 2)
- Molly Bernard as Lauren Brooks (season 2)
- Connor Tomlinson as Tom (season 2)
- Jane Krakowski as Arianna Burnett (season 2), a wealthy donor of the hospital claiming her family is using a conservatorship to abuse her
- Eric Dane as Matthew Ramati (season 2), a firefighter battling ALS
- Casimere Jollette as Juliette (season 2), a ballerina who suffers a medical issue while rehearsing for The Nutcracker
- Brennan Clost as Mikhal (season 2), a ballet dancer who is rehearsing a pas de deux with Juliette for The Nutcracker

== Episodes ==
=== Series overview ===
Season	Episodes	Originally released	
Season	Episodes	First released	Last released
1	13	September 23, 2024	January 6, 2025
2	20	September 22, 2025	July 1, 2026

=== Season 1 (2024–25) ===
No. overall	No. in season	Title	Directed by	Written by	Original release date	Prod. code	U.S. viewers (millions)
1	1	"Pilot"	Lee Toland Krieger	Michael Grassi & Alex Berger	September 23, 2024	T15.10168	3.92
Neurologist Oliver Wolf is fired from his current job due to his empathetic but unconventional methods of patient care. We begin to learn where his methods of care originated: in his childhood with his mentally ill father. Oliver reluctantly accepts a job at Bronx General Hospital, where his best friend Carol works as a psychiatrist. Oliver must adjust to managing four interns as he takes on a case of a mother who no longer recognizes her children after surgery to treat her epilepsy. While treating his new patient, Oliver butts heads with the neurosurgeon, Josh Nichols, who performed the surgery. But the biggest conflict may be with the Chief Medical Officer, who turns out to be Oliver's mother, Muriel Landon.
2	2	"The Disembodied Woman"	Lee Toland Krieger	Michael Grassi	September 30, 2024	T13.25102	3.46
Oliver runs into a young man having visions and brings him to Bronx General for evaluation. Intern Ericka Kinney initially dismisses the case of the "frat boy from Fordham," but it turns out that he's much more than a case of too much alcohol and LSD. At the same time, a former WNBA basketball player, Jessie Williams, shows up for a routine surgery, but she begins displaying strange symptoms with no known cause. Oliver and his team must think outside the box to figure out how to keep Jessie out of long-term care. Meanwhile, a paralyzed John Doe shows up at the hospital, Oliver gets to know his interns better, and his initially tense relationship with the neurosurgeon, Josh, begins to thaw.
3	3	"The Lost Biker"	DeMane Davis	Sara Saedi & Ryan Knighton	October 7, 2024	T13.25103	3.30
Oliver's motorcycle mechanic, Wyatt, shows up at Oliver's house for medical care because he accidentally shot himself. Oliver thinks there's more to the accident, and he tells Wyatt to come in for evaluation. Oliver clashes with Josh over Wyatt's care. The interns puzzle over a young girl whose seizures aren't responding to medication. Oliver insists that the interns need to see one of the seizures instead of handing out drugs without knowing exactly what's going on. One of the interns, Van Markus, comes up with a solution, while at the same time displaying strange symptoms of his own, which Oliver diagnoses as mirror-touch synesthesia. More is revealed about Oliver's past, his childhood, his conflicts with his mother, and his mentally ill father.
4	4	"The Blackout Bride"	Deborah Kampmeier	Davia Carter & Daniela Lamas	October 14, 2024	T13.25104	3.09
An incoherent and blood-covered young woman, Bridget, shows up at the hospital. She is on what seems to be MDMA, and her husband, Charlie, is missing. In order to get answers, Oliver says he needs to get inside her mind. To do that, he takes some of the drugs his interns find in Bridget's purse. One of the interns, Dana Dang, accompanies a high Oliver as he goes in search of Charlie, whom they find minutes from death. Two of the other interns, Jacob and Ericka, tend to the paralyzed John Doe, who is supposed to be moved to long-term care in the morning. Oliver has tasked the two interns with finding a reason for John Doe to stay with them. Bridget's symptoms turn out to be far more than a response to MDMA as Josh and Oliver discover while looking at her brain scans. Bridget's case brings back memories of Oliver's teen years with his father, who was fired from the hospital. Jacob and Ericka's work pays off: they discover John Doe is responsive—not comatose but conscious, even if unable to move or talk.
5	5	"The Haunted Marine"	Charles Randolph-Wright	Aisha Bhoori & Will Ewing	October 21, 2024	T13.25105	3.12
A former Marine, Steve Hill, comes to see Carol with a long list of symptoms, including hallucinations. Carol consults with Oliver and his interns to try to get to the bottom of what Steve is experiencing. Josh, who was in the military, has some insight into the case, and he and Oliver begin to bond while coming up with the diagnosis: CTE. Van and Dana work with John Doe, who has locked-in syndrome, to try to communicate with him, but they aren't having much luck until a patient walks by speaking Russian, which turns out to be John Doe's language. They make a Russian letterboard so they can communicate with John Doe. Oliver suggests to Josh that they should try to implant a chip in John Doe's brain so he can communicate through a computer. Both cases bring back more of Oliver's memories of his childhood and his father.
6	6	"The Girl Who Cried Pregnant"	Jordan Canning	Stasia Demick & William Yu	October 28, 2024	T13.25106	2.63
A high school girl, Sarah Kim, comes to Bronx General for an ultrasound. She appears pregnant, but there is no baby. Hers is a case of pseudocyesis: false pregnancy. It turns out that everyone in her group of friends also thinks they're pregnant. Oliver and his interns go to the girls' high school to figure out the cause of what they think is mass psychogenic illness. Meanwhile, Carol tries to get John Doe into a clinical trial for a Brain–Computer Interface implant. Carol is having her own issues as her marriage falls apart. She comes to stay with Oliver, with whom she has a 20-year friendship. The case of the high school girls makes Oliver think about his past and the disappearance/death of his father, but it also makes him think about the future as the high school principal, Mark Owens, asks Oliver out on a date—and Oliver turns him down.
7	7	"The Man From Grozny"	David Katzenberg	Michael Grassi & Shannon Looney	November 11, 2024	T13.25107	2.63
Through a letterboard, the staff at Bronx General learn that their locked-in patient is named Roman. Roman consents to surgery to implant a microchip for a brain–computer interface. Once he's able to speak, however, he expresses the wish to die because he doesn't want to live in his condition. Oliver decides they must find a reason for Roman to want to live. A search turns up the reason Roman left Chechnya: to be with his partner, Alex. It is illegal to be gay in Chechnya. But Roman doesn't want Alex to have to care for him in his state: he still wants to die. It's a moment of crisis for Oliver, Josh, Carol, and the interns, but they must consent to Roman's wish to be removed from life support. The team come together to provide what Roman wants. Despite the sadness and loss, it's also a moment of renewal as Oliver decides to act on his attraction to Josh.
8	8	"The Lovesick Widow"	James DeWille	Sara Saedi	November 18, 2024	T13.25108	2.98
An elderly woman's sons bring her to Bronx General because she's been exhibiting erratic behavior, hooking up with numerous other residents at her elder care facility. Oliver and his interns figure out that June has neurosyphilis, which causes hypersexuality. She contracted it from her husband, who cheated on her repeatedly during her marriage. The case resonates with Oliver, who is watching Carol's marriage fall apart. It also triggers memories of his own first love as he navigates his new relationship with Josh. June's case also resonates with Ericka, who put her own love life on hold as she worked her way through medical school. June's advice inspires Ericka to seize the day.
9	9	"The Colorblind Painter"	Dawn Wilkinson	Davia Carter & Ryan Knighton	November 25, 2024	T13.25109	2.75
Oliver treats an artist, Gabriel Ferguson, who is having trouble painting. It turns out that, since a car accident, Gabriel has cerebral achromatopsia: an inability to see color. During the accident, Gabriel not only lost color vision from carbon monoxide poisoning, but he also lost his wife, who was the source of metaphorical color in his world. Oliver works with Gabriel to adjust to his condition and learn to paint again. In the personal lives of the doctors, Carol discovers that one of her patients, Alison, was her husband's mistress, Ericka and Van experience tensions related to keeping their relationship a secret, but Van is keeping another secret, which he confesses to Jacob: he has a son, who lives with his mom. Oliver tries to stay in touch with Josh, who is away at a conference, but his lack of a cell phone hinders communication…until Josh buys him a phone.
10	10	"The First Responder"	Maggie Kiley	Stasia Demick & William Yu	December 2, 2024	T13.25110	2.82
An EMT, Katie, brings an injured young boy, Finn, into Bronx General. The interns figure out that he has CIPA, congenital insensitivity to pain, which is why he doesn't know when he's hurting himself. The EMT, Katie, becomes a patient herself when she collapses outside the hospital. What caused her collapse and subsequent infection is a mystery until the interns discover she's been taking steroids for a work-related injury. Her immune system was compromised by the steroids, and her body was unable to fight a listeria infection. The doctors come up with a treatment plan for Finn, who needs to learn how to protect himself from injury, and for Katie, whose body needs to heal. While helping Katie through her illness, Dana develops feelings for her. Oliver and Josh begin to feel out their relationship and how to handle it. Carol deals with further revelations about her marriage and struggles with the ethical dilemma of treating her husband's mistress.
11	11	"The Other Woman"	Sudz Sutherland	Daniela Lamas & Will Ewing	December 9, 2024	T13.25111	2.52
Oliver treats a Tourette's patient, Ezra, who wants to get brain surgery to reduce his tics. Josh and Oliver disagree about whether Ezra should get the surgery. Oliver thinks Ezra's tics are part of who he is; Josh thinks that if you have the ability to make a change, there's nothing wrong with doing it. Their disagreement becomes personal. Meanwhile, Jacob and Van get competitive about their caseload—and Ericka—until Jacob reveals Van's secret, and Ericka tells Van they should go back to just being friends. Carol's patient, Alison, recovers from a suicide attempt, and Carol must put her feelings aside in order to be there for her. Carol decides to tell her husband about Alison, and, finally, to ask her husband for a divorce. While Carol's marriage is falling apart, Josh and Oliver make peace.
12	12	"The Doctor Whose World Collapsed"	Harry Jierjian	Sara Saedi & Davia Carter	January 6, 2025	T13.25112	2.82
The staff at Bronx General receive news that an apartment building has collapsed, and they'll be receiving many patients who are injured and need care. It turns out that the building is Ericka's apartment building, and she's trapped in the elevator with two other people. Josh and Oliver go to the building to perform an emergency surgery on a woman trapped in the rubble. Emergency crews finally get to the elevator to rescue Ericka, but, in the process, the elevator falls, killing the last person inside it. Back at the hospital, Oliver makes peace with his mother, and Dana comforts Ericka, who is wracked with guilt because she was saved while someone else died. Josh and Oliver deepen their relationship throughout the day and seem to have a strong bond as Josh arrives at Oliver's house for the night. Oliver's mother receives a less welcome guest at her house: Oliver's father, Noah.
13	13	"The Man Who Can't See Faces"	DeMane Davis	Michael Grassi	January 6, 2025	T13.25113	2.54
The morning after the building collapse, Oliver and Josh have breakfast. Josh asks Oliver to accompany him to a gala at which he's being honored. Oliver accepts, and Josh says he's falling for Oliver. Oliver doesn't answer, but goes to the church that is helping the people who have been displaced by the building collapse. At the church, he meets Pastor Thomas, who is having visions, and Oliver asks her to come to the hospital for an evaluation. When Oliver returns home, a stranger knocks on his door, claiming to be his dad. Oliver has thought, his whole life, that his father was dead. Back at the hospital, Oliver must deliver a terrible diagnosis to Pastor Thomas: she has a glioblastoma, a terminal condition, even with treatment. Carol gets put on administrative leave because she was reported for continuing to treat Alison despite her conflict of interest. In shock from his father’s appearance, Oliver fights with Josh, and decides to meet with his father instead of attending Josh's gala.

=== Season 2 (2025–26) ===
No. overall	No. in season	Title	Directed by	Written by	Original release date	Prod. code	U.S. viewers (millions)
14	1	"Phantom Hook"	Harry Jierjian	Michael Grassi & Sara Saedi	September 22, 2025	T13.26201	2.23
In a flash-forward, Oliver is seemingly in a care facility, Hudson Oaks, attempting to escape. A title card reads: 6 months earlier, the main time of this episode. Carol is in private practice while on administrative leave. Dana has begun dating the EMT, Katie. Jacob is doing his Emergency Department rotation. Oliver treats an MMA fighter, Tommy, who can't control one of his arms. He has alien hand syndrome as a result of early onset Parkinson's. Oliver uses his outside-the-box thinking to train Tommy to control his arm again. Ericka has just returned from Mexico, where she went to recover from the trauma of her building's collapse and the death of the woman in the elevator, but she has developed a benzo habit. A new resident, Charlie, has come to join the department. He immediately clashes with Oliver. Josh and Oliver have seemingly broken up. Oliver's father is living at Oliver's house, but Oliver is avoiding him, sleeping at the hospital. Carol decides to ask for her job back. After talking to Carol, Oliver decides to go home and try to talk to his dad. When he arrives, he finds the house empty. His dad is gone again, and has left only a letter for Oliver.
15	2	"The Contestant"	DeMane Davis	Ariana Jackson & Davia Carter	September 29, 2025	T13.26202	2.32
A patient, Lauren, shows up at the Bronx General Emergency Department, claiming she was injured on a reality show that is something like Love Is Blind. Charlie calls her "crazy," and Ericka calls him out on his use of the word. Oliver approaches Lauren in her isolation room and gets her to agree to take meds. Oliver's talk with Lauren spurs him to try to get back together with Josh, but Josh refuses, indicating that Oliver's "house isn't in order." Oliver gets called to the hospital, where Lauren is in medical crisis because she's been getting IVF treatments. Ericka sleeps through her on-call alarm, and Charlie tells her she should lay off the benzos. Oliver hypothesizes that the multiple severe stressors in her life led to Lauren's psychotic break. Dr. Amelia Frederick, from Hudson Oaks, appears at the hospital and encourages Lauren to check herself in there, but Oliver asks Lauren to be sure that's what she really wants. Lauren decides to go live with her sister instead. Muriel tells Carol the board was split on whether to give Carol her job back, so Muriel takes the blame, saying she told Carol to continue treating Alison. Muriel announces her retirement from being Chief Medical Officer.
16	3	"The Witness" "The Pusher"	Rob Seidenglanz	Daniela Lamas & Greg Murray	October 6, 2025	T13.26203	2.10
Van's ex, Michelle, who is a social worker, brings an autistic, non-speaking patient to the hospital because his caregiver, Gloria, fell onto the subway tracks, and Adam is a suspect. Oliver and his team, which now included Carol again, work to communicate with Adam while Gloria undergoes surgery to save her life. Jacob continues his ER rotation while Ericka tries to figure out who could have reported Carol. Dana eventually confesses to Ericka that it was her. Van and Michelle seem to be reigniting something, while Carol and the ER doctor, Anthony Thorne, flirt. Josh, however, seems to be avoiding Oliver—because it turns out he's the new CMO.
17	4	"Lady Liberty"	Sudz Sutherland	Ryan McGarry & William Yu	October 13, 2025	T13.26204	2.16
In a flash forward to five months in the future, Oliver is once again in Hudson Oaks, this time calling Josh for help because he says Hudson Oaks won't let him out. In the present time, Josh, as the new CMO, meets with the staff to discuss the hospital's budget woes. Josh asks Oliver to make a house call to one of the hospital's major donors, Arianna Burnett, who is under a conservatorship because of an early dementia diagnosis. In the course of treating her, Oliver discovers that it's not dementia but instead that her amygdala doesn't have a fear response. Things are tense between Ericka and Dana because Ericka is upset that Dana reported Carol. But Ericka is keeping something from Dana: her continued reliance on benzos she got in Mexico. Ericka runs into a frequent ER visitor, whom she thinks needs a more detailed workup to figure out if he really has schizophrenia, or if it's something else. Things are also tense between Charlie and the interns, but Dana tells Charlie she's the one who reported Carol. Josh sets Carol up on a date, but it doesn't go well, and Thorne seems to be jealous.
18	5	"Once Upon a Time in America"	Paris Barclay	Stasia Demick & Shannon Looney	October 20, 2025	T13.26205	2.24
Josh is thriving in his new role as CMO. He has brought a new nurse, Nico Silva, from Cards to Neuro to whip the floor into shape. Nico immediately gets on Oliver's case for not knowing the names of all the nurses. Two highrise window repair workers—brothers—fall 39 stories and arrive at Bronx General in critical condition. Josh says that the only way to save them is for him to perform the critical parts of both surgeries and have his fellows perform the support work. Josh proceeds to spend 14+ hours in surgery. As one patient emerges from a successful surgery, Oliver works on his neurological recovery. Carol works with the mother of the two brothers, a headstrong woman who speaks almost no English. An unexpected complication sends the recovering brother, Benny, back into surgery, where he dies. The other brother, Jorge, survives, but is in a coma. Ericka and Dana make up, but Jorge's mother, Ana, curses Josh for letting her son Benny die.
19	6	"The Doctor's Graveyard"	Seith Mann	Sara Saedi & Will Ewing	October 27, 2025	T13.26206	1.86
Oliver wakes from a nightmare. He's been sleeping in his office. He feels haunted by a patient he lost long ago. It's Halloween, and Josh feels cursed. He's worried about Jorge, the comatose patient he recently saved from death. A biohacker named Cyrus arrives at the hospital after a seizure that nearly killed him. Oliver and his team discover that Cyrus has a mass on his brain. The ER regular, Sam, is back, and Ericka is determined to help him. Sam agrees to stay for a few days for evaluation. Ericka confesses her benzo dependency to Jacob. Josh, having a crisis of confidence, doesn't want to operate on Cyrus, but Oliver gives him a pep talk. The surgery reveals that Cyrus has a tapeworm, not cancer. Through a vision, we see that Charlie knows the patient Oliver lost long ago…
20	7	"The One That Got Away"	Mädchen Amick	Davia Carter & Ariana Jackson	November 3, 2025	T13.26207	1.77
A patient comes to see Oliver because his life has been upended—by a song. At first Oliver doesn't recognize the patient: It's Tom, the exchange student who was Oliver's first love. He's experiencing seizures that manifest as musical hallucinations. The case becomes personal when Tom's husband appears, bringing up feelings for both Josh and Oliver. Meanwhile, Dana and Katie deepen their relationship as Dana meets Katie's friends. Ericka gets her schizo-affective patient, Sam, to consent to tests to determine if any of his symptoms have a neurological, rather than psychiatric cause. Dana confronts Ericka about her missing meds, and Ericka confesses that she's a mess—she took some of Dana's meds after the building collapse, and then got tons of benzos when she was in Mexico. Oliver's conversations with Tom lead him to tell Josh he wants to try again, but Josh says he's now seeing someone. Brokenhearted, Oliver watches Casablanca with Ericka, who tells Oliver she was adopted because her mom was schizophrenic and couldn't raise her.
21	8	"The Upside Down"	Harry Jierjian	Greg Murray & Ryan McGarry	November 17, 2025	T13.26208	1.76
An airplane pilot, Elle, must make an emergency landing without the captain, and while experiencing extreme visual disturbance. When she arrives at Bronx General, she is seeing everything upside-down. Working with the ER doctor, Thorne, Oliver determines that Elle has a rare type of migraine, which can be treated. Carol is away from the hospital, checking in with one of her patients, Hector, who is at Hudson Oaks. She's worried because his discharge has been delayed. Back at Bronx Gen, Jorge, the patient Josh saved from death, is still comatose, and his mother is losing patience and hope. Silva, the head nurse, announces drug tests, and Ericka panics because she's still taking benzos without a prescription. Oliver clashes with Charlie when he finds out that Charlie recommended hospice for Jorge. Carol notes that Oliver isn't himself—he would normally never yell at one of his subordinates. As Jorge wakes from his coma, Ericka asks Carol to recommend a therapist so she can get help. We flash forward FOUR MONTHS LATER to Hudson Oaks, where Oliver is now a patient—along with Hector, who has not yet been discharged.
22	9	"The Fire Fighter"	Charles Randolph-Wright	Michael Grassi & Daniela Lamas	November 24, 2025	T13.26209	1.86
A fire fighter, Matthew, arrives at Bronx Gen for a routine checkup for his ALS. His condition has reached the point where he can no longer manage alone. Sam, who has been away from the hospital and out of contact, shows up in the ER with acute liver failure. Sam needs a transplant, but he's very likely to be rejected because he is houseless, schizophrenic, and without familial support. Ericka goes on a mission to rectify the situation so that Sam can qualify for organ donation. In the personal lives of the doctors, Van has gotten back together with Michelle, and Oliver's mom, Muriel, has returned from vacation to plan the holiday gala. She goes to Oliver's house to make him Thanksgiving dinner and discovers that Oliver has basically not been back to his house in weeks—all of his ferns appear dead.
23	10	"The Resident"	DeMane Davis	Sara Saedi & Will Ewing	December 1, 2025	T13.26210	N/A
A ballerina arrives at Bronx General experiencing flashbacks to hallucinations she experienced while in the ICU several months earlier. Tensions between Oliver and Charlie escalate during the case. The interns and Michelle work frantically to get Sam a liver. Josh says Dr. Walker, from the transplant committee, will be at the holiday gala, which Hudson Oaks is sponsoring. At the gala, Carol, whose divorce has been finalized, flirts with Thorne, but discovers that he's there with a very young nurse. Ericka fails to persuade Walker to put Sam on the transplant list, so Oliver goes up to the podium and announces that Walker did what no one else would do: put a mentally ill patient on the transplant list. Walker has no recourse but to allow it. Charlie gets up to speak about why he became a doctor: It was because of the doctor who failed him and his family by giving them false hope. Oliver realizes Charlie is the son of the patient who haunts him. Outside, Charlie blames Oliver for his mom's prolonged suffering and dad drinking himself to death. He knows where Oliver's dad is, and gives Oliver the address. In shock, Oliver goes to the address and breaks in. Back at the hospital, Sam's liver transplant has been successful. Jacob finds Ericka, and they kiss. Michelle hasn't shown up at the gala. Van thinks she's stood him up, but she's been in a car accident.
24	11	"The Boy Who Feels Everything"	Kevin Rodney Sullivan	Michael Grassi & Stasia Demic	January 5, 2026	T13.26211	N/A
Katie and the other EMTs bring Michelle to Bronx General. Van and Dana race to the hospital, where Michelle is undergoing surgery. Oliver tells Carol that Charlie's gala speech was about him. Sensing Oliver's distress, Carol suggests therapy. Carol and Oliver evaluate Nic, the driver whose car hit Michelle's. He can't stop laughing despite having a clear drug test. Oliver tells Jacob he received a call from Dallas about a job referral. Oliver says he'd hate to lose Jacob. Jacob suggests that Nic may have pseudobulbar affect due to traumatic brain injury from playing hockey. Michelle's scans come in, showing that she is injured beyond recovery. Michelle wished to be an organ donor if she was declared brain dead. Van at first resists performing the brain death tests, but eventually accepts the test results. After Michelle's death, Van decides to leave Bronx Gen to take care of his son Liam. Jacob announces that he will be leaving, too. Oliver goes to his dad's apartment, where a woman named Sofia appears.
25	12	"The Rider"	Millicent Shelton	Davia Carter & William Yu	January 12, 2026	T13.26212	N/A
At his dad's apartment, Oliver talks to the woman named Sofia, who says she lives upstairs and waters Noah's plants when he's away. Oliver asks her about his dad. At Bronx Gen, Oliver tells Ericka and Dana he was the doctor in Charlie's gala speech. Dana asks Charlie, "So you came here for revenge?" Ericka and Dana have both applied for a grant, and Dana worries about competing against Ericka. Nico takes Oliver to see a new patient, Benson, a rodeo rider with strange symptoms. When Benson's girlfriend gives him hand sanitizer to drink, Oliver uncovers that Benson is an alcoholic who has tried everything to quit drinking. He has no "off switch." Oliver wants to give him one with deep brain stimulation surgery, which Josh refuses to approve. Carol suggests another surgeon: Josh's boyfriend, Beau. Oliver meets with Beau to arrange Benson's surgery, but when Beau later mentions Oliver, Josh says he doesn't know Oliver that well. Dana and Ericka interview for the grant, and Dana gets it.
26	13	"The Rabbit Hole"	Gregory Smith	Ariana Jackson & Shannon Looney	January 26, 2026	T13.26213	N/A
A patient named Nora shows up at the hospital exhibiting behaviors that concern her sorority sisters. Evaluating Nora, Oliver determines that she has catatonia. Ericka and Dana discover that the friend Nora keeps referring to is actually an AI chatbot. Overuse of the chatbot caused psychosis. Oliver asks Carol why Josh and Beau broke up in the past, and why they got back together. Carol tells him Josh wanted kids, but Beau wasn't ready—now he's ready. Sofia comes to the hospital because she has insomnia and other symptoms, and Oliver has agreed to treat her. Dana is anxious about having Carol as her advisor for the grant because she's the one who reported Carol for treating Alison (season 1). But Carol has already figured it out, and she and Dana clear the air. When Oliver finds out, however, he's angry that Carol didn't tell him and that Dana didn't come to him first. He tells Sofia he hates everyone except her. The episode ends with a flash forward (ONE WEEK LATER) to Oliver in Hudson Oaks. He finds Sofia in a room and says he's there to save her.
27	14	"The Invisible Man"	Holly Dale	Greg Murray & Ryan McGarry	February 2, 2026	T13.26214	N/A
A maintenance worker, Amos, is injured while working in the hospital basement. He needs brain surgery, but Josh is suddenly ill. There's no other surgeon available, so Josh calls Beau. When Beau arrives, he and Oliver find Josh having a heart attack—due to carbon monoxide released into the vents during Amos's accident. Josh needs oxygen or he'll die, but the hospital supply is running out, and, because of a snowstorm, they can't get more delivered. Oliver tells his team to take Josh to the basement. They put Josh in an old hyperbaric chamber, where pressure will increase the effectiveness of the oxygen they have. Beau and Nico go into the chamber to supervise. Beau is shocked when Josh, close to death, says: "Wolf." The hyperbaric chamber saves Josh's life—but Beau is now aware that Josh has lied to him about not knowing Oliver very well. In the chaos, Oliver forgets Sofia in the sleep study room, and she's furious with him. Oliver tells Carol Sofia could have died. Curious, Carol checks the footage from the sleep study—but there's no one on the footage but Oliver. Sofia was never there.
28	15	"The Missing Person"	Michael Goi	Daniela Lamas & Will Ewing	May 27, 2026	T13.26215	N/A
A young woman, Denise, arrives at Bronx Gen with panic-attack-like symptoms. Silva discovers she is on the NYPD missing persons list. Meanwhile, Dana and Katie discuss their relationship and possibly moving in together. Wolf hasn't shown up for work. Carol tells Josh she thinks Wolf hallucinated Sofia. Carol searches for Wolf, but finds only a recent hookup at Wolf's house. Rosie at the bike shop says that Wolf told them to sell his bike. At Bronx, Denise's evaluation shows she has a pheochromocytoma, a tumor. Denise's friend tells her family where she is, and they show up to see her. At first Denise refuses. She tells Carol her symptoms developed after three exhausting years of caring for her dad, who has dementia. Denise thought her body was telling her to leave, so she did. Josh successfully removes the tumor, and Denise talks to her brothers about assisted living for their father. Wolf shows up at Bronx, manic, saying he needs to go to Hudson Oaks to save Sofia. Carol, in tears, agrees to take him. He signs himself in voluntarily. Carol then goes to her daughter Maya's cello concert with Thorne.
29	16	"Senses"	Zachary Quinto	Michael Grassi & Sara Saedi	June 3, 2026	T13.26216	N/A
At Hudson Oaks, Wolf's assigned doctor is Amelia Frederick, who is always "poaching" patients from Bronx General. At Bronx Gen, Thorne calls the neuro team to examine Johnny, a chef with no pain response. Johnny insists on seeing Wolf, who treated his mom for MS. Wolf talks with Sofia and realizes she's not real. Upset, he attempts escape. Dr. Frederick and her staff tackle and sedate him. Later, he tells her he wants another doctor. Ericka takes Johnny to see Wolf. Charlie reprimands her, but Ericka says Wolf is still their boss—and he came up with the diagnosis. Dana confesses that she once checked herself into a psych facility. Meanwhile, the board wants to make Josh permanent CMO, but they want him to fire Wolf. Josh refuses. He suggests firing Charlie instead. In group therapy with a more sympathetic doctor, Dr. Adler, Wolf finally talks about his dad. Things heat up between Carol and Thorne after she breaks down and says she's tired of being the one who takes care of everyone. As the episode closes, Wolf has another visitor: Josh.
30	17	"Doctor, Interrupted"	Erica Dunton	Stasia Demick & Shannon Looney	June 10, 2026	T13.26217	N/A
Josh visits Wolf regularly at Hudson Oaks. They discuss Regan, the Howler of Hudson Oaks, who Wolf thinks may have a serious medical (not psychiatric) issue. He tells Dr. Frederick Regan needs a hospital and steroids. Dr. Frederick disagrees, so Wolf collects steroids from the other patients and offers them to Regan, who takes them and fakes a seizure in order to get admitted to the hospital. At Bronx Gen, Carol's relationship with Thorne heats up, while Beau deduces that Josh is visiting Wolf. Muriel offers Charlie a prestigious residency if he promises never to set foot in Bronx Gen again. Carol works with a newly married patient who is having sexual difficulties, while Josh works with Neuro to uncover the cause of Regan's hallucinations: a neurosarcoid, which Josh can remove. Charlie visits Wolf to apologize, and Wolf forgives him. After a successful surgery, Regan reunites with her children. Muriel arrives at Hudson Oaks to get Wolf. Carol waits outside with Wolf's motorcycle. Wolf says he wants to live life and get Josh back.
31	18	"Through the Looking Glass"	DeMane Davis	Teleplay by : Ariana Jackson & William Yu; Story by : Mica Unger	June 17, 2026	T13.26218	N/A
Back at home after his stay in Hudson Oaks, Wolf works to establish new habits. When he returns to work, he awkwardly and accidentally invites Josh (and Beau) to a dinner party at his house, then begs Carol to bring Thorne to fill the table. Young, fretful parents arrive at the ED with a sick baby, who turns out to have botulism. Carol and Wolf leave to help the police with a hostage situation at a bank robbery. The robber, Alyssa, suffers from distorted time and space perception. When a security guard shoots her, she is taken to Bronx Gen, where Wolf figures out that a bacterial infection from a prison tattoo caused her symptoms. Wolf apologizes to Dana for his reaction to her reporting Carol. They make up, and discuss the fact that Dr. Frederick may be taking advantage of vulnerable patients at Hudson Oaks. During Wolf's dinner party, Dana says she wants to investigate the matter. Josh shows up alone and confesses that he and Beau are taking a break while Josh figures out his feelings for Wolf.
32	19	"The Hero's Journey"	David Katzenberg	Teleplay by : Davia Carter & Greg Murray; Story by : Grace Stalley	June 24, 2026	T13.26219	N/A
Dana investigates Dr. Frederick and finds evidence of unethical patient care. She and Carol come up with a plan. Beau brings one of his patients, a teenager named Finn, to Bronx Gen because Finn is resisting care. Tests reveal a tumor best treated with an awake craniotomy, which Finn is reluctant to undergo because his first surgery paralyzed his legs. Josh is also reluctant to perform an awake surgery on such an anxious patient. Wolf's team works with Finn, and Josh agrees to perform the surgery. It's successful. Meanwhile, Dana and Carol meet with a rep from Hudson Oaks, who has reviewed the evidence and decides to replace Dr. Frederick. Despite her professional win, Dana's personal life suffers, and Katie breaks up with her. Dana drowns her sorrows in a bar where she flirts with Sofia. Beau asks Josh to marry him. Ericka asks Charlie if his private investigator contact can identify her bio mom. The P.I. finds a name. Wolf takes Carol to Noah's apartment, where he explains that he didn't hallucinate Sofia out of thin air. She's a real person: Noah's other child.
33	20	"The Way Home"	DeMane Davis	Teleplay by : Michael Grassi & Sara Saedi; Story by : Laura Craig	July 1, 2026	T13.26220	N/A
Now CMO, Josh has a family emergency when his dad’s Alzheimer’s dramatically worsens. After declining to help with alternative treatment, Beau tells Wolf he and Josh have broken up. Thorne and Carol disagree about how to handle a patient refusing open heart surgery. Sofia, whose real name is Margot, shows up looking for her brother, whom everyone is shocked to learn is Wolf. Margot tells Wolf their dad has died. Ericka locates her birth mom and tries to talk to her, but the woman denies she ever gave up a baby. Wolf thinks reminiscence therapy via baseball will help Josh’s dad reconnect, and he stages a game. After the game, Josh talks with his dad, who finally acknowledges Josh’s sexuality. Wolf gets home after helping Margot clean out Noah’s apartment. Josh is waiting, and he tells Wolf he loves him. Wolf says it back. They make out enthusiastically. Carol fights with Thorne because he went ahead with surgery on their patient. Investigators question Thorne because the patient’s wife was just found dead. In the closing scene, Oliver, Josh, and Carol, on vacation in Mexico, discover a medical emergency in the lobby of their hotel, leaving the series to end in a cliffhanger.

== Production ==
=== Development ===
In November 2019, it was announced that the series was in development at Fox, with the network landing the project with a script deal plus penalty. However, Fox did not go forward with the project. On January 24, 2023, the show's development was moved to NBC; it was given a series order on October 20, 2023. The series is created by Michael Grassi, and he is also expected to executive produce alongside Lee Toland Krieger, Greg Berlanti, Sarah Schechter, Leigh London Redman, Henrik Bastin, Melissa Aouate, Andy Serkis, Jonathan Cavendish, Will Tennant, and DeMane Davis. Production companies involved with the series are Grassi Productions, Berlanti Productions, Fabel Entertainment, The Imaginarium, Universal Television, and Warner Bros. Television.

Brilliant Minds was moved to the 2024–25 season due to strike-related production delays. On May 1, 2024, the name change from Dr. Wolf to Brilliant Minds was announced. The show was given a 13-episode order for the first season. On May 12, 2025, NBC renewed the series for a second season. On May 1, 2026, NBC canceled the series after two seasons.

=== Casting ===
On February 23, 2023, Zachary Quinto was cast to star. In April 2023, Teddy Sears, Tamberla Perry, Alex MacNicoll, Spence Moore II, Aury Krebs, and Ashleigh LaThrop joined the main cast. On November 28, 2023, Donna Murphy was cast in a recurring capacity. In July 2025, Brian Altemus, John Clarence Stewart, and Al Calderon joined the cast as new series regulars for the second season, while Bellamy Young was cast in a recurring capacity. On December 1, 2025, Sarah Steele joined the cast in a recurring role for the second season.

=== Filming ===
Principal photography for the series began on April 8, 2024, and concluded on August 23, 2024, in Toronto, Canada. Filming for the second season began on July 2, 2025 and concluded in early March 2026.

== Broadcast ==
Brilliant Minds premiered on September 23, 2024, on NBC. The second season premiered on September 22, 2025. In February 2026, the second season was pulled from NBC's midseason schedule, with The Voice airing two-hour episodes in its place. The remaining episodes of the second season premiered on May 27, 2026.

== Reception ==
=== Critical response ===
The review aggregator website Rotten Tomatoes reported an 88% approval rating based on 17 critic reviews. The website's critics' consensus reads, "Benefitting from a characteristically sharp performance by Zachary Quinto, Brilliant Minds is a medical procedural with brains but also a surprising amount of heart." Metacritic, which uses a weighted average, assigned a score of 64 out of 100 based on 10 critics, indicating "generally favorable" reviews.

In November 2025, guest star Eric Dane received praise for his performance as a firefighter battling ALS in the second season episode "The Fire Fighter", his first role since announcing his own ALS diagnosis in April 2025.

=== Ratings ===
==== Season 1 ====
Viewership and ratings per episode of Brilliant Minds
No.	Title	Air date	Rating/share (18–49)	Viewers (millions)	DVR (18–49)	DVR viewers (millions)	Total (18–49)	Total viewers (millions)	Ref.
1	"Pilot"	September 23, 2024	0.3/3	3.92	—N/a	—N/a	—N/a	—N/a	
2	"The Disembodied Woman"	September 30, 2024	0.3/3	3.46	—N/a	—N/a	—N/a	—N/a	
3	"The Lost Biker"	October 7, 2024	0.3/3	3.30	—N/a	—N/a	—N/a	—N/a	
4	"The Blackout Bride"	October 14, 2024	0.2/2	3.09	0.2	1.99	0.4	5.08	
5	"The Haunted Marine"	October 21, 2024	0.3/3	3.12	0.2	2.02	0.5	5.15	
6	"The Girl Who Cried Pregnant"	October 28, 2024	0.2/2	2.64	0.1	1.88	0.4	4.52	
7	"The Man From Grozny"	November 11, 2024	0.2/2	2.63	0.1	2.00	0.3	4.63	
8	"The Lovesick Widow"	November 18, 2024	0.2/2	2.98	0.2	1.68	0.3	4.66	
9	"The Colorblind Painter"	November 25, 2024	0.3/3	2.75	0.1	1.95	0.4	4.70	
10	"The First Responder"	December 2, 2024	0.3/3	2.82	0.1	1.81	0.4	4.63	
11	"The Other Woman"	December 9, 2024	0.2/2	2.52	0.1	1.77	0.3	4.29	
12	"The Doctor Whose World Collapsed"	January 6, 2025	0.2/3	2.82	0.1	1.06	0.3	3.89	
13	"The Man Who Can't See Faces"	January 6, 2025	0.2/3	2.54	0.1	1.16	0.3	3.70	

==== Season 2 ====
Viewership and ratings per episode of Brilliant Minds
No.	Title	Air date	Rating/share (18–49)	Viewers (millions)	DVR (18–49)	DVR viewers (millions)	Total (18–49)	Total viewers (millions)	Ref.
1	"Phantom Hook"	September 22, 2025	0.2/2	2.23	0.1	1.43	0.3	3.67	
2	"The Contestant"	September 29, 2025	0.2/2	2.32	0.1	1.31	0.3	3.63	
3	"The Witness"	October 6, 2025	0.1/1	2.10	0.1	1.24	0.2	3.34	
4	"Lady Liberty"	October 13, 2025	0.2/2	2.16	0.1	1.20	0.3	3.36	
5	"Once Upon a Time in America"	October 20, 2025	0.2/2	2.24	0.1	1.18	0.3	3.42	
6	"The Doctor's Graveyard"	October 27, 2025	0.1/1	1.86	0.1	1.25	0.2	3.10	
7	"The One That Got Away"	November 3, 2025	0.1/2	1.77	0.1	1.23	0.3	3.00	
8	"The Upside Down"	November 17, 2025	0.1/2	1.76	TBD	TBD	TBD	TBD	
9	"The Fire Fighter"	November 24, 2025	0.2/3	1.86	TBD	TBD	TBD	TBD	
