= The Island of the Colorblind =

1997 book by Oliver Sacks

- Author: Oliver Sacks
- Cover artist: Chip Kidd
- Language: English
- Subject: Achromatopsia
- Publisher: A.A. Knopf
- Publication date: 1997
- Media type: Print
- Pages: 336
- ISBN: 978-0-676-97035-7
- OCLC: 35235302
- Preceded by: An Anthropologist on Mars (1995)
- Followed by: Uncle Tungsten (2001)

The Island of the Colorblind is a 1997 book by neurologist Oliver Sacks about achromatopsia on the Micronesian atoll of Pingelap. It was published in the UK as The Island of the Colour-blind. The second half of the book is devoted to the mystery of Lytico-Bodig disease in Guam.

The subject was also presented in an episode of the BBC documentary series The Mind Traveller.
