= Smolov =

Smolov (Russian: Смолов) is a Russian masculine surname, its feminine counterpart is Smolova. The surname is derived from the Russian word смола (smola, meaning "resin"). It may refer to:

- Fyodor Smolov (born 1990), Russian football player
- Polina Smolova (born 1980), Belarusian pop singer
- Sybil Smolova, Czech-Austrian dancer and film actress of the silent era

== See also ==
- Smolov Squat Routine, a weight training program
