= The Man Who (play) =

Play by Marie-Hélène Estienne and Peter Brook

The Man Who: a theatrical research is the English text of this play by Peter Brook, co-authored by Marie-Hélène Estienne, and created in Paris with Brook's troupe at The Bouffes du Nord Theatre.

The play premiered as L'homme qui in 1993 after an extensive period of research, improvisation, and exploration. The initial inspiration for the play was the 1985 book The Man Who Mistook His Wife for a Hat by the eminent neurologist Oliver Sacks.
