= The Man Who Mistook His Wife for a Hat =

1985 book by Oliver Sacks

The Man Who Mistook His Wife for a Hat and Other Clinical Tales
- Cover
- Author: Oliver Sacks
- Language: English
- Subject: Neurology, psychology
- Genre: Case history
- Publisher: Summit Books (US); Gerald Duckworth (UK), Picador
- Publication date: 1985
- Publication place: United States
- Media type: Print; Audiobook
- Pages: 233 (first edition)
- ISBN: 0-671-55471-9
- OCLC: 12313889
- Dewey Decimal: 616.8 19
- LC Class: RC351 .S195 1985
- Preceded by: A Leg to Stand On (1984)
- Followed by: Seeing Voices (1989)

The Man Who Mistook His Wife for a Hat and Other Clinical Tales is a 1985 book by neurologist Oliver Sacks presenting narratives based on some of his patients. Sacks chose the title of the book from the case study of one of his patients who has visual agnosia, a neurological condition that leaves him unable to recognize faces and objects. The book became the basis of an opera of the same name by Michael Nyman, which premiered in 1986. While the book is often categorized as nonfiction, Sacks' private journals and correspondences have revealed that he embellished or fabricated some of its content.

The book comprises twenty-four essays split into four sections ("Losses", "Excesses", "Transports", and "The World of the Simple"), each dealing with a particular aspect of brain function. The first two sections discuss deficits and excesses (with particular emphasis on the right hemisphere of the brain), while the third and fourth sections describe phenomenological manifestations with reference to spontaneous reminiscences, altered perceptions, and extraordinary qualities of mind found in people with intellectual disabilities.

In addition to describing the cases, Sacks comments on them, explains their pathophysiological background, discusses potential neuroscientific implications of such cases and occasionally makes reference to some psychological concepts, such as the soul, id, ego, and super-ego.

In 2025, The New Yorker reported that Sacks considered the book to be riddled with falsifications and felt guilty over its success.

Sacks dedicated the book to Leonard Shengold.

== Contents ==
The book contains 24 "clinical tales" organized into four sections:

=== Part One: Losses ===
The Man Who Mistook His Wife for a Hat
Dr. P. is a singer and music teacher who has visual agnosia. He perceives separate features of objects, but cannot correctly identify them or the whole objects that they are part of. At first he supposes that diabetes has affected his vision, but an ophthalmologist suspects a neurological problem and refers him to Sacks. As he leaves Sacks' examination room during his first visit, he momentarily grabs his wife's head, supposing it to be his hat. Unable to treat Dr. P.'s problem, Sacks encourages him to focus on his musical interests, which remain intact. (The New Yorker has reported that "Dr. P."'s wife privately disagreed with Sacks over the portrayal of her husband in this account.)
The Lost Mariner
As a result of atypical Korsakoff syndrome acquired after a period of heavy drinking in 1970, Jimmie G. has both anterograde amnesia (an inability to form new memories) and retrograde amnesia (an inability to access many long-term memories). He can remember nothing of his life since the end of World War II, including events that happened only a few minutes ago. Occasionally, he can recall a few fragments of his life between 1945 and 1970, such as when he sees "satellite" in a headline and subsequently remarks about a satellite tracking job he had that could have occurred only in the 1960s. He believes it is still 1945 (the segment covers his life in the 1970s and early 1980s), and seems to behave as a normal, intelligent young man aside from his inability to remember most of his past and the events of his day-to-day life. He struggles to find meaning, satisfaction, and happiness in the midst of constantly forgetting what he is doing from one moment to the next.
The President's Speech
A ward of aphasiacs and agnosiacs listen to a speech given by an unnamed actor-president, "the old charmer" (presumably Ronald Reagan). Many of them laughed at the speech, while others were shocked. Sacks observes that while aphasiacs struggle with words, they can understand natural speech, because the words are paired with other expressive cues. They are acutely aware when the words and cues do not match. The agnosiacs perceived the president's words without understanding them, and found them illogically structured. One remarked that the President "does not speak good prose."
The Disembodied Lady
A woman loses her entire sense of proprioception (the sense of the position of parts of the body, relative to other neighboring parts of the body), due to acute polyneuropathy. Over the course of months, she learns to control her body by visual feedback alone.
The Man Who Fell out of Bed
While still a medical student, Sacks sees a patient on the floor of his hospital room, where he tells Sacks that he woke up to find a strange leg in his bed. Assuming that one of the nurses had played a prank on him, he attempted to toss the leg out of bed, only to find that he was attached to it. Although Sacks attempts to persuade the patient that the leg is his own, he remains bewildered in an apparent case of somatoparaphrenia.
Hands
Madeline J., a 60-year-old blind woman with cerebral palsy, had never used her hands functionally; she called them "useless lumps of dough". Sacks theorized that her inability was not due to incapacity but to lifelong neglect, which had prevented motor development. With encouragement and training, she gradually learned to use her hands and eventually began sculpting, revealing significant artistic ability.
Phantoms
Sacks explains how the brain's representation of the body can persist even after physical loss. He describes the mysterious and powerful ways the nervous system constructs bodily awareness. The story serves as an introduction to the complex relationship between physical reality and neural perception.
On the Level
A patient has lost his innate sense of balance due to Parkinson's-like symptoms that have damaged his inner ears. The patient, comparing his sense of balance to a carpenter's spirit level, suggested constructing a similar level inside a pair of glasses. This enables him to judge his balance by sight and after a few weeks, the task of keeping his eye on the level became less tiring.
Eyes Right!
A woman in her sixties has hemispatial neglect. She completely forgets the idea of "left" relative to her own body and the world around her. When nurses place food or drink on her left side, she fails to recognize that they are there. Dr. Sacks attempts to show the patient the left side of her body using a video screen setup; when the patient sees the left side of her body, on her right, she is overwhelmed with anxiety and asks for it to stop.

=== Part Two: Excesses ===
Witty Ticcy Ray
Ray is a man with Tourette syndrome whose tics disrupt his life but also fuel his creativity as a jazz drummer. After some trial and error, Dr. Sacks helps Ray find an optimal medication schedule that balances control and self-expression.
Cupid's Disease
An elderly woman's mild neurosyphilis causes increased energy and flirtatiousness. Sacks reflects on how neurological conditions can sometimes enhance mood and personality.
A Matter of Identity
A man with Korsakoff's syndrome (a condition characterized by severe memory loss) is unable to form new memories. He continually invents fictional identities and stories to make sense of his surroundings. The chapter explores how memory shapes identity and how the mind tries to maintain coherence even when memory fails.
Yes, Father-Sister
A woman's fluent-but-nonsensical speech illustrates how a person's speech can remain grammatically intact while losing meaning.
The Possessed
A woman with Tourette's syndrome experiences uncontrollable tics and vocalizations, but also exhibits remarkable creativity and energy. The chapter explores the complex relationship between neurological disorder, personality, and artistic expression.

=== Part Three: Transports ===
Reminiscence
Two elderly women experience auditory hallucinations: one hears childhood songs, the other such noises as ringing, hissing, and rumbling. A neurological examination links the episodes to seizure activity in the temporal lobe of the brain. The hallucinations draw on memories that carry strong personal and emotional associations.
Incontinent Nostalgia
Sacks briefly discusses patients whose long-buried memories and emotions reawakened after treatment with L-Dopa, revealing how the past endures in the brain and how it can be “activated under special conditions.”
The Dog Beneath the Skin
After a night under the influence of amphetamines, cocaine, and PCP, Stephen D., a 22-year-old medical student, wakes to find he has a tremendously heightened sense of smell (hyperosmia). (Sacks revealed many years later that he, in fact, was Stephen D.)
The Visions of Hildegard
Migraine-induced visual and mystical auras of Hildegard of Bingen.

=== Part Four: The World of the Simple ===
Rebecca
A young woman has a congenital intellectual disability that is likely related to developmental disorders. Despite her low IQ and struggles with conventional learning, she possesses a deep emotional intelligence, creativity, and an intuitive understanding of social and artistic expression. While traditional testing and assessments label her as severely limited, Sacks observes that Rebecca flourishes in artistic and imaginative spaces, such as theater and storytelling. When placed in an environment where emotional and social intelligence matter more than logic and structured learning, she demonstrates profound abilities that defy her clinical diagnosis.
The Twins
Dr. Sacks meets twin brothers who are autistic savants. They can neither read nor perform multiplication, yet they make a game of finding very large prime numbers. While the twins are able to spontaneously generate these numbers, from six to twenty digits, Sacks has to resort to a book of prime numbers to join in with them. The twins also instantly count 111 dropped matches, simultaneously remarking that 111 is three 37s.
The twins in question had already been studied extensively, and no ability to identify primes had been reported. In his private journal, Sacks wrote this case was the "most flagrant example" of his distortions.
The Autist Artist
A 21-year-old named José had seizures, and had been deemed "hopelessly retarded". When Sacks asks him to draw his pocket watch, however, he composes himself and draws the watch in surprising detail.

== Authenticity of the stories ==
In 2006, Makoto Yamaguchi published an article in the Journal of Autism and Developmental Disorders questioning the veracity of the story "The Twins". Dr. Yamaguchi doubted that there was a book of large prime numbers as described, and pointed out that reliable scientific reports had supported only approximate perception when rapidly counting large numbers of items.

In 2009, autistic savant Daniel Tammet also commented on "The Twins", observing that since the two brothers provided the matchbox, they could have counted the matchsticks within before arriving at the office. Tammet also shared that he finds the number 111 to be "particularly beautiful and matchstick-like".

In December 2025 (10 years after Sacks' death), The New Yorker reported that the commercial success of The Man Who Mistook His Wife for a Hat stirred feelings of guilt in Sacks, who wrote in his journal about the "lies" and "falsification" in the book. In a letter written to his brother in 1985 (the year of the book's publication), Sacks admitted that The Man Who Mistook His Wife for a Hat contained half-true "fairy tales"—or, in his brother's words, "confabulations".

== In popular culture ==
Christopher Rawlence wrote the libretto for a chamber opera—directed by Michael Morris with music by Michael Nyman—based on the title story. The Man Who Mistook His Wife for a Hat was first produced by the Institute of Contemporary Arts in London in 1986. A television version of the opera was subsequently broadcast in the UK.

Peter Brook adapted Sacks's book into an acclaimed theatrical production, L'Homme Qui..., which premiered at the Théâtre des Bouffes du Nord, Paris, in 1993. An Indian theatre company performed a play entitled The Blue Mug, based on the book, starring Rajat Kapoor, Konkona Sen Sharma, Ranvir Shorey, and Vinay Pathak.

The Man Who, an album by the Scottish indie pop band Travis, is named after this book.

== See also ==
- An Anthropologist on Mars, 1995 Sacks book
- Proprioception
- Aphasia
- Blindsight
- Hemispatial neglect
- V. S. Ramachandran
- Daniel Levitin
- Steven Pinker
