= Shirl Jennings =

Regained sight after blindness (1940–2003)

Shirley Jennings (1940 – October 26, 2003) was one of only a few people in the world to regain his sight after lifelong blindness and was the inspiration for the character of Virgil Adamson in the movie At First Sight (1999) starring Val Kilmer and Mira Sorvino.

== Early life ==
Born in Bedford County, Virginia, in 1940, at age 3, Jennings became dangerously ill with three illnesses at once: meningitis, polio, and cat scratch fever. "His sickness plunged him into a coma, from which he emerged after two weeks with paralyzed legs and damaged eyesight. When he was 7 or 8, Jennings was diagnosed with retinitis pigmentosa, a progressive, untreatable disease of the retina that causes blindness. By the time he was 10, he could distinguish only light from dark. He attended the Virginia School for the Deaf and the Blind and later the YMCA School of Swedish Massage."

== Treatment and return of sight ==
In 1991, at the urging of his then-girlfriend, Barbara, Jennings visited ophthalmologist Dr. Trevor Woodhams to investigate opportunities to restore his sight. Woodhams suggested surgery to remove his dense cataracts and to determine the true underlying condition of his retinas. Woodhams believed that the removal of the cataracts would return some of Jennings's vision.

The surgery did restore some of Jennings's vision. However, he was overwhelmed with visual sensory data and was unable to connect what he was seeing with his visual memory, which had all but disappeared. The family contacted Dr. Oliver Sacks, a famous neurologist known for his book Awakenings, who, along with other physicians, concluded that Jennings would need to relearn how to identify objects that he could feel and smell by using their visual cues. Jennings's extraordinary journey was featured in a 1995 article in The New Yorker magazine, "To See and Not See", by Sacks, and reproduced in Sacks's book An Anthropologist on Mars.

== Re-loss of sight ==
In February 1992, Jennings contracted pneumonia, which led to respiratory failure that deprived his brain of oxygen. After recovering, while he could still see some colors and movement, his sight virtually vanished.

== Personal life ==
Jennings reconnected with his future wife Barbara in 1988 after learning that Barbara, a woman he had dated 20 years earlier, had since divorced and moved back into the Atlanta, Georgia, area. They were married in 1991.

In 1996, Jennings began taking painting lessons and became a painter. His first solo art show was held in 2002 at the Center Street Arts Gallery in Conyers, Georgia.

== Film ==
Shirl and Barbara Jennings became the inspiration for the characters of Virgil Adamson and Amy Benic in the movie At First Sight (1999), starring Val Kilmer and Mira Sorvino. Val Kilmer spent time with Jennings in preparation for portraying him in the film.

== Death ==
Jennings died from chronic obstructive pulmonary disease in 2003 at the age of 63.
