= Molly Sweeney =

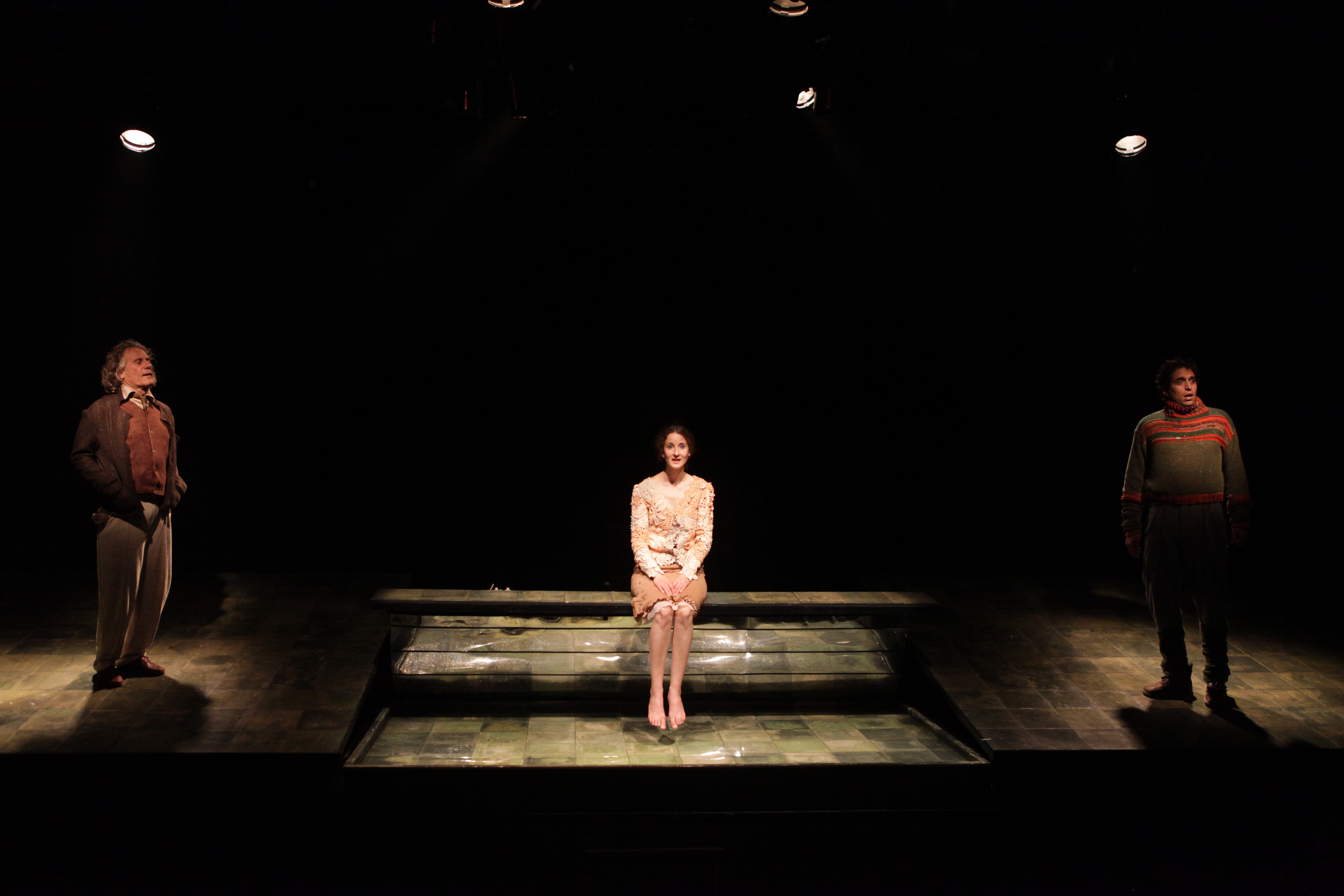
Molly Sweeney in Jerusalem Khan Theatre, 2011

Molly Sweeney is a two-act play by Brian Friel. It tells the story of its title character, Molly, a woman blind since infancy who undergoes an operation to try to restore her sight. Like Friel's Faith Healer, the play tells Molly's story through monologues by three characters: Molly, her husband Frank, and her surgeon, Mr. Rice.

It enjoyed considerable success on the stage, but attracted little critical interest, perhaps because of its superficial similarities to Faith Healer (1979), another play composed of a series of monologues delivered on an empty stage by characters who have no interaction. This play is about a blind woman in Ballybeg who constructed for herself an independent life rich in friendships and sensual fulfillment, and her ill-fated encounter with two men who destroy it and cause her madness: Frank, the man she marries who becomes convinced that she can only be complete when her vision is restored, and Mr. Rice, a once-renowned eye surgeon who uses Molly to restore his career. In a note in the programme of the 1996 Broadway production, Friel says that the story was inspired in part by Oliver Sacks's essay "To See and Not See".

== Production history ==
Molly Sweeney received its first performance on August 9, 1994, at the Gate Theatre, Dublin. It was directed by Friel and featured Catherine Byrne as Molly, Mark Lambert as Frank Sweeney, and T. P. McKenna as Mr. Rice.

It received its American premiere in 1996 in an Off Broadway production at the Roundabout Theatre. Catherine Byrne again starred as Molly, Alfred Molina played her husband Frank, and Jason Robards played Mr. Rice. It won the Lucille Lortel Award for Outstanding Play and the New York Drama Critics' Circle Award for Best Foreign Play.

The play was revived at the Print Room theatre in west London in 2013, with Dorothy Duffy starring as Molly.

The play was in large part inspired by the essay by neurologist Oliver Sacks, "To See and Not See", published in An Anthropologist on Mars.
