= The Anatomist =

The Anatomist may refer to:

== Film and theatre ==
- The Anatomist, a 1696 play by Edward Ravenscroft
- Several fictionalized accounts of the Burke and Hare murders, including:
  - A 1930 play by James Bridie, and subsequent 1937 television treatment
  - A 1939 film adaptation of Bridie's play, starring Bruce Seton
  - A 1948 London stage play starring Alastair Sim
  - A 1956 British television film starring Alistair Sim, released Feb. 6, 1956 on British television and later theatrically released in the US in 1961
  - The Anatomist by James Bridie, a 1980 film treatment directed by Julian Amyes

== Literature ==
- The Anatomist (novel), a 1996 novel by Federico Andahazi
- The Anatomist (2008 book), by Bill Hayes, about Gray's Anatomy
