= Insomniac City =

2017 memoir by Bill Hayes

Insomniac City: New York, Oliver, and Me
- Author: Bill Hayes
- Subject: Oliver Sacks, Bill Hayes, New York City
- Genre: memoir
- Publisher: Bloomsbury
- Publication date: February 14, 2017
- Pages: 291
- ISBN: 978-1-62040-495-9 (first edition)
- OCLC: 971246712
- Website: https://www.billhayes.com/book/insomniac-city-new-york-oliver-and-me/

Insomniac City: New York, Oliver, and Me (also subtitled New York, Oliver Sacks, and Me) is a 2017 memoir by writer and photographer Bill Hayes, primarily recounting his life in New York City and his romantic relationship with neurologist and writer Oliver Sacks over the last seven years of Sacks' life. The book is composed of vignettes narrated in prose, interspersed with poetry and diary entries, and is illustrated with Hayes' photographs.

== Synopsis ==
=== Relationship with Sacks ===
In 2009, following the sudden death of his partner of sixteen years, Hayes rented out his San Francisco apartment and moved to New York City.

Hayes had had a passing social relationship with the neurologist Oliver Sacks, who had written him in 2008 to praise his book The Anatomist. When Hayes moved to New York, his relationship with Sacks – a fellow insomniac, and at 75 nearly thirty years his senior – soon turned romantic. Sacks had hidden his homosexuality from most people, and had lived a largely celibate life; at the start of his relationship with Hayes, it had been three and a half decades since his last romantic encounter. Hayes eventually moved into Sacks' building, though they maintained separate apartments.

In Insomniac City, Hayes reverently describes Sacks' unique and curious mind. The two would use marijuana together (Sacks preferred edibles), and Sacks would report on vivid visual hallucinations, partly owing to his significantly impaired eyesight. Sacks was an eccentric: he was fascinated by the chemical elements, insisted on wearing swim goggles to open a bottle of champagne, and was utterly unaware of popular culture (he did not know who Michael Jackson was). He enjoyed playing classical piano, and the couple shared a love of music. They would often visit botanical gardens, and the mineralogy collection at the American Museum of Natural History. Hayes' book is peppered with Sacks' idiosyncratic musings: "Are you conscious of your thoughts before language embodies them?" Of Hayes, he said "I've suddenly realized what you mean to me: you create the need which you fill, the hunger you sate. Like Jesus. And Kierkegaard. And smoked trout..."

Hayes began keeping a diary at Sacks' suggestion. He describes caring for Sacks, who suffered a number of age-related infirmities, including sciatica, a bad knee, and significant hearing loss. He writes, "I help him get ready for bed – 'de-sock' him, fill his water bottle, bring him his sleeping tablets, make sure he has something to read."

=== Sacks' death ===
In early 2015, Sacks was diagnosed with terminal liver cancer, a recurrence of a rare ocular melanoma which had afflicted him nine years earlier. He read his own CT scan and determined the diagnosis himself. He declared his wish to avoid heroic life-prolonging measures, preferring to focus on living and working in as much comfort as possible in the time he had. He committed himself to finishing numerous writings, telling Hayes, "writing is more important than pain." Sacks made his diagnosis public with an essay in the New York Times on February 19, 2015.

In 2015, Sacks' autobiography On the Move: A Life was published. In it, he publicly revealed his homosexuality, and described his relationship with Hayes, to whom he dedicated the book. The publication date was moved up so that Sacks could see the book released. Sacks died on August 30, 2015, aged 82, at his New York home, with Hayes at his side.

=== Relationship with New York City ===
Throughout Hayes' memoir, he documents his relationship with New York City: he describes his feelings about various subway lines, the changing of seasons, and his brief encounters with an assortment of characters – shopkeepers, skateboarding teens, street artists, and homeless people – who are often his photographic subjects. Hayes writes of New York, "It requires a certain kind of unconditional love to love living here. But New York repays you in time in memorable encounters, at the very least."

== Reception ==
Kirkus Reviews called Insomniac City "a unique and exuberant celebration of life and love". The New York Times described Hayes' poetry as "pedestrian", but his photographic portraits as "frank, beautiful, bewitching". Brain Pickings called the book a "dual love letter...a lyrical reminder that happiness and heartache are inseparably entwined".

The book was named to Amazon's "best biographies and memoirs of 2017" list. It has been translated into Korean.

== Film adaptation ==
Hayes has completed a screenplay for a film adaptation of Insomniac City, in development by Brouhaha Entertainment as of December 2024. The film will be directed by Dominic Cooke who will also co-write with Hayes and star Jonathan Bailey as Hayes and Bill Nighy as Sacks.
