= Pavel Tsatsouline =

Belarusian fitness instructor

- Павел Цацулін
- Born: Minsk, Belarusian SSR, Soviet Union (present-day Belarus)
- Education: Belarusian State University of Physical Training
- Occupation: Personal trainer

Pavel Tsatsouline (Note: Belarusian: Павел Цацулін, romanized: Pavyel Tsatsulin, polonized: Paveł Caculin) is a Belarusian-born fitness instructor. He has introduced Spetsnaz training techniques from the former Soviet Union to US Navy SEALs, Marines and Army Special Forces, and shortly thereafter to the American public. He is also the Chairman of StrongFirst, Inc, a fitness education training company.

Tsatsouline is particularly notable for popularizing the kettlebell in the modern era in the West, most notably through his books and through a series of instructional videos, delivered with his trademark humor, comically exploiting Russian stereotypes with a thick accent, a dungeon-esque setting, and frequent use of the word "comrade". Vic Sussman among others praised Tsatsouline's videos because their power as training tools in part stemmed from the emphasis on kettlebells as fun. Pavel's strength training exercises were solely focused on practical strength and mobility. For him bigger did not always mean stronger.

He holds a degree in Sports Science from the Physical Culture Institute in Minsk. He is involved with the evolving field of martial arts fitness, specifically Brazilian jiu-jitsu and grappling, and is a proponent of the kettlebell as an exercise and strengthening tool. In 1998, Tsatsouline became a kettlebell instructor in the United States.

Tsatsouline claims to have been a PT drill instructor for Spetsnaz, the elite Soviet special forces unit, during the late 1980s (when Tsatsouline was in his teenage years).

In 2001, Tsatsouline was voted a "Hot Trainer" by Rolling Stone, pictured with a kettlebell in hand. He was considered the father of the kettlebell and popularized the usage of kettlebell exercise to increase strength. He has published articles in Milo magazine and Performance Press, as well as being the author of several books on stretching and strength training (see Bibliography).

In 2012, Pavel left the RKC and formed a new company, StrongFirst.

== Selected bibliography ==
Publications that were (and remain) important to the normalization of kettlebell and other spetsnaz strength training techniques being adopted into American Gym culture are listed below:

- Power to the People!: Russian Strength Training Secrets for Every American (2000). ISBN 0-938045-19-9.
- Bullet-Proof Abs (2000). ISBN 0-938045-25-3.
- The Russian Kettlebell Challenge (2001). ISBN 0-938045-32-6.
- Relax into Stretch: Instant Flexibility Through Mastering Muscle Tension (2001). ISBN 0-938045-28-8.
- From Russia with Tough Love: Pavel's Kettlebell Workout for a Femme Fatale (2002). ISBN 0-938045-43-1.
- The Naked Warrior (2003). ISBN 0-938045-55-5.
- Beyond Bodybuilding (2005). ISBN 0-938045-66-0.
- Enter the Kettlebell (2006). ISBN 0-938045-69-5.
- Return of the Kettlebell: Explosive Kettlebell Training for Explosive Muscle Gains (2010). ISBN 978-0-938045-06-9.
- Super Joints: Russian Longevity Secrets for Pain-Free Movement (2011). ISBN 978-0938045366.
- Hardstyle Abs (2012). ISBN 0-938045-50-4.
- Kettlebell Simple and Sinister (2013). ISBN 0-989892-40-9.
- The Quick and the Dead (2019). ISBN 978-0-9898924-2-1.
- Kettlebell Axe (2023). ISBN 978-0989892452.

== See also ==
- Smolov Squat Routine
