= Hallucinations (book) =

Accounts of hallucinations, by Oliver Sacks

- Author: Oliver Sacks
- Language: English
- Subject: Neurology, psychology
- Publisher: Knopf/Picador, a division of Random House
- Publication date: 6 November 2012
- Publication place: United States
- Pages: 352 (First edition)
- ISBN: 978-0-307-95724-5
- OCLC: 769425353
- Preceded by: The Mind's Eye (2010)

Hallucinations is a 2012 book written by the neurologist Oliver Sacks. In Hallucinations, Sacks recounts stories of hallucinations and other mind-altering episodes of both his patients and himself and uses them in an attempt to elucidate certain features and structures of the brain including his own migraine headaches.

== Summary ==
Hallucinations was written with the intention to remove the stigma of hallucinations in the eyes of society and the medical world. The book is separated into fifteen chapters; each chapter pertains to a different observation of hallucinations made by Sacks. The hallucinations mentioned in this book come from the everyday citizen and his own experiences, which are used to connect the structure and function of the brain of a healthy person to the symptom of hallucination. Sacks also mentions the positive effects of hallucinations in culture and art.

Sacks notes that the symptom of hallucinations have a negative connotation that was created by society. The purpose of Hallucinations was to take away the public fear of symptoms relating to mental illness by showcasing many instances where healthy individuals experienced hallucinations. Sacks also uses this book to educate society on the different types of hallucinations and the neurological basis behind hallucinations.

== Awards and honors ==
- 2014 Wellcome Book Prize shortlist
