= Bill Hayes (writer) =

American writer and photographer (born 1961)

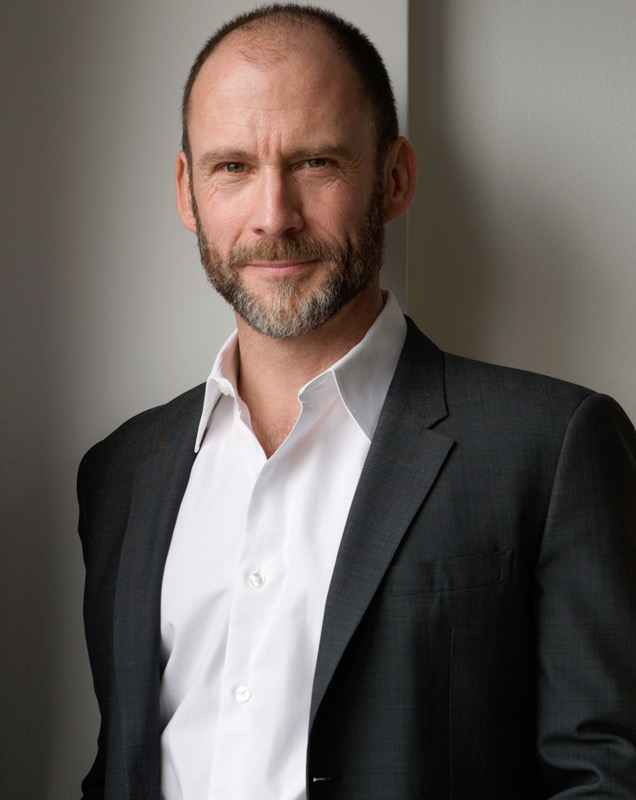
- Born: 8 June 1961 (age 65); Minneapolis, Minnesota, U.S.
- Education: Santa Clara University
- Partner: Oliver Sacks (2009–2015, deceased)
- Writing career
- Notable works: Sleep Demons, Five Quarts, The Anatomist, Insomniac City
- Notable awards: Guggenheim Fellowship
- Website: billhayes.com

William Brooke Hayes (born June 8, 1961) is an American non-fiction writer and photographer. He has written five books – Sleep Demons, Five Quarts, The Anatomist, Insomniac City and Sweat – and has produced one book of photography, How New York Breaks Your Heart. His freelance writing has appeared in a number of periodicals, most notably The New York Times.

== Writing ==
Hayes' first book, Sleep Demons, was published in 2001. An exploration of insomnia and other sleep disorders, Sleep Demons is part memoir, part trivia collection, and part record of scientific discovery. His second book, Five Quarts: A Personal and Natural History of Blood was published in 2005. In it, Hayes details the history of the scientific exploration of blood, and its many cultural associations. He also recounts his own relationship with an HIV-positive partner, and the science and emotion involved in treating HIV. The Anatomist, published in 2008, is a history of Gray's Anatomy, released 150 years after its first publication.

Hayes was awarded a Guggenheim Fellowship for non-fiction in 2013.

Hayes' fourth book, 2017's Insomniac City: New York, Oliver, and Me, is a memoir of his life in New York City, and his six-year relationship with neurologist and writer Oliver Sacks.

Hayes has written extensively for The New York Times. His writing has also appeared in BuzzFeed, The Guardian, The New York Review of Books, T: The New York Times Style Magazine, and The Wall Street Journal. He is the Creative Director of the Oliver Sacks Foundation, and co-edited Sacks' posthumous works, Gratitude and The River of Consciousness. Hayes' fifth book, Sweat, a history of exercise, was published in 2022.

Hayes lists Joan Didion, Diane Arbus, and Susan Sontag as literary influences.

== Photography ==
After learning about photography from his mother as a child, Hayes took up photography again in 2007. His photographs have appeared in the Times, The New Yorker, and Vanity Fair. In 2017, he stated that he was as serious about photography as he is about writing, and that he considered his photos in Insomniac City to be a third narrative strand.

How New York Breaks Your Heart, Hayes first book of photography, was published in February 2018. It features 150 street photos Hayes took of New Yorkers. Twenty-four of these were displayed in the Steven Kasher Gallery in Chelsea, Manhattan (which represents Hayes) from February 15 to March 17, 2018.

== Personal life ==
Hayes was born in Minneapolis, Minnesota, the fifth of six children, five of them girls. He remains close with his sisters. His mother Jean was an artist; his father John a military man who had lost an eye as a paratrooper in the Korean War. When Bill was three, the family moved to Spokane, Washington, where his father bought a Coca-Cola bottling plant. His mother opened an art school, where Hayes learned to develop and print film. Hayes was close with his maternal grandmother, Helen, from the age of eleven until he left home for college. In high school, Hayes was drawn to the writing of Joan Didion. Hayes attended Santa Clara University in California.

Hayes knew he was gay at a young age, though he had relationships with women in high school and college. He came out at age 24, and considers his orientation to be a core part of his identity.

Hayes' father never accepted him as a gay man and did not maintain a relationship with him, but when John Hayes developed dementia, he came to believe Bill was an old Army friend, and spoke with him warmly. Bill's mother also suffered from dementia until her death in 2011.

Hayes lived in San Francisco for many years, where he worked at the San Francisco AIDS Foundation. His partner of sixteen years was HIV-positive. In 2009, Hayes moved to New York City, where he had a relationship with neurologist and writer Oliver Sacks, until the latter's death in 2015. Hayes' experiences in New York and his six-year relationship with Sacks are the subject of his book Insomniac City.

Hayes has described his adult life as "colored by death" – the deaths he dealt with in his AIDS Foundation work, the death of his longtime partner in San Francisco, and later the death of his partner Oliver Sacks.
