= On the Move: A Life =

Memoir by Oliver Sacks

- First edition
- Author: Oliver Sacks
- Genre: Autobiography
- Publisher: Knopf
- Publication date: 2015

On the Move: A Life (2015) is the second autobiography written by Oliver Sacks. The first was Uncle Tungsten: Memories of a Chemical Boyhood (2001).
