= Leonard Shengold =

American psychiatrist (1925–2020)

- Born: December 5, 1925; Syracuse, New York
- Died: February 4, 2020 (aged 94); Stone Ridge, New York
- Education: Columbia University (BA); Long Island College of Medicine (PhD)
- Known for: Studies on child abuse
- Scientific career
- Fields: Child psychiatry
- Workplaces: New York University School of Medicine

Leonard Shengold (December 5, 1925 – February 4, 2020) was an American psychiatrist known for his studies on child abuse.

== Biography ==
Shengold was born on December 5, 1925, in Syracuse, New York. Both his parents were Jewish, and his father was a watchmaker originating from Minsk and his mother a homemaker from Vilnius. During his youth, he noted that his father was prone to having severe angina attacks and died when he was 12 years old. He attended Syracuse University for one semester before transferring to Columbia College, where he studied under Lionel Trilling, who sparked his interest in Freud and psychoanalysis.

He joined the United States Army during World War II and served in India as a radio operator and then as a clerk in North Africa and Saudi Arabia. He then returned to Columbia after the war, graduating in 1947, and received his medical degree from Long Island College of Medicine, now known as SUNY Downstate Health Sciences University. He was also trained at what is now known as the Psychoanalytic Association of New York, affiliated with the New York University School of Medicine.

He started career as a training analyst at the institute, as well as its director from 1975 to 1978, and taught psychiatry at New York University. He received a Sigourney Award for advancing work in psychoanalysis in 1997.

Shengold was known for his studies of child abuse, observing the damage of childhood on numerous adult patients and equated the long-term physical, psychological, and sexual abuse and neglect of children by their adult parents as "soul murder". Drawing from clinical cases and literary works of Rudyard Kipling, Anton Chekhov and Charles Dickens, he argued that helpless children easily fall prey to their tormentors because of their physical and emotional dependence on them, and grew up identifying with the abuser and repeating the experiences of abuse. In addition to treating adult victims of childhood, he also treated writer and neurologist Oliver Sacks for nearly a half-century.

Michiko Kakutani credited Shengold for having formulated "a modern psychiatric definition of soul murder" in reviewing his 1989 book Soul Murder: The Effects of Childhood Abuse and Deprivation (1989). Harold F. Blum said that Shengold's work had been valuable in fathoming the psychological depth of childhood abuse and identifying the key role of unconscious fantasies in understanding traumatic experiences.

Shengold died of leukemia on February 4, 2020, at the age of 94.
