= Seeing Voices =

Book by Oliver Sacks

Seeing Voices: A Journey Into the World of the Deaf
- Author: Oliver Sacks
- Language: English
- Subject: Deaf studies, sign language
- Publisher: University of California Press (first U.S. edition)
- Publication date: August 1989
- Publication place: United States
- Media type: Print -- Hardcover (First Edition)
- Pages: 180 (first edition)
- ISBN: 0-5200-6083-0
- OCLC: 19455916
- Dewey Decimal: 305.9/08162 20
- LC Class: HV2370 .S23 1989
- Preceded by: The Man Who Mistook His Wife for a Hat (1985)
- Followed by: An Anthropologist on Mars (1995)

Seeing Voices: A Journey Into the World of the Deaf is a 1989 book by neurologist Oliver Sacks. The book covers a variety of topics in Deaf studies, including sign language, the neurology of deafness, the history of the treatment of Deaf Americans, and linguistic and social challenges facing the Deaf community. It also contains an eyewitness account of the March 1988 Deaf President Now student protest at Gallaudet University, the only liberal arts college for deaf and hard of hearing in the world. Seeing Voices was Sacks' fifth book.

== Reception ==
Critics of Seeing Voices agreed that the book is highly informative. Publishers Weekly described it as "extraordinarily moving and thought-provoking". While Debra Berlanstein of Library Journal characterized the book as insightful, she wrote that it seems more suited to a scholarly audience than some of Sacks' more popular books.

== Editions ==
This list only provides details for the most significant editions

- First U.S. Edition: University of California Press, 1989, hardcover, 180 pages, ISBN 0-5200-6083-0.
- First Canadian Edition: Stoddart Publishing, 1989, hardcover, 180 pages, ISBN 0-7737-2374-9.
- 1990-91: Six more editions.
- U.S. Reprint: Vintage Books (Knopf Publishing), 2000, paperback, 240 pages, ISBN 0-3757-0407-8.
- U.S. updated paperback edition (HarperPerennial), 1990, 186pp, ISBN 0-0609-7347-1
