= The Mind's Eye (Sacks book) =

2010 book by Oliver Sacks

- Author: Oliver Sacks
- Cover artist: Chip Kidd
- Language: English
- Subject: Neurology
- Publisher: Knopf
- Publication date: 2010-10-26
- ISBN: 978-0-307-27208-9
- Preceded by: Musicophilia: Tales of Music and the Brain (2007)
- Followed by: Hallucinations (2012)

The Mind's Eye is a 2010 book by neurologist Oliver Sacks. The book contains case studies of people whose ability to navigate the world visually and communicate with others have been compromised, including the author's own experience with cancer of the eye and his lifelong inability to recognise faces.

== Case studies ==
One of the case studies concerns Susan R. Barry, nicknamed "Stereo Sue," whom Sacks wrote about in 2006. Due to strabismus, she lived without stereoscopic vision for 48 years, but became able to see stereoscopically through vision therapy.

Another case study is of the acclaimed concert pianist Lilian Kallir, who suffered from posterior cortical atrophy yet was surprisingly resilient despite the numerous deficits it caused; the effect on her musical abilities was particularly notable. While her memory and personality were intact, she had problems processing visual stimuli, and was no longer able to read words or music, yet for years lived an extremely active life, frequently performing entirely from memory, with no one but her husband knowing she had any problems.

Another case study was about a vivacious, social woman named Pat who suffered a stroke that resulted in aphasia; a complete inability to speak or understand words. One chapter is devoted to the case of Howard Engel, author of a popular series of mystery novels. Due to a small stroke, he developed alexia sine agraphia; an inability to read, while retaining the ability to write.

== Reception ==
Bryan Appleyard, reviewing the book for Literary Review, wrote: "Sacks the doctor once again dramatises the most strange and thrilling scientific and cultural issue of our time—the nature of the human mind—through the simple act of telling stories."
