= DeMane Davis =

American director and producer

- Born: 1967; Roxbury, Massachusetts
- Website: demanedavis.com

DeMane Davis (born 1967 or 1968) is an American film and television director and producer.

Originally from Roxbury, Massachusetts, Davis's first production was 1997's Black & White & Red All Over, which she co-wrote with Khari Streeter.

== Lift (2001) ==
In 2001, Davis and Streeter worked together again, co-directing the crime-thriller Lift, which premiered at the Sundance Film Festival. Lift starred Kerry Washington as a young woman who works in a department store but who is also a professional shoplifter—a so-called "booster". Davis says that she based the character on real-life boosters in her hometown, including her sister-in-law. Rapper Sticky Fingaz also appeared in the film.

Davis and Streeter received a $250,000 grant from Sundance to produce the film, and found a small production company in Boston which provided the remainder of the $3 million budget. Lift was later broadcast on Showtime and BET and won the Grand Jury prize at the 2001 Urbanworld Film Festival.

== Television (2018–present) ==
After her first two films found some success, she moved from Boston to New York, where she worked for an agency writing and directing advertisements. Davis finally got the opportunity to direct longer pieces again when Ava DuVernay asked her to direct an episode of DuVernay's 2016–2022 television drama, Queen Sugar. This opportunity led to her producing and directing for other episodic television productions, including How to Get Away With Murder, Station 19, The Red Line, and You. She also directed two of the four episodes of the Netflix limited series Self Made about the life of Madam C. J. Walker.

In 2021 Davis signed a multi-year, exclusive deal with Warner Bros. Television Group as co-executive producer with DuVernay on the superhero drama, Naomi. In 2022, she directed the pilot of NBC's Found. As of 2025 she is the director and executive producer of Brilliant Minds.
