= A Leg to Stand On =

1984 book by Oliver Sacks

- Book cover, first edition
- Author: Oliver Sacks
- Language: English
- Publisher: HarperCollins
- Publication date: 1984
- ISBN: 978-0060925444

A Leg to Stand On is a 1984 autobiographical account by neurologist Oliver Sacks describing his recovery from psychogenic leg paralysis following a mountaineering accident. The book has been described as a skillful description of the depersonalization of functional neurological symptoms. Neuropsychiatric specialists who have recommended reading the book to their patients have found it can help them cope with their depersonalization symptoms.

== Synopsis ==
On an early Saturday morning, Oliver Sacks geared up to climb a mountain in the Hardangerfjord in Norway. Despite the overcast and sullen weather, Sacks reached the summit before noon. However, he had not been alone. A bull stood no more than a few feet in front of him. Sacks, in a futile attempt to remain calm, lost his composure and tumbled down the side of the mountain landing atop his twisted left leg. After examining the injury, Sacks determined that the entire quadriceps had been torn from the patella, leaving his leg useless. Sacks made a makeshift splint to immobilize his injured leg in order to slowly slide down the mountain, though he lost hope as the sun began setting. Fortunately, a couple of reindeer hunters found Sacks lying on the path during the last bits of light and were able to transport him to a local hospital for treatment.

Upon arriving at the hospital, Sacks was diagnosed with a torn quadriceps and was transferred to another hospital in Bergen to have an operation done to reattach the muscle. According to Sacks's surgeon Mr. Swan, the surgery was a success; however, Sacks was not convinced that it was. It had become quite obvious that the leg was not healing properly upon the arrival of the physiotherapist and Sacks's inability to contract the quadriceps no matter how hard he had tried. The following morning, Sacks was woken up to his leg hanging off the side of the bed and a feeling of nauseating estrangement towards the limb. Sacks had described it as a "foreign inconceivable thing." Sacks, having experienced something similar to this with a patient of his from the past, determined that he must have acquired some form of "anosognosia" as a result of his accident. Unfortunately, the physicians treating Sacks did not acknowledge his illness on the basis that the operation was a success and anything that the patient was experiencing was simply a result of his own hysteria.

Two weeks following the operation, Sacks begins to experience involuntary electrical pulses down his leg - something he attributed to neurological recovery. However, this improvement did nothing to improve Sacks's mental state. Although, when a friend of Sacks brought him his recorder and a cassette of Mendelssohn's Violin Concerto, the music brought back Sacks's hope along with his love and appreciation for life. The next day, Sacks had his cast removed, but he could not shake the estrangement he felt towards the now naked limb.

During a seemingly futile session with the physiotherapist, Sacks had the notion to play music while attempting to perform an exercise. He meditated on the music and without thought, he stood on both legs and miraculously began to walk with the music despite weakness. Sacks described this epiphany as the most eventful and crucial ten minutes of his life. The patient now began to recover.

Sacks was then moved to a convalescent home in Highgate, London, England referred to at the time as Caen Wood. There, Sacks met a group of fellow patients and veterans who offered him solace by sharing their own stories about the war and how they deal with their phantom limb syndrome (the ironic opposite of Sacks's ordeal). Sacks found that this group of men had been more wise and understanding than any doctor that had treated him. Upon permanent removal of his cast, Sacks found his leg remained numb to the touch despite his progress with recovery. It had been determined that the lack of sensitivity was due to a severance in the femoral nerve that had occurred during his operation, thereby, inhibiting any nerve activity and causing Sacks to feel disconnected from the leg (It was only four years later that Sacks was put through nerve conduction tests to better understand the severity of the nerve damage). Oliver Sacks then graduated from the convalescence home and found himself in the office of Mr. W.R. of Harley Street. Mr. W.R. asked Sacks what he enjoyed doing most before the incident. When Sacks responded with swimming, Mr. W.R. called up a lifeguard and sent Sacks on his way to a local pool. Upon arriving, the lifeguard pushed Sacks into the pool (on Mr. W.R.'s directions) despite his protests. Feeling outraged and challenged, Sacks began to swim without any regard to disability until the lifeguard told him he was finished. Without any thought, Sacks got out of the pool and began to walk around normally despite the notion that his left leg was still limp. Sacks was left astonished by Mr. W.R.'s simple and effective solution to being incapable of physical activity: "condelectari sibi."

The next morning, Sacks received a letter from his friend Professor Luria outlining the possible reasons for the alienation Sacks felt towards the leg along with possible treatments. At this point, Sacks has been met with such clarity and support allowing him to finally heal.

== Reception ==
Vic Sussman from the Washington Post Book World wrote "[i]n calling for a neurology of the soul and a deeper more humane medicine, Sacks's remarkable book raises issues of profound importance for everyone interested in humane health care and the human application of science."

Ronald Carson from Johns Hopkins University Press wrote "A Leg to Stand On is a marvelous mixture of neurological observation, psychological insight, mystical experience, and speculative vision." Jon Stone of the Western General Hospital in Edinburgh, writing for the Journal of Neurology, Neurosurgery and Psychiatry defined it "a unique autobiographical account of functional paralysis".
