= An Anthropologist on Mars =

1995 book by Oliver Sacks

- Author: Oliver Sacks
- Language: English
- Genre: Essays, Science, Medicine, Neurology
- Publisher: Alfred A. Knopf
- Publication date: February 7, 1995
- Publication place: United States
- Media type: Print (Hardcover and Paperback) and Audio Cassette
- Pages: 327 (First Edition)
- ISBN: 0-679-43785-1 (First Edition)
- OCLC: 30810706
- Dewey Decimal: 616.8 20
- LC Class: RC351 .S1948 1995
- Preceded by: Seeing Voices (1989)
- Followed by: The Island of the Colorblind (1997)

An Anthropologist on Mars: Seven Paradoxical Tales is a 1995 book by neurologist Oliver Sacks consisting of seven medical case histories of individuals with neurological conditions such as autism and Tourette syndrome. An Anthropologist on Mars follows up on many of the themes Sacks explored in his 1985 book, The Man Who Mistook His Wife for a Hat, but here the essays are significantly longer and Sacks has more of an opportunity to discuss each subject with more depth and to explore historical case studies of patients with similar symptoms. In addition, Sacks studies his patients outside the hospital, often traveling considerable distances to interact with his subjects in their own environments. Sacks concludes that "defects, disorders, [and] diseases... can play a paradoxical role, by bringing out latent powers, developments, evolutions, forms of life that might never be seen, or even be imaginable, in their absence" (p. xvi).

== Essays ==
- "The Case of the Colorblind Painter" discusses an accomplished artist who is suddenly struck by cerebral achromatopsia or the inability to perceive color due to brain damage.
- "The Last Hippie" describes the case of a man suffering from the effects of a massive brain tumor, including anterograde amnesia, which prevents him from remembering anything that has happened since the late 1960s.
- "A Surgeon's Life" describes Sacks' interactions with Dr. Carl Bennett, a surgeon and amateur pilot with Tourette syndrome. The surgeon is often beset by tics, but these tics vanish when he is operating.
- "To See and Not See" is the tale of Shirl Jennings, a man who was blind from early childhood, but was able to recover some of his sight after surgery. This is one of an extremely small number of cases where an individual regained sight lost at such an early age, and as with many of the other cases, the patient found the experience to be deeply disturbing.
- "The Landscape of His Dreams" discusses Sacks' interactions with Franco Magnani, an artist obsessed with his home village of Pontito in Tuscany. Although Magnani has not seen his village in many years, he has constructed a detailed, highly accurate, three-dimensional model of Pontito in his head.
- "Prodigies" describes Sacks' relationship with Stephen Wiltshire, a young autistic savant described by Hugh Casson as "possibly the best child artist in Britain".
- "An Anthropologist on Mars" describes Sacks' meeting with Temple Grandin, an autistic woman who is a world-renowned designer of humane livestock facilities and a professor at Colorado State University. The title of this essay comes from a phrase Grandin uses to describe how she often feels in social interactions.

The 1999 film At First Sight is based on the fourth essay, "To See and Not to See". The Brian Friel play Molly Sweeney was also inspired by this essay. The 2011 film The Music Never Stopped is based on the second essay, "The Last Hippie".

== Reviews ==
- Kakutani, Michiko. "Book of the Times; Finding the Advantages in Some Mind Disorders" Review of An Anthropologist on Mars: Seven Paradoxical Tales by Oliver Sacks. New York Times Book Review, February 14, 1995

== See also ==
- Awakenings, a 1973 non-fiction book by Oliver Sacks. It recounts the life histories of those who had been victims of the 1920s encephalitis lethargica epidemic.
