= The River of Consciousness =

Collection of ten essays by Oliver Sacks

- First edition (US)
- Author: Oliver Sacks
- Published: October 2017
- Publisher: Pan Macmillan (UK); Knopf (US)
- Publication place: United States
- Media type: Print (hardcover)
- Pages: 237
- ISBN: 978-0-804-17100-7

The River of Consciousness is a collection of ten essays by the writer, naturalist, and neurologist Oliver Sacks. Some of the essays are dedicated to specific figures such as Darwin, Freud, and William James.

== Synopsis ==
The River of Consciousness compiles the following essays:

1. Darwin and the Meaning of Flowers
2. Speed
3. Sentience: The Mental Lives of Plants and Worms
4. The Other Road: Freud as a Neurologist
5. The Fallibility of Memory
6. Mishearings
7. The Creative Self
8. A General Feeling of Disorder
9. The River of Consciousness
10. Scotoma: Forgetting and Neglect in Science

== Reception ==
The Chicago Tribune reviewed The River of Consciousness, Praising Sacks' "ability to braid wide reading". In a review for the Wall Street Journal Laura J. Snyder notes that the volume "reminds us, in losing Sacks we lost a gifted and generous storyteller.” In a review published by The Guardian the physician Gavin Francis writes: For those thousands of correspondents, The River of Consciousness will feel like a reprieve – we get to spend time again with Sacks the botanist, the historian of science, the marine biologist and, of course, the neurologist.
