= Smolov Squat Routine =

Weight training program

The Smolov Squat Routine is a weight training program for increasing squat strength, originating from Russia. It is named after its creator, Sergey Smolov “the Russian Master of Sports”.

The squat routine is a strength program broken down into four phases which last for a total of 13 weeks.

The four phases are:

1. Phase In — A two-week phases that uses a variation of squats and lunges.
2. Base Cycle — A 4-week segment which requires 4 squat sessions a week. You will re-test your one-repetition maximum at the end of this cycle.
3. Switching Cycle — Squat negatives and Olympic type lifts such as the power clean are utilized.
4. Intense Mesocycle — Three squat sessions a week are programmed leading up to the final squat test to measure your strength gains.

It is considered one of the most difficult squat routines around with recommendations that only elite level athletes use the program due to the high frequency and volume.

Throughout the program, Smolov demands three to four days per week, with some weeks squatting back to back days.

Strength gains have been noted between 50–130 pounds (22–58 kg).

Popularized by Pavel Tsatsouline through his books.
