= Uncle Tungsten =

Book by Oliver Sacks

Uncle Tungsten: Memories of a Chemical Boyhood
- Author: Oliver Sacks
- Cover artist: John Gall
- Language: English
- Genre: Memoir; Science
- Publisher: Vintage Books
- Publication date: 2001
- Publication place: United States
- Pages: 317
- ISBN: 0-375-40448-1
- OCLC: 46937635
- Dewey Decimal: 616.8/092 B 21
- LC Class: RC339.52.S23 A3 2001
- Followed by: Oaxaca Journal (2002)

Uncle Tungsten: Memories of a Chemical Boyhood is a memoir by Oliver Sacks about his childhood published in 2001. The book is named after Sacks's Uncle Dave, whom Oliver nicknamed Uncle Tungsten because he was secretary of a business named Tungstalite, which made incandescent lightbulbs with a tungsten filament. Uncle Tungsten was fascinated with tungsten and believed it was the metal of the future. According to family members, Oliver used the single nickname, Uncle Tungsten, to refer to a combination of Dave with several other individuals in the same family.

Sacks' middle name is 'Wolf', and in most European (especially Germanic, Spanish and Slavic) languages, tungsten is named "Wolfram", which is the origin of the chemical symbol W.

The book combines autobiographical elements with a primer in the history and science of chemistry. However, it is not all about his youthful passion for chemistry, but also is eclectic, relating his memories of the catastrophic fire at the Crystal Palace, his terrible experiences of sadism at school, his interest in amateur chemistry, and a passing obsession with coloring his own black-and-white photographs in his home laboratory.

== Reception ==
Upon release, Uncle Tungsten was generally well-received among the British press.
