= Vic Sussman =

American newspaper and radio journalist

- Born: Victor Stephan Sussman; November 21, 1939; Queens County, New York, U.S.
- Died: November 22, 2004 (aged 65); Washington, D.C.
- Education: American University
- Occupation: Journalist
- Spouses: Betsy Sussman (divorced); Megin Walsh Sussman
- Children: Noah Sussman; Rachel Sussman; Brendan Sussman

Vic Sussman was the nickname of Victor Stephan Sussman (November 21, 1939 – November 22, 2004) an American newspaper and radio journalist. He was best known for writing about vegetarianism and the internet but was also influential in the recumbent bicycle and stage magic communities.

== Education ==
Sussman received a bachelor's and a master's degrees in communications from American University.

== Involvement with the Internet ==
Sussman was one of the first American journalists whose full-time beat was the Internet. He was directly involved in two historic events: the first public use of chat by a Vice President of the United States and the first email sent from the North Pole.

The bulk of Sussman's notable contributions to the Internet community occurred in the early to mid 90s while working for US News and The Washington Post. During the late 1990s and early 2000s Sussman worked on Internet and Web projects for America Online and Cahners Publishing. He also had a brief career as a speaker at conferences and corporate events, where he talked about the future of the Internet.

=== US News & World Report ===
Sussman worked for U.S. News & World Report from 1989 to 1996. During the early 1990s he began covering the emerging Information Superhighway. He wrote articles that helped to bring public attention to the arrest of Kevin Mitnick and the criminal investigation of Phil Zimmermann by the US Customs Service.

In 1994 Sussman was involved with the planning and execution of an "electronic town meeting" in which Vice President Al Gore answered questions posted via Compuserve chat. This marked the first time that a member of the Oval Office had used online chat to communicate with the public.

Sussman was also the recipient of the first email sent from the North Pole. The email was sent in August 1995 by Mike Powers, commander of the Coast Guard ice breaker Polar Sea.

=== The Washington Post ===
In 1996 Sussman was hired by The Washington Post and worked for the newly launched washingtonpost.com. While there he created a live chat discussion forum called Live Online (later rebranded as live.washingtonpost.com). Sussman also hosted a show called Love It, Hate It, Rate It which encouraged audience members to voice their opinions via online chat.

== Organic farming and vegetarianism ==
Sussman owned a two-acre farm in Potomac and worked as an organic farmer. He pressed his own apple cider and raised goats for milk and yoghurt. His house was heated with wood that he cut. He had no television and he ran up to six miles a day.

The Vegetarian Alternative was Sussman's first book, published in 1978. It was co-authored by his wife, Betsy Sussman. Sussman favoured a lacto-ovo-vegetarian diet.

He also authored a book, Easy Composting in 1982.

== Selected publications ==
- The Vegetarian Alternative: A Guide to a Healthful and Humane Diet (Rodale Press, 1978)
- Never Kiss a Goat on the Lips: The Adventures of a Suburban Homesteader (Rodale Press, 1981)
- Easy Composting (Rodale Press, 1982)
