= Oliver Sacks =

British neurologist and writer (1933–2015)

Oliver Sacks CBE FRCP
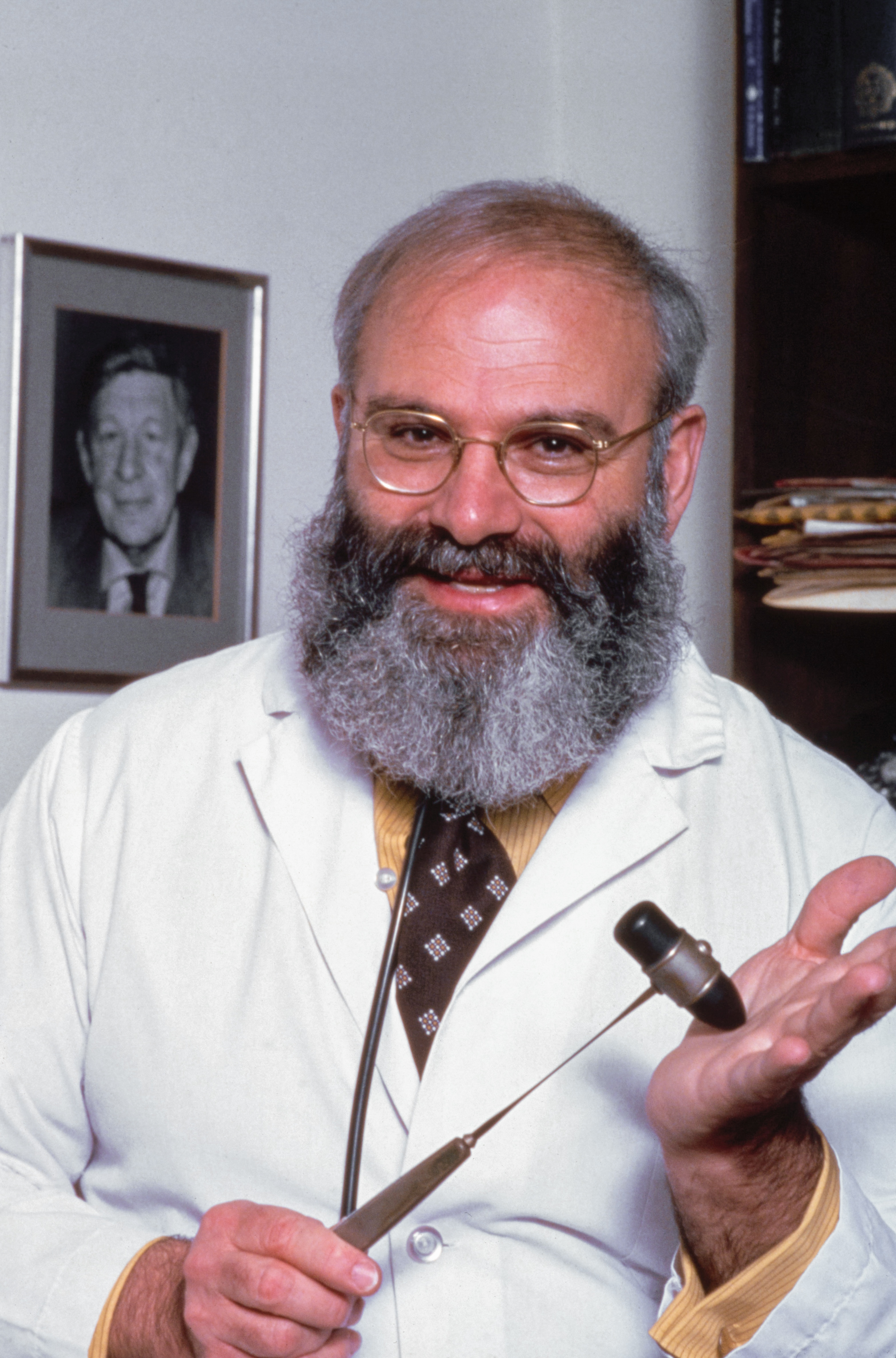
- Sacks in 1985
- Born: Oliver Wolf Sacks; 9 July 1933; London, England
- Died: 30 August 2015 (aged 82); New York City, U.S.
- Education: University of Oxford (BA, BM BCh)
- Known for: Non-fiction books about his psychiatric and neurological patients
- Partner: Bill Hayes (2009–2015)
- Medical career
- Profession: Physician, professor, author, neurologist
- Institutions: New York University; Columbia University; Albert Einstein College of Medicine; University of Warwick; Little Sisters of the Poor
- Sub-specialties: Neurology
- Website: oliversacks.com

Oliver Wolf Sacks (9 July 1933 – 30 August 2015) was a British neurologist, naturalist, historian of science, and writer.

Born in London, Sacks received his medical degree in 1958 from The Queen's College, Oxford, before moving to the United States, where he spent most of his career. He interned at Mount Zion Hospital in San Francisco and completed his residency in neurology and neuropathology at the University of California, Los Angeles (UCLA). Later, he served as neurologist at Beth Abraham Hospital's chronic-care facility in the Bronx, where he worked with a group of survivors of the 1920s sleeping sickness encephalitis lethargica epidemic, who had been unable to move on their own for decades. His treatment of those patients became the basis of his 1973 book Awakenings, which was adapted into an Academy Award-nominated feature film, in 1990, starring Robin Williams and Robert De Niro. His other best-selling books were mostly collections of case studies of people, including himself, with neurological disorders. He also published hundreds of articles (both peer-reviewed scientific articles and articles for a general audience), about neurological disorders, history of science, natural history, and nature. Journals and letters written by Sacks, discovered after his death, indicate that some of his work was embellished or exaggerated.

The New York Times called him a "poet laureate of contemporary medicine", and "one of the great clinical writers of the 20th century". Some of his books were adapted for plays by major playwrights, feature films, animated short films, opera, dance, fine art, and musical works in the classical genre. His book The Man Who Mistook His Wife for a Hat, which describes the case histories of some of his patients, became the basis of an opera of the same name. The television series Brilliant Minds is based on his life.

== Early life and education ==
Oliver Wolf Sacks was born in Cricklewood, London, England, the youngest of four children born to Jewish parents: Samuel Sacks, a Lithuanian Jewish doctor (died June 1990), and Muriel Elsie Landau, one of the first female surgeons in England (died 1972), who was one of 18 siblings. She would sometimes bring home deformed fetuses from work, where she would dissect them with her son as a way for him to learn about human anatomy. Sacks had an extremely large extended family of eminent scientists, physicians and other notable people, and he was first cousins with Nobel Laureate Robert Aumann and the Israeli statesman Abba Eban, through whom he was also related to the British director Jonathan Lynn. (Note: Although it has been said that Sacks was a cousin of the former Chief Rabbi of the United Kingdom Jonathan Sacks, Baron Sacks, the two were not related. This confusion may be due to an obituary written by Oliver Sacks's nephew Jonathan Sacks.)

In December 1939, when Sacks was six years old, he and his older brother Michael were evacuated from London to escape the Blitz, and sent to a boarding school in the English Midlands where he remained until 1943. Unknown to his family, at the school, he and his brother Michael "subsisted on meager rations of turnips and beetroot and suffered cruel punishments at the hands of a sadistic headmaster." This is detailed in his first autobiography, Uncle Tungsten: Memories of a Chemical Boyhood. Beginning with his return home at the age of 10, under his Uncle Dave's tutelage, he became an intensely focused amateur chemist. Later, he attended St Paul's School in London, where he developed lifelong friendships with Jonathan Miller and Eric Korn.

=== Study of medicine ===
During adolescence he shared an intense interest in biology with these friends, and later came to share his parents' enthusiasm for medicine. He chose to study medicine at university and entered The Queen's College, Oxford in 1951. The first half studying medicine at Oxford is pre-clinical, and he graduated with a Bachelor of Arts (BA) degree in physiology and biology in 1956.

Although not required, Sacks chose to stay on for an additional year to do research after he had taken a course by Hugh Macdonald Sinclair. Sacks recalls, "I had been seduced by a series of vivid lectures on the history of medicine and nutrition, given by Sinclair ... it was the history of physiology, the ideas and personalities of physiologists, which came to life." Sacks then became involved with the school's Laboratory of Human Nutrition under Sinclair. Sacks focused his research on the patent medicine Jamaica ginger, a toxic and commonly abused drug known to cause irreversible nerve damage. After devoting months to research he was disappointed by the lack of help and guidance he received from Sinclair. Sacks wrote up an account of his research findings but stopped working on the subject. As a result he became depressed: "I felt myself sinking into a state of quiet but in some ways agitated despair."

His tutor at Queen's and his parents, seeing his emotional state, suggested he extricate himself from academic studies for a period. His parents then suggested he spend the summer of 1955 living on Israeli kibbutz Ein HaShofet, where the physical labour would help him. Sacks later described his experience on the kibbutz as an "anodyne to the lonely, torturing months in Sinclair's lab". He said he lost 60 pounds (27 kg) from his previously overweight body as a result of the healthy, hard physical labour he performed there. He spent time travelling around the country with time spent scuba diving at the Red Sea port city of Eilat, and began to reconsider his future: "I wondered again, as I had wondered when I first went to Oxford, whether I really wanted to become a doctor. I had become very interested in neurophysiology, but I also loved marine biology; ... But I was 'cured' now; it was time to return to medicine, to start clinical work, seeing patients in London."

My pre-med studies in anatomy and physiology at Oxford had not prepared me in the least for real medicine. Seeing patients, listening to them, trying to enter (or at least imagine) their experiences and predicaments, feeling concerned for them, taking responsibility for them, was quite new to me ... It was not just a question of diagnosis and treatment; much graver questions could present themselves—questions about the quality of life and whether life was even worth living in some circumstances.

— Oliver Sacks

In 1956, Sacks began to study medicine at the University of Oxford and Middlesex Hospital Medical School. For the next two-and-a-half years, he took courses in surgery, orthopaedics, paediatrics, neurology, psychiatry, dermatology, infectious diseases, obstetrics and other disciplines. During his years as a student, he helped home-deliver a number of babies. In 1958, he graduated with Bachelor of Medicine, Bachelor of Surgery (BM BCh) degrees, and, as was usual at Oxford, his BA was later promoted to a Master of Arts (MA Oxon) degree.

After completing his medical degree, Sacks began his pre-registration house officer rotations at Middlesex Hospital the following month. "My eldest brother, Marcus, had trained at the Middlesex," he said, "and now I was following his footsteps." Before beginning his house officer post, he said he first wanted some hospital experience to gain more confidence, and took a job at a hospital in St Albans where his mother had worked as an emergency surgeon during the war. He then did his first six-month post in Middlesex Hospital's medical unit, followed by another six months in its neurological unit. He completed his pre-registration year in June 1960, but was uncertain about his future.

== Beginning life in North America ==
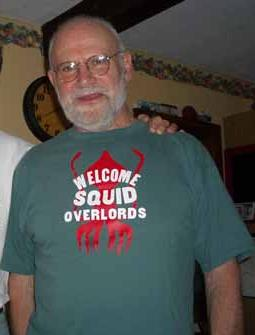
Sacks in 2005

Sacks left Britain and flew to Montreal, Canada, on 9 July 1960, his 27th birthday. He visited the Montreal Neurological Institute and the Royal Canadian Air Force (RCAF), telling them that he wanted to be a pilot. After some interviews and checking his background, they told him he would be best in medical research. But as he kept making mistakes, including losing data from several months of research, destroying irreplaceable slides, and losing biological samples, his supervisors had second thoughts about him. Dr. Taylor, the head medical officer, told him, "You are clearly talented and we would love to have you, but I am not sure about your motives for joining." He was told to travel for a few months and reconsider. He used the next three months to travel across Canada and deep into the Canadian Rockies, which he described in his personal journal, later published as Canada: Pause, 1960.

In 1961 he arrived in the United States, completing an internship at Mt. Zion Hospital in San Francisco and a residency in neurology and neuropathology at UCLA. While in San Francisco, Sacks became a lifelong close friend of poet Thom Gunn, saying he loved his wild imagination, his strict control, and perfect poetic form. During much of his time at UCLA, he lived in a rented house in Topanga Canyon and experimented with various recreational drugs. He described some of his experiences in a 2012 New Yorker article, and in his book Hallucinations. During his early career in California and New York City he indulged in:

staggering bouts of pharmacological experimentation, underwent a fierce regimen of bodybuilding at Muscle Beach (for a time he held a California record, after he performed a full squat with 600 pounds across his shoulders), and racked up more than 100,000 leather-clad miles on his motorcycle. And then one day he gave it all up—the drugs, the sex, the motorcycles, the bodybuilding.

He wrote that after moving to New York City, an amphetamine-facilitated epiphany that came as he read a book by the 19th-century migraine doctor Edward Liveing inspired him to chronicle his observations on neurological diseases and oddities; to become the "Liveing of our Time". Though he was a United States resident for the rest of his life, he never became a citizen. He told The Guardian in a 2005 interview, "In 1961, I declared my intention to become a United States citizen, which may have been a genuine intention, but I never got round to it. I think it may go with a slight feeling that this was only an extended visit. I rather like the words 'resident alien'. It's how I feel. I'm a sympathetic, resident, sort of visiting alien."

== Career ==
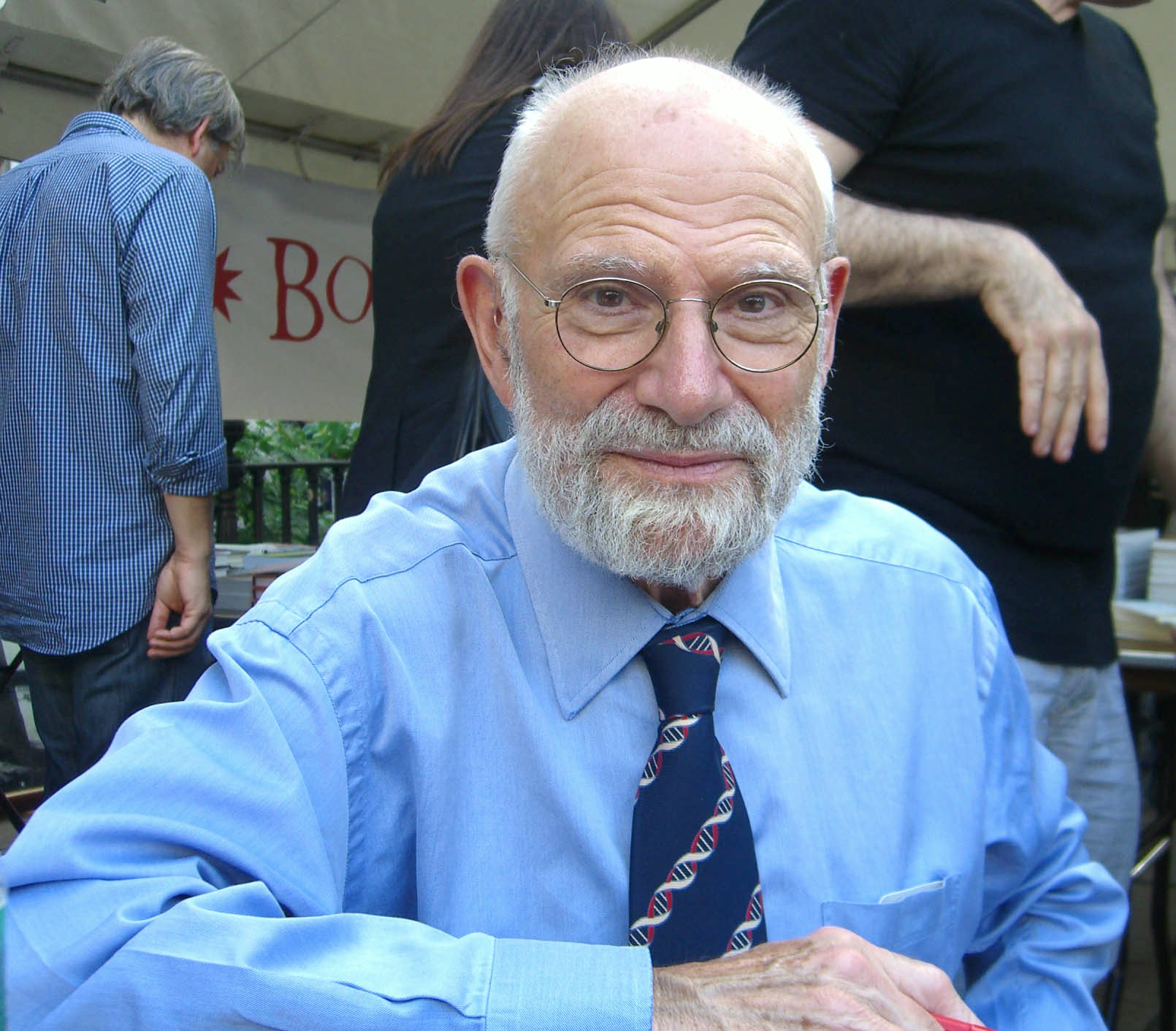
Sacks in 2009

Sacks served as an instructor and later professor of clinical neurology at Yeshiva University's Albert Einstein College of Medicine from 1966 to 2007, and also held an appointment at the New York University School of Medicine from 1992 to 2007. In July 2007 he joined the faculty of Columbia University Medical Center as a professor of neurology and psychiatry. At the same time he was appointed Columbia University's first "Columbia University Artist" at the university's Morningside Heights campus, recognising the role of his work in bridging the arts and sciences. He was also a visiting professor at the University of Warwick in the UK. He returned to New York University School of Medicine in 2012, serving as a professor of neurology and consulting neurologist in the school's epilepsy centre.

Sacks's work at Beth Abraham Hospital helped provide the foundation on which the Institute for Music and Neurologic Function (IMNF) is built; Sacks was an honorary medical advisor. The Institute honoured Sacks in 2000 with its first Music Has Power Award. The IMNF again bestowed a Music Has Power Award on him in 2006 to commemorate "his 40 years at Beth Abraham and honour his outstanding contributions in support of music therapy and the effect of music on the human brain and mind."

Sacks maintained a busy hospital-based practice in New York City. He accepted a very limited number of private patients, in spite of being in great demand for such consultations. He served on the boards of The Neurosciences Institute and the New York Botanical Garden.

=== Writing ===
In 1967 Sacks first began to write of his experiences with some of his neurological patients. He burned his first such book, Ward 23, during an episode of self-doubt. His books have been translated into over 25 languages. In addition, Sacks was a regular contributor to The New Yorker, the New York Review of Books, The New York Times, London Review of Books and numerous other medical, scientific and general publications. He was awarded the Lewis Thomas Prize for Writing about Science in 2001.

Sacks's work is featured in a "broader range of media than those of any other contemporary medical author" and in 1990, The New York Times wrote he "has become a kind of poet laureate of contemporary medicine".

Sacks considered his literary style to have grown out of the tradition of 19th-century "clinical anecdotes", a literary style that included detailed narrative case histories, which he termed novelistic. He also counted among his inspirations the case histories of the Russian neuropsychologist A. R. Luria, who became a close friend through correspondence from 1973 until Luria's death in 1977. After the publication of his first book Migraine in 1970, a review by his close friend W. H. Auden encouraged Sacks to adapt his writing style to "be metaphorical, be mythical, be whatever you need."

Sacks described his cases with a wealth of narrative detail, concentrating on the experiences of the patient (in the case of his A Leg to Stand On, the patient was himself). The patients he described were often able to adapt to their situation in different ways although their neurological conditions were usually considered incurable. His book Awakenings, upon which the 1990 feature film of the same name is based, describes his experiences using the new drug levodopa on post-encephalitic patients at the Beth Abraham Hospital, later Beth Abraham Center for Rehabilitation and Nursing, in New York. Awakenings was also the subject of the first documentary, made in 1974, for the British television series Discovery. Composer and friend of Sacks Tobias Picker composed a ballet inspired by Awakenings for the Rambert Dance Company, which was premiered by Rambert in Salford, UK in 2010; In 2022, Picker premiered an opera of Awakenings at Opera Theatre of Saint Louis.

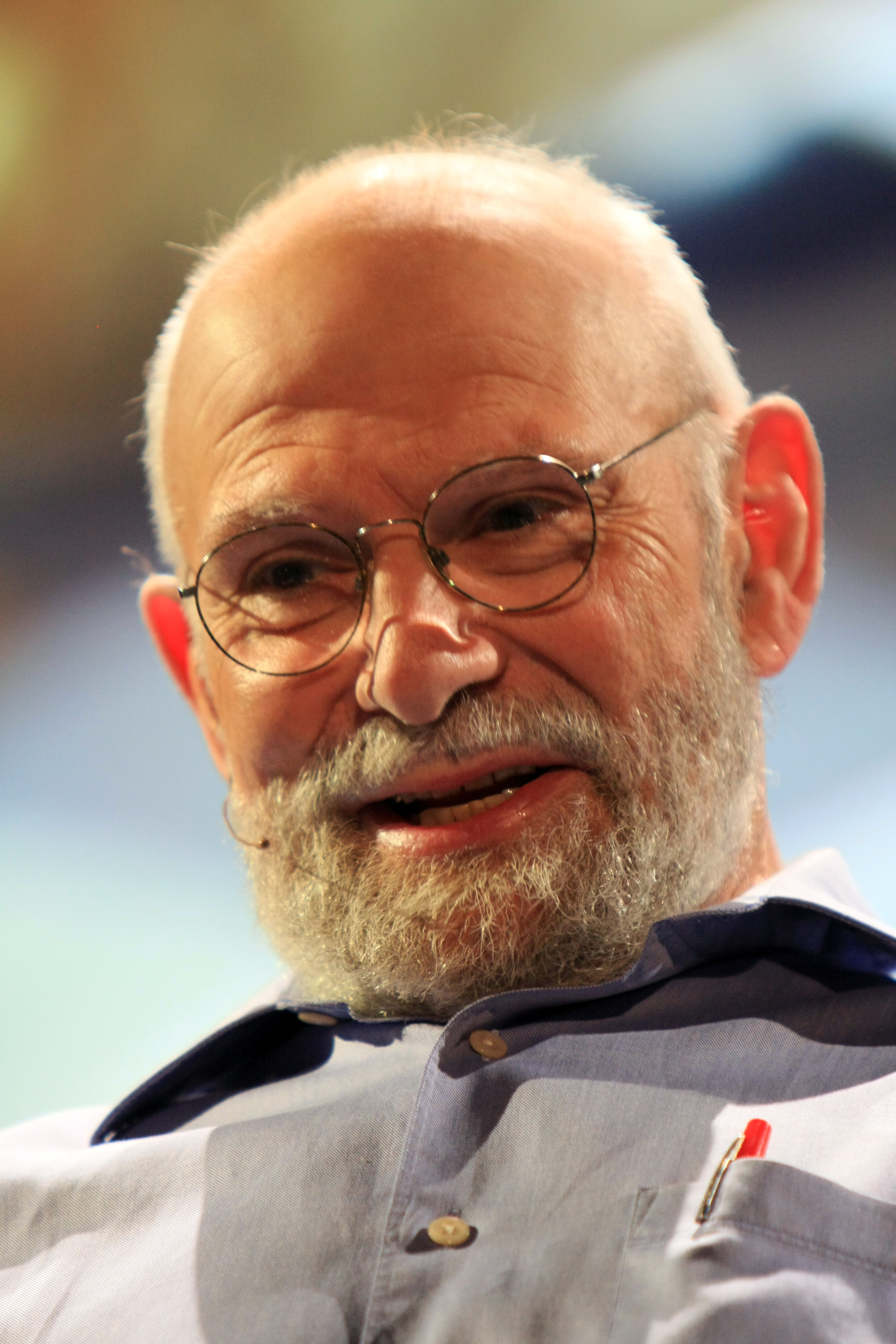
Sacks in 2009

In his memoir A Leg to Stand On he wrote about the consequences of a near-fatal accident he had at age 41 in 1974, a year after the publication of Awakenings, when he fell off a cliff and severely injured his left leg while mountaineering alone above Hardangerfjord, Norway.

In some of his other books, he describes cases of Tourette syndrome and various effects of Parkinson's disease. The title article of The Man Who Mistook His Wife for a Hat describes a man with visual agnosia and was the subject of a 1986 opera by Michael Nyman. The book was edited by Kate Edgar, who formed a long-lasting partnership with Sacks, with Sacks later calling her a "mother figure" and saying that he did his best work when she was with him, including Seeing Voices, Uncle Tungsten, Musicophilia, and Hallucinations.

The title article of his book An Anthropologist on Mars, which won a Polk Award for magazine reporting, is about Temple Grandin, an autistic professor. He writes in the book's preface that neurological conditions such as autism "can play a paradoxical role, by bringing out latent powers, developments, evolutions, forms of life that might never be seen, or even be imaginable, in their absence". Sacks's 1989 book Seeing Voices covers a variety of topics in deaf studies. The romantic drama film At First Sight (1999) was based on the essay "To See and Not See" in An Anthropologist on Mars. Sacks also has a small role in the film as a reporter.

In his book The Island of the Colorblind Sacks wrote about an island where many people have achromatopsia (total colourblindness, very low visual acuity and high photophobia). The second section of this book, titled Cycad Island, describes the Chamorro people of Guam, who have a high incidence of a neurodegenerative disease locally known as lytico-bodig disease (a combination of ALS, dementia and parkinsonism). Later, along with Paul Alan Cox, Sacks published papers suggesting a possible environmental cause for the disease, namely the toxin beta-methylamino L-alanine (BMAA) from the cycad nut accumulating by biomagnification in the flying fox bat.

In November 2012 Sacks's book Hallucinations was published. In it he examined why ordinary people can sometimes experience hallucinations and challenged the stigma associated with the word. He explained: "Hallucinations don't belong wholly to the insane. Much more commonly, they are linked to sensory deprivation, intoxication, illness or injury." He also considers the less well known Charles Bonnet syndrome, sometimes found in people who have lost their eyesight. The book was described by Entertainment Weekly as: "Elegant... An absorbing plunge into a mystery of the mind."

He also wrote The Mind's Eye, Oaxaca Journal and On the Move: A Life (his second autobiography).

Before his death in 2015 Sacks founded the Oliver Sacks Foundation, a non-profit organization established to increase understanding of the brain through using narrative non-fiction and case histories, with goals that include publishing some of Sacks's unpublished writings, and making his vast amount of unpublished writings available for scholarly study. The first posthumous book of Sacks's writings, River of Consciousness, an anthology of his essays, was published in October 2017. Most of the essays had been previously published in various periodicals or in science-essay-anthology books, but were no longer readily obtainable. Sacks specified the order of his essays in River of Consciousness prior to his death. Some of the essays focus on repressed memories and other tricks the mind plays on itself. This was followed by a collection of some of his letters. Sacks was a prolific handwritten-letter correspondent, and never communicated by e-mail.

== Criticism and falsifications ==
Sacks sometimes faced criticism in the medical and disability studies communities. Arthur K. Shapiro, for instance, an expert on Tourette syndrome, said Sacks's work was "idiosyncratic" and relied too much on anecdotal evidence in his writings. Researcher Makoto Yamaguchi thought Sacks's mathematical explanations, in his study of the numerically gifted savant twins (in The Man Who Mistook His Wife for a Hat), were irrelevant, and questioned Sacks's methods.

Although Sacks has been characterised as a "compassionate" writer and doctor, others have felt that he exploited his subjects. Sacks was called "the man who mistook his patients for a literary career" by British academic and disability rights activist Tom Shakespeare, and one critic called his work "a high-brow freak show". Sacks responded, "I would hope that a reading of what I write shows respect and appreciation, not any wish to expose or exhibit for the thrill ... but it's a delicate business."

While researching for a 2025 article for The New Yorker, journalist Rachel Aviv was given access to Sacks's private journals and letters by the Oliver Sacks Foundation. Aviv found that Sacks described aspects of his books as "pure fabrications" and "falsifications", and that he considered his case studies as self-expression or "a sort of autobiography". In a private letter to his brother he described The Man Who Mistook His Wife for a Hat as a book of "fairy tales" and wrote: "Guilt has been much greater since 'Hat' because of (among other things) My lies, falsification". Pria Anand, writing in Nautilus, compared Sacks's "confabulations" to the temptation of medical professionals to construct life stories, but found that his moral failures were no less upsetting for being familiar. Writing in Psychiatric Times, H. Steven Moffic described Sacks as an author of "historical fiction".

The wife of "The Man Who Mistook His Wife for a Hat" disagreed with how her husband had been presented.

== Honours ==
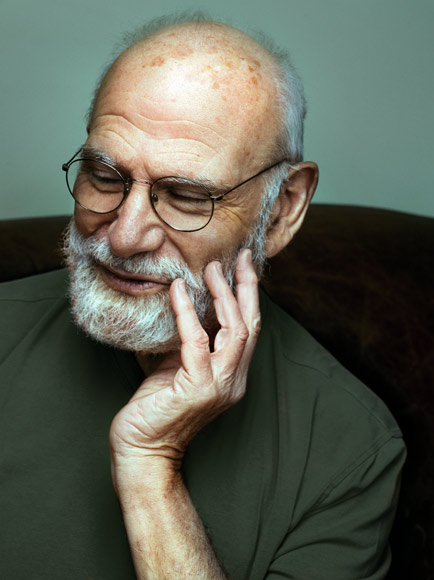
Sacks in 2013

In 1996, Sacks became a member of the American Academy of Arts and Letters (Literature). He was named a Fellow of the New York Academy of Sciences in 1999. Also in 1999, he became an Honorary Fellow at the Queen's College, Oxford.

In 2000, Sacks received the Golden Plate Award of the American Academy of Achievement. In 2002, he became Fellow of the American Academy of Arts and Sciences (Class IV—Humanities and Arts, Section 4—Literature) and he was awarded the 2001 Lewis Thomas Prize by Rockefeller University. Sacks was also a Fellow of the Royal College of Physicians (FRCP).

Sacks was awarded honorary doctorates from Georgetown University (1990), College of Staten Island (1991), Tufts University (1991), New York Medical College (1991), Medical College of Pennsylvania (1992), Bard College (1992), Queen's University at Kingston (2001), Gallaudet University (2005), Pontificia Universidad Católica del Perú (2006) and Cold Spring Harbor Laboratory (2008).

Oxford University awarded him an honorary Doctor of Civil Law degree in June 2005.

Sacks received the position "Columbia Artist" from Columbia University in 2007, a post that was created specifically for him and that gave him unconstrained access to the university, regardless of department or discipline.

On 26 November 2008, Sacks was appointed Commander of the Order of the British Empire (CBE), for services to medicine, in the Queen's Birthday Honours.

The minor planet 84928 Oliversacks, discovered in 2003, was named in his honour.

In February 2010, Sacks was named as one of the Freedom From Religion Foundation's Honorary Board of distinguished achievers. He described himself as "an old Jewish atheist", a phrase he borrowed from his friend Jonathan Miller.

== Personal life ==
Sacks never married and lived alone for most of his life. He declined to share personal details until late in his life. He addressed his homosexuality for the first time in his 2015 autobiography On the Move: A Life. Celibate for about 35 years since his forties, in 2008 he began a friendship with writer and New York Times contributor Bill Hayes. Their friendship slowly evolved into a committed long-term partnership that lasted until Sacks's death; Hayes wrote about it in the 2017 memoir Insomniac City: New York, Oliver, and Me.

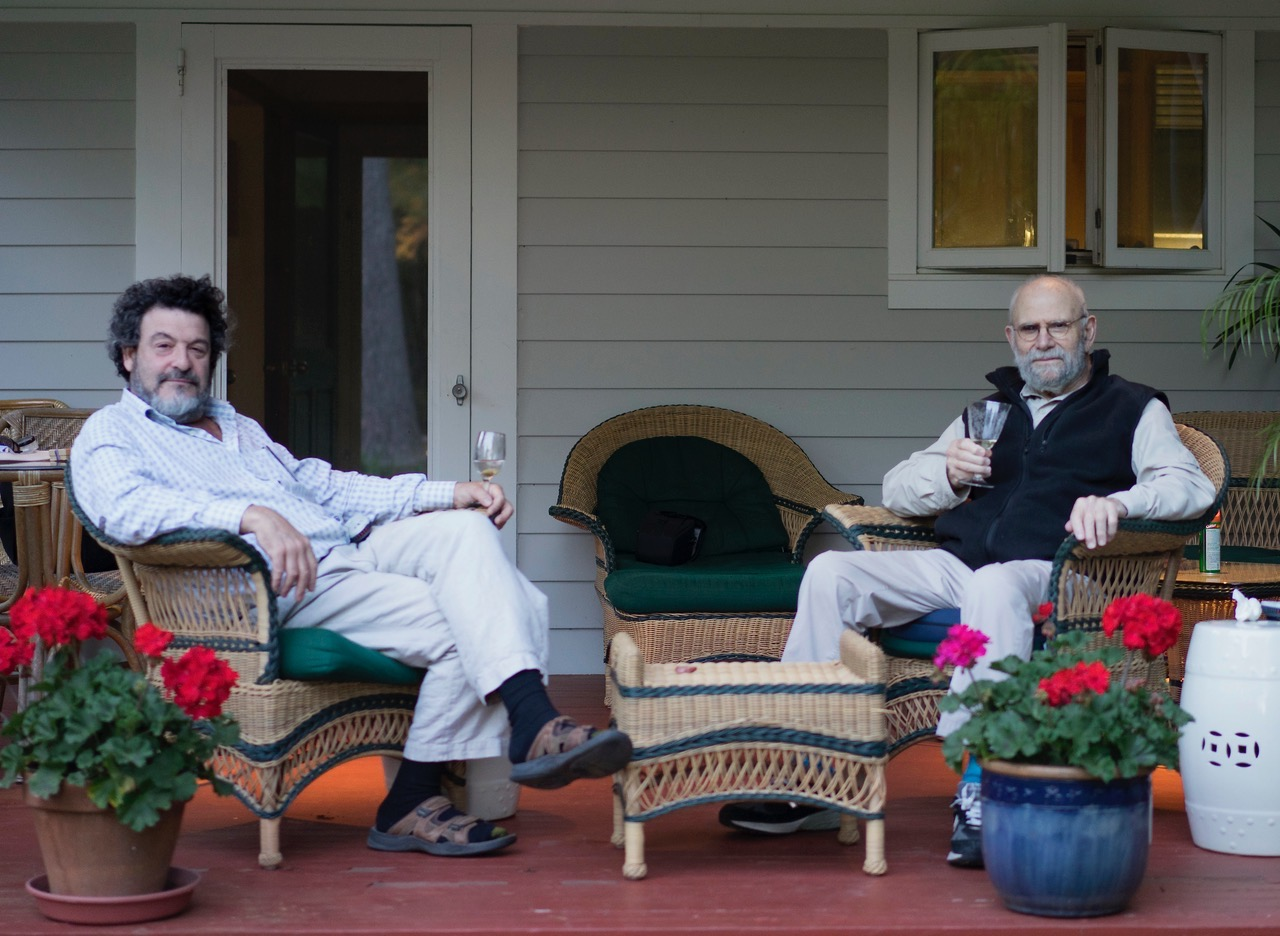
Sacks (right) with Tobias Picker, May 2015

In Lawrence Weschler's biography, And How Are You, Dr. Sacks?, Sacks is described by a colleague as "deeply eccentric". A friend from his days as a medical resident mentions Sacks's need to violate taboos, like drinking blood mixed with milk, and how he frequently took drugs like LSD and speed in the early 1960s. Sacks himself shared personal information about how he got his first orgasm spontaneously while floating in a swimming pool, and later when he was giving a man a massage. He also admits having "erotic fantasies of all sorts" in a natural history museum he visited often in his youth, many of them about animals, like hippos in the mud. In the late 1960s he attempted to "sublimate" his closeted energies into his work; he would quell nighttime erections by submersion in orange jello, and his writing was prolific, with over a million words a year.

Sacks noted in a 2001 interview that severe shyness, which he described as "a disease", had been a lifelong impediment to his personal interactions. He believed his shyness stemmed from his prosopagnosia, popularly known as "face blindness", a condition that he studied in some of his patients, including the titular man from his work The Man Who Mistook His Wife for a Hat. This neurological disability of his, whose severity and whose impact on his life Sacks did not fully grasp until he reached middle age, even sometimes prevented him from recognising his own reflection in mirrors.

Sacks swam almost daily for most of his life, beginning when his swimming-champion father started him swimming as an infant. He became well-known for open water swimming when he lived in the City Island section of the Bronx, as he routinely swam around the island or swam vast distances away from the island and back.

He was also an avid powerlifter.

Sacks was a cousin of the Nobel Memorial Economics laureate Robert Aumann.

=== Illness ===
Sacks underwent radiation therapy in 2006 for a uveal melanoma in his right eye. He discussed his loss of stereoscopic vision caused by the treatment, which eventually resulted in right-eye blindness, in an article and later in his book The Mind's Eye.

In January 2015, metastases from the ocular tumour were discovered in his liver. Sacks announced this development in a February 2015 New York Times op-ed piece and estimated his remaining time in "months". He expressed his intent to "live in the richest, deepest, most productive way I can". He added: "I want and hope in the time that remains to deepen my friendships, to say farewell to those I love, to write more, to travel if I have the strength, to achieve new levels of understanding and insight."

== Death and legacy ==
Sacks died from cancer on 30 August 2015, at his home in Manhattan at the age of 82, surrounded by his closest friends.

In his obituary in The New York Times he was described as "a man of contradictions: candid and guarded, gregarious and solitary, clinical and compassionate, scientific and poetic, British and almost American. 'In 1961, I declared my intention to become a United States citizen, which may have been a genuine intention, but I never got round to it,' he told The Guardian in 2005."

The 2019 documentary Oliver Sacks: His Own Life, by Ric Burns, called Sacks "the most famous neurologist," and noted that during his lifetime, neurology resident applicants often said that they had chosen neurology after reading Sacks's works. The film includes documents from Sacks's archive.

In 2019, Alfred A. Knopf signed a contract with the historian and biographer Laura J. Snyder to write a biography of Sacks based on exclusive access to his archive.

In 2024, the New York Public Library announced that it had acquired Sacks's archive, including 35,000 letters, 7,000 photographs, manuscripts of his books, and journals and notebooks. In 2024, Alfred A. Knopf published a collection of his letters, edited by Kate Edgar.

== Published works ==
- Migraine (1970) ISBN 978-0-375-70406-2
- Awakenings (1973) ISBN 0-375-70405-1
- A Leg to Stand On (1984) ISBN 978-0-684-85395-6
- The Man Who Mistook His Wife for a Hat (1985) ISBN 0-671-55471-9
- Seeing Voices: A Journey Into the World of the Deaf (1989) ISBN 0-520-06083-0
- An Anthropologist on Mars (1995) ISBN 0-679-43785-1
- The Island of the Colorblind (1997) ISBN 978-0-676-97035-7
- Uncle Tungsten: Memories of a Chemical Boyhood (2001) (first autobiography) ISBN 0-375-40448-1
- Oaxaca Journal (2002) ISBN 978-0-307-94744-4 (travelogue of Sacks's ten-day trip with the American Fern Society to Oaxaca, Mexico, 2000)
- Musicophilia: Tales of Music and the Brain (2007) ISBN 978-1-4000-4081-0
- The Mind's Eye (2010) ISBN 978-0-307-27208-9
- Hallucinations (2012) ISBN 978-0-307-95724-5
- On the Move: A Life (2015) (second autobiography) ISBN 978-0-385-35254-3
- Gratitude (2015) (published posthumously) ISBN 978-0451492937
- NeuroTribes: The Legacy of Autism and the Future of Neurodiversity by Steve Silberman (2015) ISBN 978-1-583-33467-6 (foreword by Sacks)
- Oliver Sacks: The Last Interview and Other Conversations (2016) ISBN 978-1612195773 (a collection of interviews)
- The River of Consciousness (2017) ISBN 978-0-345-80899-8
- Everything in Its Place: First Loves and Last Tales (2019) ISBN 978-0451492890
- Letters (2024) ISBN 978-0451492913

=== Articles ===
- "The Machine Stops: the neurologist on steam engines, smart phones, and fearing the future". Personal History. The New Yorker. 94 (48): 28–29. 11 February 2019.
- "Telling : the intimate decisions of dementia care". A Neurologist's Notebook. The New Yorker. 95 (2): 26–27. 4 March 2019.
