= World War I in popular culture =

World War I depicted in popular culture

"Lord Kitchener Wants You" has become an iconic image associated with the war.

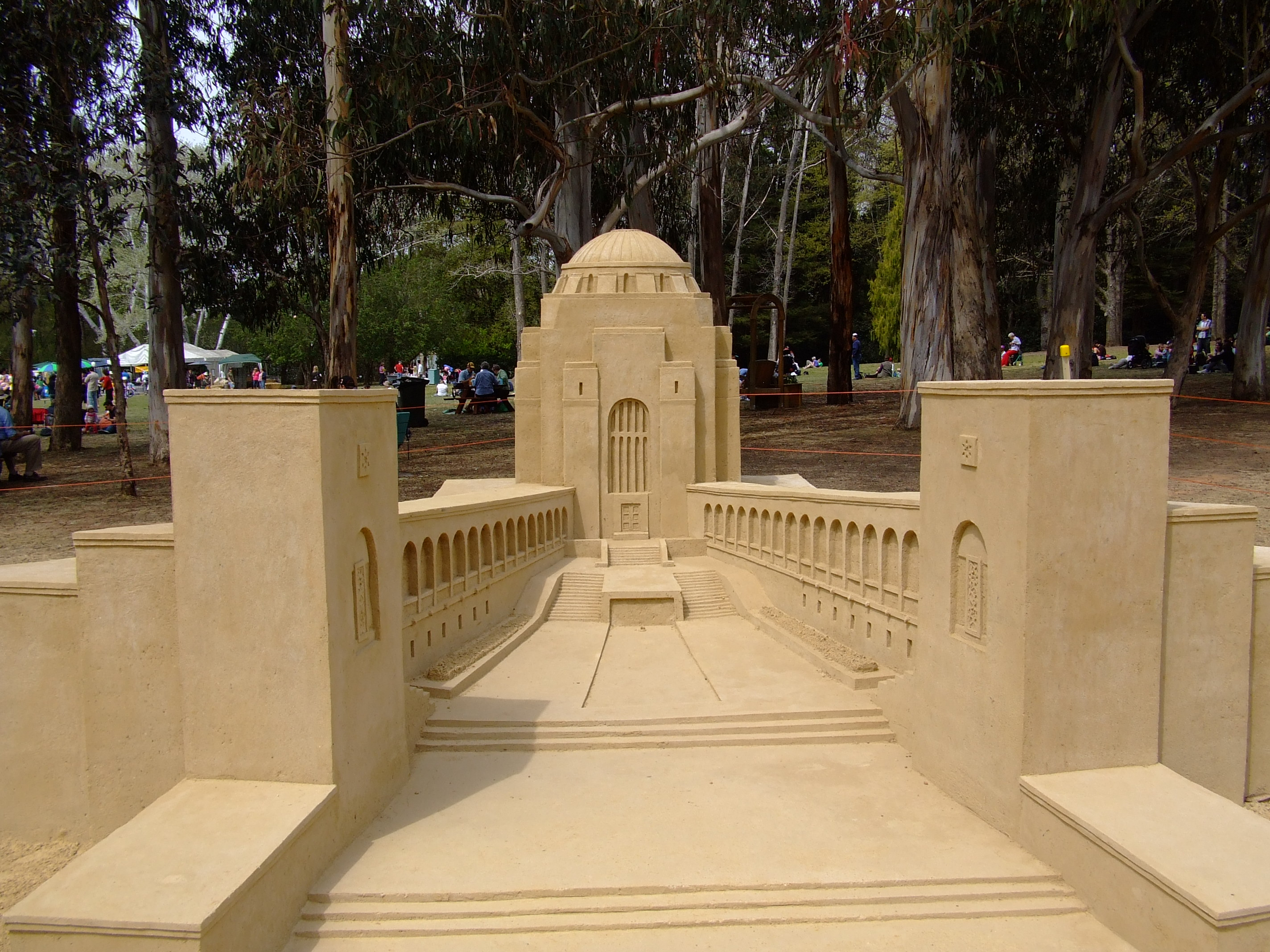
Contemporary sand sculpture rendition of the iconic Australian War Memorial in Canberra, Australia.

The First World War, which was fought between 1914 and 1918, had an immediate impact on popular culture. Over a hundred years since the war ended, the war has resulted in many artistic and cultural works from all sides and nations that participated in the war. This included artworks, books, poems, films, television, music, and, more recently, video games. Many of these pieces were created by soldiers who took part in the war.

== Art ==
The years of warfare were the backdrop for art, which is now preserved and displayed in such institutions as the Imperial War Museum in London, the Canadian War Museum in Ottawa, and the Australian War Memorial in Canberra. Official war artists were commissioned by the British Ministry of Information and the authorities of other countries.

After 1914, avant-garde artists began to consider and investigate many things that had once seemed unimaginable. As Marc Chagall later remarked, "The war was another plastic work that totally absorbed us, which reformed our forms, destroyed the lines, and gave a new look to the universe." In this same period, academic and realist artists continued to produce new work. Traditional artists and their artwork developed side by side with the shock of the new as culture reinvented itself in relationships with new technologies.

Some artists responded positively to the changes wrought by war. C. R. W. Nevinson, associated with the Futurists, wrote that "This war will be a violent incentive to Futurism, for we believe there is no beauty except in strife, and no masterpiece without aggressiveness." His fellow artist Walter Sickert wrote that Nevinson's painting La Mitrailleuse (now in the Tate collection) 'will probably remain the most authoritative and concentrated utterance on the war in the history of painting.'

Pacifist artists also responded to the war in powerful ways: Mark Gertler's major painting, Merry-Go-Round, was created in the midst of the war years and was described by D. H. Lawrence as "the best modern picture I have seen" and depicts the war as a futile and mechanistic nightmare.

The commissions related to the official war artists programmes insisted on the recording of scenes of war. This undermined confidence in progressive styles as commissioned artists conformed to official requirements. The inhumanity of destruction across Europe also led artists to question whether their own campaigns of destruction against tradition had not, in fact, also been inhuman. These tendencies encouraged many artists to "return to order" stylistically.

The Cubist vocabulary itself was adapted and modified by the Royal Navy during "the Great War." The Cubists aimed to revolutionize painting — and reinvented the art of camouflage on the way.

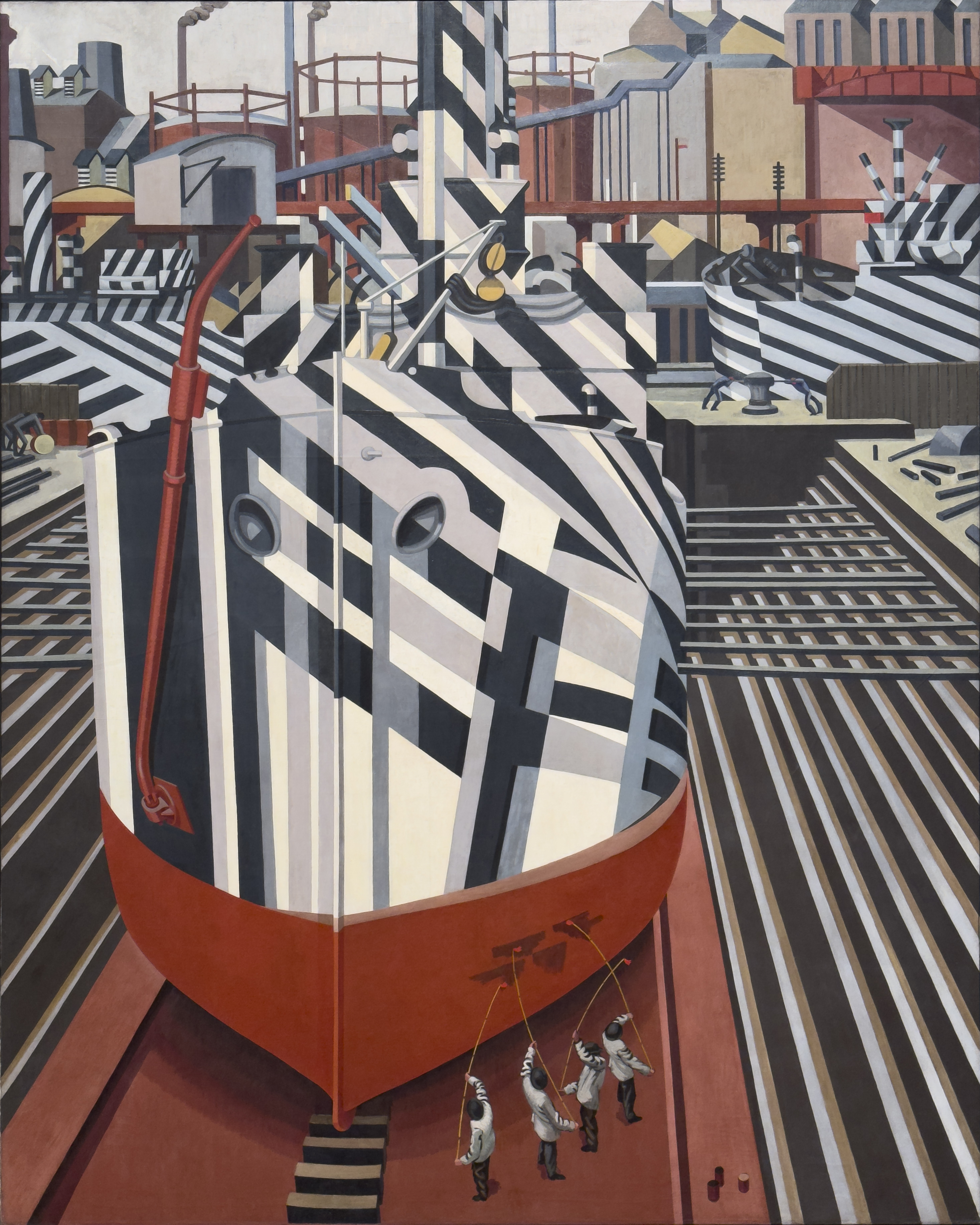
Painting of Dazzle-ships in Drydock at Liverpool, Edward Wadsworth, 1919

British marine painter Norman Wilkinson invented the concept of "dazzle painting" -— a way of using stripes and disrupted lines to confuse the enemy about the speed and dimensions of a ship. Wilkinson, then a lieutenant commander on Royal Navy patrol duty, implemented the precursor of "dazzle" on SS Industry; and in August 1917 HMS Alsatian became the first Navy ship to be painted with a dazzle pattern. Solomon J. Solomon advised the British Army on camouflage. In December 1916 he established a camouflage school in Hyde Park In 1920, he published a book on the subject, Strategic Camouflage. Alan Beeton advanced the science of camouflage.

An early influence of the War on artists in the United Kingdom was the recruiting campaign of 1914–1915. Around a hundred posters were commissioned from artists by the Parliamentary Recruiting Committee, of which two and a half million copies were distributed across the country. Private companies also sponsored recruitment posters: Remember Belgium, by the Belgian-born Frank Brangwyn and The Only Road for an Englishman by Gerald Spencer Pryse were two notable examples produced on behalf of the London Electric Railways. Although Brangwyn produced over 80 poster designs during the War, he was not an official war artist. His grim poster of a Tommy bayoneting an enemy soldier (“Put Strength in the Final Blow: Buy War Bonds”) caused deep offence in both Britain and Germany. The Kaiser himself is said to have put a price on Brangwyn's head after seeing the image.

Brangwyn states in 1917 that Will Dyson's cartoons were "an international asset to this present war." His exhibition of "War Satires" in 1915 was followed by his being appointed an Australian official war artist.

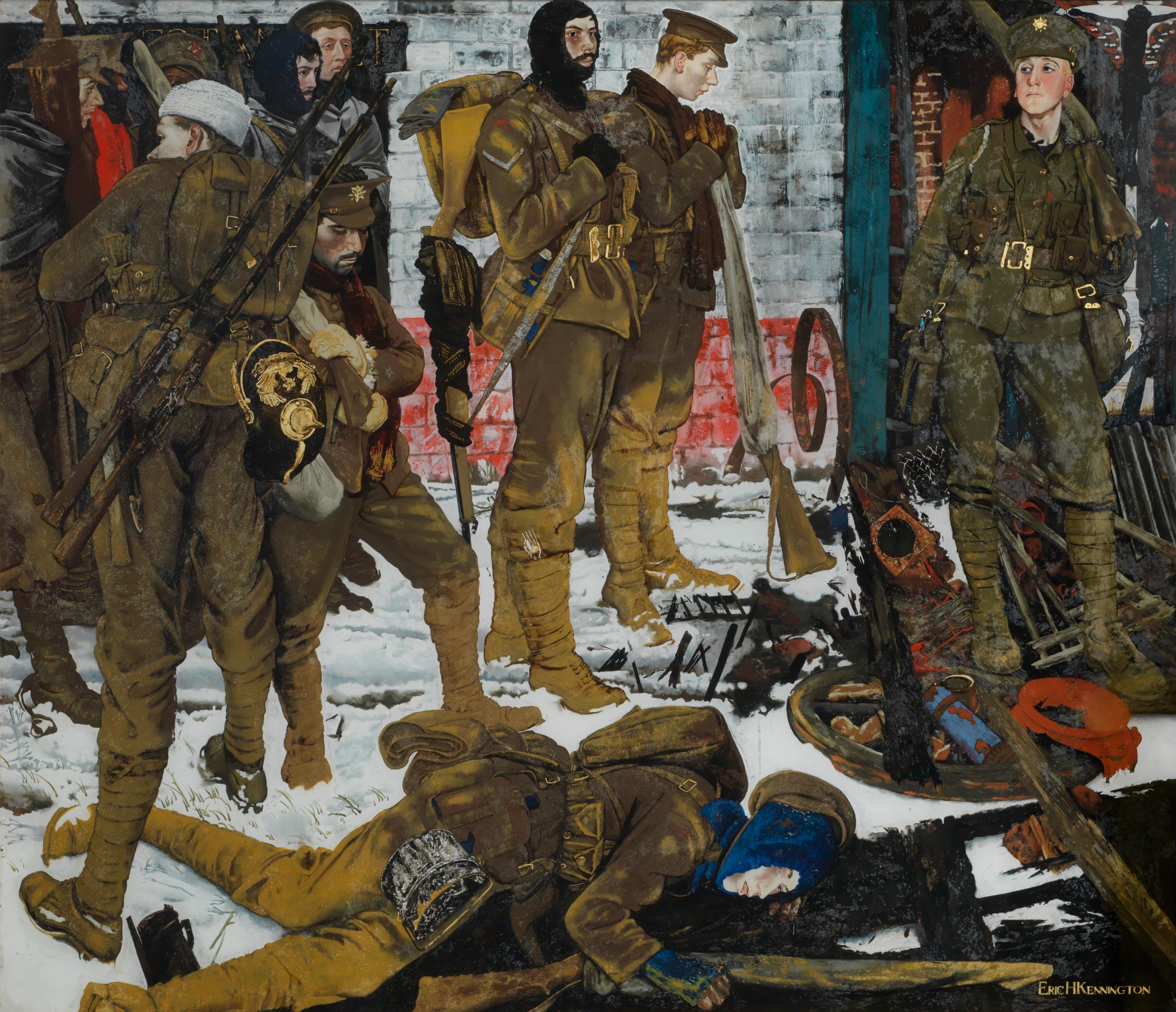
The Kensingtons at Laventie,(1915), Eric Kennington

The Royal Academy Summer Exhibition of 1915 was noted for the paucity and general poor quality of paintings on war themes, but The Fighting-Line from Ypres to the Sea by W. L. Wyllie was noted for its bold experimentation in showing a bird's-eye view of war from an aeroplane. George Clausen's symbolist allegory Renaissance was the most memorable painting of that 1915 exhibition, contrasting ruins and oppression with dignity and optimism. When exhibited in the spring of 1916, Eric Kennington's portrayal of exhausted soldiers The Kensingtons at Laventie caused a sensation. Painted in reverse on glass, the painting was widely praised for its technical virtuosity, iconic colour scheme, and its ‘stately presentation of human endurance, of the quiet heroism of the rank and file’. Kennington returned to the front in 1917 as an official war artist.

The general failure of academic painting, in the form of the Royal Academy, to respond adequately to the challenges of representing the War was made clear by reaction to the 1916 Summer Exhibition. Although popular taste acclaimed Richard Jack's sentimental Return to the Front: Victoria Railway Station, 1916, the academicians and their followers were stuck in the imagery of past battle pictures of the Napoleonic and Crimean eras. Arrangements of soldiers, officers waving swords, and cavalrymen swaggering seemed outdated to those at home, and risible to those with experience of the front. A wounded New Zealander standing in front of a painting of a cavalry charge commented that "one man with a machine-gun would wipe all that lot out."

Charles Masterman, head of the British War Propaganda Bureau, acting on the advice of William Rothenstein, appointed Muirhead Bone as Britain's first official war artist in May 1916. In April 1917, James McBey was appointed official artist for Egypt and Palestine, and William Orpen was sent to France. Orpen's work was criticised for superficiality in the pursuit of perfectionism: "in the tremendous fun of painting he altogether forgot the ghastliness of war".

The most popular painting in the Royal Academy Exhibition of 1917 was Frank O. Salisbury's Boy 1st Class John Travers Cornwell V.C. depicting a youthful act of heroism. But of more artistic importance in 1917 was the establishment on 5 March of the Imperial War Museum and the foundation during the summer of the Canadian War Memorials Fund by Lord Beaverbrook and Lord Rothermere and significant work by Australian war artists.

David Bomberg's experiences of mechanized slaughter and the death of his brother in the trenches - as well as those of his friend Isaac Rosenberg and his supporter T. E. Hulme - permanently destroyed his faith in the aesthetics of the machine age. This can be seen most clearly in his commission for the Canadian War Memorials Fund, Sappers at Work (1918–1919): his first version of the painting was dismissed as a "futurist abortion" and was replaced by a second far more representational version. Percy Delf Smith created realistic depictions of his time in the trenches and more fantastical depictions based on medieval dance of death imagery.

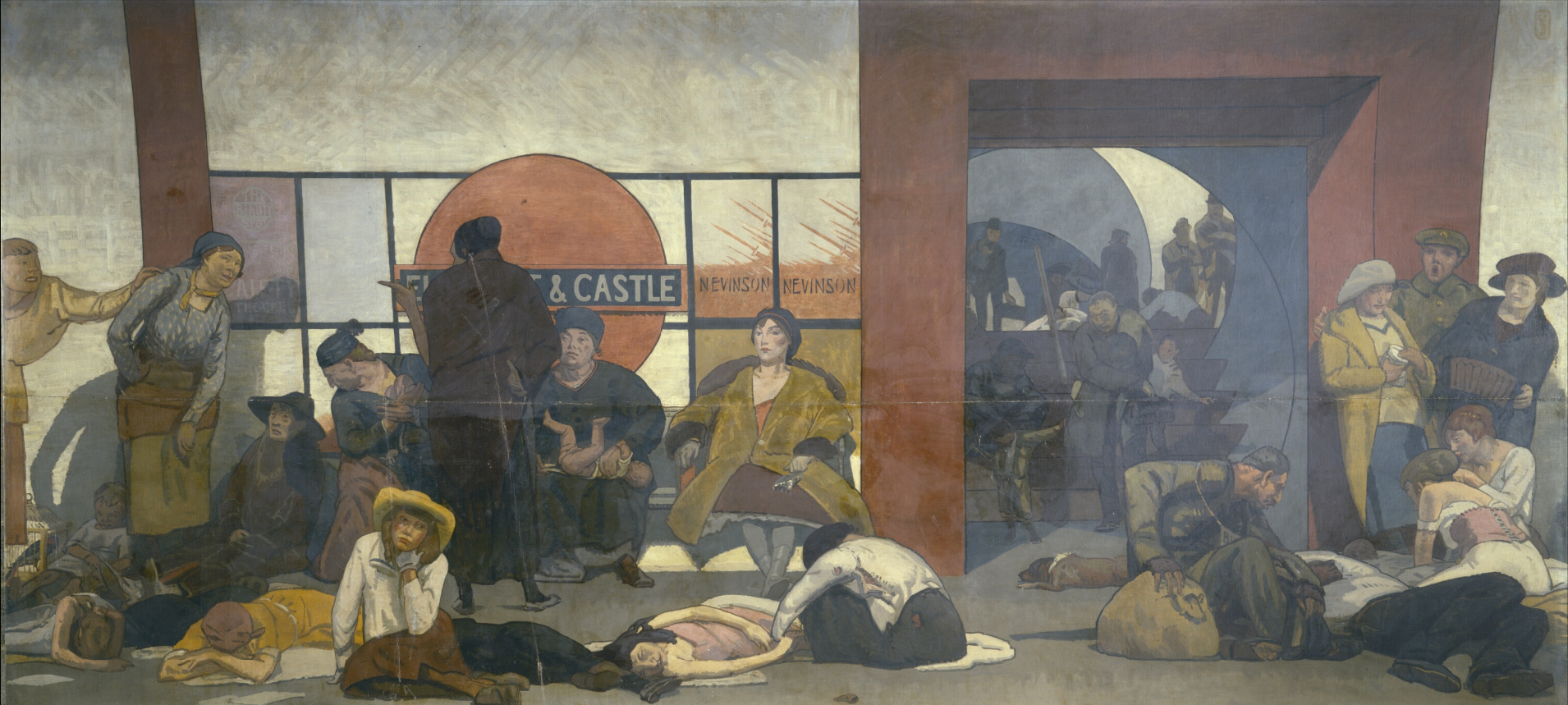
The Underworld, Walter Bayes, 1918

At the 1918 Royal Academy exhibition, Walter Bayes's monumental canvas The Underworld depicted figures sheltering in a London Underground station during an air raid. Its sprawling alien figures predate Henry Moore's studies of sheltering figures in the Tube during the Blitz of World War II.

See also the Comité des Étudiants Américains de l'École des Beaux-Arts Paris.

=== Painting ===
Walter Richard Sickert's The Integrity of Belgium, painted in October 1914, was, when exhibited in Burlington House in January 1915 at an exhibition in aid of the Red Cross, recognised as the first oil painting exhibited of a battle incident in the Great War.

==== John Singer Sargent ====
John Singer Sargent's Gassed presents a classical frieze of soldiers being led from the battlefield - alive, but changed forever by individual encounters with deadly hazard in war.

Among the great artists who tried to capture an essential element of war in painting was the Society portraitist John Singer Sargent. In his large painting Gassed and in many watercolors, Sargent depicted scenes from the Great War.

==== Wyndham Lewis ====
British painter Wyndham Lewis was appointed as an official war artist for both the Canadian and British governments, beginning work in December 1917 after Lewis participated in the Third Battle of Ypres. For the Canadians, he painted A Canadian Gun-Pit (1918, National Gallery of Canada, Ottawa) from sketches made on Vimy Ridge. For the British, he painted one of his best-known works, A Battery Shelled (1919, Imperial War Museum)(see ), drawing on his own experience in charge of a 6-inch howitzer at Ypres. Lewis exhibited his war drawings and some other paintings of the war in an exhibition, "Guns", in 1918.

==== Alfred Munnings ====
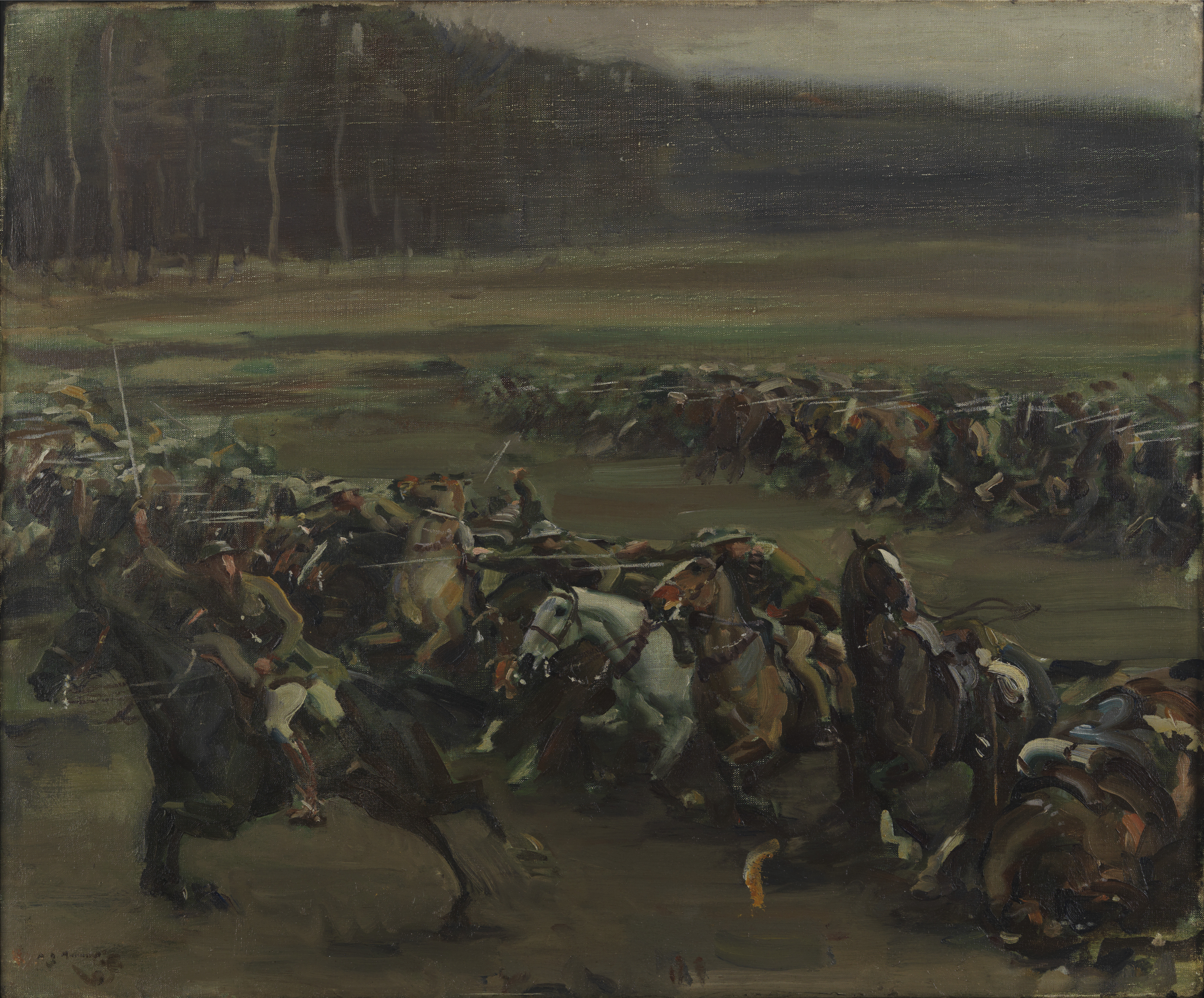
Charge of Flowerdew's Squadron

An unlikely war artist was Sir Alfred Munnings, who is best known as a painter of purebred racehorses; but he turned his painter's skills to the task of capturing images of the Canadian Cavalry Brigade in the war. His mounted portrait of General Jack Seely (later Lord Mottistone) on his charger Warrior achieved acclaim. Forty-five of his canvasses were exhibited at the "Canadian War Records Exhibition" at the Royal Academy, including Charge of Flowerdew's Squadron at Moreuil Wood in March 1918. Lieutenant Gordon Flowerdew of Lord Strathcona's Horse cavalry was awarded the Victoria Cross for leading the attack.

Less well known are paintings which feature teams of workhorses in the staging areas behind the front lines with the Canadian Forestry Corps. The artist later recalled these days in his autobiography:

My next move was unexpected and unlooked-for. Amongst the officers who came to have a look, as the news spread that my pictures were to be seen on the walls of ... [headquarters] ..., there were two colonels, both in the Canadian Forestry Corps ... persuading me that I must go with them and see the companies of Canadian Forestry who were then working in the many beautiful forests of France ....
The forest of Conche in Normandy was my first experience of painting with the Forestry. Then came the area of the forest of Dreux, one of the finest in France, taking up fifteen square miles of ground... Each company had a hundred and twenty horses, all half-bred Percheron types, mostly blacks and greys. A rivalry existed between the companies as to which had the best-conditioned teams. I painted pictures of these teams at work, pictures of men axing, sawing down trees...

==== John Nash ====
Over The Top, 1918, oil on canvas, by John Nash, Imperial War Museum.

British painter John Nash believed that "the artist's main business is to train his eye to see, then to probe, and then to train his hand to work in sympathy with his eye."

The artist's most celebrated war painting is Over the Top (oil on canvas, 79.4 x 107.3 cm), now hanging in the Imperial War Museum in London. In this painting, the artist presents an image of the 30 December 1917 Welsh Ridge counter-attack, during which the 1st Battalion Artists Rifles (28th London Regiment) left their trenches and pushed towards Marcoing near Cambrai. Of the eighty men, sixty-eight were killed or wounded during the first few minutes.

Nash himself was one of the twelve spared by the machine gun fire in the charge depicted in the painting. He created this artwork three months later. The war artist crafted a chilling, harsh, vivid image. The painting offers a narrative of men moving forward despite the likelihood of not coming back alive:

As soon as our line, set on its jolting way, emerged, I felt that two men close by had been hit, two shadows fell to the ground and rolled under our feet, one with a high-pitched scream and the other in silence like an ox. Another disappeared with a movement like a madman, as if he had been carried away. Instinctively, we closed ranks and pushed each other forward, always forward, and the wound in our midst closed itself. The warrant officer stopped and raised his sword, dropped it, fell to his knees, his kneeling body falling backwards in jerks, his helmet fell on his heels and he remained there, his head uncovered, looking up to the sky. The line has promptly split to avoid breaking this immobility. But we couldn't see the lieutenant any more. No more superiors, then... A moment's hesitation held back the human wave which had reached the beginning of the plateau. The hoarse sound of air passing through our lungs could be heard over the stamping of feet. Forward! cried a soldier. So we all marched forward, moving faster and faster in our race towards the abyss.

==== Arthur Streeton ====
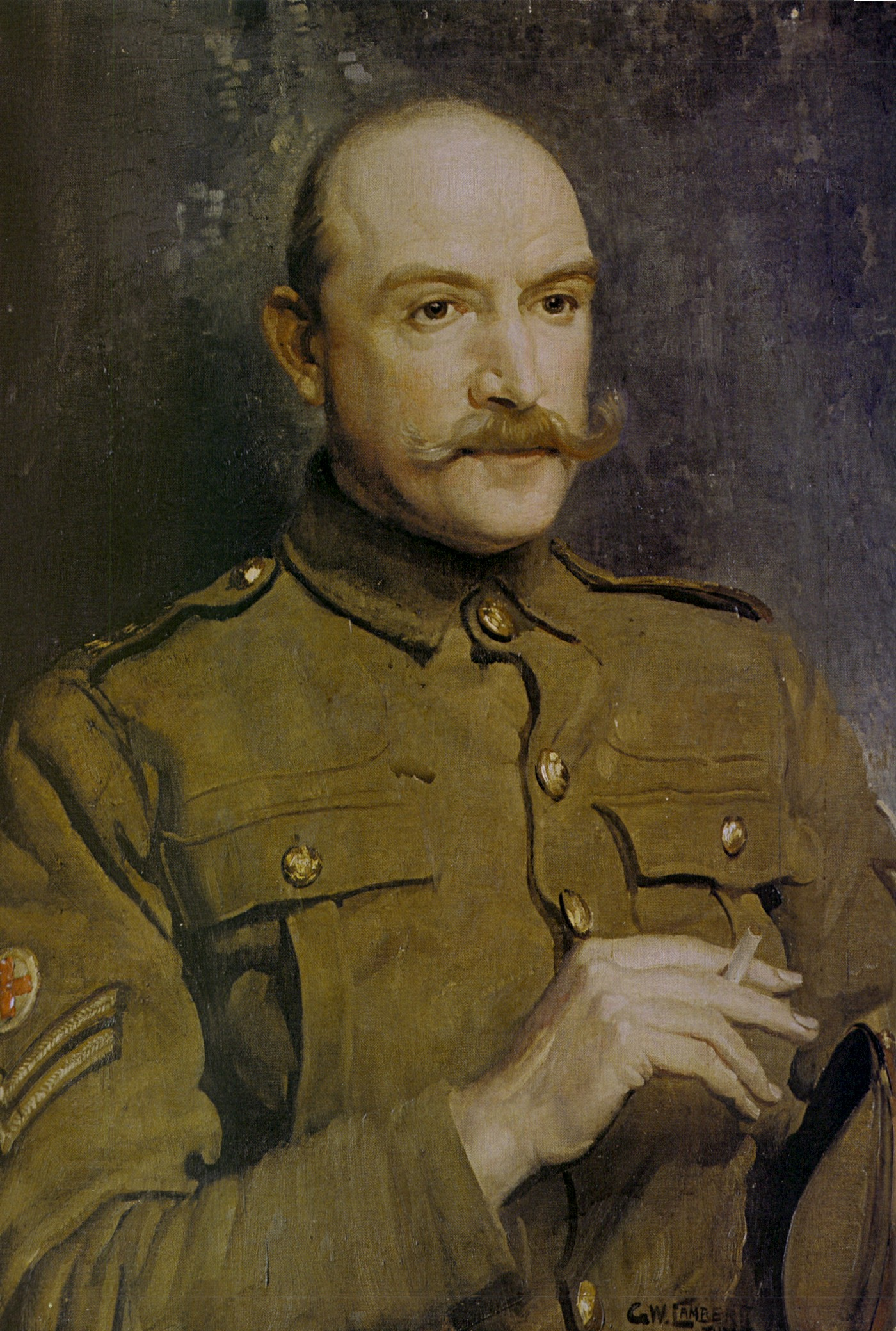
Portrait of Arthur Streeton (1917) by George Lambert.

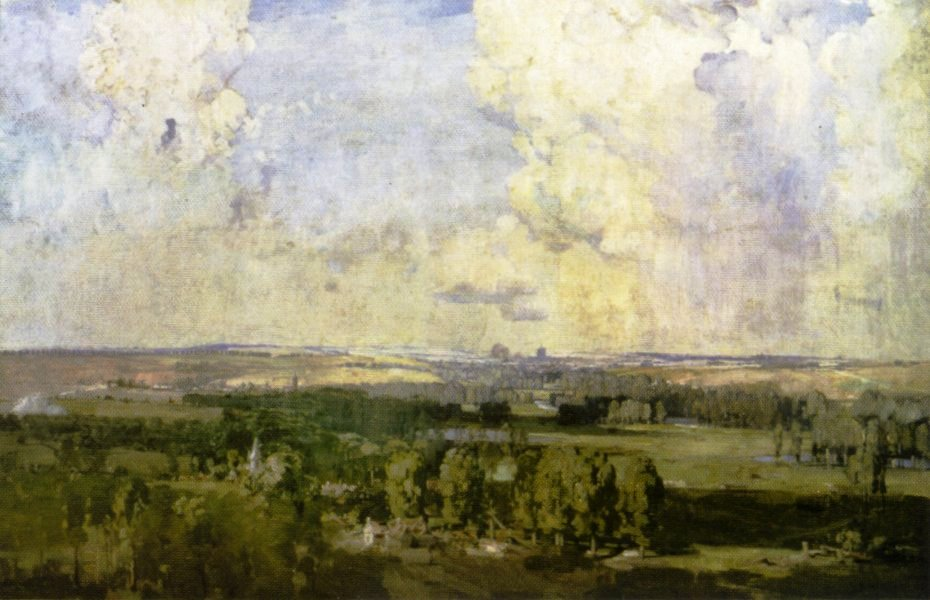
Amiens, the key to the west by Arthur Streeton, 1918.

Australian painter Arthur Streeton was an Australian Official War Artist with the Australian Imperial Force, holding the rank of lieutenant. He served in France attached to the 2nd Division.

Streeton brought something of the antipodes Heidelberg school sensibility to his paintings of an ANZAC battlefield in France.

Streeton's most famous war painting, Amiens the key of the west shows the Amiens countryside with dirty plumes of battlefield smoke staining the horizon, which becomes a subtle image of war.

As a war artist, Streeton continued to deal in landscapes, and his works have been criticised for failing to concentrate on the fighting soldiers.

Streeton aimed to produce "military still life", capturing the everyday moments of the war. Streeton observed that, "True pictures of battlefields are very quiet-looking things. There's nothing much to be seen, everybody and thing is hidden and camouflaged."

=== Sculpture ===
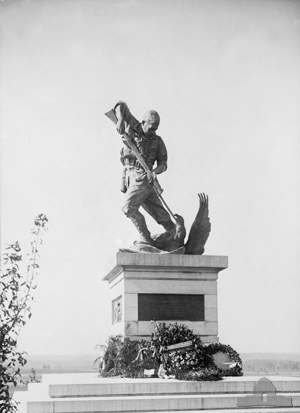
The Mont St. Quentin memorial (c. 1925) commemorates the men of the Australian Imperial Forces (AIF) and their contribution in the battle which was fought in this area.

A sculpture by Charles Web Gilbert was designed as a part of the Mont St. Quentin Memorial, which was dedicated in the mid-1920s at Mont St. Quentin, France. The original memorial to the men of the 2nd Australian Division features a heroic bronze statue of an Australian soldier bayoneting a German eagle.

A bronze plaque on the pedestal of the monument reads: 'To the officers, non-commissioned officers and men of the 2nd Australian Division who fought in France and Belgium in the Great War 1916, 1917, 1918.'

The statue on top of the memorial and the bas-reliefs on its sides, which were sculpted respectively by Lieutenant Charles Web Gilbert and May Butler-George, were removed by the occupying German Army in 1940. They were later replaced with a new statue and new reliefs.

=== Remembrance ===
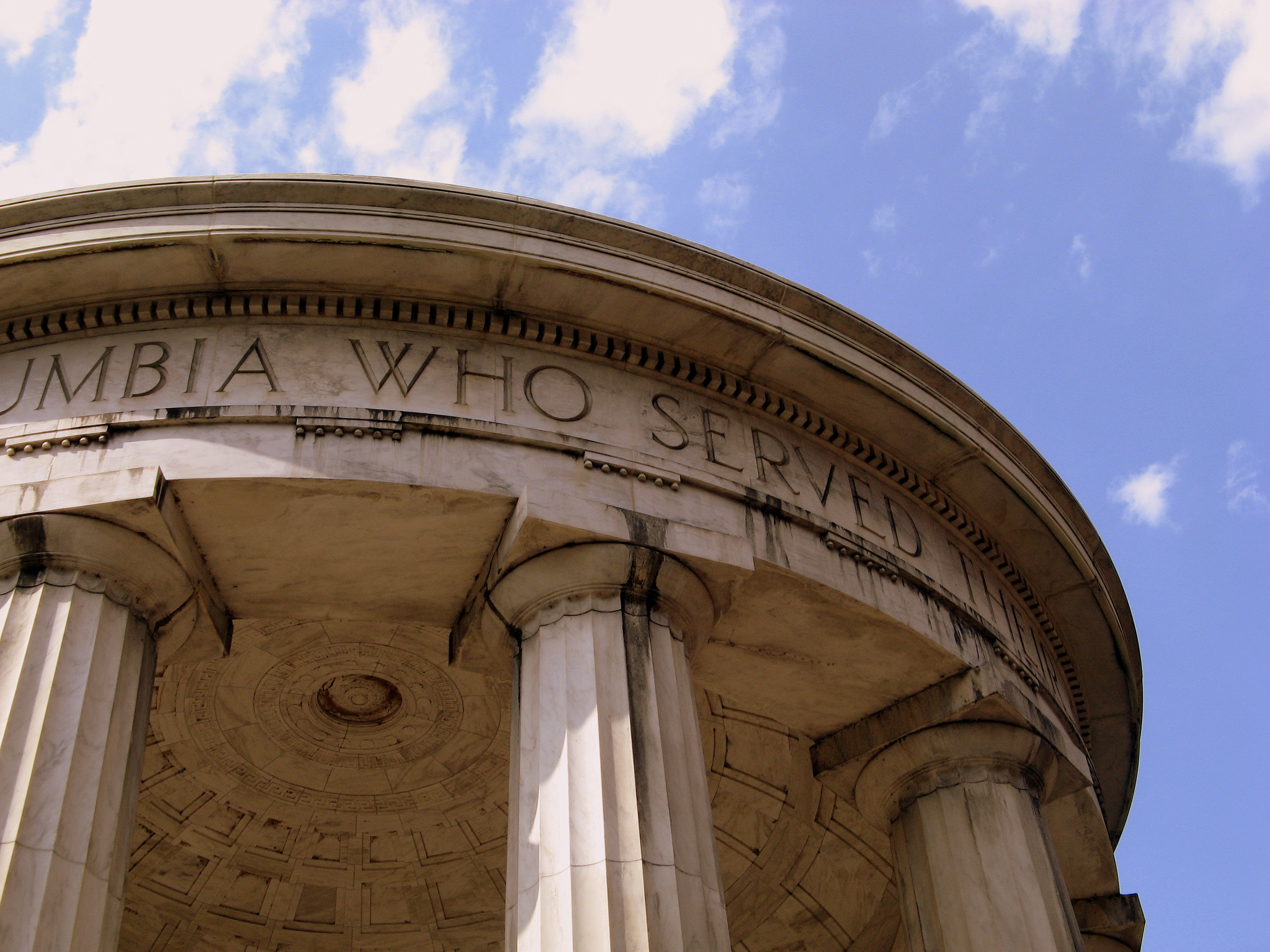
The World War I Memorial in Washington, D.C. shows the effects of the passing years.

Iconic memorials created after the war are designed as symbols of remembrance and as carefully contrived works of art.

In London, the Guards Memorial was designed by the sculptor Gilbert Ledward in 1923–26. The edifice was erected on Horse Guards Parade and dedicated to the five Foot Guards regiments of World War I. The bronze figures were cast from guns from the Great War, commemorating the First Battle of Ypres and other battles.

== Literature ==
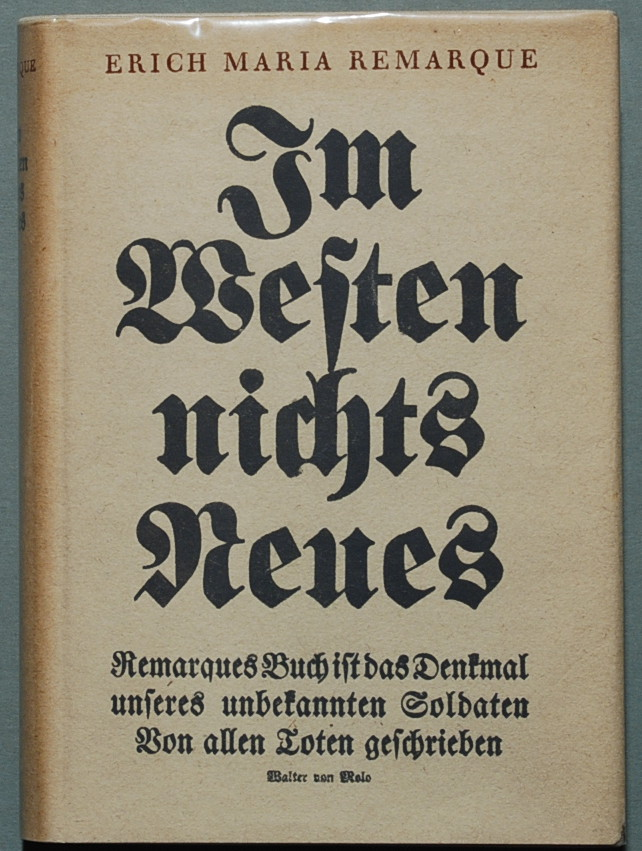
Remarque's All Quiet on the Western Front

World War I has been the subject of numerous novels; by far the most well-known is Erich Maria Remarque's All Quiet on the Western Front, which presented a bleak view of the war from the German perspective.

The war was also the subject of well-known poetry, most notably by Wilfred Owen and Siegfried Sassoon, both of whom served in the war (as did Remarque). Another notable poem is "In Flanders Fields" by Canadian soldier John McCrae, who also served in the war; it led to the use of the remembrance poppy as a symbol for soldiers who have died in war.

Several entire genres grew out of the disillusionment and disappointment of World War I. The hard-boiled detective novels of the 1920s featured bitter veteran protagonists. The horror stories of H. P. Lovecraft after the war showed a new sense of nihilism and despair in the face of an uncaring, chaotic cosmos, very unlike his more conventional horror before the war.

World War I was never quite so fertile a topic as World War II for American fiction, but there were, nevertheless, a large number of fictional works created about it in Europe, Canada, and Australia. Many war novels, however, have fallen out of print since their original publication. Numerous scholarly studies have covered the major fictional authors and writings.

=== By participants ===
- Tell England by Ernest Raymond
- All Quiet on the Western Front and The Road Back by Erich Maria Remarque (German)
- The Good Soldier Švejk by Jaroslav Hašek (Czech)
- A Farewell to Arms by Ernest Hemingway (American)
- The Middle Parts of Fortune by Frederic Manning (Australian)
- Death of a Hero by Richard Aldington
- Ashenden by W. Somerset Maugham
- A Year on the Plateau (or Sardinian Brigade) by Emilio Lussu (Italian)
- Parade's End by Ford Madox Ford (British)
- Under Fire by Henri Barbusse (French)
- Journey's End by R. C. Sherriff (British)
- The Spanish Farm trilogy by Ralph Hale Mottram (British)
- Generals Die in Bed by Charles Yale Harrison (Canadian)
- The German Prisoner by James Hanley (British)
- Goodbye to All That (memoir) by Robert Graves (British)
- Storm of Steel (memoir) by Ernst Jünger (German)
- Memoirs of an Infantry Officer (memoir) by Siegfried Sassoon (British)
- Testament of Youth (memoir) by Vera Brittain (British)
- Undertones of War (memoir) by Edmund Blunden (British)
- Ghosts have Warm Hands (memoir) by Will R. Bird (Canadian)
- The Enormous Room by E.E. Cummings (American)
- The Last Night of Love, the First Night of War by Camil Petrescu (Romanian)
- Three Soldiers by John Dos Passos (American)
- Paths of Glory by Humphrey Cobb (Canadian-American)

=== With primary emphasis on the war ===
- Across the Black Waters by Mulk Raj Anand
- The Major
- Johnny Got His Gun
- The Blue Max
- The Wars
- Billy Bishop Goes to War
- Regeneration and the Regeneration Trilogy
- An Ace Minus One
- The General
- "Rivka's War"
- Three Cheers for Me by Donald Jack
- The Wee Fellas

=== With the war as context or background ===
- The Return of the Soldier
- Barometer Rising
- Herbert West–Reanimator
- Rilla of Ingleside
- The Stones Are Hatching
- Fly Away Peter
- Soldiers' Pay (William Faulkner)
- How Young They Die (Stuart Cloete)
- Leviathan (Westerfeld novel)

== Theatre ==
Plays set during World War I include:

- Journey's End (1928), by R. C. Sherriff
- Oh, What a Lovely War! (1963), by Joan Littlewood
- The Accrington Pals (1982), by Peter Whelan
- Not About Heroes (1982), by Stephen MacDonald
- My Boy Jack (1997), by David Haig
- War Horse (2007), by Nick Stafford

== Films ==
Over 100 films have been set, in whole or in part, in World War I. Among the most notable are:

- Shoulder Arms (1918) - comedy starring Charlie Chaplin
- The Four Horsemen of the Apocalypse (1921) - drama starring Rudolph Valentino
- The Big Parade (1925) - an American soldier in France experiences both tragedy and love
- Wings (1927) - shows the relationship between two American World War I fighter pilots
- All Quiet on the Western Front (1930) - a group of German high school students join the army, but meet tragic fates during the war
- Hell's Angels (1930) - affairs during the war
- Doughboys (1930) - comedy starring Buster Keaton
- Pack Up Your Troubles (1932) - comedy starring Laurel and Hardy
- A Farewell to Arms (1932) - a tragic love story between an American ambulance driver in the Italian army and a Red Cross nurse
- Rasputin and the Empress (1932) - a biography of Grigori Rasputin, the infamous Russian mystic
- Secret Agent (1936) - about British espionage in Switzerland
- La Grande Illusion (1937) - a group of French prisoners of war plot an escape
- The Dawn Patrol (1938) - about British pilots fighting in France
- Sergeant York (1941) - a biopic of Alvin York, the most decorated American soldier of World War I
- Yankee Doodle Dandy (1942) - a biopic of songwriter and Broadway star, George M. Cohan
- Wilson (1944) - a biopic of Woodrow Wilson, the 28th President of America
- The African Queen (1951) - a Canadian boat captain and a female British missionary attempt to evade German forces in German East Africa
- What Price Glory? (1952) - Service comedy set on the Western Front in 1918.
- East of Eden (1955) - about an angry young man who wants his deeply religious father to love him like his brother
- Paths of Glory (1957) - about a commanding officer of French soldiers who defends them against a charge of cowardice during a court-martial trial
- Lawrence of Arabia (1962) - the adventures of T. E. Lawrence in the Arab Revolt against Turkish rule in present-day Egypt and Syria
- The Blue Max (1966) - an ambitious German Army Air Service fighter pilot seeks the aerial engagements to earn the German Empire's top military award, based on Jack D. Hunter's novel
- Oh! What a Lovely War (1969) - comedy with an all-star British cast
- Johnny Got His Gun (1971) - an American soldier is rendered immobile after being hit by an artillery shell
- Gallipoli (1981) - several men from rural Western Australia take part in the Gallipoli Campaign in Turkey
- Passchendaele (2008) - a Canadian soldier experiences both love and tragedy during the months-long Battle of Passchendaele
- War Horse (2011) - a teenage boy whose horse is conscripted for the war joins the British army to reunite with it
- Wonder Woman (2017) - Wonder Woman fights in the war for the Allies
- 1917 (2019) - two young British soldiers are given a mission to deliver a message warning of a German ambush
- The King's Man (2021) - Orlando, Duke of Oxford, fights against a secret group that conspires to change the course of World War 1
- All Quiet on the Western Front (Im Westen nicht Neues) (2022) - a retelling of Remarque's novel by German filmmakers

== Television ==
There have been several television series and miniseries set during World War I.

In 1964, the British Broadcasting Corporation, in cooperation with its counterparts with Australia and Canada, had a 26-part series called The Great War. It focused on the aspects of World War I.

The 1969 Doctor Who science fiction serial "The War Games" initially appears to be set in no man's land in World War I, although it is later revealed that British and German soldiers from World War I have been transported to an alien planet along with the armies of other historical wars from human history.

The fourth series of the 1971–75 British television drama Upstairs, Downstairs, which aired in 1974, was set during the years of World War I and showed the war's effects from the perspective of a townhouse in London.

The 1985 Australian miniseries Anzacs was about members of the Australian and New Zealand Army Corps during World War I, and the 2015 miniseries Gallipoli was about the Gallipoli campaign.

Blackadder Goes Forth, the fourth and final series of the British sitcom Blackadder, which aired in 1989, presented a satirical view of the war and the British military.

My Boy Jack was a 2007 television film, adapted from the play of the same name, about Rudyard Kipling's son, who was killed in France.

The second season of the British television drama Downton Abbey, which aired in 2011, showed the effects of the war mostly from the perspective of the eponymous estate. The season particularly focused on how great houses in Britain served as convalescent homes during the war.

World War I is used for the season 2 episode "The War to End All Wars" of the NBC series Timeless. In the episode, Rufus and Wyatt travel to World War I on September 14, 1918, to save Lucy from Rittenhouse.

In the Japanese novel, manga, and anime isekai series The Saga of Tanya the Evil, its central story revolves around a modern world Japanese protagonist being reincarnated in an alternate universe's equivalent of Imperial Germany and subsequently a slightly delayed World War I; whereas individuals can possess magical power, and a certain "entity/deity" would actively involve itself with many individuals' affairs.

In addition:

- "Birdsong (TV serial)" (2012)
- "Wipers Times" (2013)

== Popular songs ==
- Over the Top (1917), Marion Phelps and Maxwell Goldman
- The Call of the U.S.A. (1918), John J. Donahue
- Various songs by Sabaton
- "And The Band Played Waltzing Matilda" (1972), song by Eric Bogle
- "No Man's Land" (also known as The Green Fields of France and Willie McBride) (1976), song by Eric Bogle
- "Barón Rojo" (1981) Barón Rojo
- "Christmas in the Trenches" (1984) by John McCutcheon
- "Children's Crusade" (1985), song by Sting
- "One" (1989), song by Metallica
- "All Together Now" (1990), song by The Farm
- "Scream Aim Fire" (2008), song by Bullet for My Valentine
- "All Your Friends" (2014), song by Coldplay

== Video games ==
There have been comparably few games set during World War I. Many of those that have been made focused on the air war, such as Sopwith from 1984. However, NecroVision is one of the few first person shooters games set in World War I, where the player fights on known battlefields during the war, such as the Somme. Call of Duty: Black Ops II's final DLC pack features "Origins", a zombie map that is set in a dieselpunk France during World War I.

Valiant Hearts: The Great War was released by Ubisoft in 2014. The game is about four characters who help a German soldier find his true love. This adventure is inspired by letters written during World War I.

While not many video games are set during World War I, there has been a considerable amount of modifications for other games that change these either partially or completely into the World War I setting (such as "The Great War" mod for Napoleon: Total War).

On May 7, 2016, EA DICE revealed Battlefield 1, a first-person shooter video game primarily set in World War I featuring the Harlem Hellfighters, the Red Baron, and Lawrence of Arabia. It was released on October 21, 2016, for Microsoft Windows, PlayStation 4, and Xbox One.

In the 2019 game Death Stranding, player character Sam Porter Bridges encounters hostile skeletal soldiers in American World War I-era uniforms within a World War I trench.

Other examples include:

- Red Baron (1980)
- Blue Max (1983)
- Diplomacy (1984)
- Sky Kid (1985)
- Red Baron (1990)
- Wings (1990)
- Verdun (2015)
- 11-11: Memories Retold (2018)
- Ad Infinitum (2023)
- Amnesia: The Bunker (2023)

== Centennial ==
The years from 2014 to 2019 represented the centennial of the First World War. Over this period, several groups commemorated individuals, battles, and movements connected to the war, often with an emphasis on national identities.

== See also ==
- British propaganda during World War I
- Italian propaganda during World War I
- World War II in popular culture
- War novel
- Literature of World War I
