= Emeline Bachelder Gurney =

Figure in American folklore

Emeline Bachelder Gurney (1816–1897) was a woman from Fayette, Maine, who, according to legend, was shunned by her family and community for giving birth to a baby boy out of wedlock and then unwittingly marrying that boy after he became an adult. Emeline gained notoriety after death, with her life story inspiring a documentary, then a book and a play.

== Folklore ==
Emeline's story was first recorded by documentary filmmaker David Hoffman while interviewing Nettie Mitchell, a local newspaper reporter and lifelong resident of Fayette. Hoffman later featured this interview in Sins of Our Mothers: The Story of Emeline, a 1989 documentary he directed. Mitchell, who said she met Emeline when she was a child, claimed Emeline's family sent her to work in a factory in Lynn, Massachusetts (although she most likely meant to say Lowell, Massachusetts) when she was fourteen to help support her family. There Emeline, who Mitchell describes as very pretty, fell in love with the factory owner's son who impregnated her. Emeline found a local couple who agreed to adopt her child after it was born. The couple supported Emeline financially throughout her pregnancy and paid her travel expenses back to Fayette. Years after she returned, she married a newly arrived road worker from Massachusetts who was younger than her. The pair fell in love and married shortly after meeting. The young man's parents then visited the newlyweds in Fayette and made the shocking discovery that the now-adult Emeline was the teenage girl from whom they had adopted their baby boy. In other words, Emeline had unwittingly married her own son. The marriage was annulled and her former husband reluctantly abandoned her. Afterwards, most of the residents of Fayette shunned her due to her illegitimate child and her incestuous marriage. She survived by raising chickens and growing vegetables but, years later, Emeline died alone in her tiny cottage from starvation after a harsh winter because she ran out of food. Her community then gave her a simple funeral. According to Mitchell, her mother attended the service at Moose Hill church during which one of Emeline's sisters placed one hand on the cheap wooden casket, held the other up and said to those gathered "at last she has paid for her sin." According to Mitchell, her mild-mannered mother returned from the funeral "so up upset and so angry" and remembered that her mother said "I think her sister sinned more than she.” The town's residents refused to bury her in nearby Moose Hill Cemetery so her body lies in an unmarked grave under a nearby road. Nettie Mitchell is the only known source for this version of Gurney's life.

== Life and Death According to Documents ==
According to church and census records, Emeline was born on January 30, 1816, the fourth child of Aaron and Sophia (née Gould) Bachelder. She had three older siblings, Henrietta (1810–1886), David Stephen (1811–1882), and Lucy (1814–1816), and a younger sister, Hannah (1818–1908). The family was impoverished and struggled to financially support their children. There is no evidence of Emeline ever living in Lynn or Lowell or working in a factory. Census documents show she lived with other families as a young woman suggesting she was a pauper, an impoverished person supported by strangers in exchange for free labor who in turn receive money from a government entity. Her only connection to Lowell was her brother David who lived there with his wife and children. Emeline eventually married George Chamberlain and the marriage produced a son, Gustavus Chamberlain (1844-1901). It's unknown how many years the couple lived together as George eventually abandoned Emeline and left her destitute. Although her first husband never officially divorced her, Emeline later married Leonard Bolles Gurney, on April 16, 1878. Both of her husbands were older than her and there's no evidence she was related to them. Emeline, widowed after Leonard's death, died from dysentery (not starvation) on October 9, 1897 according to her death certificate. No records of her burial are known to exist.

== Legacy ==
- The book Emmeline (1980), written by Judith Rossner, is a fictionalized account of her life.
- The PBS American Experience documentary Sins of Our Mothers: The Story of Emeline (1989) is a factual examination of her life and times.
- The opera Emmeline (1996), composed by Tobias Picker, is based on Judith Rossner's book.
