= Olivia (Rossner novel) =

1994 novel by Judith Rossner

Olivia (Or, The Weight of the Past)
- First edition
- Author: Judith Rossner
- Language: English
- Publisher: Crown
- Publication date: 1994
- Publication place: United States
- Media type: Print (Cloth; Paper)

Olivia (or, The Weight of the Past) is the penultimate novel by Judith Rossner, author of the critically acclaimed best sellers Looking for Mr. Goodbar and August. Published in 1994 by Crown, Olivia examines "a mother-daughter conflict set in the world of gastronomy." ,

== Plot ==
Caroline Sindler is a chef and popular cooking teacher. In flashback, she recounts her past life: after showing an early interest, she learns to cook. After dropping out of college, she travels to Italy, where she finds work in a restaurant and meets Angelo, a Sicilian in his thirties. After becoming pregnant by him, she marries him and gives birth to their daughter, Olivia.

Eventually, Caroline and Angelo establish their own restaurant in Rome, but their marriage begins to disintegrate. After several episodes of abuse, Caroline divorces Angelo, leaving twelve-year-old Olivia, who prefers her father, in Rome. She tries to maintain a relationship with her daughter, but Olivia wants nothing to do with her mother. Some years later, however, not getting along with her father's new wife, Olivia moves to the United States and goes to live with her mother.

A good student in high school, Olivia sets her sights on Harvard. She takes a part-time job babysitting for Leon Klein, a doctor who lives upstairs. In the meantime, Caroline strikes up a casual friendship with Leon and his children, preparing matzo ball soup for them and teaching the children to bake cookies. Caroline and Leon begin to date. At around this time, Olivia begins to date the much-older Pablo Cruz, and Caroline—despite her liking of Pablo—disapproves of the age difference.

Caroline's relationship with Leon intensifies, but she backs out of plans to marry. When Caroline learns that Olivia is pregnant, she promises to arrange an abortion for Olivia. Olivia, however, has been dissuaded by Pablo, and they run off to Florida, where they marry in a civil ceremony. When they return, they announce their intention to marry in the Catholic Church in order to please Pablo's family and Caroline reluctantly agrees to cater the event, which angers Leon, who correctly guesses that Caroline is not pushing Olivia to abort the pregnancy because she secretly wishes to become the baby's primary caretaker.

After Olivia and Pablo's wedding, Caroline and Leon get married as well (serving kosher food at their ceremony). Soon afterward, Olivia gives birth to Donna and sinks into a deep post-partum depression, completely ignoring the baby. The work of caring for the baby falls to Pablo and Caroline. Olivia slowly recovers, and she settles into a reasonably friendly relationship with her mother. She even finds that not all of her memories of her mother are negative ones. At the novel's end, Olivia is holding Donna in her lap.

== Critical reception ==
As were most of Rossner's novels, Olivia was a critical success. Publishers Weekly, in its review, found Rossner to be "in top form," stating that "Anyone who likes to eat, cook or read about food will savor Rossner's descriptions of tasty dishes and culinary lore, conveyed with gusto and sensuous detail."

The Los Angeles Times noted that Olivia is "a remarkable exploration of the intimate, complex connections between food and emotion...."

Ruth Reichl of The New York Times wrote in 1994, "Few writers are better than Judith Rossner at describing the agonized ties between mothers and daughters."

Kirkus Reviews, in turn, praised Rossner for her "engrossing characters."
