= Emmeline (Rossner novel) =

Novel by Judith Rossner

- First edition
- Author: Judith Rossner
- Language: English
- Publisher: Simon & Schuster
- Publication date: 1980
- Publication place: United States
- Media type: Print (Cloth; Paper)
- Preceded by: Attachments
- Followed by: August

Emmeline is a book by Judith Rossner. Published in 1980, Emmeline details the local legend of a woman who becomes ostracized by everyone in her hometown in Maine after a shocking, long-held secret becomes public. The story is a fictionalized account of the life of Emeline Bachelder Gurney. Both anecdotal and documented evidence have been found about Gurney's life.

Filmmaker David Hoffman posted an interview from the 1970s with a Maine journalist named Nettie Mitchell (1886-1981), who at age 89 spoke about having directly known Emeline Bachelder Gurney.

An operatic version by Tobias Picker (libretto by J. D. McClatchy) premiered in 1996 as a commission of the Santa Fe Opera and has enjoyed considerable success. It has been recorded, televised on PBS, and produced in full-scale and chamber productions.

== Plot ==
In 1839, thirteen-year-old Emmeline Mosher lives on a farm with her family in Fayette, Maine. Times are hard, so when Emmeline's paternal aunt suggests that she go to Lowell, Massachusetts to support her family by working in a textile mill, Emmeline dutifully leaves home.

When she arrives in Lowell, she is sent to live in a boarding house for young female mill-workers. Emmeline is a good worker. However, she is unable to befriend any of the other girls (because of being a favorite of Mrs. Bass) who look down on her due to her country ways and her relative youth. The lonely young girl is easily seduced by the factory owner's daughter's Irish-born husband and becomes pregnant. She is not immediately aware of her condition, but others are: the mill expels her and the embarrassed boarding-house landlady contacts Emmeline's aunt, who lives in the neighboring town of Lynn, Massachusetts, and evicts the girl.

Fearful of Emmeline's parents' reaction, Emmeline's aunt and uncle help her conceal her pregnancy. They send letters and Emmeline's savings, which they pass off as her regular salary, to her parents. They also arrange to have Emmeline's baby adopted. Emmeline imagines she will have a girl, and gives birth to what she believes is a girl; her aunt refuses to let her see the child or even know its gender, believing that Emmeline can more easily give up the child and recuperate from her ordeal. Soon after giving birth, Emmeline returns to Maine.

Part two of the book picks up more than 20 years later. Despite numerous proposals, a middle-aged Emmeline has never married and cares for her parents, but her father still encourages her to marry. She has a circle of friends, socializing primarily with two sisters of a widower who proposes marriage to her. One day, itinerant worker Matthew Gurney rolls into town. He and Emmeline share a strong immediate attraction. Matthew proposes to her and Emmeline eagerly accepts. They marry, with Emmeline wearing her sister-in-law's wedding dress, and move into a house that they build themselves.

When Emmeline's aunt visits after the wedding, she instantly recognizes Matthew and forces him to admit that he is 21 years old, not 26 as he originally claimed. At that moment, Emmeline realizes that she gave birth to a boy, not a girl, and that she has married her son. Her aunt tells her father, who immediately disowns her. Word quickly spreads throughout town. Matthew deserts Emmeline, who is soon excommunicated by the preacher at her church and encouraged to leave town.

Emmeline spends the rest of her long life on the fringes of the town, ignored by all. She tries to subsist on what she can grow herself. Neglected as an old woman, she dies during a particularly harsh winter.

== Reception ==
Emmeline received a starred review from Kirkus Reviews, which called it "A strange, in some ways difficult book--but a grave tale of lingering impact." Chicago Tribune reviewer Susan Fromberg Schaeffer drew comparisons to Wuthering Heights and Jane Eyre, calling it "a novel of rare knowledge and great power, masterfully told."
