= Fred Marcellino =

American writer

- Born: October 25, 1939; Brooklyn, New York, United States
- Died: July 12, 2001 (aged 61); New York City, New York, United States
- Known for: Book jacket design, children's book illustration
- Website: fredmarcellino.com

Fred Marcellino (October 25, 1939 – July 12, 2001) was an American illustrator and later an author of children's books who was very influential in the book industry. Publisher Nan Talese said that Marcellino could "in one image, translate the whole feeling and style of a book." Such was the case with his evocative painting for Judith Rossner's August, published and edited by Talese.

Among many other commissions, he was responsible for the covers of Margaret Atwood's novel The Handmaid's Tale, Tom Wolfe's The Bonfire of the Vanities and the 1987 Dell Laurel Leaf edition of Allen Appel's Time After Time.

== Early life ==
Born in Brooklyn, Marcellino began as an abstract expressionist painter and spent 1963 studying in Venice on a Fulbright Scholarship. Returning to the United States, he went in a new direction as a designer and illustrator with the main focus on LP cover art illustrating the albums of such singers and groups as Loretta Lynn, Manhattan Transfer and Fleetwood Mac. By 1969, he was creating record album covers for Capitol, Decca and PolyGram.

== Book jackets ==
He entered the book publishing field in the 1970s, producing more than 40 jackets a year until he turned to children's books in the late 1980s. His designs, which traded marketing-driven covers for elegant images and typography, are credited with revolutionizing book jacket design in the United States, and he produced jackets for bestselling authors including Tom Wolfe, Margaret Atwood, Milan Kundera, and Anne Tyler.

Illustrators were sometimes presented with tip sheets suggesting pages in the manuscript the illustrator might find a suitable character or location to illustrate. Marcellino, however, insisted on reading the entire manuscript and producing a carefully designed, tasteful illustration that captured the overall mood of the book, often symbolically. Art director Steven Heller described Marcellino's approach:

His surreal landscapes, exotic backdrops, impressionist palette, and precisionist typography defined a particular kind of literary genre. By "defined" I mean Marcellino gave authors including Anne Tyler, Tom Wolfe, Milan Kundera, Judith Rossner, Margaret Atwood and Primo Levi, to name but a few, a visual persona that underscored their words and ideas. Marcellino's distinctive personal style never conflicted with the writers' character, but like the best graphic interpreters he added dimension that was not always there. He also, and perhaps most importantly, challenged the strict marketing conventions imposed on packaging fiction and non-fiction blockbusters that required gigantic type for the author's name and a small, literal illustration of the plot or theme. Although these kinds of covers grabbed attention there was little aesthetic resonance. Marcellino introduced subtly painted and smartly lettered mini-posters that established allure. He was a master of sky and many of his book jacket illustrations use rich, cloud-studded skyscapes as backdrops and dramatic light sources for effect. He typically rendered the light of early dawn and late afternoon in pastel hues and airbrush smoothness to create surreal auras. The way in which he manipulated light on such subjects as walls, chairs, and doors enabled him to transform the commonplace into charged graphic symbols.

== Children's books ==
In the mid-1980s, he began doing children's books, starting with Tor Seidler's A Rat's Tale. He found it to be a different experience, commenting:

Each picture is a link in a chain, and they all exist in counterpoint with the text. And although you want each picture to have impact, just like a jacket, the book illustration can also be much more subtle. It can be pondered and savored over a period of time. It's a very different discipline from what I was used to, but I must say it was love at first sight.

Charles Perrault's Puss in Boots, his first full-color picture book, won a 1991 Caldecott Medal, and he won more awards with The Steadfast Tin Soldier, The Wainscott Weasel, The Pelican Chorus and Other Nonsense, The Story of Little Babaji (a revision of The Story of Little Black Sambo) and Ouch! (adapted from the Grimm tale, The Devil and His Three Golden Hairs).

He moved into writing with I, Crocodile (1999), honored by The New York Times (Best Books of the Year), Publishers Weekly (Best Book of the Year), Child magazine (Best Book of the Year), The New York Times Book Review (Ten Best Illustrated Picture Books) and the ALA Notable Book.

In 1998, he was diagnosed with colon cancer, and he died on July 12, 2001. At the time of his death, he was working on the I, Crocodile sequel, Arrivederci, Crocodile.

In December 2016, it was announced that Arrivederci, Crocodile would be completed by the French illustrator Eric Puybaret and published in September 2019 by Atheneum.

== Exhibitions ==
• November 9, 2002 - January 26, 2003: Norman Rockwell Museum, Stockbridge, Massachusetts
• April 7 - July 29, 2007: Los Angeles Public Library, Los Angeles, California
• June 9 - October 29, 2011: National Center for Children's Illustrated Literature, Abilene, TX
• April 6 - May 20, 2012: Stamford Museum and Nature Center, Stamford, CT
• July 14 - September 29, 2012: Joslyn Art Museum, Omaha, Nebraska
• October 15 - December 24, 2012: Abraham Art Gallery at Wayland Baptist University, Plainview, TX
• March 28 - June 2, 2013: Children's Museum of Houston, Houston, TX
• November 17, 2013 - January 17, 2014: Greater Denton Arts Council, Denton, TX
• June 30, 2015 - October 25, 2015: Eric Carle Museum of Picture Book Art, Amherst, MA
