= Wrangler (University of Cambridge) =

Student laurel

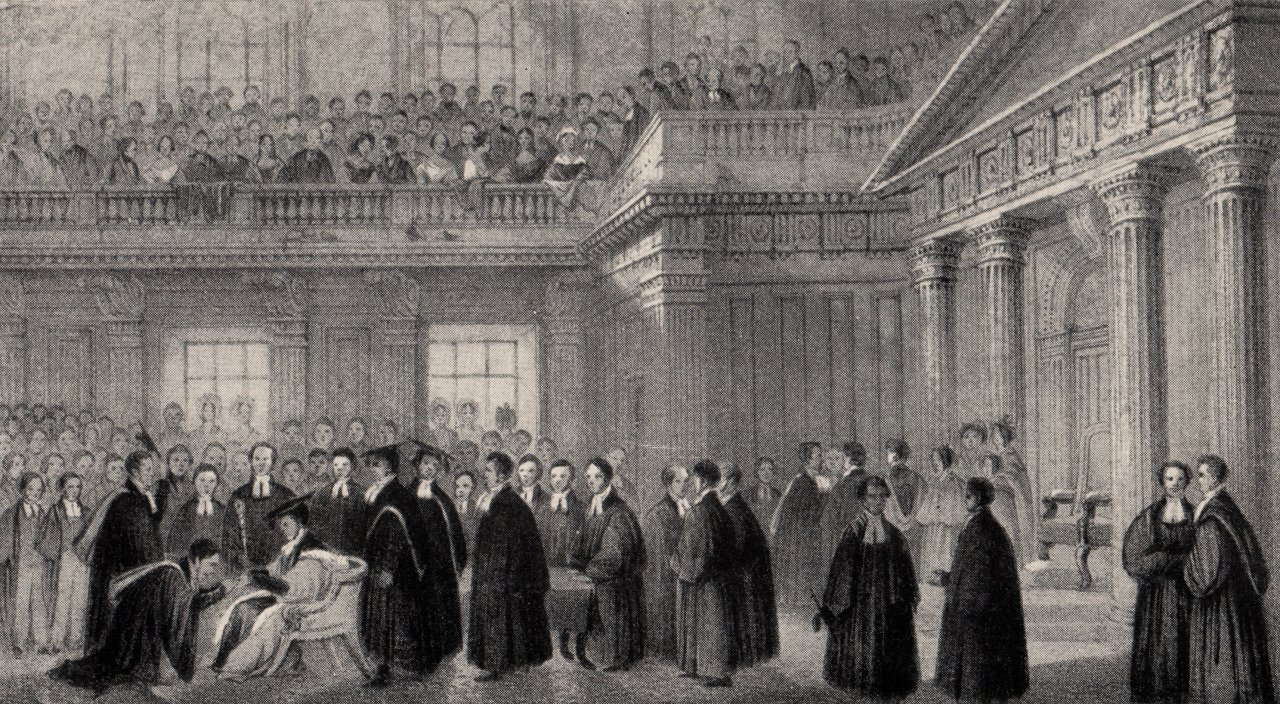
A student is named as Senior Wrangler in 1842, an accolade "synonymous with academic supremacy".

At the University of Cambridge in England, a "Wrangler" is a student who gains first-class honours in the Mathematical Tripos competition. The highest-scoring student is the Senior Wrangler, the second highest is the Second Wrangler, and so on. By contrast, the person who achieves the lowest exam marks while still earning a third-class honours degree (that is, while still earning an honours degree at all) is known as the wooden spoon.

== History ==
Until 1909, the university made the rankings public. Since 1910, it has publicly revealed only the class of degree gained by each student. An examiner reveals the identity of the Senior Wrangler "unofficially" by tipping his hat when reading out the person's name, but other rankings are communicated to each student privately. Therefore, the names of only some 20th-century Senior Wranglers (such as Crispin Nash-Williams, Christopher Budd, Frank P. Ramsey, Donald Coxeter, Kevin Buzzard, Jayant Narlikar, George Reid and Ben J. Green) have become publicly known.

Another standout was Philippa Fawcett. She was educated at Newnham College, Cambridge, which had been co-founded by her mother. In 1890, Fawcett became the first woman to obtain the top score in the Cambridge Mathematical Tripos exams. Her score was 13 per cent higher than the second-highest score. When the women's list was announced, Fawcett was described as "above the senior wrangler", but she did not receive the title of senior wrangler, as only men could then receive degrees, so only men were eligible for the Senior Wrangler title. The results were highly publicised, with the top scorers receiving great acclaim. Women had been allowed to take the Tripos since 1881, after Charlotte Angas Scott was unofficially ranked as eighth wrangler.

It was recorded that "virtually every high wrangler (for whom records exist) participated in some form of regular physical exercise to preserve his strength and stamina."

Obtaining the position of a highly ranked Wrangler created many opportunities for the individual's subsequent profession. Such individuals would often become Fellows, before moving on to other professions. Throughout the United Kingdom and the British Empire, university mathematics professors were often among the top three Wranglers.

The order of Wranglers was widely publicised and shaped the public perception of mathematics as being the most intellectually challenging subject. According to Andrew Warwick, author of Masters of Theory, the term "Senior Wrangler" became "synonymous with academic supremacy".

== Past wranglers ==
Top marks in the Cambridge mathematics exam did not always guarantee the Senior Wrangler success in life; the exams were largely a test of speed in applying familiar rules, and some of the most inventive and original students of Mathematics at Cambridge did not come top of their class. Lord Kelvin was second, William Henry Bragg was third, Augustus De Morgan and G. H. Hardy were fourth, Adam Sedgwick fifth, Bertrand Russell seventh, Thomas Robert Malthus ninth, John Maynard Keynes twelfth, and some fared even worse: Klaus Roth was not even a wrangler.

Joan Clarke, who helped to break the Nazi Enigma code at Bletchley Park, was a wrangler at Cambridge and earned a double first in mathematics, although she was prevented from receiving a full degree based on the university's policy of awarding degrees only to men. That policy was abandoned in 1948.

The 15th Astronomer Royal, Martin Rees, a wrangler, went on to become one of the world's leading scientists, holding the posts of Master of Trinity College at Cambridge and President of the Royal Society and receiving membership in the Order of Merit.

== Optimes ==
Students who achieve second-class and third-class mathematics degrees are known as Senior Optimes (second-class) and Junior Optimes (third-class). Cambridge did not divide its examination classification in mathematics into 2:1s and 2:2s until 1995 but now there are Senior Optimes Division 1 and Senior Optimes Division 2.

== In fiction ==
- "The Senior Wrangler" is a member of the faculty of Unseen University in Terry Pratchett's Discworld series of novels.
- Roger Hamley, a character in Elizabeth Gaskell's Wives and Daughters, achieved the rank of Senior Wrangler.
- Vivie Warren, the headstrong heroine of George Bernard Shaw's Mrs. Warren's Profession (1893) and daughter of the play's infamous madam, tied with the Third Wrangler, settling for that place because she recognized that "it was not worth [her] while to face the grind" because she did not intend an academic career for herself.
- "Wrangler" is a jargon term applied to codebreakers in some of John Le Carré's spy novels, such as Tinker Tailor Soldier Spy.
- Thomas Jericho, the main character of Robert Harris's book Enigma, was Senior Wrangler in 1938.
- In Ford Madox Ford's Parade's End, reference is made to the fact that Christopher Tietjens left Cambridge as "a mere Second Wrangler".
- In Rumer Godden's In This House of Brede, Dame Agnes is noted to have been Eighth Wrangler before entering the abbey.
- In C S Forester's book, The General, a member of the main character's staff (the deputy assistant quartermaster-general, Spiller) is described as a Second Wrangler.
- In Bram Stoker's "The Judge's House", the main character Malcom Malcomson is looking for a quiet place to stay whilst preparing his Mathematical Tripos examinations. Mrs Witham, the inn's landlady, warns Malcom about the judge's house, but the charwoman, Mrs Dempster, dispels these fears – explaining she is not afraid of 'bogies' because they are only rats. Malcom replies: "Mrs. Dempster, [...] you know more than a Senior Wrangler! And let me say, that, as a mark of esteem for your indubitable soundness of head and heart, I shall, when I go, give you possession of this house, and let you stay here by yourself for the last two months of my tenancy, for four weeks will serve my purpose."

== See also ==
- List of mathematics awards
