= Time After Time (Appel novel) =

1985 novel by Allen Appel

- Cover art for the 1987 Dell Laurel Leaf edition
- Author: Allen Appel
- Cover artist: Fred Marcellino
- Series: Pastmaster series
- Genre: Science fiction
- Published: 1985 by Carroll & Graf
- Media type: Print
- Pages: 372
- ISBN: 978-0-8818-4182-4
- OCLC: 12214365
- Dewey Decimal: 813.54
- LC Class: PS3551.P552
- Followed by: Twice Upon A Time

Time After Time is a novel by Allen Appel, first published in 1985 by Carroll & Graf. It launched the Alex Balfour series of time travel novels, which the author usually refers to as the "Pastmaster" series.

== Characters and story ==
The story follows New School history professor Alex Balfour as he is tossed back and forth between present-day New York City and the Russian Revolution of 1917. Seeking an explanation for his unusual situation, Alex attempts to save Czar Nicholas and his family. In the course of the novel, he encounters Ivan Pavlov, Vladimir Lenin, Leon Trotsky and Grigory Rasputin.

Along with favorable reviews, the novel received recognition from the American Library Association as one of the Best Young Adult Novels of the Year . The novel gained more readers with a 1987 Dell Laurel Leaf edition displaying cover art by renowned illustrator Fred Marcellino, and it was reprinted again as a Dell mass-market paperback in 1990.

Other books in the series are Twice Upon a Time (1988), an American Library Association nominee in the Best Young Adult Novels of the Year category, and Till the End of Time (1990), another ALA nominee. In Time of War (2003) takes place during the American Civil War. Sea of Time, set aboard the Titanic, was written in 1987 but never published.
