= George Manahan =

American conductor (born 1952)

George Manahan (born 1952, Atlanta, Georgia, USA) is an American conductor.

== Biography ==
Manahan's parents were church musicians. In high school, he was a drum major in his high school marching band, and also conducted this band. Another of his earliest musical engagements was as conductor of a pit orchestra at the Six Flags Over Georgia amusement park. He studied piano and conducting at the Manhattan School of Music, where his teachers included Anton Coppola and George Schick. He graduated from the Manhattan School of Music with a Bachelor of Music degree in 1973 and a Master of Music degree in 1976. He was named to the Manhattan School of Music faculty after his graduation. In parallel with this appointment, the Juilliard School awarded him a fellowship as Assistant Conductor with the American Opera Center. Manahan has since remained on the Manhattan School of Music faculty, as director of orchestral studies.

Manahan was the Exxon Arts Endowment Conductor of the New Jersey Symphony Orchestra (NJSO), and interim music director of the NJSO from 1983 to 1985. He was a finalist for the position of Music Director of the Florida Symphony Orchestra in 1986. He has also served as conductor of the Steve Reich Ensemble. He was music director of the Richmond Symphony Orchestra from 1987 to 1998. During his Richmond tenure, the orchestra received five ASCAP awards for "Adventuresome Programming of Contemporary Music". He was principal conductor of Minnesota Opera from 1988 to 1996.

Manahan made his professional opera conducting debut with the Santa Fe Opera in 1980, with the American premiere of Arnold Schoenberg's Von Heute Auf Morgen, as an emergency substitute conductor. He has since returned regularly to Santa Fe Opera, where his subsequent appearances have included conducting the world premiere of Tobias Picker's and J.D. McClatchy's Emmeline. He was music director of Opera Omaha for the 1982-1983 season. In 1983, he was named music director of the New York City Opera National Company, the touring division of New York City Opera.

Manahan made his New York City Opera mainstage conducting debut in 1991. In 1996, the company named him its music director, and he began in the post in 1997. He held his New York City Opera tenure until the elimination of the music director position from the company in 2011. Manahan first guest-conducted at Portland Opera in 2005. He became music director of Portland Opera with the 2012-2013 season. Portland Opera announced the conclusion of Manahan's tenure as its music director in August 2021.

Manahan became music director of the American Composers Orchestra (ACO) with the 2010-2011 season. In January 2021, the ACO announced that Manahan is to conclude his music directorship of the ACO on 1 July 2021, and subsequently to take the title of music director emeritus. Other work in contemporary music has included conducting the world premiere of Terence Blanchard's and Michael Cristofer's Champion. Manahan was the 2012 winner of the Ditson Conductor's Award.

Cultural offices
Preceded by Jacques Houtmann	Music Director, Richmond Symphony Orchestra; 1987–1998	Succeeded by Mark Russel Smith
Preceded by Christopher Keene	Music Director, New York City Opera; 1997–2011	Succeeded by Jayce Ogren
Preceded by Steven Sloane	Music Director, American Composers Orchestra; 2010–2021	Succeeded by (post vacant)
Preceded by Louis Salemno	Music Director, Portland Opera; 2012–2021	Succeeded by (post vacant)
