= Irwin Rosenhouse =

Irwin J. Rosenhouse (1924-2002) was an American visual artist based in New York City.

== Early life and education ==
Rosenhouse was born in Chicago in 1924. He served in the US Merchant Marine and later earned his BFA from Cooper Union.

== Career ==
Rosenhouse's early career included work as a designer at the Museum of Modern Art and created illustrations for several publishing houses.

He also taught at Pratt Graphic Center, Brooklyn College, and New York City Technical College.

Rosenhouse illustrated a number of children's books including What Kind of Feet Does a Bear Have? (with text by future best-selling novelist Judith Rossner), Have You Seen Trees? and The Science Book of Magnets. He also illustrated The Coffee House Song Book.

He also created woodcuts for religious and history books, music scores for Paul Kapp's General Music Publishing Co, posters for The Arab-Israeli Peace Conference: The Road to Peace, 1989, and various record album covers for Folkways Records, MGM Records, Columbia Records, Paul Kapp's Serenus Records.

Rosenhouse's works have been shown at the Library of Congress, The Museum of Modern Art, The Brooklyn Museum, and the San Francisco Museum of Art. Additionally, his work is in permanent collections of the Smithsonian Institution.

Rosenhouse was the proprietor of the Rosenhouse Gallery in New York.

Awards include the Louis Comfort Tiffany Foundation Award, two-time recipient of the Huntington-Hartford fellowship, Billboard Annual Award and 1st Prize in the Rome Collaborative.

Rosenhouse resided in Nassau County, New York.

An award is given in his name by the Society of American Graphic Artists.
