= Allen Appel =

American novelist

Allen Appel (born January 6, 1945) is an American novelist best known for his series about time traveler Alex Balfour. In the series, fictional characters are interwoven with actual historical people and events.

Born in Bethlehem, Pennsylvania, Appel grew up in Parkersburg, West Virginia. He graduated from West Virginia University in 1967 and moved to Washington, D.C., where he found work as an illustrator and photographer. He made his mark with a series of collage illustrations for the Sunday magazine section of The Washington Post, and this work led to his first book, Proust's Last Beer: A History of Curious Demises (1980), a collaboration with writer Bob Arnebeck. Appel's imaginative black-and-white collages illustrated Arnebeck's profiles of people and animals.

== Novels ==
In the late 1970s and early 1980s, Appel wrote a half-dozen genre novels, but was unable to get them published. He finally scored with Time After Time, published in 1985 by Carroll & Graf. The story follows New School history professor Alex Balfour as he is tossed back and forth between present-day New York City and the Russian Revolution of 1917. While seeking an explanation for his unusual situation, Alex attempts to save Czar Nicholas and his family. In the course of the novel, he encounters Ivan Pavlov, Vladimir Lenin, Leon Trotsky and Grigory Rasputin.

Along with favorable reviews, the novel received recognition from the American Library Association as one of the Best Young Adult Novels of the Year. The novel gained more readers in a Dell Laurel Edition with cover art by renowned illustrator Fred Marcellino, and it was reprinted again as a Dell mass-market paperback in 1990.

Time After Time is the first of what became known as the Alex Balfour series, although the author usually refers to it as the Pastmaster series. The appearance of real-life historical figures became an expected device in the series.

The sequel Twice Upon a Time (also published in 1985), prominently featured Mark Twain and George Armstrong Custer, as it was set both around and during 1876's Battle of Little Bighorn, which was an American Library Association nominee in the Best Young Adult Novel of the Year category.

Orson Welles, Rita Hayworth, and Franklin D. Roosevelt are characters in the third book, Till the End of Time (1990), which was set in 1945 during the closing months of WWII. Subsequently, it too became an ALA nominee.

In Time of War (2003), the fourth in the series, takes place during the American Civil War, with both Ambrose Bierce and Abraham Lincoln being major characters.

Meanwhile, The Test of Time (2015), the fifth and most recently published Pastmaster book, is set in New York City, circa 1910, and features the return of an older Mark Twain, with appearances by both Nikola Tesla and Thomas Edison, who were that era's leading two inventors.

(Note: Originally intended to be the third Pastmaster novel, Sea of Time, set aboard the Titanic in 1912, was written in 1987, but went unpublished until late 2012, when it was released as a Kindle eBook exclusive on Amazon by the author.)

== Photography ==
Appel's work as a photographer is represented by the Kathleen Ewing Gallery.

== Bibliography ==
=== Fiction ===
- Time After Time (Carroll and Graf, 1985)
- Sea of Time (1987, traditionally unpublished; electronically published via Kindle, 2012)
- Twice Upon A Time (Carroll and Graf, 1988)
- Till the End of Time (Doubleday, 1990)
- In Time of War: An Alex Balfour Novel (Carroll and Graf, 2003)
- The Test of Time: An Alex Balfour Novel (Independent Publishing, 2015)
- Hellhound (with Craig Roberts) (Independent Publishing, 2014)

=== Non-fiction ===
- Proust 's Last Beer (illustrations, with Bob Arnebeck) - (Viking Press, 1982)
- From Father to Son: Wisdom for the Next Generation - (St. Martin's Press, 1993)
- Thanks, Dad - (St. Martin's Press, 1994, new edition, 1997, new edition 2007)
- Thanks, Mom (with Sherry Conway Appel) - (St. Martin's Press, 1994, new edition, 1997; new edition, 2007)
- From Mother to Daughter: Advice and Lessons for a Good Life (with Sherry Conway Appel) (St. Martin's Press, 1995)
- Wisdom from the Kitchen (with Sherry Conway Appel) - (St. Martin's Press, 1997)
- On the Birth of Your Child (with Sherry Conway Appel) - (St. Martin's Press, 1998)
- Old Dog's Guide for Pups (with Mike Rothmiller) - (St. Martin's Press, 2000)
- Thanks, to My Husband - (St. Martin's Press, 2002)
- Thanks, to My Wife - (St. Martin's Press, 2002)
- My Hero: Military Kids Write About Their Moms and Dads (with Mike Rothmiller) – (St. Martins Press, 2008)
