= The Wee Fellas =

2013 novel by Richard Maitland

- Author: Richard Maitland (Ken Houston)
- Language: English
- Genre: Novel
- Publisher: Lulu (hardcover); Amazon (Kindle)
- Publication date: February 2013
- Publication place: United Kingdom
- Media type: Print / Kindle
- Pages: 214
- ISBN: 978-1291609851

The Wee Fellas is a 2014 debut novel by Ken Houston, under his pen name Richard Maitland. It tells the story of a Bantam soldier who serves in the regular Army in World War I, finds another way to serve.

== Synopsis ==
The protagonist Billy "Stick" Stirling comes from a middle-class family which falls on hard times when their day-dreaming father abandons them. He grows up in Glasgow with his mother and ends up in trouble for a minor burglary. His experience toughens him and he employs his intelligence to rise above his diminutive stature to become a ruthless operator in the snooker halls of Glasgow.

A lethal confrontation leaves Billy with a family blood vengeance. In a Glasgow café, he meets a bearded, older stranger who is acquainted with his mother. The stranger advises him to join the Army Bantam Regiment (which accepted soldiers of small stature) to escape his troubles. Billy has little choice and enlists.

During his training in England, he meets his true love and has to leave her behind. She is already married to an active-duty soldier and becomes pregnant.

He is posted to the front line and applies his survival skills to good effect. He survives with bravery until his blood vengeance catches up with him in the trenches. He survives, but is seriously injured. He is invalided out of the Army and returns to Glasgow to overcome his injury and rebuild his life. The love he left finds him in Glasgow and surprises him.

He eventually rebuilds his life, establishing himself as a respect Scottish businessman and enjoying a stable family life with his wife and children.

== Conception ==
2014 was the 100th anniversary of the outbreak of World War I. The author's inspiration came from his interest and knowledge of military history. The Bantam regiments are largely an untold story of men who were smaller than the Army regulation height and rejected to fight in World War I.

The author decided to use a fictional narrative to explore details of the bantam soldiers, who are often missed in historical documents that refer to the bantam regiments. Many beings of diminutive size were involved in brawls - especially in bars usually initiated by taunts of their height and stature.

The author uses original songs from the Bantam soldiers to paint a historically accurate life of being a small soldier in the trenches.

The 'Wee Fellas' is a Scottish dialect phrase meaning the small men. The Bantam regiments originated in Cheshire. Scottish dialect is used throughout the text reflecting the language of Glasgow.

== Publication ==
The novel is published in paperback and Kindle format.

== Reception ==
The Scottish press carried articles in 2014

== Song lyrics ==
A bantam soldiers song used in the book.

"When the bantam roosters crow,

You'll find the enemy lying low,

Though we're not much in height,

Boy, how can we fight

Just count on the chickens

to give them a licking....

When we march into the line,

That's when we show up might fine.

Though we're not much in height,

Boy, how can we fight

When the bantam roosters crow"

== See also ==
- Soldier
- Bantam Hen
- World War 1
