= Judith Rossner =

American novelist

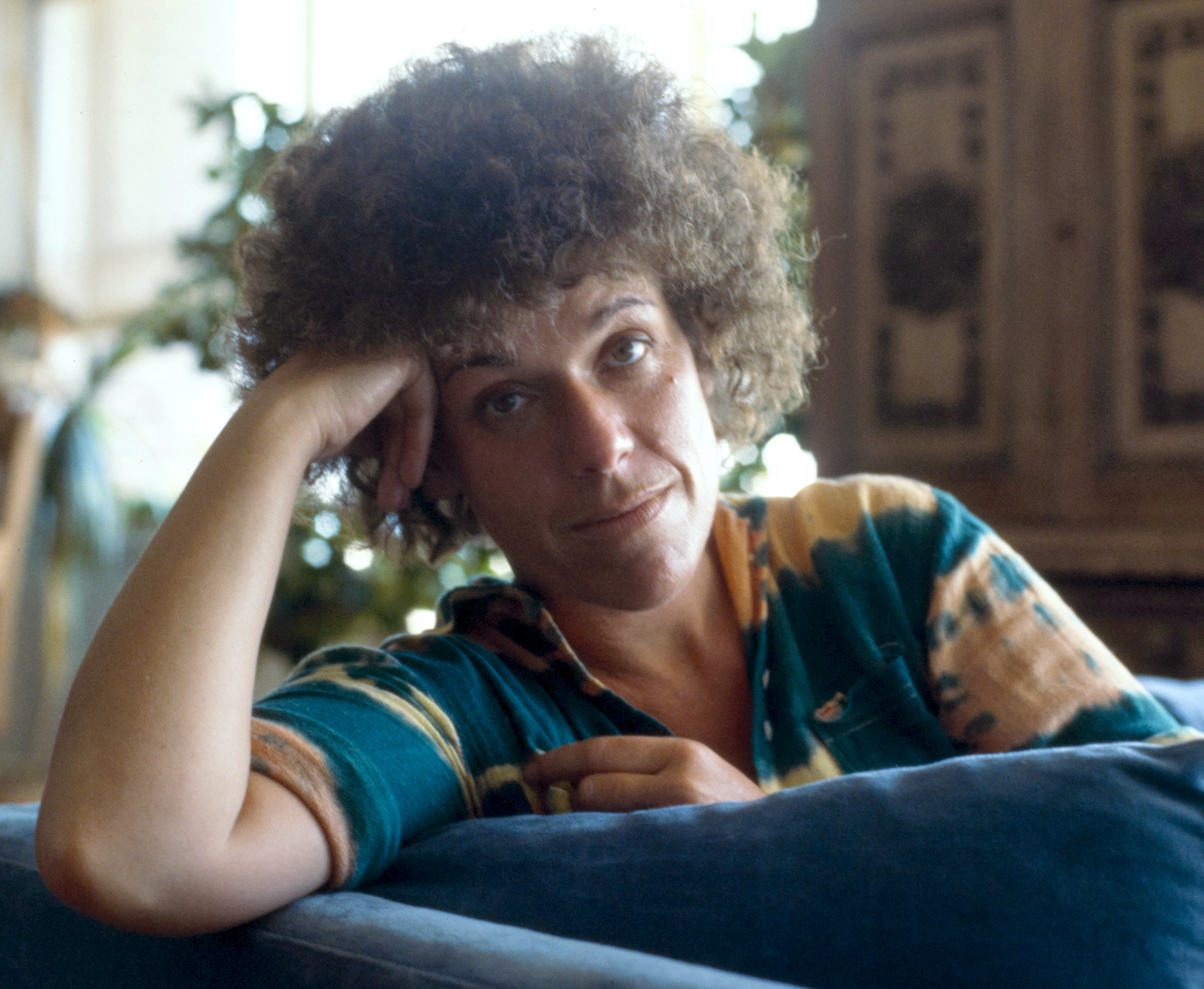
- Rossner, circa 1975
- Born: Judith Louise Perelman; March 31, 1935; New York City, US
- Died: August 9, 2005 (aged 70); New York City, US
- Occupation: Novelist
- Known for: Looking for Mr. Goodbar and August

Judith Rossner (born Judith Louise Perelman; March 31, 1935 – August 9, 2005) was an American novelist, best known for her acclaimed best sellers Looking for Mr. Goodbar (1975) and August (1983).

== Life and career, 1935–1973 ==
Born in New York City to a Jewish family, on March 31, 1935, Rossner was raised in the Bronx. Her father, Joseph Perelman, was a textile official; her mother, Dorothy (Shapiro) Perelman, was a public school-teacher. Rossner wanted to be a writer, even before she could read or write, and dictated poems and stories to her "warmly supportive" mother. She was also encouraged by an uncle, the American-Canadian writer Charles Yale Harrison, best known for his best-selling story of World War I, Generals Die in Bed (1930).

After graduating from Taft High School, Rossner attended the City College of New York from 1952-54. She left college to marry Robert Rossner (1932–1999), a teacher and writer. (Note: Robert Rossner is best known for mystery novels written as Ivan T. Ross; two of his titles are Requiem for a School Girl (1960) and Teacher's Blood (1964).) The couple had two children, Jean (born 1960) and Daniel (born 1965). Robert Rossner taught Creative Writing at the Bronx High School of Science.

She was unsuccessful in selling short stories to women's magazines, (Note: In one rejection slip, Rossner was informed that "[w]hen all is said and done, [your heroine] does not wear sufficiently rose-colored glasses for us." (Bernstein, Adam. Judith Rossner, 70; 'Mr. Goodbar' Author. The Washington Post, August 11, 2005. Accessed December 31, 2016.)) but, in 1963, she did publish a book for children, What Kind of Feet Does a Bear Have? (Bobbs-Merrill), with illustrations by Irwin Rosenhouse.

Rossner worked as a secretary at various jobs while continuing to write. She gave up a job at Scientific American because her interest in the work interfered with her writing. She went to work instead in a real estate office (where she was "bored out of [her] mind") and finished her first novel, To the Precipice. This story of a young woman who married her way out of poverty was published by William Morrow in 1966 to positive reviews. As Thomas Lask presciently noted in his review for The New York Times, "[Rossner] is a lady we will hear from again."

In 1969, Rossner published her second novel, Nine Months in the Life of an Old Maid (Dial Press), about a woman in her late 30s and her sister's unexpected pregnancy; The New York Times complimented its "... unusual literary climate rich in universal implications." After its publication, Rossner and her family moved to Acworth, New Hampshire, to live on a rural commune while her husband taught at a progressive school there. In 1971, missing the city, Rossner moved back to New York with her children. In 1972, she published Any Minute I Can Split (McGraw-Hill), the story of a very pregnant woman who leaves her husband and runs away to a commune, "a sunburst of human relationships." The following year, Rossner and her husband divorced. Rossner went to work as a secretary in a methadone clinic to support herself and her children.

== Looking for Mr. Goodbar, 1973–1977 ==
By the mid-1970s, Rossner was a writer of "impeccable literary credentials," but her three novels had not sold well. Following Any Minute I Can Split, Rossner began a novel about two women who marry conjoined twins. In the meantime, Nora Ephron, who was editing a women's issue of Esquire, invited Rossner to participate. Rossner, who had been recovering from a car accident, had become interested in the true story of Roseann Quinn, a 28-year-old schoolteacher who had been brutally murdered in January 1973 by a man she had reportedly picked up in a singles bar. Rossner wrote an article about Quinn, but Esquire declined to publish it, fearing legal ramifications. Rossner, who considered herself a "lousy journalist," decided to write the story as a novel.

On June 2, 1975, Simon & Schuster published Looking for Mr. Goodbar, the graphic story of Theresa Dunn, a damaged young woman who teaches children by day and cruises singles bars by night. After picking up a man at Mr. Goodbar, she is brutally murdered in her own bed. The book was an enormous critical and commercial success, selling some 4 million copies. It spent 36 weeks on the New York Times best seller list (three of which were at #1), becoming the fourth-highest selling novel of the year. Even Time magazine—rarely a champion of popular fiction—admitted, the book "richly deserves its success."

Rossner sold the film rights to Paramount for $250,000; the film adaptation was released in 1977. Written and directed by Richard Brooks, it stars Diane Keaton, Tuesday Weld, William Atherton, and Richard Gere. It received very mixed reviews, but was a success at the box office, earning $22.5 million ($86.9 million in 2016 dollars), and received two Academy Award nominations. (Note: Tuesday Weld was nominated as supporting actress, and William A. Fraker was nominated for his cinematography. Keaton, who was widely acclaimed for her performance as Theresa, was not nominated for this film, but instead won the Best Actress Oscar for her portrayal of Annie Hall.) Although Rossner herself "detested" the film, she praised Diane Keaton's performance.

In 2012, the novel was adapted as Goodbar, a "staged concept album," by the band Bambi and the performing arts group Waterwell. It was presented at the Public Theater in New York as part of the Under the Radar Festival.

== Life and career, 1977–1990 ==
Following the success of Goodbar, which brought her fame and wealth and subsequently allowed her to write full-time, Rossner returned to her novel of conjoined twins. Published in 1977 by Simon & Schuster, Attachments tells the story of Nadine and Dianne, friends who together marry twins Amos and Eddie. A novel not just about Siamese twins but a host of human attachments, it was only a modest best seller, but reviews were laudatory. Hailed by Jerome Charyn in The New York Times as "a lovely, bitter, frightening book," it was also described as "... an ambitious, disturbing novel by a bestselling author who might have written a trashy book, but decided instead to mess up our minds."

In 1979, Rossner married journalist Mordecai Persky (born 1931); the couple divorced in 1983.

Rossner followed Attachments with Emmeline (Simon & Schuster, 1980). Set in 1839—Rossner's only novel with a noncontemporary setting—the book was based on the life of a historical Maine woman, Emmeline Mosher, who at 14 is sent from her home to take a job in a textile mill in order to support her impoverished family. The book received predominately favorable notices, although Rossner was "humiliated" by a scathing review by Julian Moynahan in The New York Times, and believed that it hurt the book's commercial prospects (conversely, Christopher Lehmann-Haupt, also in the Times, gave the book high praise, stating that "[Rossner] inspires a renewed respect for the complexities of skillful story-telling.") Emmeline was adapted as an opera, composed by Tobias Picker with libretto by poet J.D. McClatchy. It premiered in 1996 at the Santa Fe Opera, and has been produced several times by other companies, including the New York City Opera in 1998. A recording of the original Santa Fe production was released in 1996 and a performance was aired on PBS as part of its series of Great Performances in 1997.

August (Houghton Mifflin), Rossner's most successful novel following Goodbar, was published in 1983 to critical acclaim. This story of 18-year-old Dawn Henley who undergoes psychoanalysis with Dr. Lulu Shinefeld, who has issues of her own, was a significant best seller, spending 19 weeks on the New York Times list. On page one of The New York Times Book Review, Walter Kendrick wrote, "I know of no other account, imagined or factual, that gives such a vivid picture of the analytic experience, on both sides of its intense, troubled, ambiguous relationship."

After publication of August, Rossner became seriously ill with viral encephalitis. Diagnosis had been delayed: Rossner's mother had committed suicide, and Rossner thought initially that her symptoms were psychosomatic. She suffered short-term memory loss, being unable to write for several years; the devastating illness also left her with diabetes.

== Life and career, 1990–1997 ==
Rossner's eighth novel, written during her long recuperation, was His Little Women (Summit Books), a modern retelling of the Louisa May Alcott classic, which was published in 1990 to mixed reviews. (Note: Despite its critical reception, His Little Women merits discussion; see especially Contemporary Reconfigurations of American Literary Classics: The Origin and Evolution of American Stories, by Betina Entzminger (Routledge, 2013), pp. 86–89.) Some suggested that Rossner had "lost her touch," neglecting to take into the account the difficulties she had encountered during its writing as she battled her illness. Although The New York Times found the novel "energetic, ambitious and funny...," many agreed with the verdict of Publishers Weekly: "Laboriously contrived, rambling and lacking momentum... it will disappoint fans of the author who expect better."

Rossner's critical reputation was restored with Olivia (or, The Weight of the Past) (Crown), published in 1994. It's the story of a chef and cooking teacher and her difficult relationship with her resentful daughter. Publishers Weekly, in its review, found Rossner to be "in top form," stating that "Anyone who likes to eat, cook or read about food will savor Rossner's descriptions of tasty dishes and culinary lore, conveyed with gusto and sensuous detail." The Los Angeles Times noted that Olivia is "a remarkable exploration of the intimate, complex connections between food and emotion...."

Rossner published her last novel, Perfidia (Nan A. Talese/Doubleday), in 1997 to extraordinary reviews. Perfidia (which means "treachery" in Spanish) was, like Looking for Mr. Goodbar, inspired by a real-life murder. A "chilling" story of an abusive mother and the daughter who kills her, the novel is "a scorching portrait of attachment and loss." Hailed as "[r]elentless, suspenseful, and absolutely captivating," Perfidia is a novel which "burns hypnotically."

== Marriage ==
In 2002, Rossner married educational publisher Stanley Leff, with whom she had begun a relationship in 1985.

== Death ==
Rossner died from complications of diabetes and leukemia on August 9, 2005, at New York University Medical Center in Manhattan. She was 70. She was survived by her husband, two children, her sister, and three grandchildren. Her papers are held at the Mugar Memorial Library of Boston University.

== Books ==
=== Novels ===
- To the Precipice (William Morrow, 1966)
- Nine Months in the Life of an Old Maid (Dial, 1969)
- Any Minute I Can Split (McGraw-Hill, 1972)
- Looking for Mr. Goodbar (Simon & Schuster, 1975)
- Attachments (Simon & Schuster, 1977)
- Emmeline (Simon & Schuster, 1980)
- August (Houghton Mifflin, 1983)
- His Little Women (Summit, 1990)
- Olivia (or, The Weight of the Past) (Crown, 1994)
- Perfidia (Nan A. Talese/Doubleday, 1997)

As of January 2017, all of Rossner's novels are available as ebooks.

=== Juvenile ===
- What Kind of Feet Does a Bear Have? (Illustrations by Irwin Rosenhouse) (1963)
