= The Call of the U.S.A. =

Song
- Published: 1918
- Released: 1918
- Songwriter(s): John J. Donahue

The Call of the U.S.A. is a World War I era song released in 1918. Lyrics and music were written by John J. Donahue. The song was published in Lawrence, Massachusetts by Donahue. On the cover of the sheet music, there is an officer riding on horseback, alongside marching soldiers. The sheet music can be found at the Library of Congress and Pritzker Military Museum & Library.
