= Charles Yale Harrison =

American author and journalist (1889–1954)

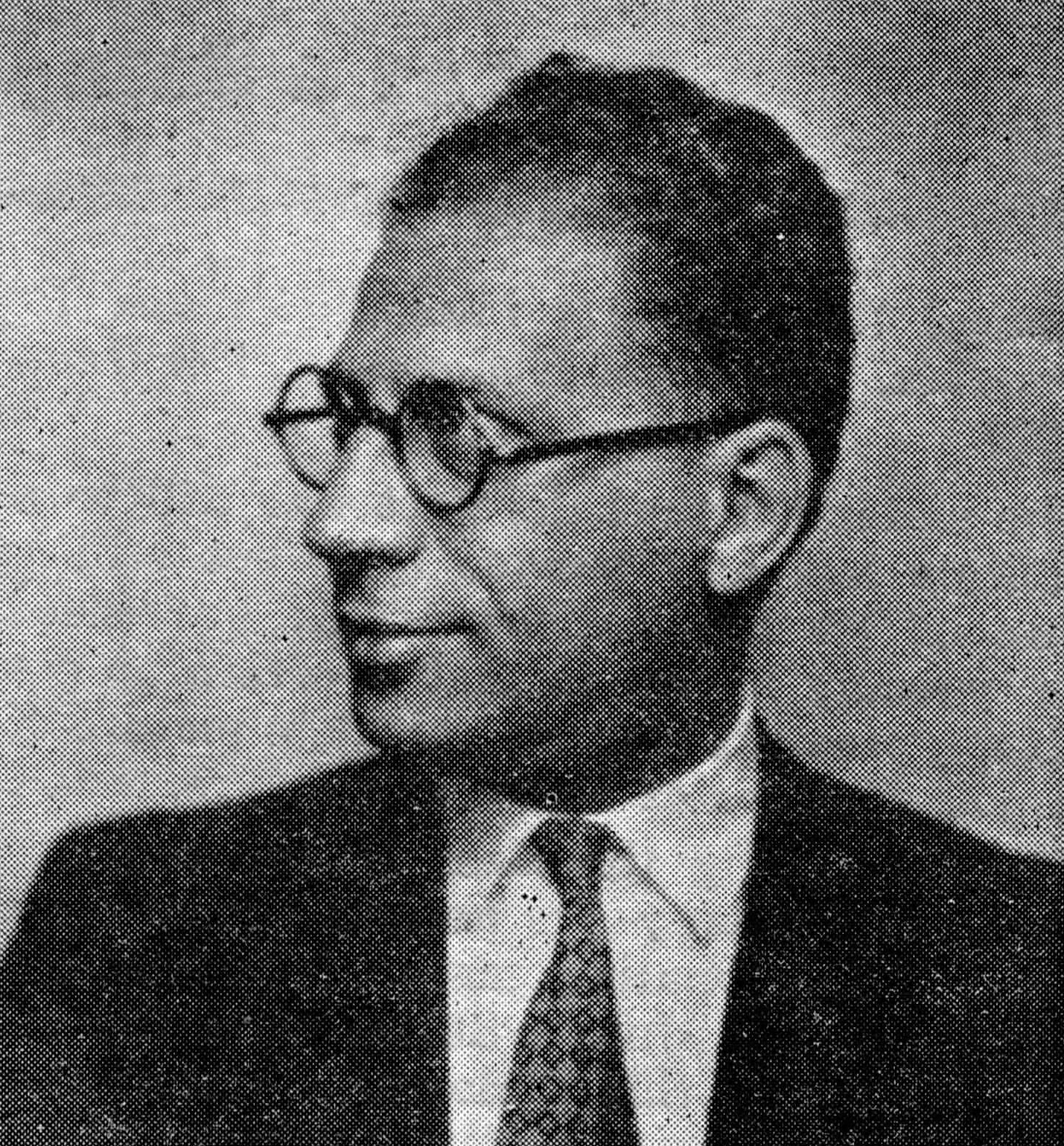
Harrison c. 1929

Charles Yale Harrison (16 June 1898 – 17 March 1954) was a Canadian-American writer and journalist, best known for his 1930 anti-war novella Generals Die in Bed.

== Background ==
Charles Yale Harrison was born in 1898 in Philadelphia and was raised in Montreal, Quebec, where at age 15 he wrote his first short story.

== Career ==
At age sixteen he took an entry-level job with the Montreal Star newspaper. Harrison's journalistic career was pre-empted, however, when he enlisted with the 244th Overseas Battalion of the Canadian Expeditionary Force in 1917 to fight in World War I. After several months in a reserve battalion in England, Harrison transferred to the Royal Montreal Regiment and was sent to the Western Front.

The climax of Harrison's war experience came on 8 August 1918 when he participated in the first day of the Battle of Amiens. Harrison was wounded in the foot and spent the rest of the war recuperating, before returning to Montreal. During the 1920s, Harrison managed a movie theatre before moving to New York City to pursue a career as a novelist, journalist, and public relations consultant. By 1928, serialized portions of Generals Die in Bed began to appear in several American and German periodicals. The same year, Harrison made headlines in The New York Times when he was arrested en route to Nicaragua, where he planned to interview the Nicaraguan dissident General Augusto César Sandino. He was held for questioning for three days on his steamship in Honduras, before being sent back to the United States.

In the early 1930s, Harrison was an editor of the New Masses communist literary magazine in New York City while under editor-in-chief Walt Carmon. In 1933, following the suicide of Trotsky's daughter Zinaida, Harrison broke with the Communist Party and became a Trotskyist sympathizer. In 1936, Harrison traveled to Norway to interview Trotsky for a planned biography which was never completed.

In 1940, Harrison accused Joseph Curran of membership in the Communist Party, based on dues and financial receipts signed by Curran to the Party.

== Literary career ==
In 1930, after such anti-war books as Robert Graves's Goodbye to All That, Ernest Hemingway's A Farewell to Arms, and Erich Maria Remarque's All Quiet on the Western Front (all published in 1929) became bestsellers, publishers took an interest in Generals Die in Bed, many elements of which resembled the other books. Harrison, who was working as a copy editor on the Bronx Home News was propelled into the spotlight when Generals Die in Bed became an international bestseller, in part due to the controversy surrounding its depiction of Canadian soldiers looting the French town of Arras and shooting unarmed German soldiers.

Although he went on to publish several more novels, none of them matched the commercial success of Generals Die in Bed. More successful were his non-fiction writings, including a 1931 biography of lawyer Clarence Darrow and a 1949 memoir entitled Thank God For My Heart Attack, an early installment in the genre of self-help books.

Harrison's next novel, Meet Me on the Barricades, was a satirical look at the Spanish Civil War and its Communist supporters in America. Although the 1937 book is written in a lighter tone than Generals Die in Bed, it still contains "moments when satire gives way to something unfunny, and Harrison’s anti-war commitments come to the foreground."

Harrison's last novel, Nobody's Fool, a humorous look at the public relations industry, was published in 1948. Harrison's archive at Columbia University contains the manuscript of No Season to Weep, an unpublished 1941 novel that follows a journalist haunted by his experiences in the Spanish Civil War.

== Personal life and death ==
Harrison married three times; he was widowed in 1931, later remarried and divorced his second wife, and was survived by his third wife at his death. He was an uncle of novelist Judith Rossner, author of Looking for Mr. Goodbar.

Suffering from the heart condition that inspired his self-help memoir, he died in 1954.

== Legacy ==
Columbia University has an archive of Harrison's papers, which include correspondence with: Whittaker Chambers, Clarence Darrow, Ruby Darrow, John Dos Passos, Max Eastman, Joseph Freeman, Mike Gold, Upton Sinclair, and Robert F. Wagner.

== Works ==
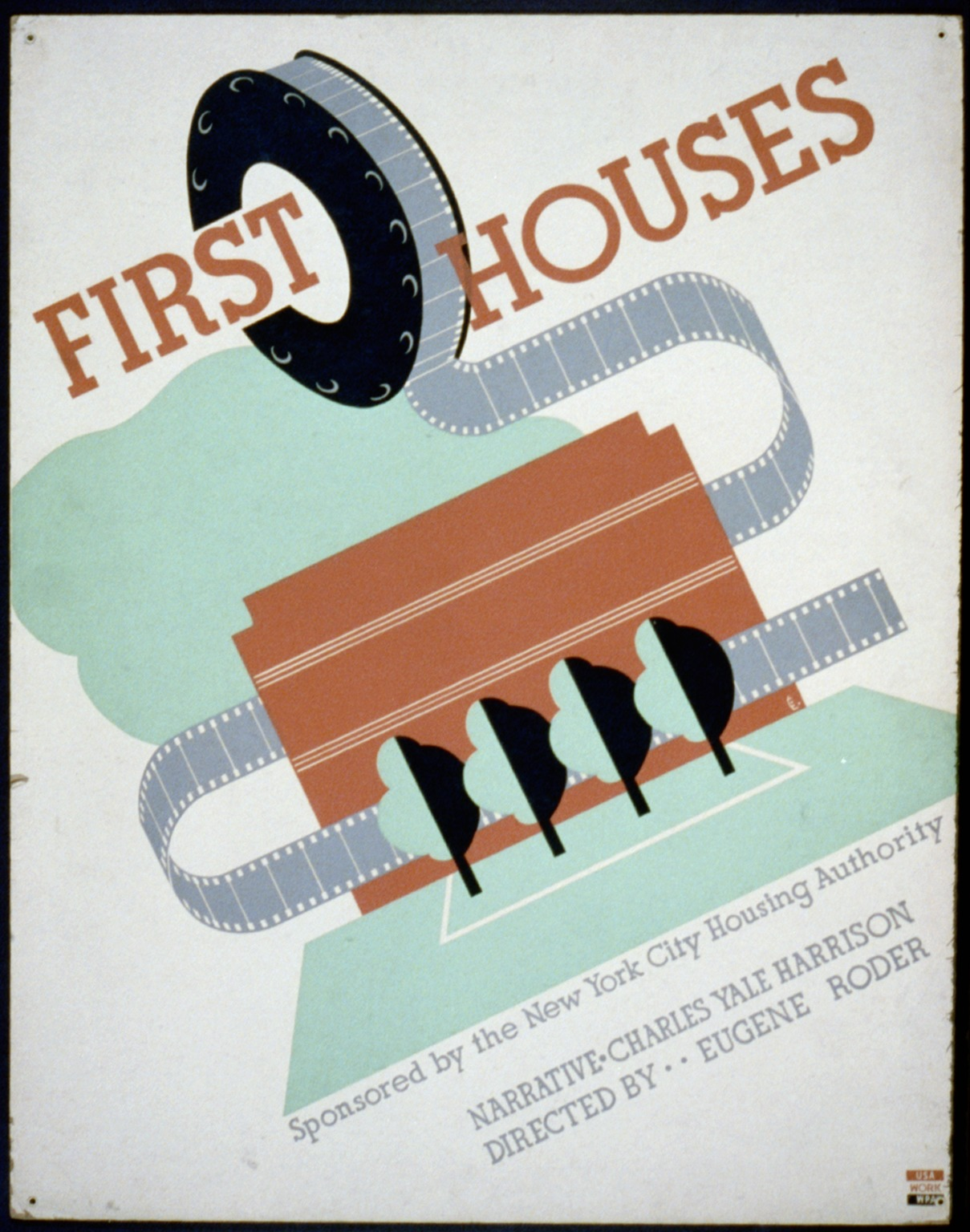
Poster for the WPA film First Houses (1936) for the New York City Housing Authority, with narrative by Charles Yale Harrison

=== Fiction ===
- Generals Die in Bed (1930)
- A Child is Born (1931)
- There Are Victories (1933)
- Meet Me on the Barricades (1937)
- Nobody's Fool (1948)

=== Non-fiction ===
- Next Please: The Story of Greco and Carillo (political pamphlet, 1927)
- Clarence Darrow (biography, 1931)
- Public Housing (series of pamphlets, 1937)
- Labor Lawyer (ghostwritten autobiography of Louis Waldman, 1944)
- Thank God For My Heart Attack (self-help, 1949)
