= The General (Forester novel) =

1936 novel by C. S. Forester

- Hardcover image of the initial U.K. edition
- Author: C. S. Forester
- Language: English
- Publisher: Michael Joseph (UK); Little, Brown, and Company (US)
- Publication place: United Kingdom

The General is a 1936 novel by writer C. S. Forester. In it, Forester described the British Army's experience of the trench warfare of the First World War on the Western Front from the perspective of a general.

The General follows the career of a professional soldier, Herbert Curzon, from his service as a junior officer in the Second Boer War through his experiences as a senior commander in the First World War. While personally courageous and dedicated, Curzon is otherwise unexceptional: he serves as an officer like many others. Despite accomplishing little militarily, he is repeatedly promoted and eventually finds himself commanding more men than did Marlborough or Wellington. His troops are overrun by new German tactics in the 1918 Central Powers offensive. While without truly great fault, Curzon's lack of imagination psychological foresight, technical education and imagination leave him inequipped to innovate, think creatively or respond to unforeseen military challenges.

Reviewers have lauded the work over multiple decades. Commentators have particular cited the ordinariness of Forester's character, which as a story element serves to give the novel power. More recent praise includes the writings of historian Max Hastings.

== Plot ==
=== Overall story framework ===
In August 1914, Curzon holds the rank of senior major in the 22nd Lancers. During the Boer War he won distinction in a cavalry charge, but his career since has been one of peacetime routine.

Upon the outbreak of the Great War, Curzon is given a temporary promotion to battalion command. At the Battle of Ypres, he keeps his head and following the death of his brigadier assumes command of the brigade. He returns to England while his unit is in Belgium and is rapidly promoted though chance and political intrigue. Incorrectly assumed to be of the society Curzons, he makes a socially advantageous marriage to Lady Emily, the daughter of the Duke of Bude, which gives him a useful political connection to the opposition "Bude House" set.

Curzon is next appointed to command the 10,000-man (fictional) 91st Infantry Division, ordering human-wave attacks that condemn many of them to mutilation and death by shells, gas and machine-guns. At the end, the 91st Division, which he has brought to a high degree of efficiency, crumbles before the March 1918 German offensive. Faithful to his own traditional values, Curzon decides to "go up the line" among his troops on his horse with a sword rather than face defeat and professional failure. The novel implies that he seeks death in battle; he says "We can still go down fighting". He is injured by a shell fragment, endures months of drugged agony and loses a leg. His war is over.

=== Psyche of the main character ===
Curzon – General Sir Herbert Curzon by this time – is not a brutal man or an uncaring one: simply a brave and honest but stubborn and unimaginative leader. Curzon's almost inevitable rise to high command, the senseless slaughter he oversees and his eventual retirement to the life of an invalid follow from the attitudes and mores of the British Army and of British ruling society more generally: the unimaginative and inflexible mindset that (in Forester's view) contributed to the appalling casualties and the horrors of the First World War.

Curzon distrusts theorists, and is not part of the "blood-brotherhood of Camberley" (the staff college) Like his seniors he believes in "Attrition" and the "Big Push" with brute force; more men, more guns. Hence he is startled by the tank victory at Cambrai.

=== War Office and political machinations ===
The novel has an episode in the War Office with a field-marshal, a general and a major-general agreeing to promote Curzon, which is not due to any scheming but because though there were a hundred possible officers "an adventitious circumstance had singled him out for particular notice". Major-General Mackenzie laments, "Where am I to get three hundred good brigadiers from?". The field-marshal (who is constructing a "modern army" out of the remains of the Expeditionary Force that Curzon was in) has Curzon promoted to major-general so he outranks Webb, as Curzon was junior to Webb when a brigadier-general. Curzon later has to "unstick" (send home) Webb when he wants to "adjust" (withdraw) his line. Eventually Curzon has command of four divisions or a hundred thousand men: "as many as Wellington or Marlborough ever commanded."

At the outbreak of war, "someone in London had done his work extraordinarily well to put an Army” (the British Expeditionary Force) ashore lacking absolutely nothing. Curzon is promoted to (temporary) lieutenant-colonel as a "vigorous younger man" to replace his predecessor, who is near retirement and is given an (unwelcome) promotion to train a brigade of yeomanry. But with the Ninety-first division, one of the new armies, "the War Office was found wanting … they were left unclothed, unhoused and unarmed (and) shivered in tents pitched in seas of mud". Curzon induces Mackenzie to wangle allocations of duckboards and other equipment to make his soldiers' life under canvas bearable by saying he was dining with influential people (he was dining with Emily).

Mackenzie is the Director-General of Tactical Services, and when the Liberal Government admitted some of the Opposition to government: "while men in high position fell right and left, General Mackenzie remained Director-General of Tactical Services. Others greater than he – among them the greatest Minister of War that England ever had – were flung out of office, but Mackenzie remained despite his very unsound attitude in the Ulster crisis. Perhaps that is the most important contribution Curzon ever made to the history of England." Curzon, one of whose traits is personal loyalty, had urged his father-in-law the Duke to keep Mackenzie.

The unnamed Minister of War was Sirdar of the Egyptian Army when he was forty-one (Curzon's age), so is similar to Kitchener. Forced from office - rather than, like Kitchener, drowned at sea - he is replaced by another cavalryman, Scottish instead of Irish, named as Haig.

== Reception and effect of the novel ==
The General has been widely praised as being an excellent and realistic account of the mindset of the British Officer Corps in times of war and as such many veterans are surprised to learn that the author himself never actually served in the armed forces. In fact, a persistent yet unsubstantiated rumor states that Adolf Hitler was so impressed with the novel that he made it required reading for his top field commanders and general staff, in the hopes that it would enable prominent German officers to understand how their British counterparts thought. This rumor is referred to as fact by Forester in a foreword to a later edition of the novel.

Historian Max Hastings, in his book Catastrophe 1914: Europe Goes to War, calls The General "brilliantly contemptuous", and writes that "[Forester] likened the commanders of World War I to savages, striving to extract a screw from a piece of timber by main force, assisted by ever more fulcrums and levers" failing to grasp that simply twisting the screw would remove it "with a fraction of the effort." Hastings remarks:

This view of wartime generalship, which was essentially also that of Churchill and Lloyd George, has commanded widespread favour ever since. But what if, as most scholars of the conflict today believe, it was impossible to 'turn the screw', to identify any credible means for breaking the stalemate?

== See also ==
- Historical fiction
- World War I in popular culture
