= Emmeline (opera) =

Opera by Tobias Picker

- Opera by Tobias Picker
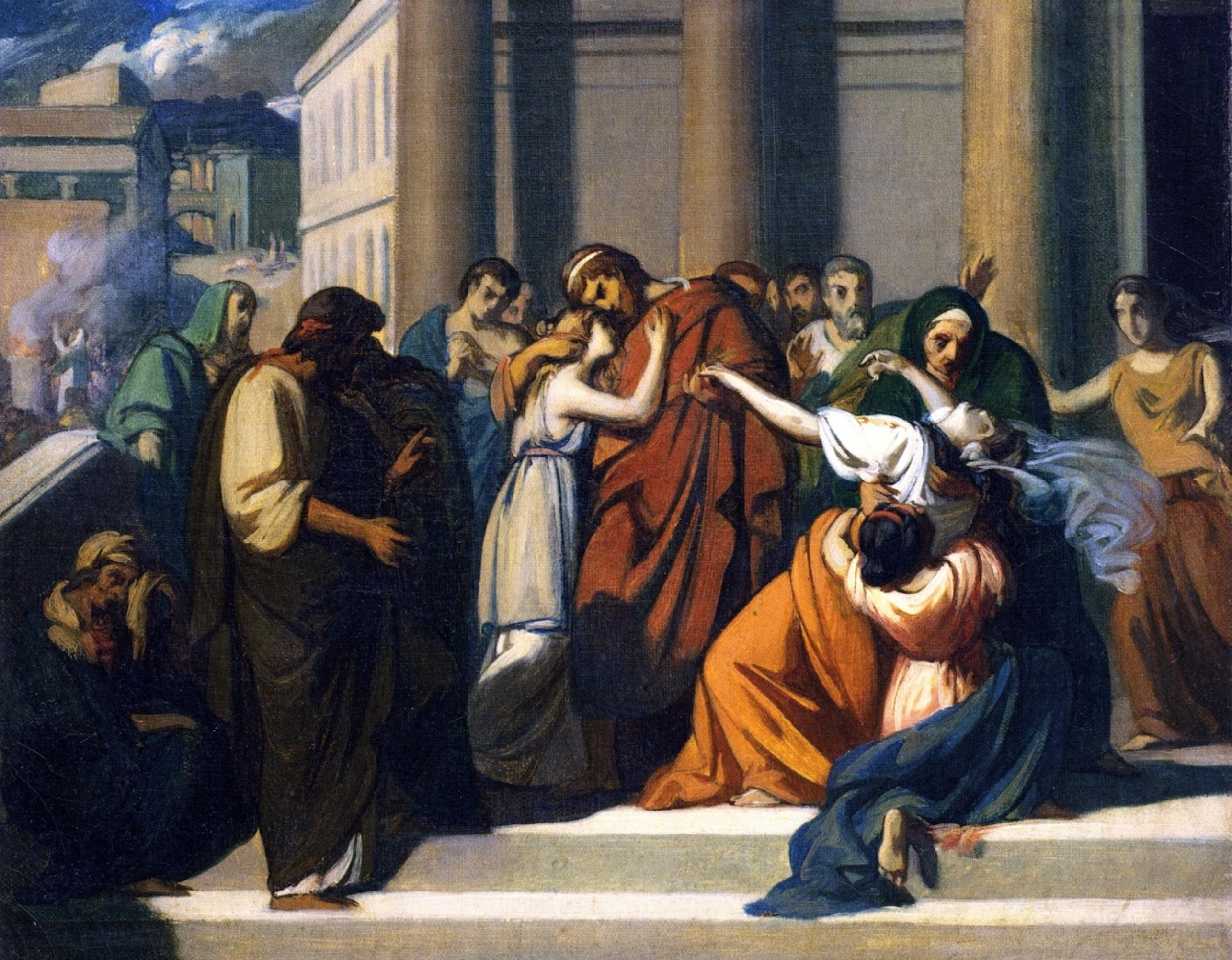
- Cabanel's Oedipus Separating from Jocasta
- Librettist: J. D. McClatchy
- Language: English
- Based on: Judith Rossner's Emmeline
- Premiere: 1996; Santa Fe Opera

Emmeline is an opera in two acts composed by American Tobias Picker with a libretto by J. D. McClatchy. Picker's first opera, it was commissioned by the Santa Fe Opera company and premiered in 1996. Based on Judith Rossner's novel of the same name, Emmeline is an American retelling of the Oedipus myth from the mother’s viewpoint.

In 2009, a chamber version of Emmeline was created for the Dicapo Opera. In 2015, Opera Theatre of Saint Louis mounted a major new production of Emmeline that won universal acclaim.

== Roles ==
Role	Voice	Premiere Cast, 1996 (Conductor: George Manahan)
Emmeline Mosher	soprano	Patricia Racette
Matthew Gurney, a railroad worker	tenor	Curt Peterson
Mr. Maguire, factory supervisor	baritone	Victor Ledbetter
Aunt Hannah Watkins, Henry Mosher's sister	dramatic contralto	Anne-Marie Owens
Henry Mosher, Emmeline's father	bass	Kevin Langan
Mrs. Bass, owner of the boarding house	mezzo-soprano	Josepha Gayer
Sophie, older girl at the mill	soprano	Melanie Sarakatsannis
Pastor Avery, pastor in Fayette, Maine	bass	Herbert Perry
Hooker, foreman at the mill	tenor	Wright Moore
Harriet Mosher, Emmeline's sister	soprano	Michelle Bradley
Simon Fenton, Emmeline's suitor	baritone	Gregory Keil
Ella Burling, girl at the mill	soprano	Mary Jane Kania

== Synopsis ==
In Act I, the Mosher family in Maine has just finished burying another child. Emmeline's Aunt Hannah convinces her father to send 14-year-old Emmeline to work in a Lowell, Massachusetts textile mill so that she can send money back to the family to help them survive. Many of the mill girls live in a boarding house directed by Mrs. Bass, who leads them in prayers and tries to promote their good behavior. Emmeline is seduced by Mr. Maguire, a handsome Irish immigrant and factory supervisor who is married to the mill owner's daughter. When Emmeline is discovered to be pregnant, she is expelled from the mill and sent back to her aunt. Hannah helps Emmeline conceal her pregnancy from her parents, and arranges for a couple to adopt her baby to raise as their own. She does not allow Emmeline to see the baby or even tell her its sex, believing the less her niece knows, the easier it will be for her to give up the baby in her heart.

In Act II, twenty years have passed and Emmeline is unmarried, living with and caring for her parents. She has rejected all suitors because of her hidden past and shame, saying "marriage is not for the likes of me." Matthew Gurney, a young railroad worker from Kansas and new boarder, comes to live at the house. They share an immediate attraction, and Emmeline helps Matthew to learn to read better. After several months, when Matthew's job presses him to move on, he says that he wants to stay and marry Emmeline. Emmeline's father objects because of Matthew's younger age, but Emmeline accepts his proposal.

The couple marry and Matthew starts building a house for them. Emmeline's mother dies and Aunt Hannah returns to town for the funeral. When she is introduced to Matthew, she recognizes his name and asks questions about "his folks" and where he is from. She realizes that he is Emmeline's son and reveals it before the funeral crowd, to everyone's shock and dismay. Matthew runs away after the secret is revealed, but Emmeline refuses to leave town. Saying that she is waiting for her child, she remains alone in her and Matthew's unfinished house.

== Production history ==
- 1996, Santa Fe Opera
- 1998, New York City Opera
- 2009, Dicapo Opera Theater (New York)
- 2010, Cinnabar Theater (Petaluma, CA)
- 2015, Saint Louis Opera Theater (first full-scale production since 1996 premiere)
- 2017, Boston University Theatre (Boston, MA)
- 2019, Manhattan School of Music (New York, NY)

== Reception ==
The Santa Fe premiere was critically praised and a recording by the original cast was released in 1996. The debut production was nationally broadcast on PBS in 1997.

In a review of a 1998 New York City Opera production, the New York Times wrote,

"An admirable sense of self results in affecting simplicity. ... It is a model of its kind." The reviewer writes further, "Mr. Picker has a true ear for lyrical run-on musical sentences. They ride gracefully and take interesting directions. The language is tonal, and Mr. Tobias's particular dialect has a soothing effect. Dissonance seems to be more a theatrical than a musical tool."

Steve Smith wrote a review of a 2009 production by Dicapo Opera Theater in a "slimmed-down version" provided by the composer in New York:

"Mr. Picker effectively expresses character nuances and plot twists with powerfully direct vocal lines. His potent orchestral writing evokes atmosphere, underlines conflict and conveys emotional tone with an emphatic directness. Mr. Picker’s musical vocabulary is unapologetically conservative but never merely decorative, trivial or dull"

In 2015, Opera Theatre of Saint Louis mounted a major new production of his Emmeline that won universal acclaim from The Wall Street Journal, the Dallas News, and Saint Louis Today respectively:

"one of the best operas written in the past twenty-five years"

“a work of gripping emotional intensity and extraordinary musical expressivity”

“the greatest American opera of the 20th century"

== Recording ==
Tobias Picker: Emmeline (Patricia Racette, Anne-Marie Owens, Curt Peterson, Victor Ledbetter et al.; Santa Fe Opera; Conductor: George Manahan, 1996). Albany Records 284/85

== Sources ==
- Steve Behrens, "Tragic legend returns to public TV, retold this time as an opera", Current, July 22, 1996. Accessed 8 January 2008.
- Holland, Bernard (April 2, 1998). "Exploring The Heart Of Lyrical Americana". The New York Times.
