= Generals Die in Bed =

1930 novel by Charles Yale Harrison

- First edition, cover art by Wenck
- Author: Charles Yale Harrison
- Language: English
- Publication date: 1930

Generals Die in Bed is an anti-war novella by the Canadian writer Charles Yale Harrison. Based on the author's own experiences in combat, it tells the story of a young soldier fighting in the trenches of World War I. It was first published in 1930 by William Morrow.

== Plot summary ==
This Canadian World War I narrative begins in Montreal, where an unnamed young soldier is among Canadian troops of a variety of ages preparing to deploy to France and the war. The story follows the soldiers into the Western Front trench lines where they begin to experience the war of attrition being fought there.

While he once thought of war as glorious, the narrator faces the reality of hard combat and his friends begin to die. Later, the narrator finds himself deeply disturbed when he bayonets a German soldier during a raid; this trauma is magnified by the narrator's subsequent camaraderie with the brother of the soldier he killed when together they endure shelling.

The narrator becomes further affected by the death of another friend; it is at this point he begins to become exhausted by the horrors of war. He goes on his leave to England, a 10-day period during which a prostitute does everything in her power to help him forget the war. However, everyday incidents – such as a burlesque show that marginalizes the cost of war by adapting the imagery of war for public amusement – remind the anonymous soldier of the separation between the "home front" and the trenches.

Upon his return to the trenches, the Canadians suffered heavy losses in a trench raid; at this point, Broadbent was the lone survivor of the narrator's friends. To motivate the troops for an offensive, a senior officer told the troops of the Germans sinking a hospital ship; during this bloody confrontation, the narrator received a wound, and Broadbent dies after his leg was nearly severed from his body. The narrator's wound takes him out of action, although the war continued. At this point, the soldiers learn that the ship sunk by the Germans was, in fact, carrying weapons. The illumination of the truth brought with it the realization that war was a game of strategy fought between generals, and soldiers are the ones who suffer.

== Style and themes ==
The novel focuses heavily on the vanity of war and how many of the soldiers were naive, fighting for ideals. Generals and civilians spew patriotic slogans without ever truly understanding the horror of trench life. Like the poetry of Wilfred Owen and Siegfried Sassoon, or such European novels as Henri Barbusse's Under Fire, or Erich Maria Remarque's All Quiet on the Western Front, Generals Die in Bed attempts to strip war of its romance and glamour, to show the real experiences of men at war.

The story possesses a unique style in that we learn next to nothing about its main character and first person narrator. Therefore, it could be argued that his function is merely to serve as a surrogate for the audience.

== Literary significance and criticism ==
Generals Die in Bed was an international bestseller upon its release, and was by far the most successful of Harrison's novels. The New York Evening Standard called it "the best of the war books". The reception was lukewarm in Canada, however, because of scenes depicting Canadian soldiers looting the French town of Arras and shooting unarmed Germans (which amounted to a war crime). There is no evidence to support Harrison's claim that the 14th Battalion Royal Montreal Regiment fired upon unarmed German soldiers, beyond his own claims, and, further, the regiment's diaries directly contradict this claim. There was also no evidence that the medical ship in question, the HMHS Llandovery Castle, was carrying anything other than medical supplies and wounded soldiers. Additionally, in one passage in the chapter entitled Vengeance, the narrator claims that the faces of the soldiers are "as red as the poppies of which the war-poets are writing about back home." This is a reference to In Flanders Fields, which was written by Lieutenant Colonel John McCrae. John McCrae was a surgeon in the Canadian Army, and participated in the Second Battle of Ypres. These falsehoods served to incense the general Canadian public, especially the remaining veterans of the 14th Regiment. It was also noted by several parties that, contrary to the title's claim, more than 200 British generals of the First World War were killed, captured or wounded on the front lines. Many felt that the title dishonored their memory.

Former Canadian Expeditionary Force commander General Sir Arthur Currie, said that the novel denigrated the legacy of Canadians in the war. Harrison denied the allegation in a 1930 interview with the Toronto Daily Star, praising Canadian soldiers and justifying his novel as an attempt to depict the war "as it really was." There is a strong likelihood that Remarque's 'All Quiet on the Western Front' plagiarized sections of 'Generals Die in Bed', notably the bayoneting scene.

After its initial success as part of the "war book boom" of the late 1920s and early 1930s, Generals Die in Bed was largely forgotten, until the Hamilton, Ontario publisher Potlach Publications reissued it in the 1970s. In 2002, Toronto's Annick Press re-issued the original text of Generals Die in Bed packaged for young adults, and further editions by Penguin Books Australia and Red Fox in the UK followed. In 2007, Annick republished an edition intended for adult readers and course adoptions. The text generally states the horrific nature of World War I.

Generals Die in Bed is referenced briefly in the short story "A Natural History of the Dead" by Ernest Hemingway, primarily as a satirical commentary on its title.

== See also ==
- Battle of Amiens
- Canadian literature
- War novel
