= August (Rossner novel) =

1983 novel by Judith Rossner

- First edition
- Author: Judith Rossner
- Cover artist: Fred Marcellino
- Language: English
- Publisher: Houghton Mifflin
- Publication date: 1983
- Publication place: United States
- Media type: Print (Cloth, Paper)
- Pages: 376 (Cloth)

August, is a novel written by Judith Rossner focused on a psychoanalyst and one of her analysands. The title refers to the month of August, when analysts leave the city for the month and thus leave some of their patients without the emotional support of the analytic relationship.

== Plot introduction ==
The novel focuses on the relationship between a psychoanalyst, Dr. Lulu Shinefield, and a troubled young woman, Dawn Henley, from the beginning of their therapy together through to its termination.

== Characters ==
- Lulu Kagan Shinefield: Main character and psychoanalyst which the book centers on
- Anita Kagan: Lulu's mother
- George Kagan: Lulu's father
- Luther "Woody" Samuelson: Lulu's first husband
- Sascha Shinefield: Lulu's daughter by her first husband
- Nathan Shinefield: Lulu's second husband
- Teddy Shinefield: Lulu's son by her second husband
- Walden Shinefield: Lulu's son by her second husband
- Bonnie and Duke Mayer: Friends of Lulu's and fellow analysts
- Dawn Henley: The other main character of the novel and Dr. Shinefield's analysand
- Vera Henley: Dawn's adoptive "father", but actually her aunt
- Tony Lubovitz: Dawn's adoptive "mother" and partner to Vera prior to separation
- Leonard Silverstein: Tony's husband following her separation from Vera
- Gordon Henley: Dawn's biological father
- Gregory Barnes: Gordon's homosexual partner
- Miranda Lewis Henley: Dawn's biological mother
- Nell Lewis: Miranda's sister
- Mavis McLeod Hagerty: First housekeeper and sitter for Dawn following her mother's death
- Caitlin Hagerty: Second housekeeper and sitter for Dawn as an infant, and cousin to Mavis
- Dr. Leif Seaver: Dawn's former analyst
- Alan Gartner: Dawn's early boyfriend and biological father of her aborted child
- Rob Grace: Another boyfriend of Dawn's
- Tom Grace: Another of Dawn's lovers, and father to Rob Grace
- Bill Denton: Another boyfriend of Dawn's
- Jack Stewart: Final boyfriend of Dawn's mentioned in the novel
- Polly Campbell, Lillian, Jessica Rubenstein, Sandy: Friends of Dawn's

== Reception ==
The New York Times reviewer Walter Kendrick praised the book for "almost photographic realism" in showing life on Manhattan's Upper West Side and in East Hampton, as well as its depiction of the relationship between analyst and patient. The reviewer concluded, "I know of no other account, imagined or factual, that gives such a vivid picture of the analytic experience, on both sides of its intense, troubled, ambiguous relationship." Norman N. Holland, in his 1990 Holland's Guide to Psychoanalytic Psychology and Literature-and-Psychology, wrote that August, though a "pop novel", provided an "accurate picture of a New York psychoanalysis today" and "a fascinating study of separation anxiety". UPI reviewer David R. Schweisberg likewise credited the book's writing and its portrayal of psychology, but he felt that Rossner had pursued "realism and nuance at the expense of leaving the reader behind", making the book "boring".
