= Guerilla Opera =

Opera company, Boston, MA, US (founded 2007)

- Type: Opera company
- Genre: Opera
- Headquarters: Boston, MA
- Website: https://guerillaopera.org/

Guerilla Opera is an opera company in Boston, Massachusetts founded in 2007 specializing in accessible contemporary chamber operas, several of which have been commissioned by the company. In 2010, its Artistic Directors were Mike Williams and Rudolf Rojahn, its General Manager was Aliana de la Guardia and its director of design and production was Julia Noulin-Mérat. Guerilla Opera performed in the Zack Box Theater at the Boston Conservatory, where it is a resident ensemble. As of 2018, its Artistic Directors are Julia Noulin-Mérat and Aliana de la Guardia. Guerilla Opera performs in Boston.

== Productions ==
Date	Production	Author	Director
2007	Heart of a Dog (adapted from the novella, Heart of a Dog by Mikhail Bulgakov)	Rudolf Rojahn	Copeland Woodruff
2008	No Exit (adapted from the play, No Exit, by Jean-Paul Sartre)	Andy Vores	
2008	We Are Sons (to an original libretto by Rojahn )	Rudolf Rojahn	Sally Stunkel
2009	Rumpelstiltskin (adapted from the Brothers Grimm story, Rumpelstiltskin)	Marti Epstein	Greg Smucker

- September 2009
  - Say It Ain't So, Joe by Curtis K. Hughes (adapted from public records of the 2008 United States vice-presidential debate)
  - directed by Nathan Troup
  - set design by Julia Noulin-Merat,
- September 2010
  - Heart of a Dog by Rudolf Rojahn (adapted from the novella by Mikhail Bulgakov)
  - directed by Copeland Woodruff
  - set design by Julia Noulin-Merat, lights by Tlaloc Lopez-Waterman, costumes by Neil Fortin
- September 2011
  - Loose, Wet, Perforated by Nicholas Vines
  - directed by Jeremy Bloom
  - set design by Julia Noulin-Merat, lights by Christopher Brusberg, costumes by Neil Fortin
- May 2012
  - Bovinus Rex by Rudolf Rojahn
  - directed by Copeland Woodruff
  - set design by Julia Noulin-Merat, lights by Tlaloc Lopez-Waterman, costumes by Neil Fortin
- May 2013
  - Giver of Light by Adam Roberts (libretto Adam Roberts)
  - directed by Andrew Eggert
  - set design by Julia Noulin-Merat, lights by Tlaloc Lopez-Waterman, costumes by Neil Fortin
- September 2014
  - No Exit by Andy Vores
  - directed by Nathan Troup
  - set design by Julia Noulin-Merat, lights by Daniel Chapman, costumes by Lara De Brujin
- May 2014
  - "Gallo" by Ken Ueno
  - directed by Sarah Meyers
  - set design by Julia Noulin-Merat, lights and video by Tlaloc Lopez-Waterman, costumes by Annie Simon
- September 2014
  - "Let's Make A Sandwich" two chamber operas
  - "Rarebit" by Curtis K. Hughes
  - Ouroboros by Rudolf Rojahn
  - directed by Copeland Woodruff and Giselle Ty
  - set design by Julia Noulin-Merat, lights and video by Tlaloc Lopez-Waterman, costumes by Neil Fortin
- May 2015
  - Pedr Solis by Per Bloland (libretto Paul Schick)
  - directed by Laine Rettmer
  - set design by Julia Noulin-Merat, lights by Daniel Chapman, costumes by Neil Fortin
- September 2015
  - Troubled Water by Mischa Salkind-Pearl (libretto Frederick Choi)
  - directed by Allegra Libonati
  - set design by Julia Noulin-Merat, lights by Daniel Chapman, costumes by Neil Fortin
- May 2016
  - Beowulf by Hannah Lash
  - directed by Andrew Eggert
  - set design by Julia Noulin-Merat, lights by Daniel Chapman, costumes by Neil Fortin
- October 2017
  - Loose, Wet, Perforated by Nicholas Vines
  - directed by Nichola O'Leary
  - set design by Julia Noulin-Merat, lights by Keithlyn Parkman.
- May 2019
  - Rumpelstiltskin by Marti Epstein
  - concert at the Opera America National Center, video animation by Deniz Khateri, lights by Keithlyn Parkman.

== Awards and recognition ==
2018- Opera America - Innovation Grant

2015- Arts Impulse - Best Opera Production "Gallo"

2015- Boston Classical Review - Best World Premiere :Troubled Water"

== See also ==
- Boston Lyric Opera
- Opera Boston
- Boston Opera Collaborative
- Opera Company of Boston
- Odyssey Opera
