= Salkind =

Salkind is a surname. Notable people with the surname include:

- Alexander Salkind (1921–1997), European film producer
- Alvin J. Salkind (1927–2015), American chemical engineer
- Ilya Salkind (born 1947), Mexican film and television producer
- Morton Salkind (1932–2014), American politician
- Mischa Salkind-Pearl, American composer, keyboardist and educator

== See also ==
- Salkin
