= Gil Rose =

American conductor

Gil Rose is the founder and conductor of the Boston Modern Orchestra Project (BMOP), founder and General-Artistic Director of Odyssey Opera, Artistic Director of Monadnock Music Festival, Professor of Practice at Northeastern University, and Executive Producer of the record label "BMOP/sound."

== Early life and education ==
Rose was born in Pittsburgh, Pennsylvania, and received his Bachelor of Music from the University of Cincinnati – College Conservatory of Music. He later studied at Carnegie Mellon University, where he received his Master of Fine Arts degree and Artist Diploma.

== Boston Modern Orchestra Project ==
Rose founded the Boston Modern Orchestra Project (BMOP) in 1996 and has since then served as the artistic director of a group lauded as "one of the country's leading contemporary music ensembles." Under Rose's leadership, BMOP has received two John S. Edwards Awards for Strongest Commitment to New American Music and has won eleven ASCAP awards for adventurous orchestral programming. In 2015 it was named Musical America's 2016 Ensemble of the Year. Composer John Harbison has said that "No other city has anything resembling BMOP — with that level of activity, with that sustained productivity ... There's really been no new-music organization with a wider range of inclusion." Paul Griffiths has also praised the ensemble, writing in The New York Times in 2000 that "Mr. Rose and his team filled the music with rich, decisive ensemble colors and magnificent solos ... These musicians were rapturous ... superb instrumentalists at work and play."

== Odyssey Opera ==
Rose founded Odyssey Opera in 2013 in order to bring audiences "on a journey, maybe to ports of call they haven't been to before"; the company has gained an "enthusiastic following" for its productions of rarely performed works under his artistic and musical direction – from large, grand concert operas to fully staged contemporary chamber operas. The inaugural season began with a performance of Wagner's Rienzi, while 2014 saw a "triumphal" concert performance (and Boston premiere) of Korngold's Die tote Stadt. In 2015 the group performed the "enthusiastically cheered" Boston premiere of Massenet's Le Cid under Rose's baton at the New England Conservatory of Music's Jordan Hall.

== Opera Boston ==
From 2003 to its closure in 2012, Rose served as the artistic director of Opera Boston. His performances with the ensemble included Verdi's Luisa Miller, Beethoven's Fidelio, John Adams's Nixon in China, Gluck's Alceste (featuring Dawn Upshaw), Shostakovich's The Nose, Weber's Der Freischütz, Smetana's The Bartered Bride, Rossini's Tancredi (featuring Ewa Podleś), and the world premiere of Madame White Snake (with music by Zhou Long).

== Other performances ==
Rose has curated the Fromm Concert Series at Harvard University and served as the Artistic Director of the 2008 Ditson Festival of Contemporary Music at the Institute of Contemporary Art, Boston. He also directed the Voice of America Festival, a six-concert, three-day event, featuring BMOP in partnership with the Florestan Recital Project and the Tufts University Department of Music.

Rose has also made numerous appearances as a guest conductor, including with the American Composers Orchestra, the Warsaw Philharmonic Orchestra, the National Symphony Orchestra of Ukraine, the Cleveland Chamber Symphony, the Orchestra della Svizzera Italiana and the National Orchestra of Porto, as well as several appearances with the Boston Symphony Chamber Players. He made his Tanglewood Music Festival debut in 2002 and in 2003 he debuted with the Netherlands Radio Symphony as part of the Holland Festival.

From 2003 to 2006, he was the artistic director of the Opera Unlimited Festival, a collaboration between BMOP and Opera Boston resulting in staged contemporary chamber operas. He led world premieres of Elena Ruehr's Toussaint Before the Spirits, the New England premiere of Thomas Adès's Powder Her Face, and John Harbison's Full Moon in March. In 2006 he conducted an acclaimed North American premiere of Peter Eötvös's Angels in America with Opera Unlimited.

As an educator, Rose was the director of Orchestral Activities at Tufts University for five years. In 2013, he joined the faculty of Northeastern University as a Professor of Practice of Music.

Rose conducted performances of Death and the Powers, an opera by Tod Machover featuring new performance technologies developed by the MIT Media Lab, in collaboration with the American Repertory Theater. The world premiere took place at the Grimaldi Forum Monaco in Monte Carlo, Monaco in September 2010. The North American premiere took place in Boston with the American Repertory Theater in 2011, followed by a performance at the Chicago Opera Theater later that year.

Rose serves as executive producer of BMOP/sound, a recipient of 2009, 2010, and 2011 Grammy Award nomations. He is also a recipient of an ASCAP Concert Music award and in 2007, received Columbia University's Ditson Conductor's Award for his commitment to the performance of American music. His recordings have appeared on the year-end "Best of" lists of The New York Times, Time Out New York, The Boston Globe, Chicago Tribune, American Record Guide, National Public Radio, and Downbeat Magazine.

== See also ==
- Boston Modern Orchestra Project
- Odyssey Opera
- Opera Boston
