= Opera Company of Boston =

US opera company

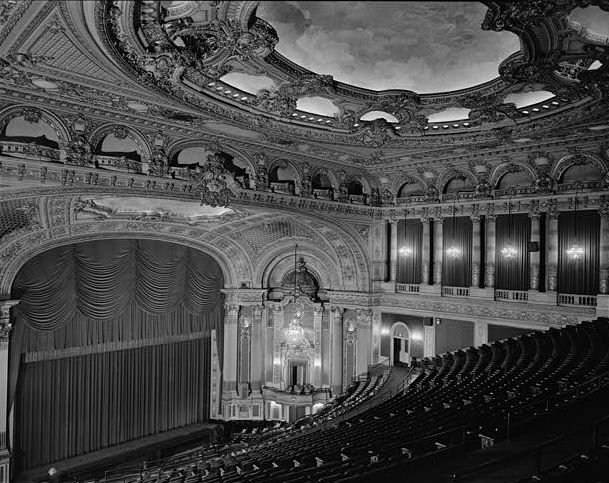
Boston Opera House, formerly the B. F. Keith Memorial Theatre, where the Opera Company of Boston performed from 1980 until 1990.

The Opera Company of Boston was an American opera company located in Boston, Massachusetts, that was active from the late 1950s through the 1980s. The company was founded by American conductor Sarah Caldwell in 1958 under the name Boston Opera Group.

At one time, the touring arm of the company was called Opera New England. Caldwell served as both director and conductor for most of the company's productions throughout its more than three decade-long history. Under her leadership, the company presented a repertoire of more than 75 operas that came from a wide array of musical periods and styles, including many works previously unheard in the United States, and a significant number of contemporary operas.

This focus on distinctive repertoire, along with Caldwell's innovative stage direction, garnered the group wide acclaim and earned it a place among the leading opera companies in the U.S. In 1990, after 32 seasons, the company was forced to close due to financial difficulties.

== History ==
=== Origins ===
In 1958, Sarah Caldwell and Linda Cabot Black, among others, started the Opera Company of Boston with just $5,000, beginning with a production of Jacques Offenbach's Voyage to the Moon that was presented on Boston Common with a cast that included Adelaide Bishop as Queen Popotte. Hailed by The Boston Globe as a masterful production, the company was invited to present the work on the lawn of the White House in a performance attended by President Dwight D. Eisenhower. On the heels of this success, Caldwell decided to stage a production of Puccini's La bohème.

=== 1958–1979 ===
At this point the opera company did not have a home theatre. The fifty-year-old Boston Opera House had been in disuse for a long time and was torn down just months before Caldwell founded her company. Caldwell eventually settled on renting the Donnelly Theater for the company's performance of La bohème, and that theatre became the company's performance venue until it was torn down ten years later in 1968.

After 1968 the company spent the next seven years looking for a stable performing venue and lived a nomadic existence, performing at various venues including the Shubert Theatre, MIT's Kresge Auditorium, the Cyclorama, and the Tufts University Field House. Finally in 1975 the company settled on renting the Orpheum Theatre where it held performances for the next five years.

=== 1980–1990 ===
Although the Orpheum Theater was adequate for the company's needs, Caldwell dreamed of having her own facility. In 1978 the company bought the B. F. Keith Memorial Theater, a former movie palace, on Washington Street in downtown Boston. The theater was acquired with the help of opera patron Susan Timken, the heiress to a prominent New England company fortune. At the time of its purchase, the theatre was run-down but had a lot of potential, being able to seat 2,500 people and possessing both good acoustics and opulent architecture. However, the stage was only 35 feet (11 m) deep, and therefore somewhat limiting. Further, a complete renovation of the theatre was impossible, as the company was not able to afford the expense of all the necessary repairs. Despite these problems, Caldwell pressed ahead and the company moved into their new home in 1980, rechristening the theatre the Boston Opera House. Eventually the cost of upkeep on the building proved to be too much as more and more things began to break down. The company could not afford to maintain the building and sold it after the 1989/1990 season to a Texas developer. Although the company still technically existed for another year, they never produced another opera after this point.

=== Legacy ===
Throughout its history an impressive roster of singers have performed with the Opera Company of Boston (OCB). Even from the beginning years at the Donnelly, Caldwell was able to attract first rate artists, most notably Beverly Sills and Joan Sutherland, to the company's roster. She also had an eye for emerging talent with singers like James Billings getting their start with the company. Other notable singers to have sung in OCB productions include Eunice Alberts, John Alexander, Andrea Bradford, Richard Cassilly, Plácido Domingo, Donald Gramm, Marilyn Horne, Eva Likova, Elaine Malbin, Éva Marton, Sherrill Milnes, Magda Olivero, Renata Tebaldi, Norman Treigle, Shirley Verrett, Anja Silja, and Jon Vickers among many others.

Likewise, a number of notable people have worked on the staff of the company or have served in some other artistic capacity. Ralph Lyford served as the company's associate conductor for a number of years and Kent Nagano began his conducting career with the company. Laszlo J. Bonis served as its president (1967–1986), and Dar Williams worked as a stage manager for the company. Also many important designers worked with the company, including Rudolf Heinrich, Ming Cho Lee, Herbert Senn, Helen Pond, Gilbert Vaughn Hemsley Jr., and David Sharir. Ballet dancer Pat Colgate performed with the company on a number of occasions. Associate Director, Esquire Jauchem went on to found The Boston Repertory Theatre (with Sarah Caldwell's assistance) produce, direct and design opera, theater and television.

During its 32-year history, the Opera Company of Boston gained international acclaim for its innovative programming. Under the leadership of Caldwell, the company staged the American premieres of such operas as Arnold Schoenberg's Moses und Aron, Sergei Prokofiev's War and Peace, Hector Berlioz' Les Troyens and Benvenuto Cellini, Luigi Nono's Intolleranza 1960, Alban Berg's Lulu, Roger Sessions' Montezuma, and Peter Maxwell Davies's Taverner to name just a few.

== See also ==
- Boston Lyric Opera, founded in 1976, largest opera company in New England
- Guerilla Opera, founded in 2007, specializing in contemporary chamber operas
- Opera Boston, 2003–2012
- Odyssey Opera (Boston), founded in 2013
