= Madame White Snake (opera) =

- Opera by Zhou Long
- Librettist: Cerise Lim Jacobs
- Language: English
- Based on: Legend of the White Snake
- Premiere: 26 February 2010; Cutler Majestic Theatre

Madame White Snake is an opera with music by Zhou Long and libretto by Cerise Lim Jacobs, published by Oxford University Press. Awarded the 2011 Pulitzer Prize for Music, it was premiered on Feb. 26, 2010, by Opera Boston at the Cutler Majestic Theatre. It is based on the Legend of the White Snake and was created by Jacobs as a gift to her now late husband. The Pulitzer Committee described the opera as, "a deeply expressive opera that draws on a Chinese folk tale to blend the musical traditions of the East and the West." Zhou stated, "I have been working very hard to blend the East and the West for years." The opera was performed, in English, in Beijing in October 2010. In China Zhou's 2010 English-language opera shares the same title as the traditional Beijing opera version, Legend of the White Snake, Báishézhuàn, but is distinguished by the term "geju" (Western opera) rather than "jingju" (Beijing opera).

Jacobs' first libretto and Zhou's first opera, it was the first opera commissioned by Opera Boston, co-commissioned by the Beijing Music Festival Arts Foundation. Jacobs is a Chinese-American retired lawyer and Zhou is a Chinese-American composer. "Giving voice to sweeping melodies worthy of Puccini without sounding imitative, and employing such vocal effects as bent pitches, slides and Sprechstimme to suggest the unique idiom of Peking Opera, [Zhou] wove both aesthetics into a unique whole, creating a vivid and freestanding musical world of his own."

- Director: Robert Woodruff
- Conductor: Gil Rose
- Xiao Ching: Michael Maniaci
- Madame White Snake: Ying Huang
- Abbot Fahai: Dong-Jian Gong
- Xu Xian: Peter Tantsits
