= Opera Boston =

Massachusetts opera company

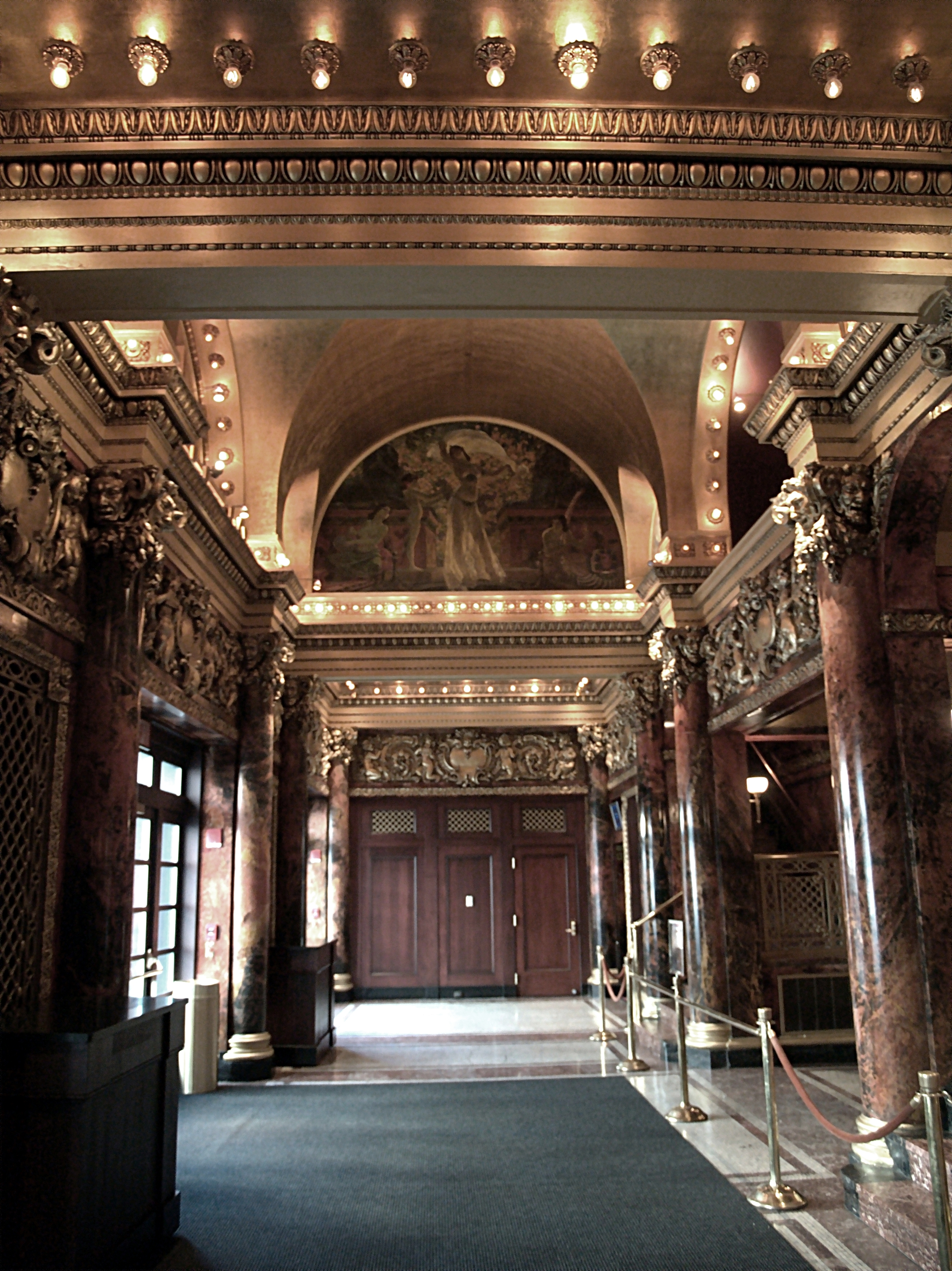
Lobby of the Cutler Majestic Theatre, in 2009.

Opera Boston was an opera company in Boston, Massachusetts. It specialized in less-frequently heard repertoire as well as modern works or opera premieres, along with opera education and outreach programs designed to bring opera education to children both in schools and after-school programs throughout the Boston area.

After eight years, it was announced on 23 December 2011 that Opera Boston would cease operations on 1 January 2012. Board chairman Winifred Gray and president Gregory Bulger cited "an insurmountable budget deficit" as the reason.

Its home base was the Cutler Majestic Theatre, a 1903 Beaux-Arts opera house designed by architect John Galen Howard.

In addition to its regular season the company mounted an "Opera Unlimited Festival" which presented 20th and 21st century chamber opera in an outdoor setting, free of charge. The Festival also commissioned new works.

== Productions ==
Dates in parentheses are the dates of the Opera Boston production. The list is limited to only those works which are not part of the standard repertory.

- June 2003 Opera Unlimited
  - Powder Her Face by Thomas Adès
  - Full Moon in March by John Harbison
  - Touissaint Before the Spirits by Elena Ruehr
  - The Cask of Amontillado by Daniel Pinkham
  - Garden Party by Daniel Pinkham
- 2003–2004 Season
  - Candide by Leonard Bernstein (November 2003)
  - Nixon in China by John Adams (March 2004)
  - Luisa Miller by Giuseppe Verdi (April–May 2004)
- 2004–2005 Season
  - La Vie parisienne by Jacques Offenbach (October 2004)
  - Alceste by Christoph Wilibald Gluck (January 2005)
  - The Crucible by Robert Ward (April 2005)
- 2005–2006 Season
  - The Consul by Gian Carlo Menotti (October 2005)
  - L'étoile by Emmanuel Chabrier (March 2006)
  - Lucrezia Borgia by Gaetano Donizetti (April–May 2006)
- June 2006 Opera Unlimited
  - Angels in America by Péter Eötvös (North American premiere)
- 2006–2007 Season
  - La clemenza di Tito by Wolfgang Amadeus Mozart (October 2006)
  - The Rise and Fall of the City of Mahagonny by Kurt Weill (February 2007)
  - The Pearl Fishers by Georges Bizet (May 2007)
- 2007–2008 Season
  - Ainadamar by Osvaldo Golijov (October 2007)
  - Semele by George Frideric Handel (February 2008)
  - Ernani by Giuseppe Verdi (May 2008)
- 2008–2009 Season
  - Der Freischütz by Carl Maria von Weber (October 2008)
  - The Nose by Dmitri Shostakovich (February 2009)
- 2009–2010 Season
  - Tancredi by Giocchino Rossini (October 2009)
  - Madame White Snake by Zhou Long (February 2010) (world premiere)
  - La Grande-Duchesse de Gérolstein by Jacques Offenbach (April–May 2010)

== See also ==
- Boston Lyric Opera, founded in 1976
- Guerilla Opera, founded in Boston in 2007
- Odyssey Opera, founded in 2013
- Opera Company of Boston, closed in 1990
- New York City Opera, closed in 2013
- San Diego Opera, at brink of closure in 2014
