= Zhou Long =

Chinese American composer (born 1953)

Zhou Long (simplified Chinese: 周龙; traditional Chinese: 周龍; pinyin: Zhōu Lóng; born July 8, 1953) is a Chinese American composer. He won the 2011 Pulitzer Prize for Music.

== Biography ==
Zhou Long was born in Beijing, China. Born into an artistic family, he began studying piano from an early age. Due to the artistic restrictions implemented during the Cultural Revolution, he was forced to delay his piano studies and live on a state-run farm where he operated a tractor. The deserted landscape with fierce winds and fires he experienced during the Cultural Revolution made a deep impression and influence his compositions even today.

Nearing the end of the Cultural Revolution, he was able to resume his musical studies in the areas of composition, music theory, conducting and also traditional Chinese music. One year after the end of the Cultural Revolution, Zhou Long was one of one hundred students chosen from eighteen thousand applicants to study at the newly reopened Central Conservatory of Music in Beijing in 1977. From 1977 to 1983, he studied composition with Su Xia.

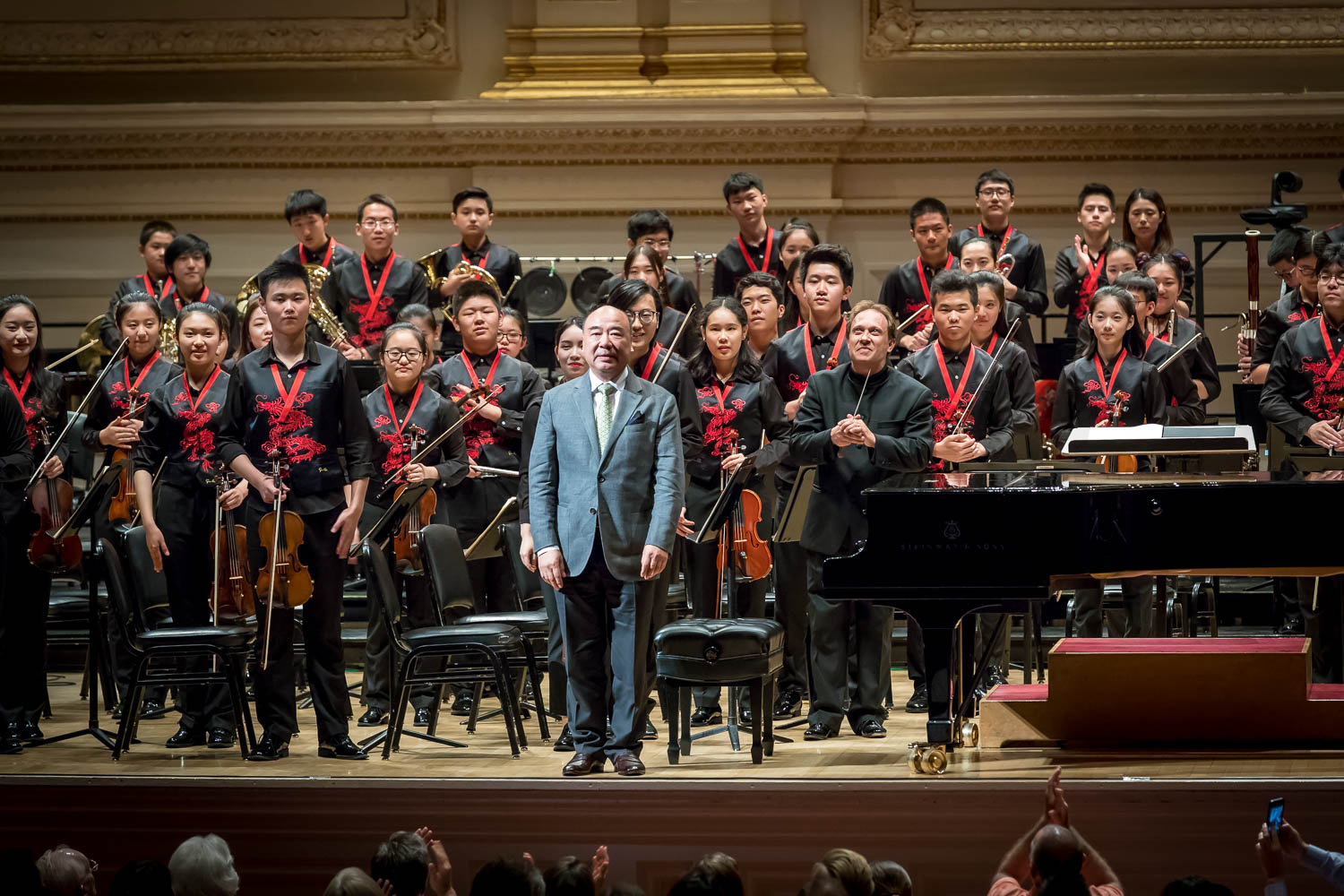
Zhou Long with conductor Ludovic Morlot and the National Youth Orchestra of China receiving applause for a performance of his original composition "The Rhyme of Taigu" at Carnegie Hall on July 22, 2017.

After graduating in 1983, Zhou Long was appointed with the position of composer-in-residence with the National Broadcasting Symphony Orchestra of China. With only a brief stay in this position, Zhou Long journeyed to the United States under a fellowship to attend Columbia University and further his composition studies with Chou Wen-chung, Mario Davidovsky, and George Edwards, receiving a Doctor of Musical Arts in 1993. Living in Brooklyn, New York, he became the music director of Music From China, a group founded in 1984 with the aim of presenting concerts of traditional Chinese music in the United States. Under the direction of Zhou Long, Music From China expanded its original goals to also encompass contemporary Chinese works that reflect both Chinese and Western sound worlds and musical languages.

In 2002, Zhou Long served as the composer-in-residence Music Alive!, the Silk Road Project Festival of the Seattle Symphony Orchestra with Yo-Yo Ma. He currently holds the position of Distinguished Professor of Composition at the University of Missouri-Kansas City Conservatory of Music. From 2004 to 2005, Zhou Long was invited to be the composer-in-residence at the Cleveland Institute of Music. He has additionally provided many master classes and lectures at Brooklyn College, Columbia University, UC Berkeley, the Central Conservatory of Music in Beijing, and several of the top conservatories in the United States. Zhou Long has expanded his works from the music world to reach other artistic genres, collaborating with H.T. Chen, Chiang Chin, Gao Xingjian, Loni Ding, Ellen Perry and several others.

After a decade, Zhou Long was given the ASCAP Adventurous Programming Award in 1999. He won the 2011 Pulitzer Prize for Music for his opera, Madame White Snake, premiered on February 26, 2010, by the Opera Boston at the Cutler Majestic Theatre. Zhou Long has been a citizen of the United States since 1999 and is married to the composer-violinist Chen Yi.

In July 2017, the National Youth Orchestra of China, conducted by Ludovic Morlot of the Seattle Symphony, performed Zhou Long's piece "The Rhyme of Taigu" to a sold-out Carnegie Hall.

== Musical style ==
Accompanied by other Chinese composers such as Tan Dun, Bright Sheng, and Chen Yi, Zhou Long and his contemporaries all primarily entered conservatories in Beijing and Shanghai immediately following the Cultural Revolution. After their studies, they all arrived in the United States in pursuit of higher degrees and evolving their music by intertwining elements of their old and new musical cultures.

Considering himself as neither a solely Chinese nor American composer, Zhou Long draws upon influences from both musical spheres to create unique and unheard sounds in Western music circles. After arriving in the United States, a culture different from China (especially in the years following the Cultural Revolution), the different music culture in America allowed Zhou long to explore his expressive world, expand his compositional techniques and obtain a musical language of his own. He says, "Thinking about what we could do to share different cultures in our new society, I have been composing music seriously to achieve my goal of improving the understanding between peoples from various backgrounds. My conceptions have often come from ancient Chinese poetry." In this regard, Zhou Long utilizes the resources of two different cultures’ sound spectrums and traditions as well as media and technology. He writes, “Verses of poetry may give you the frame; the movements of calligraphy may give you the rhythm; an ancient dark ink painting may give you space, distance and layers; a variety of sound sources may give you the color. Finally, craft ensures your own full expression.”

As described in his own words, Zhou Long works to capture Chinese timbres and folk themes and incorporate them with Western conceptions of harmony, chromaticism and angularity. He also frequently takes familiar sounds and tunes, alters them through dissonances and thematic twists.
