= Z. Jane Wang =

Chinese and American physicist

Zheng Jane Wang is a Chinese and American physicist known for her research on insect flight. She is a professor of physics and of mechanical and aerospace engineering at Cornell University.

== Education and career ==
Wang studied physics at Fudan University, graduating in 1989, and completed a Ph.D. in physics at the University of Chicago in 1997.

After postdoctoral research at the University of Oxford and the Courant Institute of Mathematical Sciences, she became an assistant professor at Cornell University in 1999, in the Department of Theoretical and Applied Mechanics. She was promoted to associate professor in 2004, and moved to mechanical and aerospace engineering as a full professor in 2009. In 2011 she added an affiliation as a professor of physics. She has published over 180 journal papers and over 100 conference papers that are peer reveiwed.

== Recognition ==
Wang was named a Fellow of the American Physical Society (APS) in 2014, after a nomination from the APS Division of Fluid Dynamics, "for fundamental contributions to our understanding of insect flight through simulations of hovering, elucidation of unsteady forces, development of computational tools, and analyses of flight efficiency, stability, and control". She was given a Simons Fellowship in Mathematics and Theoretical Physics in 2020.

A chamber music album by Elena Ruehr, Jane Wang Considers the Dragonfly, is named for Wang.
