= Say It Ain't So, Joe (opera) =

Say It Ain't So, Joe is a chamber opera in two acts by Curtis K. Hughes inspired by text drawn from the public record of the 2008 United States vice-presidential debate where vice presidential candidate Joe Biden is addressed by Sarah Palin in a similar manner as the famous quote referring to Shoeless Joe Jackson. Commissioned and produced by Guerilla Opera, Say It Ain't So, Joe premiered in Boston on September 19, 2009, at the Boston Conservatory Zack Box Theater.

== Premiere ==
=== Cast ===
Role	Voice type	Premiere cast, September 19, 2009
Sarah Palin 1	soprano	Jennifer Ashe
Sarah Palin 2 / Diane Sawyer	soprano	Aliana de la Guardia
Gwen Ifill / Hillary Clinton / Interviewer	mezzo-soprano	Amanda Keil
Joe Biden / Joe the Plumber	baritone	Brian Church

=== Instrumentalists ===
- Kent O’Doherty, saxophones
- Rane Moore, clarinets
- Javier Caballero, cello
- Mike Williams, percussion.

=== Production staff ===
- Nathan Troup, director
- Julia Noulin-Merat, scenic designer
- Corey Rancourt, lighting designer
- Rudolf Rojahn, production manager
- Brendan P. Buckley, stage manager
- Anthony Scibilia, production cameraman.

== Composer's view ==
"When watching the US Vice Presidential debate in 2008, I was struck by the extraordinary musical contrasts between the voices of Sarah Palin and Joe Biden, as well as the convergence of two such fascinating life stories, both containing tragic, heroic, and comic elements. The audience for my opera Say it ain't so, Joe will experience a surreal and fractured vision of that remarkable encounter, as well as brief glimpses of other contemporaneous events and political figures, with some fantastical digressions." – Curtis K. Hughes

== Synopsis ==
=== Act 1 ===
Prelude

Scene One: January 2009: The Palin Residence. Wasilla, Alaska

Interlude

Scene Two: October 2, 2008: United States vice-presidential debate, 2008, Washington University in St. Louis, Missouri

Scene Three: August 28, 2008

Interlude

Scene Four: October 2, 2008

Scene Five: October 2008: Good Morning America television interview

Scene Six: October 2, 2008

=== Act 2 ===
Prelude

Scene One: Late 2008: Television Interview

Scene Two: October 2, 2008

Interlude

Scene Three: Late October 2008: Republican campaign rally

Scene Four: October 2, 2008

Scene Five: in illo tempore

Scene Six: October 2, 2008
