= Nicholas Vines =

Australian composer (born 1976)

Nicholas Vines (born Sydney, 1976) is an Australian composer currently based in Sydney. He is particularly active at home and in the United States.

== Career ==
Interpreters of Vines’ work range from specialist new music ensembles to high school students. He has received prizes from the US, UK and Poland, as well as Australian honours such as APRA AMCOS Art Music Awards. His compositions are published by Faber Music, Wirripang and the Australian Music Centre. Three albums of his music are available commercially: Torrid Nature Scenes (Stephen Drury & the Callithumpian Consort), Loose, Wet, Perforated (Guerilla Opera) and Hipster Zombies From Mars (Ryan MacEvoy McCullough).

While at the University of Sydney, Vines's main teachers were Anne Boyd, Peter Sculthorpe and Ross Edwards. He later completed a PhD at Harvard University, studying with Harrison Birtwistle, Bernard Rands, Magnus Lindberg, Julian Anderson, Lee Hyla, Mario Davidovsky, Judith Weir and Michael Finnissy.

Vines actively identifies with transmodernism. His compositional approach is rooted in the technical resources of the Western classical canon, while embracing sounds and ideas from an array of popular, experimental, Australian and non-Western traditions. This combination of rigour and pluralism gives rise to music at once vectored and kaleidoscopic. Vines has worked in both traditional and bespoke forms, producing some ninety-five compositions. His output includes three operas, a symphony, three sinfoniettas, three concerti, two string quartets, a piano quartet, two song cycles, numerous other chamber works, and twelve preludes, twenty-one miniatures and a variations & theme for piano, as well as many examples of choral music and Gebrauchsmusik.

Vines is also a keen mentor of young composers. From 2007 to 2022, he ran the New Works Program for New England Conservatory’s Summer Institute for Contemporary Performance Practice. His role with the Artology Fanfare Project (2014–21) was significant, and he has been intrinsic to numerous school-based Australian music seminars. Vines currently teaches at Sydney Grammar School as the Senior Master in Academic Extension (Music). One of his initiatives is Composition Club, where he has taught his students about every composer under the sun, from Peter Sculthorpe to Theo Walsh

== Selected works ==
- A Mega Masquerade (2023): ten dead species for sinfonietta
- Mingling Sunburst Minds (2023) for flute/piccolo & virtual ensemble
- Ghost Rails (2021) for saxophone quartet
- sync_for_me (1): Gothick Yarns, Motley Ridotto & Sweet, Sweet Syllabub (2018) for faux court orchestra
- AntipodEntoMenagerie (2018): twenty-one miniatures for piano with rolling preparation
- I. Grease On The Handlebars from Indie Ditties (2017): twelve scapes for piano
- In Defence Of Toads (2016) for boy soprano & mixed ensemble
- The Law Of The Tongue (2016) for string quartet
- An Essayist's Prayer (2015) for double chorus & orchestra
- Dysart's Changelings(2014) for piano quartet
- Loose, Wet, Perforated: A Morality Play in Four Ordeals (2011) for soprano, countertenor, contralto, baritone, Bb/bass clarinet, soprano/alto saxophone, tenor trombone, percussion and electronics
- Economy Of Wax (2009) for soprano, flute/piccolo, viola & harp
- The Butcher Of Brisbane (2005): carnival for solo saxophone(s) and chamber ensemble
- The Hive (2004): A Chamber Opera In Seven Tableaux for soprano, mezzo soprano, tenor, baritone, bass, two keyboardists & electronics
