= No Exit (opera) =

No Exit is a one-act chamber opera by Andy Vores based on the 1944 existentialist play by Jean-Paul Sartre. The opera was commissioned by Boston's Guerilla Opera and had its world premiere, on April 24, 2008, at the Boston Conservatory's Zack Box Theatre.

== Roles ==
Role	Voice type	Premiere Cast, 24 April 2008	Chicago Opera Vanguard Cast, 16-18 October 2009	Florida Grand Opera Cast, 27 & 28 February, 1 March 2014	Project Blank Cast, 9-11 June 2023
Estelle	soprano	Aliana de la Guardia	Susan Nelson	Riley Svatos	Mariana Flores-Bucio
Inez	mezzo-soprano	Leslie Ann Leytham	Caitlin McKechney	Caitlin McKechney	Leslie Ann Leytham
Garcin	tenor	Michael Rausch	Matthew Newlin	Casey Finnigan	Miguel Zazueta
Valet	baritone	Peter D. Weathers	Peter D. Weathers	Carlton Ford	Jonathan Nussman

== Performance history ==
The opera was written for Boston's Guerilla Opera and had its world premiere, directed by Sally Stunkel, on April 24, 2008, at the Boston Conservatory's Zack Box Theatre. The opera had its second production by Chicago Opera Vanguard October 16–18, 2009 in the Hoover-Leppen Theater at the Center on Halsted. No Exit received its third production with Guerilla Opera, directed by Nathan Troup, on September 19, 2013. No Exit was performed on February 27, 28 and March 1, 2014 as a part of Florida Grand Opera's Unexpected Operas in Unexpected Places initiative, designed to bring lesser-known operas to unique venues throughout South Florida.

Most recently, No Exit received its west-coast premiere by Project Blank June 9-11, 2023 at Bread & Salt in San Diego, California. This fifth production was directed by Robert Castro.
