= Le Cid (opera) =

1885 opera by Jules Massenet

- Opera by Jules Massenet
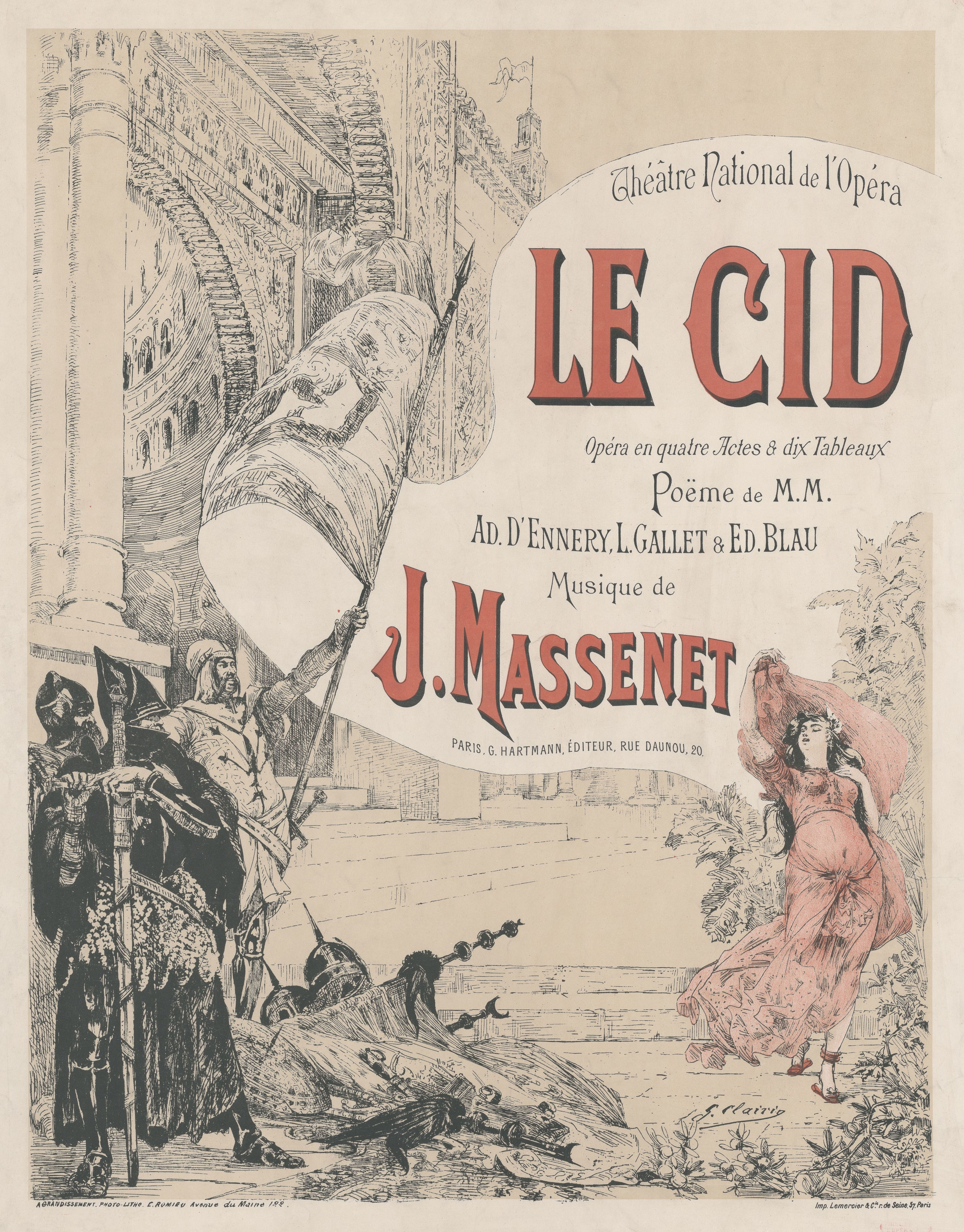
- Original poster from 1885
- Librettist: Adolphe d'Ennery; Louis Gallet; Édouard Blau
- Language: French
- Based on: Le Cid by Pierre Corneille
- Premiere: 30 November 1885; Paris Opéra

Le Cid is an opera in four acts and ten tableaux by Jules Massenet to a French libretto by Adolphe d'Ennery, Louis Gallet and Édouard Blau. It is based on the play of the same name by Pierre Corneille.

It was first performed by a star-studded cast at the Paris Opéra on 30 November 1885 in the presence of President Grévy, with Jean de Reszke as Rodrigue. The staging was directed by Pedro Gailhard, with costumes designed by Comte Lepic, and sets by Eugène Carpezat (act 1), Enrico Robecchi and his student Amable (act 2), Auguste Alfred Rubé, Philippe Chaperon and their students Marcel Jambon (act 3), and Jean-Baptiste Lavastre (act 4). The opera had been seen 150 times by 1919 but faded from the repertory and was not performed again in Paris until the 2015 revival at the Palais Garnier. While Le Cid is not in the standard operatic repertory, the ballet suite is a popular concert and recording piece which includes dances from different regions of Spain. It was specially created by Massenet for the prima ballerina Rosita Mauri. An opera on the subject had been composed by Sacchini, Il Cid, for London in 1783, and from 1890 to 1892 Debussy worked on, but did not complete, an opera Rodrigue et Chimène also based on Corneille.

== Performance history ==
After the premiere, the Paris Opera continued to revive Le Cid until 1919, reaching over 150 performances at the theatre by that date. A new production was mounted at the Opéra in the 2014/15 season, conducted by Michel Plasson with Roberto Alagna in the title role. This production was first seen in June 2011 at the Opéra de Marseille in a production directed by Charles Roubaud, conducted by Jacques Lacombe, with Alagna singing Rodrigue. In March–April 2015 at the Paris Opera Alagna reprised the title role, alongside Sonia Ganassi and Annick Massis.

Local premieres took place in Frankfurt, Antwerp, and Vienna in 1887, followed by Rome, New Orleans Geneva and Milan in the years following. In New York, the premiere at the Metropolitan Opera House in 1897 was revived in 1901 and 1902, and a cut concert performance on 8 March 1976 at Carnegie Hall with Plácido Domingo and Grace Bumbry was later issued as a commercial recording.

It was produced in 1979 in Limoges and Saint-Etienne conducted by Pierre-Michel Le Conte with Maurice Maievsky in the title role with Hélia T'Hézan, Robert Massard, Peggy Bouveret and René Bianco, then at the 1994 Massenet Festival under Patrick Fournillier with Michele Command and Chris Merritt. Other modern productions include 1981 in San Francisco under Julius Rudel with Carol Neblett and William Lewis, 1984 and 1993 in Rouen, 1999 at Seville, and a 2001 production by the Washington Opera, starring Domingo, which was shown on PBS television, and was seen in Zurich in January 2008. In September 2015, Odyssey Opera performed Le Cid for the first time in Boston, a semi-staged version conducted by Gil Rose, with tenor Paul Groves in the title role.

The opera had its UK premiere on 24 July 2018, performed by the Dorset Opera Festival at Bryanston, with Leonardo Capalbo in the title role, Lee Bisset as Chimène and Paul Gay as Don Diègue, conducted by Jeremy Carnall.

== Roles ==
| Role | Voice type | Premiere cast, 30 November 1885 Conductor: Ernest Altès |
|---|---|---|
| Chimène | soprano | Fidès Devriès |
| Rodrigue | tenor | Jean de Reszke |
| Don Diègue | bass | Édouard de Reszke |
| Le Roi | bass | Léon Melchissédec |
| Le comte de Gormas | bass | Pol Plançon |
| L'Infante | soprano | Rosa Bosman |
| Saint Jacques | baritone | Lambert |
| L'envoyé maure | basse chantante | Balleroy |
| Don Arias | tenor | Girard |
| Don Alonzo | bass | Sentein |
Chorus: Noblemen, Ladies of the court, Bishops, Priests, Monks, Captains and Soldiers, People; Dancers (for act 2 ballet).

== Synopsis ==
=== Act 1 ===
==== Tableau 1 ====
In Burgos, a hall in the Gormas palace

To the sound of fanfares outside the friends of the Comte de Gormas recount how the King is to make Rodrigue a knight, despite his young age. Gormas desires to be named the governor of the Infanta by the King. Gormas however approves the romantic attachment which his daughter Chimène has for Rodrigue. The Infanta has confessed to Chimène that she too loves Rodrigue, but as she is not allowed to love a mere knight Rodrigue could proceed to marry Chimène.

==== Tableau 2 ====
A gallery in the royal palace leading to an entrance to Burgos cathedral

With bells sounding, the people give thanks for victory over the Moors. The King now rewards Rodrigue by knighting him ("Ô noble lame étincelante"), and Rodrigue swears his faith to Saint Jacques de Compostelle. The King next names Don Diègue as governor of the Infanta, and this is seen as an insult by the Comte de Gormas and his friends. Don Diègue holds out his hand and wishes the marriage of his son and Chimène, but the count insults, swipes and disarms him. Cursing his loss of strength and old age, Don Diègue demands that his son revenges his honour. Rodrigue bemoans his fate, and the loss of his happiness, when he learns that the challenger is the father of his beloved.

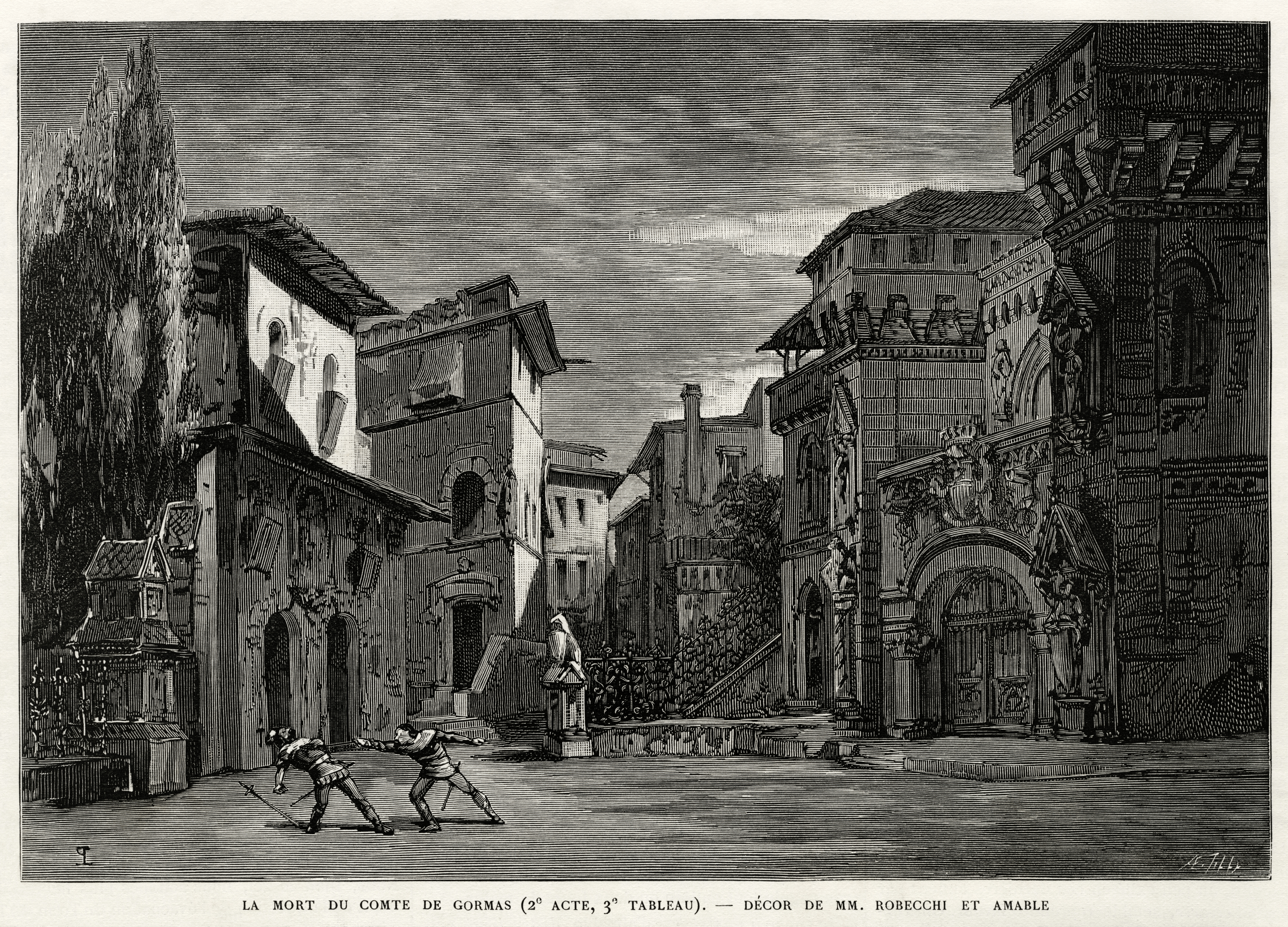
The death of Gormas, act 2, tableau 3 (set by Robecchi and Amable), from the coverage of the opera's première by L'Illustration

=== Act 2 ===
==== Tableau 3 ====
A street in Burgos at night

Rodrigue wonders if he should allow himself to be killed by the count rather than kill him, to avoid the anger and hatred of Chimène, but he concludes that he owes more to his father than his loved one and that he must go ahead and seek vengeance. In the following duel he swiftly kills the count. A crowd and a jubilant Don Diègue arrive on the scene, but when Chimène rushes out to find out about the murderer of her father she faints when she discovers his identity.

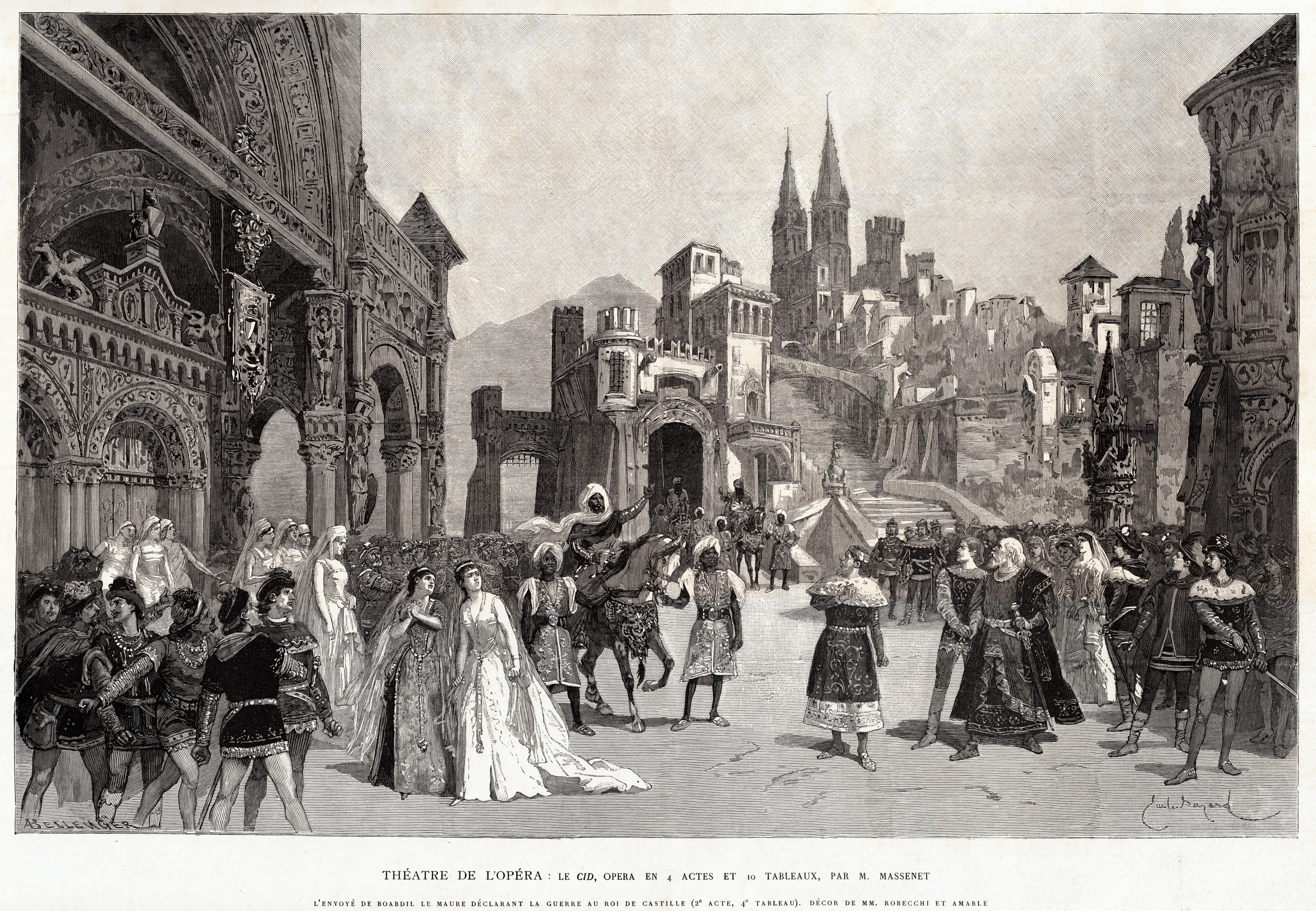
Act 2, tableau 4: The Envoy of Boabdil of the Moors declares war with the King of Castille; set by Robecchi and Amable

==== Tableau 4 ====
The main square of Burgos. It is a lively spring day

The Infanta distributes alms and dancing follows: a Castillane, Andalouse, Aragonaise, Aubade, Catalane, Madrilène, Navarraise (ballet). Chimène demands justice to the King against Rodrigue and will hear of no pity or pardon for him. Don Diègue says that his son has only revenged him and that he should bear the accusation. The Infanta feels her lost hopes revive. A moorish envoy brings a declaration of war to the King from his leader Boabdil, who is on the march. The King reproaches Rodrigue for having lost Spain's most courageous captain and Don Diègue calls for his son to take the place of the dead count in battle. Rodrigue asks the King for a day of grace – the time to return victorious. The King consents and the people acclaim Rodrigue while Chimène in despair continues to demand justice.

=== Act 3 ===
==== Tableau 5 ====
Chimène's chamber, night

Chimène gives way to grief ("Pleurez! pleurez mes yeux...") at her dilemma. Rodrigue appears to say farewell but sad at having to go into battle with her hate behind him. As he departs, she calls on him to cover himself in glory to diminish his sins and to forget the past. She flees, ashamed to have allowed some hope of pardon for her father's murderer.

==== Tableau 6 ====
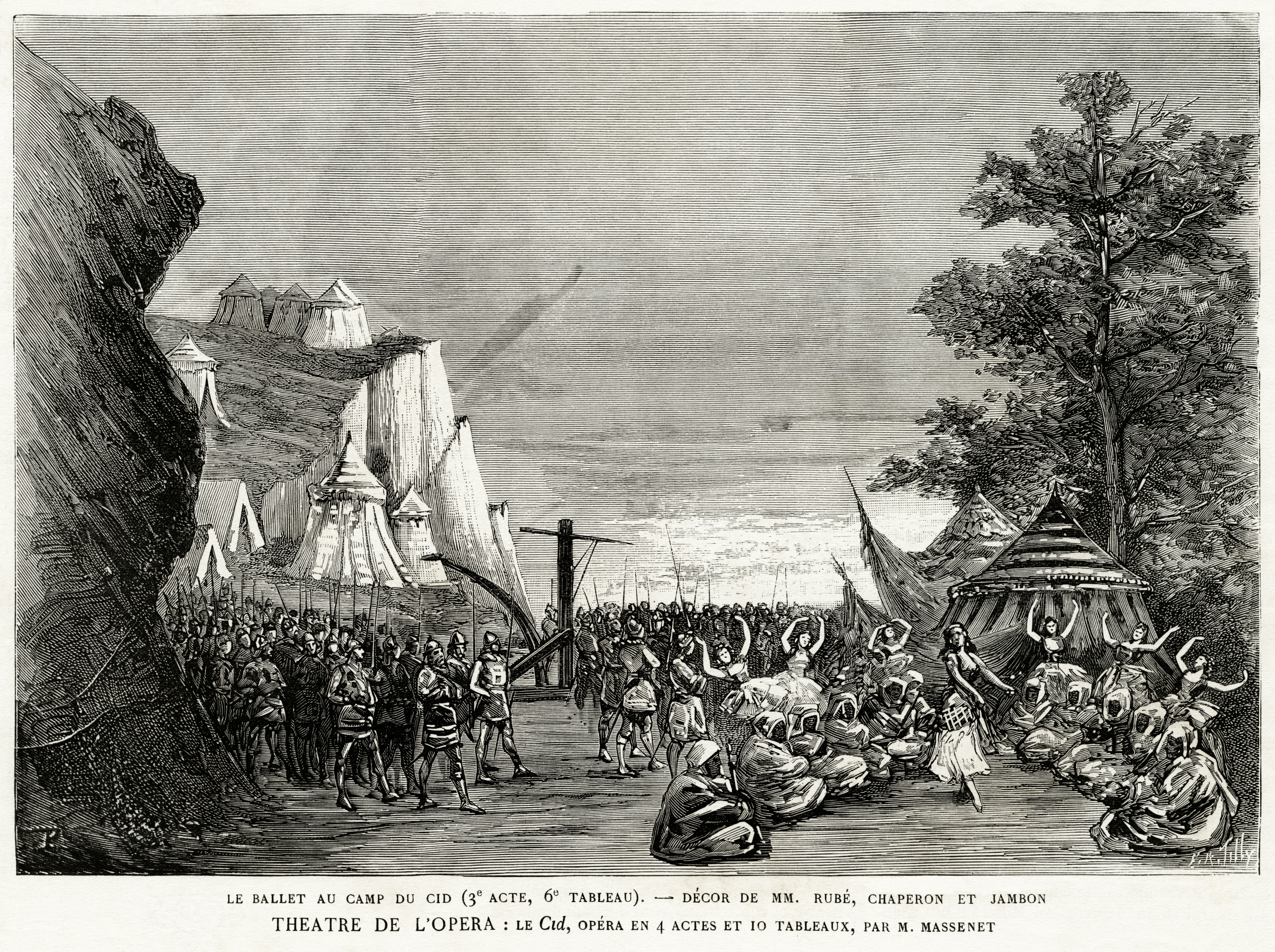
Act 3, tableau 6: The ballet at Le Cid's camp; set by Rubé, Chaperon and Jambon

Rodrigue's camp

At evening the officers and soldiers from Navarre and Castille drink and sing. Prisoners and Moorish musicians wait on one side. After a drinking song and a Moorish rhapsody some of the soldiers want to leave, confronted by such a large army of moors.

==== Tableau 7 ====
Rodrigue's tent

Rodrigue submits a fervent prayer ("Ô souverain, ô juge, ô père") which is answered by the image of Saint Jacques announcing that he will be victorious. In thunder and lightning the tent disappears.

==== Tableau 8 ====
The camp ~ the battle

At dawn soldiers run in groups, fanfares sound and all rush out, promised victory by Rodrigue.

Pleurez! pleurez, mes yeux...
Chimène's aria from act 3; sung by Marguerite Sylva for Edison Records in 1910

Ô souverain, ô juge, ô père!
Sung by Enrico Caruso in 1916 for the Victor Talking Machine Company

=== Act 4 ===
==== Tableau 9 ====
A room in the royal palace in Grenada

Deserting soldiers tell Don Diègue that Rodrigue was killed in battle but he throws them out. He is more content with the noble and courageous end than the death of his son. The Infanta and Chimène learn the news in despair and all three mourn Rodrigue. Chimène swears to them that she still loved him and that he believed himself loved of her as he died. Fanfares in the distance and cheers in the city warn her that Rodrigue still lives.

==== Tableau 10 ====
Royal courtyard in Grenada

The crowd acclaim Rodrigue, named Le Cid by the chiefs of the vanquished moors. The King offers him rewards, but Rodrigue replies that only Chimène can name his fate. As she cannot pardon him nor demand his punishment, he will himself pass justice, and he draws his sword to kill himself. Chimène hesitates and pardons him through her declaration of love and the opera ends in general rejoicing.

== Noted arias ==
- Rodrigue: "O noble lame étincelante"
- Chimène: "Pleurez, pleurez mes yeux"
- Rodrigue: "O souverain, o juge, o père"
