= Andrea Bradford =

American opera singer

Andrea Bradford (born December 19, 1949) is an American soprano, opera singer, educator, and businesswoman. A graduate of the Oberlin Conservatory of Music and the Boston University College of Fine Arts, Bradford has maintained concurrent careers in performance, education, and business. On the stage she is best known for her lengthy association with the Opera Company of Boston. As a teacher she has taught voice on the faculties of the Tanglewood Music Center and Xavier University of Louisiana. She is the former director of minority and multicultural affairs at Columbia Business School, and has worked as a business executive for a variety of American corporations.

== Early life and education ==
The daughter of Dr. Henry Bradford Jr. and Nell Lane Bradford, Andrea Bradford was born on December 19, 1949, in Huntsville, Alabama. Her parents were pastors and music ministers who served at Church Street Cumberland Presbyterian Church in Huntsville for 36 years. They also both taught on the music faculty of Alabama A&M University. Andrea's early music studies were with her parents. She studied piano from the time she was five years old until she was 20.

Bradford's early schooling was in Huntsville where she attended the Oakwood College Laboratory School for her primary school education, followed by secondary school education at the Council Training School. She was sent by her parents to be educated at St. Francis De Sales High School (SFDSHS), an all-black boarding school for girls operated by the Catholic Church in Powhatan, Virginia. There she served as the organist for daily mass services, and received voice lessons from Sister Mary Elise S.B.S. who was the co-founder of Opera Ebony in New York City. She graduated from SFDSHS in 1966. In 1965 she won first prize in the Southeast Region division of National Association of Teachers of Singing (NATS) competition for high school students which was held at the University of Georgia.

Bradford began her university education at the historically black Oakwood College (OC) in Huntsville where she studied during the 1966–1967 academic year. She studied voice at OC with Alyne Dumas Lee. In December 1966 she was the soprano soloist in the OC music department's presentation of George Frideric Handel's Messiah. She transferred to the Oberlin Conservatory of Music in Ohio where she graduated with Bachelors of Music degree in vocal performance in 1970. While a student there she won first place in the Mid-Western division of the NATS competition for college students in 1968, and that same year was a Messiah soloist at Oberlin.

She pursued graduate music studies at the Boston University College of Fine Arts (BUCFA) where she graduated with a Master of Music in 1973. Her teachers at BUCFA included Mary Davenport and Allen Rogers. She also completed two years of work towards a doctoral degree at BUCFA. In 1973 she participated in masterclasses with Eileen Farrell given at the Jacobs School of Music, and in the summer of 1974 she studied opera at the American Institute of Musical Studies in Graz, Austria. She also studied singing with Donna Roll and John Balme.

== Career ==
While studying at Boston University, Bradford concurrently worked in variety positions; including director of the Community Center of Boston, and as a voice teacher at the National Center for Afro-American Artists, the Belmont School of Music of Massachusetts and the Tanglewood Music Center. In 1976 she joined the music faculty of Xavier University of Louisiana where she gave a faculty recital in 1977. She taught at Xavier for two years, and during that period married baritone Robert Honeysucker.

After this Bradford maintained a performance career while simultaneously working in other jobs including as a recruiting coordinator for Bain & Company from 1985 to 1988, and then as an executive recruiter for Isaacson, Miller. In 1975 she made her professional opera debut with the Opera Company of Boston (OCB). She performed on a recurring but periodic basis with this company into the early 1990s. Some of the operas she performed in with the OCB included Beethoven's Fidelio (1976), Roger Sessions's Montezuma (1976), Orphée aux enfers (1982, as Iris), Madame Butterfly (1988, as Kate Pinkerton), The Barber of Seville (1988, as Berta), and La traviata (1989, as Annina). In 1990 she created the role of Chantal in the OCB's world premiere production of Robert Di Domenica's The Balcony.

In 1985 Bradford won first place in the Southern Regional Opera Competition. In 1986 she performed for the re-opening of the Alabama Theatre after it had undergone a renovation; performing in a program dedicated to Swedish music with Rachel Mathes and Brad Liebl. In 1991 she performed at the Bolshoi Theatre in Moscow, and in 1992 she performed with the Boston Lyric Opera in Kurt Weill's Lost in the Stars. From 1992 to 1994 she worked as assistant director of admissions for the Berklee College of Music, and left that post to become director of minority and multicultural affairs at Columbia Business School In 1996 she starred in the premiere Leroy Jenkins's The Negro Burial Ground at The Kitchen. She returned to The Kitchen in 2001 as Grace in Jenkins's jazz opera Three Willies

During her career Bradford has also worked as national director of college recruiting for KPMG, vice president of organizational consulting and career management at Right Management Consultants, and as operations manager for West-Park Presbyterian Church. In 2012 she became director of human resources for Ms. Foundation for Women. In 2023, she was recognized as one of "Boston’s most admired, beloved, and successful Black Women leaders" by the Black Women Lead project.
