= Elena Ruehr =

American musician, music educator and composer

Elena Ruehr (born 1963) is an American musician, music educator and composer.

== Life and career ==
Elena Ruehr was born in Ann Arbor, Michigan, as the daughter of a mathematician and an English professor. She grew up in Houghton, Michigan and began piano lessons at age four. She studied composition at the University of Michigan with William Bolcom and at The Juilliard School with Vincent Persichetti and Bernard Rands. She also studied dance and has performed with Javanese and West African ensembles. In 1992, Ruehr took a teaching position at MIT. Her compositions have been performed internationally and many have been recorded and are available on media. Many of Ruehr's compositions involve setting poetry to music.

Ruehr is married to Seward Rutkove and they have one daughter, Sophie.

== Selected works ==
Ruehr has composed works for orchestra, chamber ensemble, solo instruments and vocals.

- Ladder to the Moon (2003) for orchestra
- Toussaint Before the Spirits (2003), opera
- Cloud Atlas (2011), cello concerto
- Song of the Silkie (2000) for baritone, string quartet, text by Laura Harrington
- Sky Above Clouds (1993) for orchestra
- Bel Canto for string quartet
- Averno for choir
- It's About Time (2015) for chamber ensemble, commissioned by the San Francisco Contemporary Music Players

== Recordings ==
- "SHIMMER" on Metamorphosen. Metamorphosen string orchestra, Scott Yoo conducting
- "TOUSSAINT BEFORE THE SPIRTS" Stephen Salters, Baritone and Opera Unlimited, Gil Rose, conducting
- “HOW SHE DANCED”: String Quartets of Elena Ruehr Performed by the Cypress String Quartet. Cypress Performing Arts Association.
- "JANE WANG CONSIDERS THE DRAGONFLY." Alexi Gonzales, Benjamin Seltzer, Sarah Brady, Heng-Jin Park, and Sarah Bob, named for insect flight expert Z. Jane Wang
- "AVERNO" Marguerite Krull, Stephen Salters, The Trinity Choir, Novus NY, and Julian Wachner, conducting
- "O'KEEFFE IMAGES" Jennifer Kloetzel, Cello, and the Boston Modern Orchestra Project, Gil Rose, conducting.
- "LIFT" Irina Muresanu, violin Ethan Filner, viola Jennifer Kloetzel, cello Sarah Bob, piano
- "SIX STRING QUARTETS" Cypress and Borremeo String Quartets with baritone Stephen Salters
- "FRESH PAINT” Radius Ensemble performance of Quetzal Garden
- "ICARUS" Borremeo, Arneis and Delgani String Quartets with clarinetists Jon Manassee and pianist Donald Berman
- "SONGS FOR STEPHEN" Baritone Stephen Salters and pianists Donald Berman and David Zobel
- "THE NORTHERN QUARTETS" QuartetES
