= Salkin =

Salkin is a surname. Notable people with the surname include:

- Allen Salkin (born ?), American investigative journalist and blogger
- Patricia Salkin (born ?), American academic, law professor, and blogger

== Other ==
- Salkin & Linoff (c. 1920s–80s), U.S. retail clothier based in Minnesota
