= Mischa Salkind-Pearl =

American classical composer

Mischa Salkind-Pearl is an American composer, keyboardist and educator based in Arlington, Massachusetts.
