= Cutler Majestic Theatre =

Historic theatre in Boston, Massachusetts

Coordinates: 42°21′05.76″N 71°03′54.36″W

- Saxon Theatre
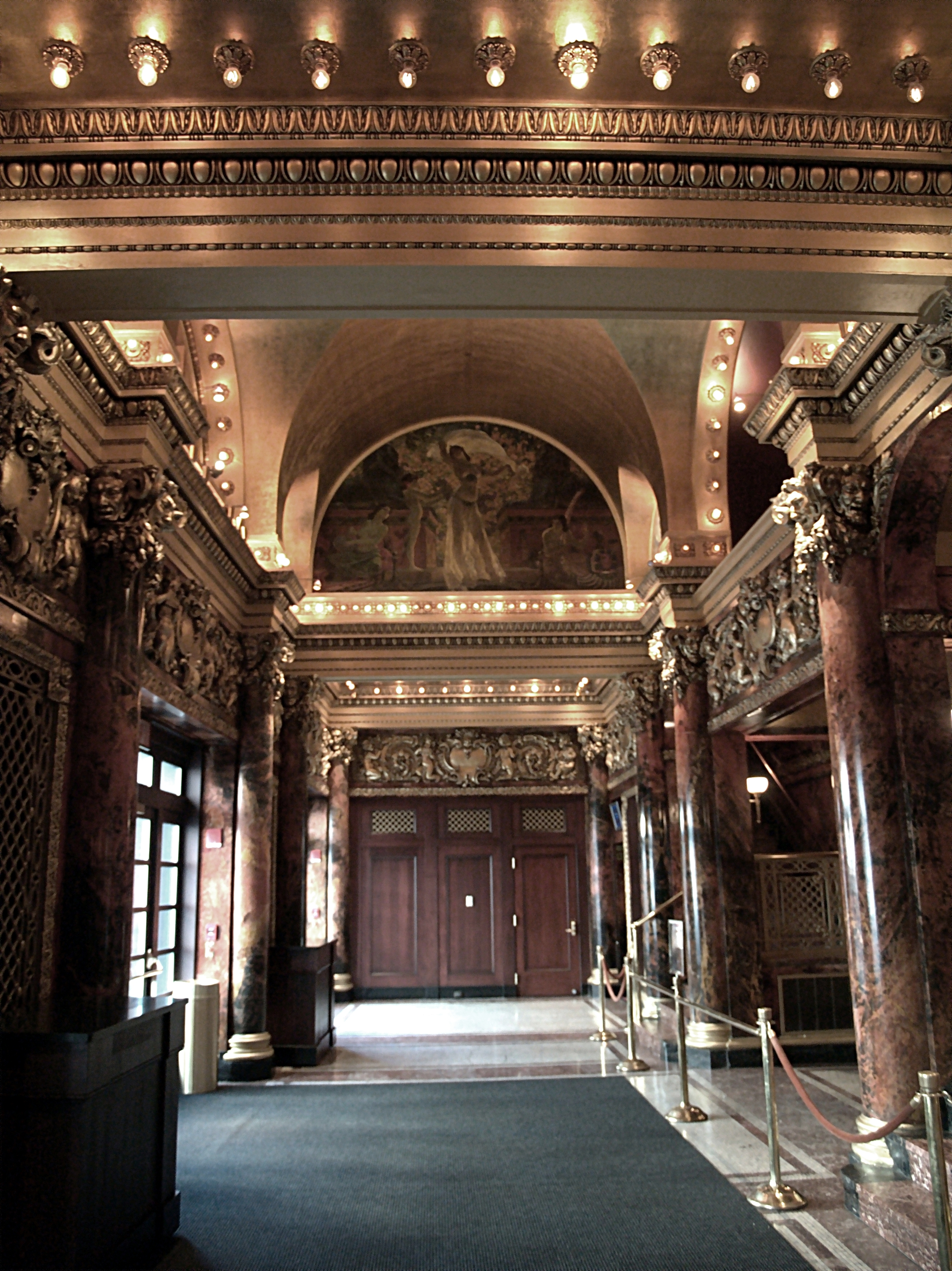
- Theatre lobby, 2009
- Interactive map of Cutler Majestic Theatre
- Address: 219 Tremont Street; Boston, Massachusetts; United States
- Owner: Emerson College
- Capacity: Approximately 1,200
- Designation: National Register of Historic Places

Construction
- Opened: 1903
- Architect: John Galen Howard

Website
- emersontheatres.org

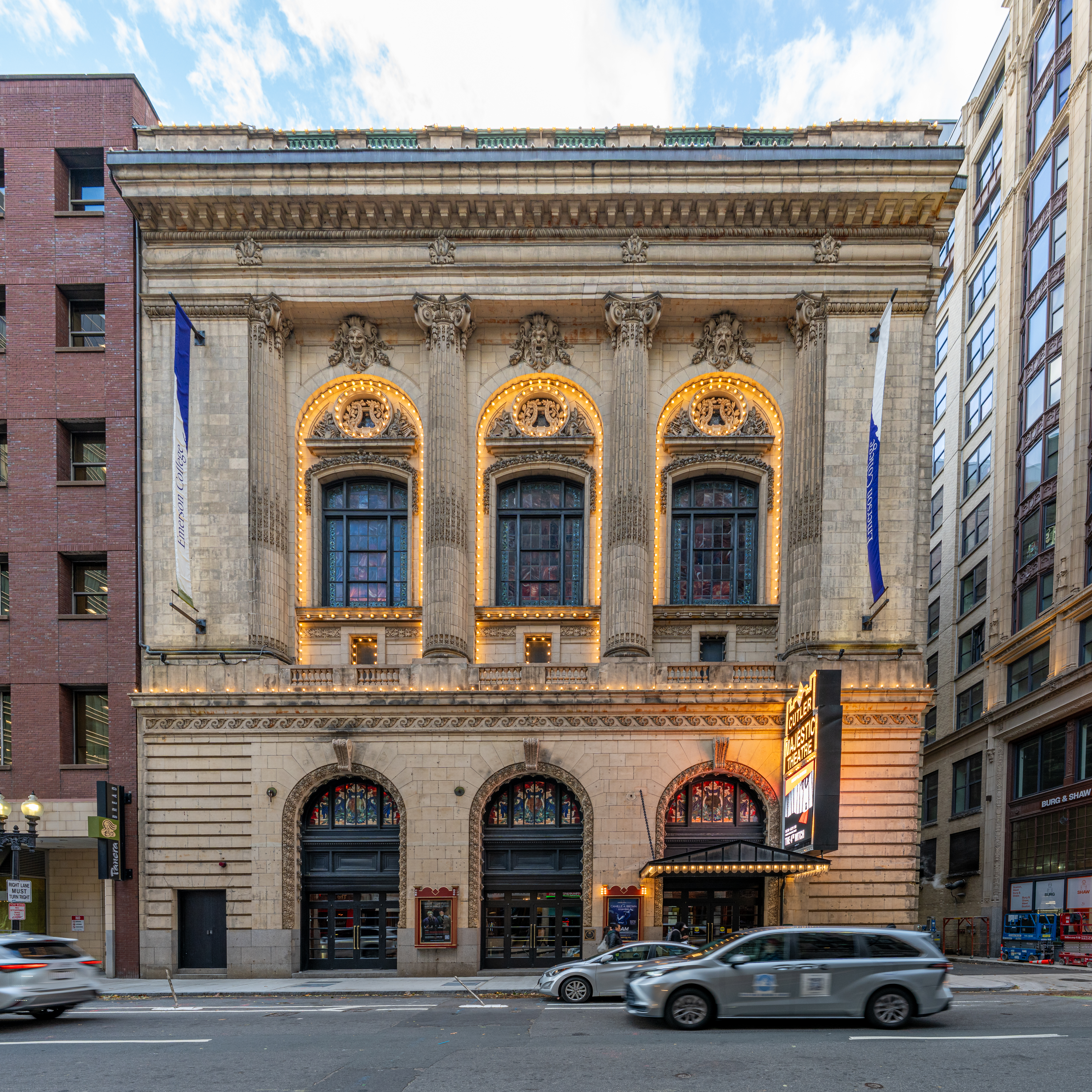
Exterior (2025)

The Cutler Majestic Theatre at Emerson College, in Boston, Massachusetts, is a 1903 Beaux Arts style theater, designed by the architect John Galen Howard. The theatre is located at 219 Tremont Street in the Boston Theater District and seats just under 1,200 people.

The theatre is a contributing property to a National Register of Historic Places district, the Piano Row District. It is also on the Massachusetts Register of Historic Places, and was designated a Boston Landmark in 1986.

== History ==
Originally built for theatre, this was one of three theaters commissioned in Boston by Eben Dyer Jordan, son of the founder of Jordan Marsh, a Boston-based chain of department stores. The Majestic was converted to accommodate vaudeville shows in the 1920s and eventually into a movie house in 1956 by Sack Cinemas. The change to film came with renovations that transformed the lobby and covered up much of John Galen Howard's original Beaux-Arts architecture.

The theater continued to show movies until 1983 as the Saxon Theatre. By then, the theater began to deteriorate both in appearance and in programming. On January 15, 1961, American Nazi Party founder George Lincoln Rockwell and a fellow Nazi Party member attempted to picket the local premiere of the film Exodus at the Saxon while staying at the Hotel Touraine directly across Tremont Street. After Boston Mayor John F. Collins (1960–1968) declined to deny Rockwell the right to picket, members of the local Jewish Defense League chapter organized a counterdemonstration of 2,000 Jewish protestors in response on the corner of Tremont and Boylston Streets on the day of the premiere, which forced police to converge on the theater and force Rockwell into a police cruiser that took him to Logan International Airport where Rockwell was then boarded a flight to Washington, DC.

In the mid-1980s, Emerson College purchased the theater and restored it to its original Beaux-Arts appearance and reopening it in 1987. The theater was again renamed in 2003, becoming the Cutler Majestic Theatre after donors Ted and Joan Benard-Cutler.

The theater today is a performing arts center for both Emerson College and the community at large. It is managed by Emerson College's Office of the Arts and is one of the regular venues of ArtsEmerson. It was the home base of Opera Boston and is now used by Boston Lyric Opera and frequently hosts performances by New England Conservatory, Teatro Lirico D'Europa, Celebrity Series of Boston, Emerson College's Emerson Stage company, and the Boston Gay Men's Chorus.
