= Odyssey Opera =

Opera company in Boston, Massachusetts

- Formation: 2013
- Founder: Gil Rose
- Type: Opera company
- Location: Boston, Massachusetts
- Website: odysseyopera.org

Odyssey Opera is an opera company based in Boston, Massachusetts. Founded in 2013 by Gil Rose, it typically begins its season with a concert performance of a large, rarely heard opera in the fall, continuing the season with fully staged renditions of early, classical, and contemporary opera. The company is known for performing "offbeat, neglected repertoire, with a special nod to those never, or rarely, performed in Boston" and New England.

== Productions ==
=== Inaugural season ===
The company's inaugural season in 2013 was launched with a concert performance of Rienzi, an opera from early in Wagner's career (but seldom performed today), followed by the "ambitious, satisfying trifecta" of Mascagni's Zanetto, Verdi's Un giorno di regno, and Wolf-Ferrari's Il segreto di Susanna.

=== Later productions ===
In 2014, its season opened with the Boston premiere of Korngold's "grandly gorgeous, melancholy masterpiece," Die tote Stadt, in a production praised for its "precision, force, and tone chemistry";. The company also put on two one-act, one-singer operas by Dominick Argento (Miss Havisham's Wedding Night and A Water Bird Talk), as well as Tobias Picker's children's opera Fantastic Mr. Fox, an adaptation of Roald Dahl's story, which was produced in collaboration with Boston Modern Orchestra Project. It completed the 2014/15 season with The British Invasion, a festival of nine British operas: Vaughn Williams's Sir John in Love, Sullivan's The Zoo, Walton's The Bear, Thomas Adès Powder her Face, Britten's Phaedra, Bennet's Ophelia, Berkely's Four Poems of St. Teresa of Avila, Weir's King Harald's Saga and Maxwell-Davies's Eight Songs for a Mad King.

Its 2015/16 season began with the "enthusiastically cheered" Boston premiere of Massenet's Le Cid at the New England Conservatory's Jordan Hall. It presented The Fisherman and His Wife as part of the Gunther Schuller Memorial Concert the following November.
