= Vivian de Sola Pinto =

British writer and historian

Vivian de Sola Pinto (9 December 1895 – 27 July 1969) was a British poet, literary critic and historian. He was a leading scholarly authority on D. H. Lawrence, and appeared for the defence (Penguin Books) in the 1960 Lady Chatterley's Lover trial.

Pinto was born and grew up in Hampstead. He became a close friend of Siegfried Sassoon, having fought in World War I alongside him, as his second-in-command, in France. He appears in the 'Sherston' books (Memoirs of an Infantry Officer etc.), Sassoon's fictionalised biography, under the pseudonym of "Velmore".

After the war he was at the University of Oxford. Later he was Professor in the Department of English at the University of Nottingham, from 1938 until 1961.

He is also known as the translator of France Prešeren's poetry into the English language.

He was the great-grandson of Rabbi David Aaron de Sola.

== Works ==
- Works of Sir Charles Sedley, with a Study of Sedley (1928)
- The Tree of Life: An Anthology (1929), editor with George Neill Wright
- Peter Sterry: Platonist and Puritan, 1613-1672 (1934)
- The Invisible Sun - poems
- Crisis in English Poetry: 1880-1940
- The Common Muse: An Anthology of Popular British Ballad Poetry 15th-20th Century, editor with Allan Edwin Rodway
- Restoration Carnival: Five courtier poets: Rochester, Dorset, Sedley, Etherege & Sheffield (1954)
- Reginald Mainwaring Hewitt: A Selection from his Literary Remains (1955)
- The Divine Vision: Studies in the Poetry and Art of William Blake (1957) editor
- Complete Poems of D. H. Lawrence (1964), editor with F. Warren Roberts
- Bulgarian Prose and Verse (1957)
- Enthusiast in Wit: A Portrait of John Wilmot, Earl of Rochester, 1647-1680 (1962)
- The Restoration Court Poets: John Wilmot, Earl of Rochester; Charles Sackville, Earl of Dorset; Sir Charles Sedley; Sir George Etheredge (1965)
- The English Renaissance 1510-1680
