= Brocard Sewell =

British Carmelite friar, priest and writer (1912–2000)

Michael Seymour Gerveys Sewell (30 July 1912 – 2 April 2000), usually now known by his religious name Brocard Sewell, was a British Carmelite friar, priest and literary figure.

== Biography ==
He was born in Bangkok, and brought up in Cornwall, England. Educated at Weymouth College (leaving at 16), he became a Catholic convert in 1931. As a young man he was involved with H. D. C. Pepler in craft printing, before testing his vocation first of all with the Dominicans, whom he left shortly before joining the Royal Air Force during World War II. Returning after the war to religious life, he was professed first of all with the Austin Canons before becoming a Carmelite friar in 1952 (and being ordained priest in 1954), remaining with the Carmelites for the rest of his life.

In a subsequent career as editor, publisher, printer and writer, he commemorated and wrote up a number of lesser literary lights: Arthur Machen, Frederick Rolfe, Montague Summers, Marc-André Raffalovich, John Gray, Olive Custance, Henry Williamson. He also wrote on distributist figures and on Eric Gill and The Guild of St Joseph and St Dominic. Using the Aylesford Review – the magazine of the monastery in which he was cloistered – he also publicised the works of some of the 1960s counterculture poets, in particular Michael Horovitz and his erstwhile wife, Frances Horovitz, who with others made many trips to Aylesford Priory during the 1960s and 1970s. Sewell, who enjoyed a close friendship with Frances Horovitz, became her confessor and confidant (the fact that she was not Roman Catholic did not prevent Sewell hearing her confession) and following her death of cancer in 1983, he became her biographer.

As noted by Oswald Mosley biographer Stephen Dorril, Sewell was himself a member of the Distributist League and the British Union of Fascists, and also befriended both Henry Williamson and Mosley himself. Later, during the 1960s, he engaged in a high-profile controversy, speaking out against the Catholic Church's teachings on contraception, but seems in many other ways to have been critical of the modernising of the Roman Catholic Church following Vatican II particularly with regard to the use of the vernacular in the Mass. Yet in other ways Sewell seems to have been curiously non-condemnatory in his evaluations of people and could also be extremely detached in assessing the contributions of those of other points of view or lifestyle, not least the Communist Harry Pollitt, whose oratory he praised, and Christine Keeler, with whom he struck up a friendship. Sewell notably criticised the treatment of Stephen Ward by the authorities during the Profumo affair of 1963, and was an opponent of nuclear weapons, finding himself, in his words, "at odds with a red hat" on account of his membership of the radical Catholic peace movement PAX. After Mosley's death in December 1980, Sewell contributed articles to Mosley's former secretary ---and Catholic convert---Jeffrey Hamm's magazine, Lodestar.

Following his pronouncements on contraception, in a letter to The Times that suggested Pope Paul VI should resign, Sewell was removed from Aylesford Priory, and lectured at St. Francis Xavier University Antigonish in Canada for several years, having first of all spent a year in partial seclusion at the erstwhile monastery of Joseph Leycester Lyne at Capel-y-Ffin in South Wales. At this point, the monastery was the private residence of Helen Davies, granddaughter of both Hilary Pepler and of Eric Gill, but by Sewell's own admission, he went there because he had been informed he was no longer "persona grata" in the diocese in which he had worked, even if the suspension of his faculties to preach and hear confessions was quickly rescinded as uncanonical. He was ultimately permitted to return to Aylesford, with which monastery he is most associated.

Brocard Sewell died on 2 April 2000, aged 87.

== Works ==
- Arthur Machen: Memories and Impressions by Adrian Goldstone, C. A. and Anthony Lejeune, Father Brocard Sewell, Maurice Spurway, Wesley D. Sweetser, Henry Williamson... Llandeilo: St Albert's Press, 1960. 350 copies. Editor
- Corvo, 1860–1960: A Collection of Essays by Various Hands. Saint Albert's Press, Aylesford, 1961 Cecil Woolf and Brocard Sewell (eds.)
- Two Friends: John Gray and Andre Raffalovich. Aylesford: Saint Albert's Press, 1963
- New Quests For Corvo, 1965, editor with Cecil Woolf
- Montague Summers: A Memoir (1965) as Joseph Jerome
- My Dear Time's Waste, Aylesford, Kent: Saint Albert's Press, 1966
- Footnote to the Nineties: A Memoir of John Gray & André Raffalovich, 1968
- The Vatican Oracle, 1970
- Cecil Chesterton, 1975
- Olive Custance: Her Life and Work. London: The Eighteen Nineties Society, 1975
- A Check-list of Books, Pamphlets, Broadsheets, Catalogues, Posters etc., printed by H.D.C. Pepler at Saint Dominic's Press, Ditchling, Sussex between the years 1916 and 1936. A.D. Ditchling Press, Sussex, 1979
- Three Private Presses: Saint Dominic's Press, the Press of Edward Walters, Saint Albert's Press Christopher Skelton, 1979
- Henry Williamson: the Man, the Writings, 1980
- Like Black Swans: Some People and Themes. London: Tabb House, 1982
- In the Dorian Mode: A Life of John Gray, 1866–1934, 1983
- Frances Horovitz, Poet: A Symposium. Aylesford Press, 1987
- Three Essays (1988) Father Vincent McNabb; A Modern Hand-Printer – Edward Walters; Voyage to a Beginning – the Introduction to Colin Wilson's autobiography
- Cancel all our Vows: Brother Joseph Gard'ner and the Servants of Christ the King (1988)
- GK's Weekly: An Appraisal (1990)
- Tell Me Strange Things: A Memorial to Montague Summers. Upton: The Aylesford Press, 1991
- The Habit of a Lifetime: An Autobiography. Padstow, Tabb House, 1992.
- The Selected Poems of Olive Custance 1995 editor
- Saint Dominic's Press. A Bibliography 1916–1937. Lower Marston: Whittington Press, (1995) Michael Taylor and Brocard Sewell.
