= Montague Summers =

English writer (1880–1948)

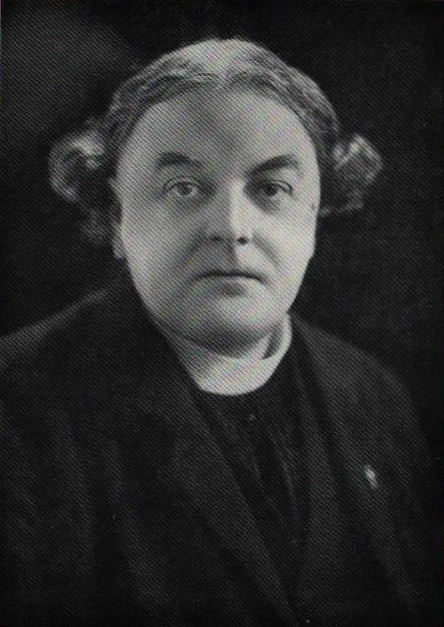
- Montague Summers c. 1925
- Born: Augustus Montague Summers; 10 April 1880; Clifton, Bristol, England
- Died: 10 August 1948 (aged 68); Richmond, Surrey, England
- Resting place: Richmond Cemetery
- Education: Trinity College, Oxford
- Occupations: Author and clergyman
- Writing career
- Pen name: Reverend Alphonsus Joseph-Mary Augustus Montague Summers
- Subjects: Restoration comedy, Gothic fiction, the occult
- Notable works: The History of Witchcraft and Demonology (1926); translation of the Malleus Maleficarum (1928); The Vampire: His Kith and Kin (1928); The Werewolf (1933)

Augustus Montague Summers (10 April 1880 – 10 August 1948) was an English author, clergyman, and teacher. As an independent scholar, he published many works on the English drama of the Stuart Restoration (1660–1688) and helped to organise and to promote the performance of plays from that period. He also wrote extensively on the occult and has been characterized as "arguably the most seminal twentieth-century purveyor of pop culture occultism."

Summers prepared for a career in the Church of England at Oxford and Lichfield, and was ordained as an Anglican deacon in 1908. He served briefly as a curate in Bitton, but his career as an Anglican clergyman was ended by a suppressed sexual scandal. In 1909 he converted to Roman Catholicism and began studying for the Catholic priesthood. After 1913 he presented himself as a Catholic priest, but he was never under the authority of any diocese or religious order in England, and it is doubtful that he was ever actually ordained. While employed as a teacher of English and Latin, he pursued scholarly work on the English theatre of the 17th century. For his contributions to that field he was elected to the Royal Society of Literature in 1916.

Noted for his eccentric personality and interests, Summers became a popular figure in London high society first for his theatrical work and later for his History of Witchcraft and Demonology, published in 1926. That work was followed by other studies on witchcraft, vampires, and werewolves, in all of which he professed to believe. In 1928 he published his translation of the 15th-century witch hunter's manual, the Malleus Maleficarum, and for decades this remained the only full English translation of that historical document. Summers also produced scholarly work on Gothic fiction and published several anthologies of horror stories. He wrote some original works of fiction, but none of them were published in his lifetime.

== Early life ==
Montague Summers was the youngest of the seven children of Augustus William Summers, a wealthy businessman and justice of the peace in Clifton, Bristol, and his wife Ellen née Bush. Augustus was a director of Lloyds Bank, chairman of Bristol United Breweries, and the head of a firm of mineral water manufacturers. Ellen was the daughter of a manager of the Warminster Savings Bank. Montague grew up in a luxurious home located next to Clifton Down and called "Tellisford House", which today is a listed building. He was educated as a day boy at the nearby Clifton College. Early on, he rebelled against his father's evangelical, low church religiosity, embracing instead a ritualistic Anglo-Catholicism. According to his biographer Brocard Sewell, there was a strain of mental illness in his mother's side of the family.

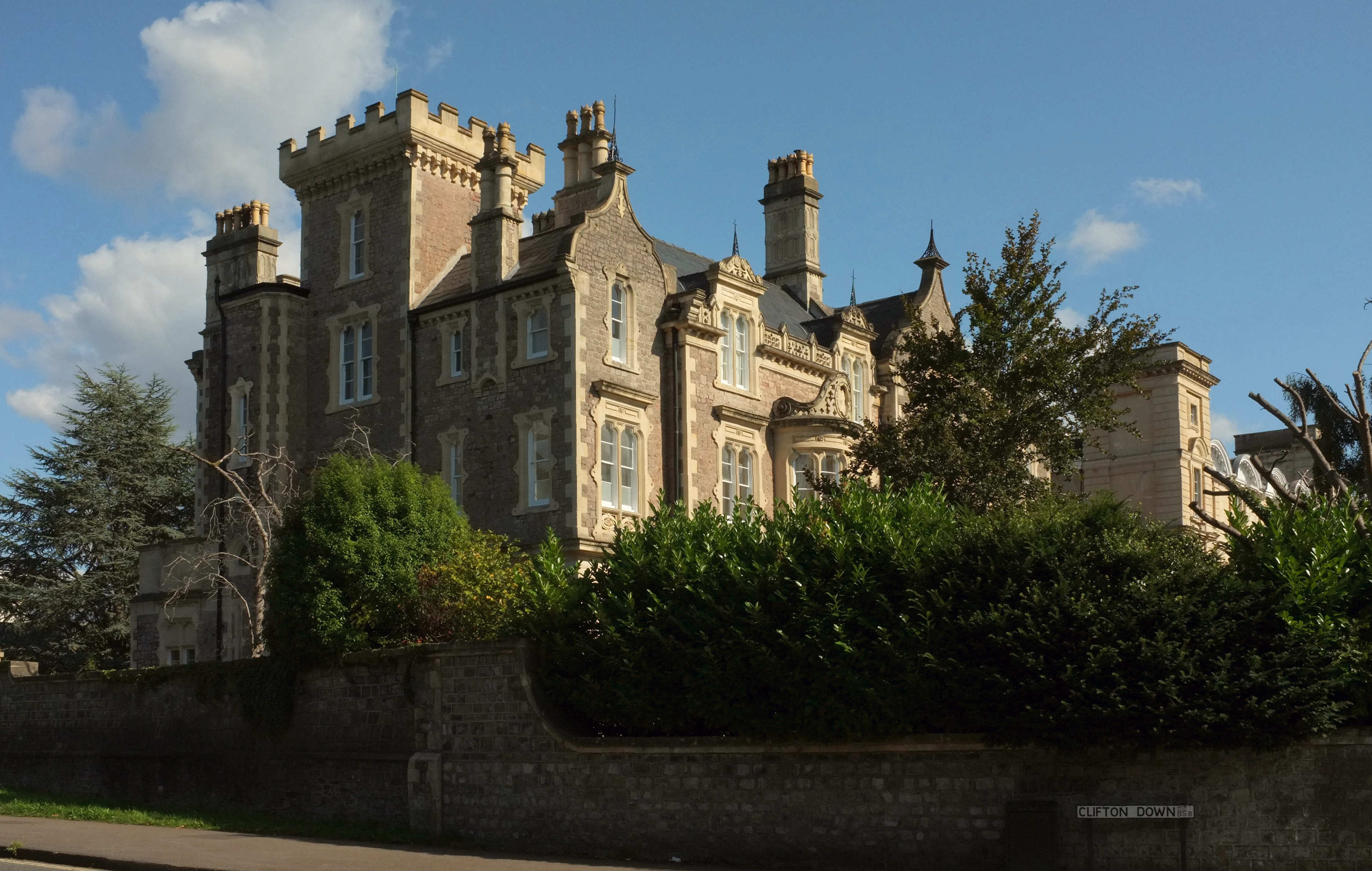
Tellisford House, Summers's childhood home, and the adjacent Trinmore, located in Clifton Down, Bristol

In 1899, Summers matriculated at Trinity College, Oxford. Although an avid reader and linguist, Summers neglected his university studies. In 1904 he received a fourth-class Bachelor of Arts (BA) degree in theology, promoted in 1906 to a Master of Arts (MA) degree, as per the custom of the University of Oxford. Summers continued his religious training at Lichfield Theological College with the intention of becoming a priest in the Church of England.

Summers self-published his first book, Antinous and Other Poems, in 1907. Its contents reflected the influence of the Decadent movement while showcasing Summers's own preoccupations with pederasty, medievalism, Catholic liturgy, and the occult. Summers dedicated that book to the writer Jacques d'Adelswärd-Fersen, who was notorious for having been convicted years earlier by a court in Paris of "inciting minors to debauchery".

=== Anglican clergyman ===
Summers was ordained as deacon in 1908 by George Forrest Browne, the Bishop of Bristol. He was then appointed as curate in Bitton, near Bristol. The vicar of Bitton was the elderly Canon Ellacombe, who could provide Summers with little supervision or guidance. When a friend from Oxford, the poet J. Redwood Anderson, visited Summers at the Bitton vicarage, he found Summers "in a thoroughly neurotic state and exhibiting a morbid fascination with evil". Summers's brief curacy ended under a cloud and he never proceeded to higher orders in the Anglican Church, apparently because of rumours of his interest in Satanism and allegations of sexual impropriety with young boys.

Summers's interest in Satanism probably derived in part from his reading of the works of the French writer Joris-Karl Huysmans, particularly the novel Là-bas (1891), which includes an account of a Black Mass. Summers himself later claimed in private conversation to have attended Black Masses in Bruges, Brighton, and London. Some of his former associates, including Redwood Anderson, claim that in his early years Summers conducted such ceremonies himself.

According to the testimonies quoted by Gerard P. O'Sullivan, Summers and another clergyman, the Rev. Austin Nelson, were accused in 1908 of attempting to seduce a choirboy in Bath. Fearing that the police might question him, Summers fled to Antwerp, in Belgium. Summers was not prosecuted and he returned to England soon thereafter. According to research published in 2026 by Prof. Jan Machielsen of Cardiff University, this may have been the same case for which Austin Pemberton Nelson was convicted by the Somerset Assizes in Taunton, in January 1910, of "an act of gross indecency with another male person" under the terms of the Labouchère Amendment. That case involved 16-year old Septimus Bailey, who was considered by the court to have been a non-consenting partner. Nelson, who had succeeded Summers as curate of Bitton in April 1909, was sentenced to eighteen months hard labour and expelled from the priesthood. Machielsen speculates that Summers may have escaped prosecution in this case due to the influence and wealth of his family.

=== Conversion to Catholicism ===
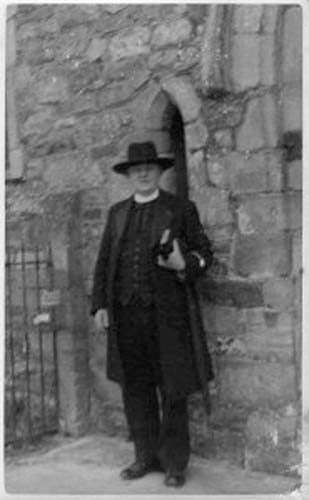
Photograph of Montague Summers in clerical dress, ca. 1935, from the collection of the Georgetown University Library (GTM110501)

In 1909, Summers converted to Catholicism and began studying for the Catholic priesthood at St John's Seminary, Wonersh, receiving the clerical tonsure on 28 December 1910. After 1913 he styled himself as the "Reverend Alphonsus Joseph-Mary Augustus Montague Summers" and acted as a Catholic priest, even though he was never a member of any Catholic order or diocese in England. After this time, he also consistently appeared in public in what Brocard Sewell described as "clerical attire reminiscent of some exotic abbé of the time of Louis Quatorze". Whether he was actually ordained as a priest is disputed.

According to some testimonies, Summers had transferred from the seminary in Wornesh to the Diocese of Nottingham, but the local bishop refused to ordain him after receiving incriminating reports of Summers's prior conduct. Some sources claim that Summers then travelled to Continental Europe and was ordained by Cardinal Mercier in Belgium or by Archbishop Guido Maria Conforti in Italy. It is also alleged that Summers was ordained as a priest by Ulric Vernon Herford, the self-styled "Bishop of Mercia and Middlesex" in the "Evangelical Catholic Communion", one of several episcopi vagantes ("wandering bishops") operating in Britain at the time.

Brocard Sewell argued that "there is a strong probability, if not a moral certainty" that Summers had been validly but perhaps illicitly ordained as a priest. Sewell gave as evidence the facts that Summers was allowed to say mass publicly when he travelled in the Continent and that Monsignor Ronald Knox, although wholly unsympathetic and opposed to Summers, regarded him as actually being a Catholic priest.

=== Work as a teacher ===
From 1911 to 1926 Summers found employment as a teacher of English, Latin, French, and history. He was an assistant master at Hertford Grammar School in 1911–1912, and then at the Junior School of the Central School of Arts and Crafts in Holborn in 1912–1922. During that time he also taught evening classes at London County Council schools. In 1922, he became senior English and Classics master at Brockley County School in south-east London. Despite his eccentric appearance and habits, he was apparently a successful and well-regarded teacher. Summers gave up teaching in 1926, after the success of his first book on witchcraft allowed him to adopt writing as his full-time occupation.

== Literary scholarship ==
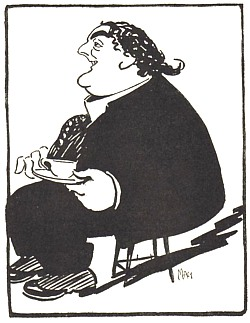
Cartoon of the Rev. Montague Summers, drawn by "Matt" (Matthew Austin Sandford) for the London Evening Standard, ca. 1925

While employed as a schoolmaster and with the encouragement of Arthur Henry Bullen of the Shakespeare Head Press, Summers established himself as an independent scholar specializing on the dramatic literature of the Stuart Restoration. In 1914 he published a critical edition of George Villiers's The Rehearsal. He then edited the plays of Aphra Behn, which appeared in 1915 in six volumes. That work was well received by other scholars and earned him election as fellow of the Royal Society of Literature in 1916.

=== Restoration drama ===
Summers helped to create a new society called "The Phoenix" that performed "old plays", including long neglected Restoration comedies, and which operated from 1919 to 1925 under the patronage of Lady Cunard and with the support of Sir Edmund Gosse. It was succeeded by the "Renaissance Theatre", which gave occasional performances until 1928. Summers wrote extensive programme notes for those productions and offered his scholarly advice during rehearsals. That work made Summers a well known and popular figure in theatrical circles. Among Summers's associates in the London theater were actor Lewis Casson and his wife Sybil Thorndike. The novelist George Moore attended many of the Phoenix performances and befriended Summers.

With the Nonesuch Press, Summers published critical editions of the collected plays of William Congreve (1923), William Wycherley (1924), and Thomas Otway (1926). With Reginald Caton's Fortune Press, Summers edited the works of Thomas Shadwell (1927). In 1931-32 there appeared his edition of the works of John Dryden, published by Nonesuch, which attracted considerable criticism from other scholars for what they identified as faulty editing of the texts and unacknowledged borrowing from other scholars in the notes. After that, Summers published no other critical editions of dramatists.

Several decades after his death, literary critic and historian Robert D. Hume characterized Montague Summers's scholarship on Restoration drama as pioneering and useful, but also as marred by sloppiness, eccentricity, uncritical deference to Edmund Gosse and other similar gentlemen-amateurs, and even occasional dishonesty. Hume judged Summers's studies on The Restoration Theatre (1934) and The Playhouse of Pepys (1935) to be particularly fruitful sources. In his own day, Summers's credibility among university-based scholars was adversely impacted by the acrimonious public disputes in which he engaged with others working in the same field, such as Frederick S. Boas and Allardyce Nicoll.

=== Gothic fiction ===
In 1917, Summers presented a lecture on Ann Radcliffe, the pioneering Gothic novelist, before the Royal Society of Literature. That same year he lectured the Society on Jane Austen in the context of the centenary of her death. In the 1920s Summers and another scholar, Michael Sadleir, rediscovered the seven obscure Gothic novels, known as the "Northanger Horrid Novels", that Austen mentioned in her Gothic parody novel Northanger Abbey. Many readers had come to suppose that the lurid titles were Austen's own invention, but Summers and Sadleir showed that they corresponded to novels published in the 1790s. Summers produced partial editions of two of those works.

Gothic fiction became the other focus of Summers's literary scholarship, in addition to Restoration drama. In 1938, Summers published a history of the Gothic novel titled The Gothic Quest, which was later praised by the French scholar André Parreaux as "a unique and valuable book, indispensable to the student of the period". A second volume of that history, to be titled The Gothic Achievement, had not been completed when Summers died in 1948. Summers's Gothic Bibliography, published in 1940, has been characterized as "flawed but useful."

Summers also compiled three anthologies of supernatural stories: The Supernatural Omnibus (1931), Victorian Ghost Stories (1933), and The Grimoire and other Supernatural Stories (1936). On the strength of that work, he has been described as "the major anthologist of supernatural and Gothic fiction" in the 1930s.

=== Poetry ===
Summers also edited the poetry of Richard Barnfield, a contemporary of Shakespeare. Summers' introduction to his 1936 edition of Barnfield's poems stressed the homosexual theme of some of those works, particularly The Affectionate Shepherd. Brocard Sewell states that Summers's introduction to The Poems of Richard Barnfield is one of the two works that Summers published on the "psychology of sex", the other being his 1920 essay on the Marquis de Sade.

== The occult ==
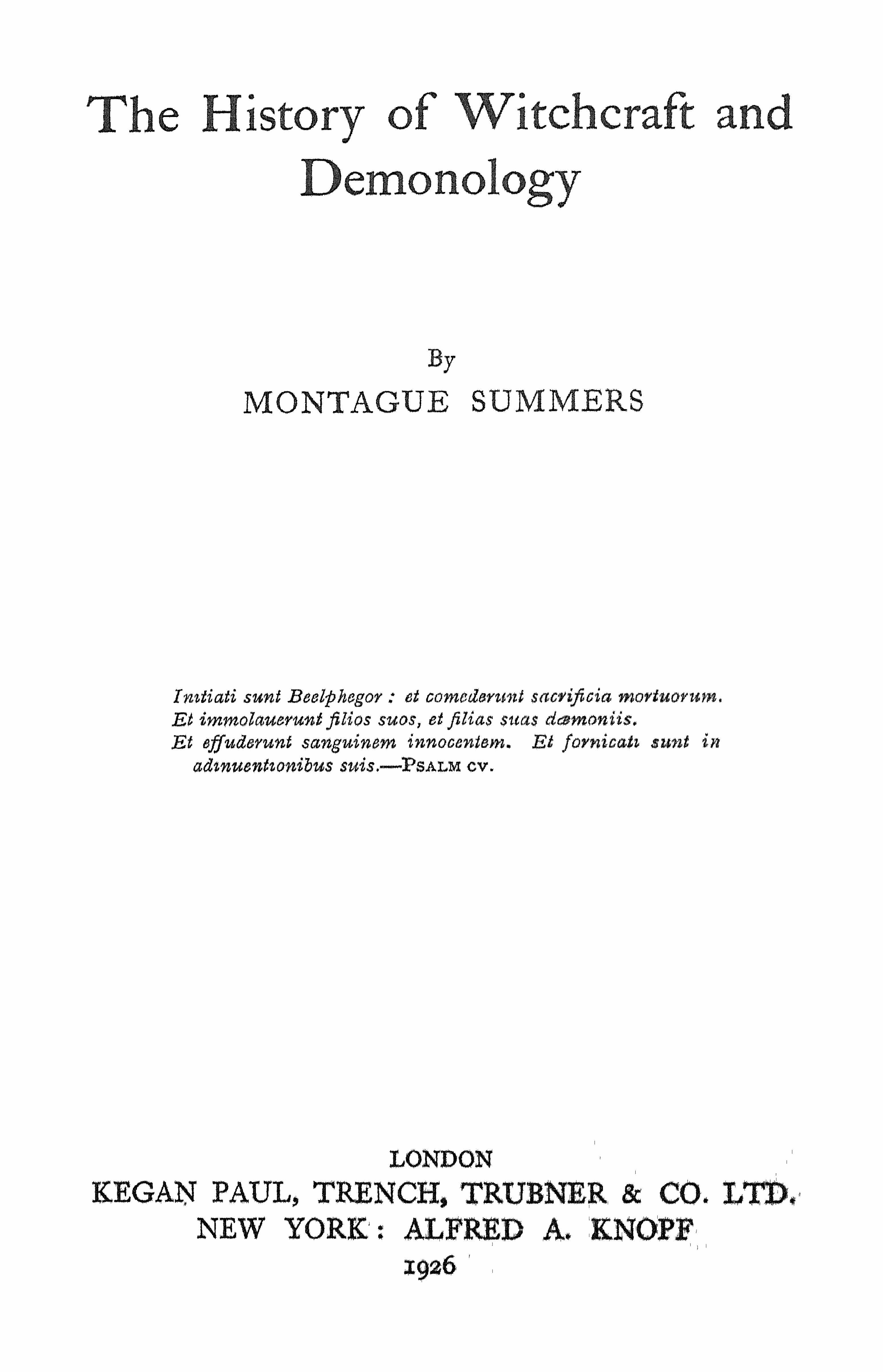
Title page of The History of Witchcraft and Demonology by Montague Summers, published in 1926 by Kegan Paul as part of the series "History of Civilization", edited by C. K. Ogden

From 1916 onwards, Summers regularly published articles in popular occult periodicals, including The Occult Review and the Spiritualist periodical Light. In 1926 his work on The History of Witchcraft and Demonology appeared as part of the "History of Civilization" published by Kegan Paul and edited by Charles Kay Ogden. In the introduction to that book, Summers wrote:

In the following pages I have endeavoured to show the witch as she really was – an evil liver: a social pest and parasite: the devotee of a loathly and obscene creed: an adept at poisoning, blackmail, and other creeping crimes: a member of a powerful secret organisation inimical to Church and State: a blasphemer in word and deed, swaying the villagers by terror and superstition: a charlatan and a quack sometimes: a bawd: an abortionist: the dark counsellor of lewd court ladies and adulterous gallants: a minister to vice and inconceivable corruption, battening upon the filth and foulest passions of the age.

The basic tenet of Summers's approach to witchcraft was Thomas Stapleton's dictum Crescit cum magia haeresis, cum haeresi magia ("Heresy grows with witchcraft, and witchcraft with heresy"). Summers presented modern spiritualism as a continuation of older forms of witchcraft and necromancy. He was especially concerned to refute the "witch-cult hypothesis" of anthropologist Margaret Murray, according to which the witch trials in the early modern period had been an attempt to suppress a pagan religion that had survived the Christianization of Europe.

Summers expressed belief in the existence of demons, their role in possession and exorcism, and other preternatural phenomena associated with their activity. However, he also argued, based on the theological views of Augustine and Aquinas, that the magical rites of witches can do no real harm to others. He considered that the testimonies according to which witches reached the place of their "sabbath" by magical flight were based on some delusion and argued that the "devil" reported to appear at such gatherings was an ordinary man in disguise, engaged in a burlesque of the ritual of the holy mass.

The History of Witchcraft and Demonology sold well and attracted considerable attention in the press, with several reviewers expressing surprise that a 20th-century scholar had written as if the persons accused during the historical witch hunts had really been guilty of the crimes attributed to them. The book's success made Summers "something of a social celebrity" and allowed him to give up teaching and write full time. In 1927 Summers published a companion volume, The Geography of Witchcraft, also as part of Ogden's "History of Civilization" series.

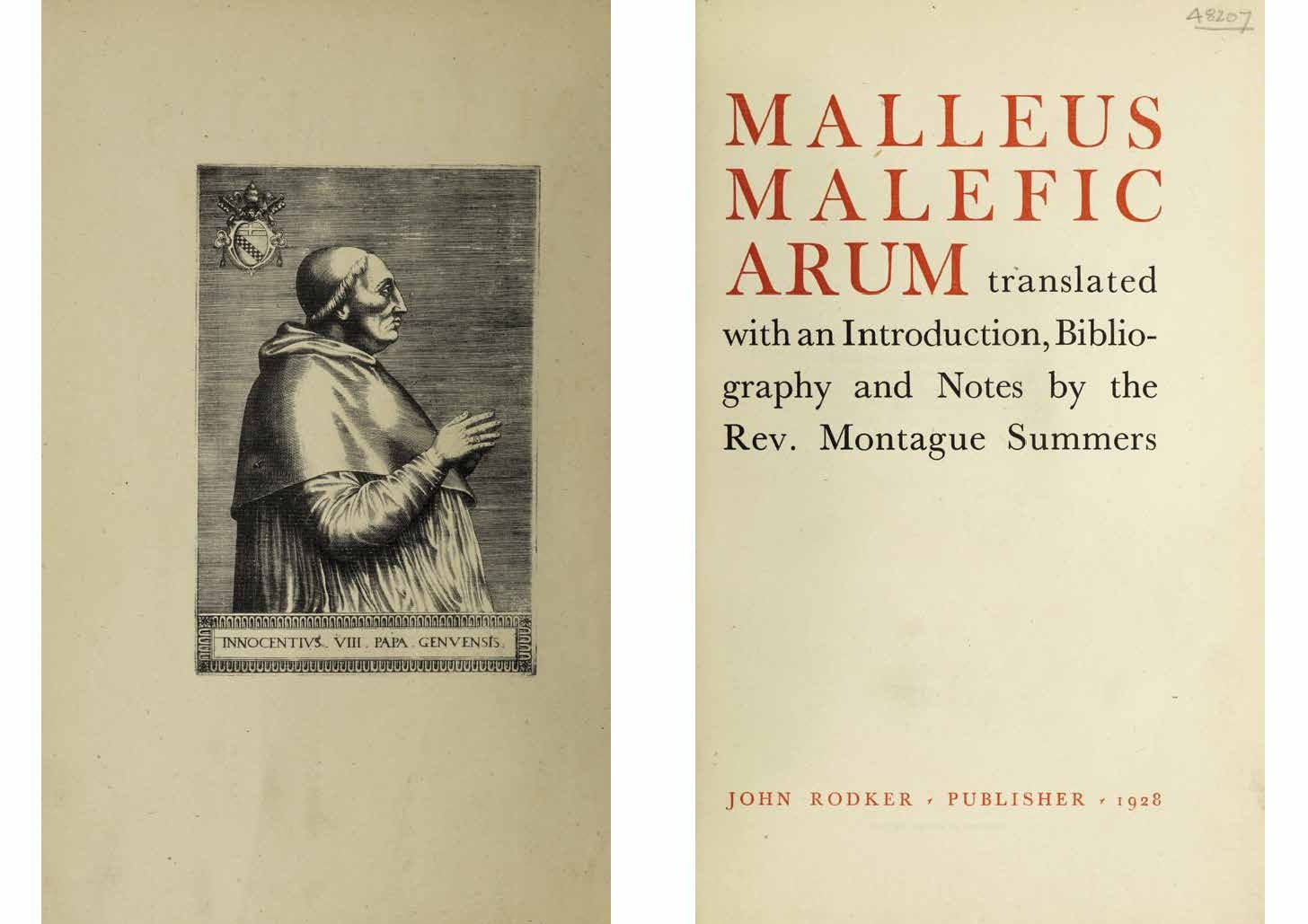
Frontispiece (depicting Pope Innocent VIII) and title page of Summers's English translation of the Malleus Maleficarum, published in 1928 by John Rodker

In 1928, Summers published the first full English translation of the Malleus Maleficarum ("The Hammer of Witches"), a Latin manual on the detection and prosecution of witches written in the 15th century by the Dominican inquisitors Heinrich Kramer and Jacob Sprenger. In his introduction, Summers insists that the reality of witchcraft is an essential part of Catholic doctrine and declares the Malleus an admirable and correct account of witchcraft and of the methods necessary to combat it. In fact, however, the Catholic authorities of the 15th century had condemned the Malleus on both ethical and legal grounds. Other Catholic scholars contemporary with Summers were highly critical of the Malleus. For instance, the Rev. Herbert Thurston's article on "Witchcraft" for the Catholic Encyclopedia of 1912, refers to the publication of the Malleus as a "disastrous episode."

After his first works on witchcraft were published, Summers turned his attention to vampires, producing The Vampire: His Kith and Kin (1928) and The Vampire in Europe (1929). According to Summers's books, his research on vampires was not exclusively bibliographical, but also drew on oral traditions that he had encountered during his travels in Greece. Summers then turned to werewolves with The Werewolf (1933).

In 1933, copies of Summers's translations of The Confessions of Madeleine Bavent and of Ludovico Maria Sinistrari's Demoniality were seized by the police due to their explicit accounts of sexual intercourse between humans and demons. At the ensuing trial of the publisher for obscene libel, anthropologist E. E. Evans-Pritchard testified in defence of the scholarly value of the works in question. The publisher, Reginald Caton, was convicted and the unsold copies destroyed.

=== Influence ===
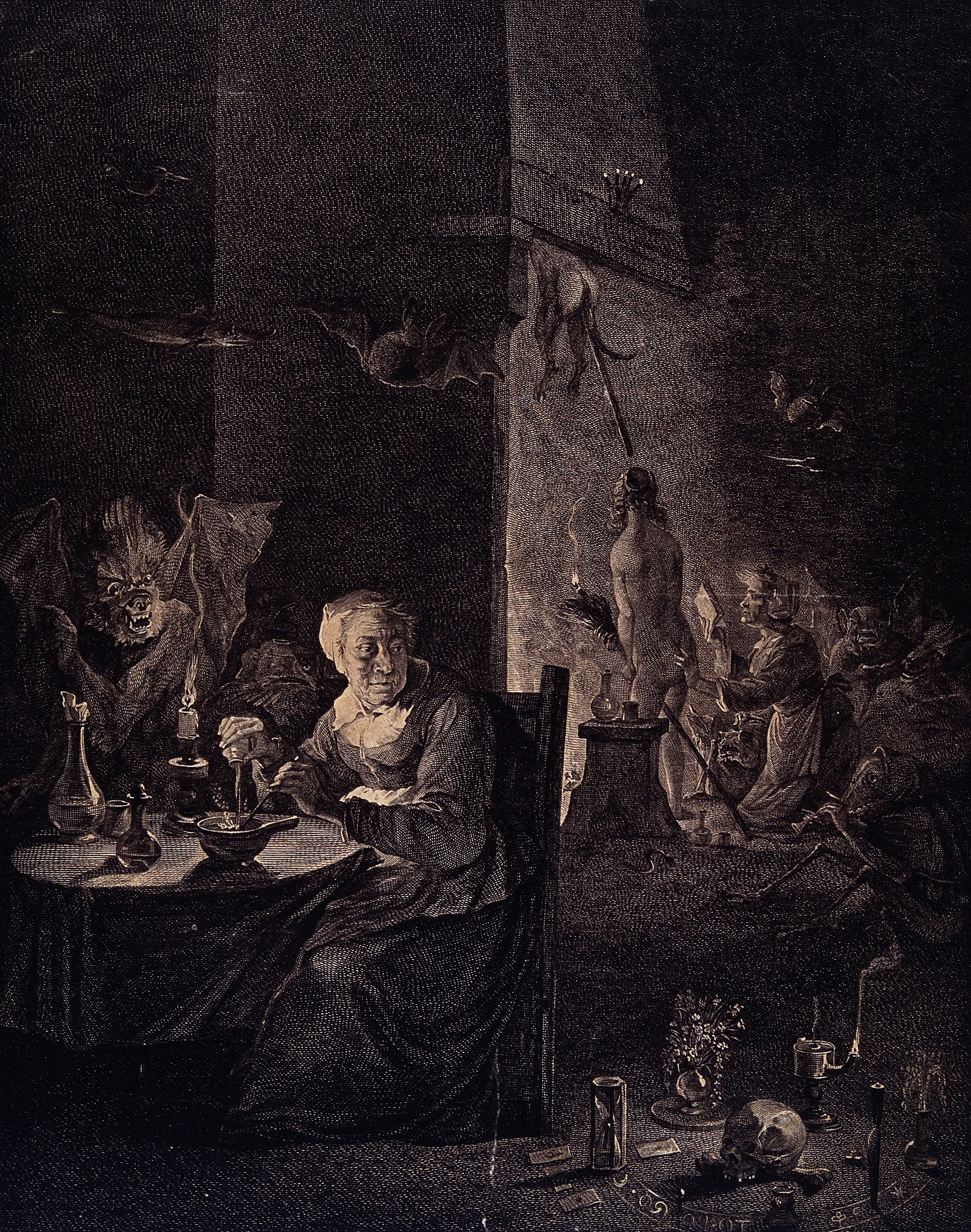
"Preparation for the Witches' Sabbath", engraving by Jacques Aliamet after a painting by David Teniers the Younger, ca. 1650. This was used by Montague Summers as a frontispiece to his History of Witchcraft and Demonology (1926).

Summers's work on the occult is notorious for his old-fashioned and eccentric writing style, his display of erudition, and his purported belief in the reality of some of the preternatural subjects of which he treats. Presented from the perspective of a highly traditionalist Catholicism, Summers's occult scholarship has actually had its greatest influence upon modern popular culture. According to historian Juliette Wood, Summers's

concern with the macabre aspects of the supernatural has a very modern feel, and the links between vampires and satanic masses, so beloved of horror films and popular exorcisms, owe much to his particular body of work. Perhaps his real legacy is that he combined all the elements of the gothic novel into an allegedly real satanism that creates a tension between reality and fiction that appeals so strongly to postmodern imagination.

According to horror genre scholar John Edgar Browning, "it is because of Summers that the modern serious study of the vampire figure exists today". On the other hand, Browning also finds that, for all their erudition, Summers's research on the occult exhibits "a curious absence of any real depth", which may explain why "a stigma has been attached to Summers's writings for almost as long as they have been in print." After Christopher S. MacKay published a full translation of the Malleus Maleficarum in 2006, historian Jonathan Seitz welcomed that new work, noting that, until then, the Malleus had "been readily available in English only in the atrocious 1928 'translation' authored by Montague Summers". Seitz added that "to dub Summers an eccentric would be to understate substantially his outsized personality, and his edition reflects his idiosyncrasies."

The prominent Catholic historian Jeffrey Burton Russell, a specialist in the religion of the European Middle Ages, wrote in 1972 that

Summers' own works and his many editions and translations of classical witchcraft handbooks are marred by frequent liberties in translation, inaccurate references, and wild surmises; they are almost totally lacking in historical sense, for Summers saw witchcraft as a manifestation of the eternal and unchanging warfare between God and Satan. Yet Summers was well steeped in the sources, and his insight that European witchcraft was basically a perversion of Christianity and related to heresy, rather than the survival of a pagan religion as the Murrayites claimed, was correct. Summers' work was erratic and unreliable but not without value.

According to Brian Doherty, Summers's later writings on witchcraft, published in the 1930s and 1940s, "adopted a far more paranoid and conspiracy-driven worldview" than his earlier works on the subject. These later writings draw extensively from earlier conspiracy theorists such as the French counter-revolutionary Abbé Augustin Barruel and the English Fascist Nesta Helen Webster. As such, Doherty argues that Summers's work may have influenced the "Satanic Panic" of the 1980s and 1990s.

=== Antisemitism ===
Summers's History of Witchcraft and Demonology (1926) gives credence to various historical accusations that European Jews kidnapped and sacrificed Christian children. Summers wrote that "the evidence is quite conclusive that the body, and especially the blood of the victim, was used for magical purposes", and concluded that it was for this "practice of the dark and hideous traditions of Hebrew magic"—and not for the Biblical Jewish faith—that Jews had been persecuted by Christians in the Middle Ages and in the early modern period. The great majority of historians now reject the view that this "blood libel" against the Jews had any basis in fact. According to historian Norman Cohn, Summers's writings on witchcraft helped to promote antisemitic tropes well after Summers's death.

== Other pursuits ==
Summers cultivated his reputation for eccentricity. The Times wrote he was "in every way a 'character' and in some sort a throwback to the Middle Ages." His biographer, Father Brocard Sewell, paints the following portrait:

During the year 1927, the striking and somber figure of the Reverend Montague Sommers in black soutane and cloak, with buckled shoes–à la Louis Quatorze–and shovel hat could often have been seen entering or leaving the reading room of the British Museum, carrying a large black portfolio bearing on its side a white label, showing in blood-red capitals, the legend 'VAMPIRES'.

Summers wrote works of hagiography on Catherine of Siena, Anthony Maria Zaccaria, and other Catholic saints, but his primary religious interest was always in the occult. While Aleister Crowley, with whom he was acquainted and whose career he followed closely, adopted the persona of a modern-day sorcerer, Summers played the part of a learned Catholic witch-hunter. Despite his conservative religiosity, Summers was an active member of the British Society for the Study of Sex Psychology (BSSSP), to which he contributed an essay on the Marquis de Sade in 1920. Summers also appears to have been a member of the Order of Chaeronea, a secret society of homosexual men that was established by George Cecil Ives, another member of the BSSSP, and which was active between the 1890s and the 1920s.

In 1926, Summers advertised in the London Times for a secretary to assist him with his literary work. A young Cyril Connolly responded, but found Summers uncongenial and turned down the position. Connolly privately mocked Summers in blank verse as "a sorcerer / a fruity unfrocked cleric of the Nineties / Like an old toad that carries in his head / The jewel of literature, a puffy satyr / That blends his Romish ritual with the filth / Scrawled on Pompeian pavement."

The posthumously published personal diaries of socialite and later Conservative politician Sir Henry Channon relate how Channon first met Summers at a dinner party in Summers's honour given by Lady Cunard in January 1928. Channon's diaries then relate a series of visits to Summers's home in Richmond. Channon recounts that, on more than one occasion and at Channon's suggestion, Summers took Channon upstairs to his private chapel after dinner and beat him over the altar. Channon characterized Summers as a "lecherous priest", "a madman", and "as dangerous as he is brilliant", cutting off contact with him after a couple of months.

Summers lived in Oxford from 1929 to 1934, where he often worked at the Bodleian Library and attended high mass at Blackfriars. He collaborated with a number of student dramatic productions and became the object of much attention and gossip among Oxford University undergraduates, who regarded him as "a kind of clerical Doctor Faustus".

The popular novelist Dennis Wheatley relates that he was introduced to Summers by the journalist and politician Tom Driberg while Wheatley was researching occultism for his novel The Devil Rides Out (1934). A weekend visit by Wheatley and his wife to Summers's home in Alresford was cut short by the Wheatleys, who determined "never to see the, perhaps not so Reverend, gentleman again". Summers and Wheatley continued to correspond on friendly terms, but Wheatley reportedly based the character of the evil Canon Copely-Syle, in his novel To the Devil – a Daughter (1953), on Montague Summers. Timothy d'Arch Smith has argued that the characters of Dr. Trelawney and Canon Paul Fenneau in Anthony Powell's twelve-volume novel sequence A Dance to the Music of Time (1951–1975) are based, respectively, on Aleister Crowley and Montague Summers.

According to Fr. Brocard Sewell, Summers was the only English member of the Société J.-K. Huysmans of Paris, which was dedicated to the legacy of the French novelist and critic Joris-Karl Huysmans. In 1943, the Fortune Press published an English translation of Huysmans's novel Là-bas, edited and annotated by Summers.

Summers wrote several original works of fiction, but none of these were published during his lifetime. The unpublished manuscripts include two plays: William Henry: A Play in Four Acts and Piers Gaveston (whose text is now lost and whose title is sometimes listed as Edward II). A number of ghost stories and a short novel, The Bride of Christ, were found among Summers's papers and published long after his death.

== Relations with the Catholic Church ==
Although he presented himself as an uncompromising defender of Catholic orthodoxy, the great majority of Summers's books on religious subjects were not published with the approval of Catholic authorities (see nihil obstat and imprimatur). The exception to this was his translation of Saint Alphonsus Liguori's The Glories of Mary, which appeared in 1938 with the imprimatur of the Archdiocese of Paris. In particular, Summers's work on witchcraft was not sanctioned by any church authority and it attracted very negative public comment from an important Catholic scholar, the English Jesuit Herbert Thurston, who wrote in 1927 that

Nothing could serve Satan’s purpose better than that the Catholic Church, his most uncompromising opponent, should be identified once more with all the extravagant beliefs and superstitions of the witch mania [...] It really plays into his hands; first, because it makes the Church ridiculous by attributing to her a teaching flagrantly in conflict with sanity and common sense; and, secondly, because it is associated with stories of all sorts of nastiness which feed a prurient curiosity under cloak of supplying scientific information.

Father Thurston also called attention to the fact that Summers did not figure in any English register as either an Anglican or a Catholic priest, but was instead a literary figure with distinctly Decadent tastes. According to Bernard Doherty, Thurston may have been concerned that Summers's writings on witchcraft could have been a "mystification" akin to the Taxil hoax of the 1890s, intended to bring ridicule upon the Catholic Church. Thurston publicly challenged Summers to show that he was really an ordained priest, which Summers failed to do. Bernard Doherty notes that, although Summers's belief in the preternatural reality of witchcraft was at odds with the skepticism of Fr. Thurston and other Catholic commentators, it was closer to the views expressed by some prominent English Catholic intellectuals of his day, such as G. K. Chesterton and Hilaire Belloc.

According to Fr. Brocard Sewell, Summers was well known but also generally mal vu among English Dominicans in the 1920s and 1930s. In 1938 both Mons. Ronald Knox and Douglas Woodruff objected to having their own essays published in a collection on Great Catholics edited by Fr. Claude Williamson, after they learned that the book would also include an essay by Summers on John Dryden. Shortly after Summers's death in 1948, the Catholic Herald published a statement by the Diocese of Southwark to the effect that Summers had, many years earlier, been a student for the priesthood but that, as far as was known, he had not been ordained. Fr. Sewell, although convinced that Summers had been a priest, declared that his "clerical life seems to have had more in common with the strange semi-fantasy world of the episcopi vagantes than with that of a normal priest."

In the early 1930s, Summers acted as a private chaplain to Mrs. Ermengarde Greville-Nugent, the widow of Patrick Greville-Nugent, son of Anglo-Irish aristocrat and politician Lord Greville. Mrs. Greville-Nugent was a prominent neo-Jacobite and founder of the Anglican Society of King Charles the Martyr before her conversion to Roman Catholicism. Both her only daughter and her husband had died insane, and she was convicted of fraud in 1934 for obtaining money to keep up her elegant lifestyle by writing deceptive begging letters to people whose names had appeared in the newspapers as recent beneficiaries of wills. The Catholic Bishop of Southwark, Peter Amigo, excommunicated Mrs. Greville-Nugent for allowing Summers to celebrate mass in the private oratory at Kingsley Dene, her home in Dulwich.

== Death and posterity ==
Montague Summers died suddenly at his home, 4 Dynevor Road, Richmond, on 10 August 1948, at the age of 68. The Catholic rector of his parish, St Elizabeth of Portugal Church, refused a public requiem mass, but conducted instead a private graveside ceremony. Summers was buried in Richmond Cemetery, dressed in his priest's vestments and with the coat of his dog Tango. His grave remained unmarked until the late 1980s, when Sandy Robertson and Edwin Pouncey organised the "Summers Project" to raise money for a gravestone. It now bears his favoured phrase "tell me strange things".

Summers bequeathed his estate and papers to his long-time personal secretary and companion Hector Stuart-Forbes. This legacy was valued at £10,000 (the equivalent of about £300,000 in 2024). Stuart-Forbes was already seriously ill and died in 1950, aged 45. He was buried in the same unmarked plot as Summers. An autobiography, written by Summers in early 1948 and titled The Galanty Show, was posthumously published in 1980. That book covered only the literary and theatrical side of the author's career and left much unrevealed about his life.

The Carmelite friar and man of letters Brocard Sewell wrote a short biography of Summers, published in 1965 under the pseudonym "Joseph Jerome". Some years later, Timothy d'Arch Smith produced a comprehensive bibliography of Summers's writings, including his contributions to periodicals. In the June 2008, Gerard P. O'Sullivan rediscovered many of Summers's personal papers in Manitoba, where they had been kept by members of Stuart-Forbes's family. Those papers are now in the collection of the Georgetown University Library. Rebecca Rego Barry recounted O'Sullivan's discovery in the January 6, 2010 issue of Fine Books & Collections Magazine. In 2026, the first book-length study of Summers's life and work appeared: John F. Wirenius's Montague Summers, Occultist: A Study of the Writings on Witches, Vampires and Werewolves, published by McFarland & Co.

== Works ==
=== Books on the occult ===
- The History of Witchcraft and Demonology, 1926 (reprinted ISBN 9780415568746)
- The Geography of Witchcraft, 1927 (reprinted ISBN 0-7100-7617-7)
- The Vampire, His Kith and Kin, 1928 (reprinted by Senate in 1993 as simply The Vampire)
- The Vampire in Europe: A Critical Edition, 1929 [2011] (reprinted ISBN 0-517-14989-3) (reprinted with alternate title: The Vampire in Lore and Legend ISBN 0-486-41942-8), edited by John Edgar Browning
- The Werewolf, 1933 (reprinted with alternate title: The Werewolf in Lore and Legend ISBN 0-486-43090-1)
- A Popular History of Witchcraft, 1937
- Witchcraft and Black Magic, 1946 (reprinted ISBN 1-55888-840-3, ISBN 0-486-41125-7)
- The Physical Phenomena of Mysticism, 1947

=== Poetry and drama ===
- Antinous and Other Poems, 1907
- William Henry (play), 1939, unpublished
- Piers Gaveston (play), 1940, unpublished

=== Fiction anthologies edited by Summers ===
- The Supernatural Omnibus, 1931
- Victorian Ghost Stories, 1933
- The Grimoire and Other Supernatural Stories, 1936

=== Other books ===
- St. Catherine of Siena, 1903
- Lourdes, 1904
- A Great Mistress of Romance: Ann Radcliffe, 1917
- Jane Austen, 1919
- St. Antonio-Maria Zaccaria, 1919
- Essays in Petto, 1928
- Architecture and the Gothic Novel, 1931
- The Restoration Theatre, 1934
- The Playhouse of Pepys, 1935
- The Gothic Quest: a History of the Gothic Novel 1938
- A Gothic Bibliography 1941 (copyright 1940)
- Six Ghost Stories (1938, not published until October 2019)
- The Bride of Christ and Other Fictions (posthumous, 2020)
- The Galanty Show (1948, published posthumously in 1980)

=== As editor or translator ===
- Works of Mrs. Aphra Behn, 1915
- Complete Works of Congreve, 1923
- Complete Works of Wycherley, 1924
- The Castle of Otranto by Horace Walpole, 1924
- The Complete Works of Thomas Shadwell, 1927
- Covent Garden Drollery, 1927
- Horrid Mysteries by the Marquis de Grosse 1927 (part of an incomplete edition of the Northanger Horrid Novels).
- The Necromancer; or, The Tale of the Black Forest by 'Ludwig Flammenberg' 1927 (part of an incomplete edition of the 'Northanger Horrid Novels').
- Demoniality by Ludovico Maria Sinistrari, 1927
- The Malleus Maleficarum of Heinrich Kramer and Jacob Sprenger, 1928
- The Discovery of Witches, 1928 by Matthew Hopkins (reprinted ISBN 0-404-18416-2)
- Compendium Maleficarum by Francesco Maria Guazzo, translated by E.A. Ashwin, 1929
- Demonolatry by Nicolas Remy, translated by E.A. Ashwin, 1930
- The Supernatural Omnibus, 1931 (reprinted ISBN 0-88356-037-2)
- Dryden: The Dramatic Works, 1931–32
- Victorian Ghost Stories, 1936
- The Poems of Richard Barnfield, 1936
- The Complete Works of Thomas Otway, 1936

== Sources ==
- d'Arch Smith, Timothy (1983). Montague Summers, a Bibliography (2 ed.). Wellingborough: Aquarian Press. ISBN 0850303176.
- Jerome, Joseph (1965). Montague Summers: A Memoir. London: Cecil and Amelia Woolf. This publication was limited to 750 numbered copies. "Joseph Jerome" is a pseudonym of the Carmelite priest and literary scholar Brocard Sewell.
- Frank, Frederick S. (1988). Montague Summers: A Bibliographical Portrait. London: Scarecrow Press. ISBN 0810821362.
