= Sherston =

Sherston may refer to:

- Sherston, Wiltshire, a village in England
- Sherston Software, publisher of educational games
- The Sherston trilogy, a series of books by Siegfried Sassoon
