= The Old Huntsman =

1917 poetry book by Siegfried Sassoon

The Old Huntsman And Other Poems
- First edition
- Author: Siegfried Sassoon
- Language: English
- Published: 1917
- Publisher: William Heinemann
- Publication place: England
- Pages: 109
- Text: The Old Huntsman And Other Poems online

The Old Huntsman and Other Poems is a 1917 collection of poems by Siegfried Sassoon. It contains one of the famous poems of Sassoon, "The Death-Bed."

== Contents ==
- THE OLD HUNTSMAN
- WAR POEMS: 1915–1917
  - Absolution
  - To My Brother
  - The Dragon and the Undying
  - France
  - To Victory
  - When I'm among a Blaze of Lights
  - Golgotha
  - A Mystic as Soldier
  - The Kiss
  - The Redeemer
  - A Subaltern
  - In the Pink
  - A Working Party
  - A Whispered Tale
  - 'Blighters'
  - At Carnoy
  - To His Dead Body
  - Two Hundred Years After
  - They
  - Stand-to: Good Friday Morning
  - The Choral Union
  - The One-Legged Man
  - Enemies
  - The Tombstone-Maker
  - Arms and the Man
  - Died of Wounds
  - The Hero
  - Stretcher Case
  - Conscripts
  - The Road
  - Secret Music
  - Before the Battle
  - The Death-Bed
  - The Last Meeting
  - A Letter Home
- LYRICAL POEMS: 1908–16
  - Nimrod in September
  - Morning Express
  - Noah
  - David Cleek
  - Ancestors
  - Haunted
  - Blind
  - Villon
  - Goblin Revel
  - Night-Piece
  - A Wanderer
  - October
  - The Heritage
  - An Old French Poet
  - Dryads
  - Morning-Land
  - Arcady Unheeding
  - At Daybreak
  - Dream-Forest
  - A Child's Prayer
  - Morning-Glory
  - To-day
  - Wonderment
  - Daybreak in a Garden
  - Companions
  - A Poplar and the Moon
  - South Wind
  - Tree and Sky
  - Alone
  - Storm and Sunlight
  - Wind in the Beechwood
  - Wisdom
  - Before Day
