= Jean Moorcroft Wilson =

British academic

Jean Moorcroft Wilson is a British academic and writer, best known as a biographer and critic of First World War poets and poetry.

A lecturer in English at Birkbeck, University of London, she has written a two-volume biography of Siegfried Sassoon, as well as works on Virginia Woolf, Charles Sorley, Robert Graves, Isaac Rosenberg and William Watson. Her husband was the publisher Cecil Woolf (died 10 June 2019).

== Works ==
- I Was an English Poet: Biography of Sir William Watson (1981)
- Virginia Woolf, Life and London: A Biography of Place (1988)
- Leonard Woolf: Pivot or outsider of Bloomsbury (1994)
- Virginia Woolf's London (2000)
- The Selected Poems of Isaac Rosenberg (editor) (2003)
- Siegfried Sassoon: The Making of a War Poet, A Biography (1886-1918) (1999)
- Siegfried Sassoon: The Journey from the Trenches 1918-1967 (2004)
- Isaac Rosenberg: The Making of a Great War Poet (2007)
- Siegfried Sassoon: Soldier, Poet, Lover, Friend (2014)
- Edward Thomas: from Adlestrop to Arras: A Biography (2015)
- Robert Graves: From Great War Poet to Good-bye to All That (1895-1929) (2018)
