= Wesley D. Sweetser =

American journalist

Wesley Duaine Sweetser (1919–2006) was an American literary scholar.

Born in National City, California, United States, he attended the University of Colorado, where he gained a Ph.D. for a thesis on Welsh writer Arthur Machen.

His enthusiasm for Machen led him to publish a valuable biography of the author based on his earlier thesis and, with Adrian Goldstone, a Machen bibliography. He played an important part in supporting the 1960s revival in Machen's works.

Sweetser also served for a long period in the United States Air Force, reaching the rank of major.

== Works ==
- Arthur Machen: Essays by Adrian Goldstone, C. A. and Anthony Lejeune, Father Brocard Sewell (editor), Maurice Spurway, Wesley D. Sweetser, Henry Williamson. Llandeilo: St. Albert's Press, 1960.
- Sweetser, Wesley D. Arthur Machen. Twayne Publishers, 1964.
- A Bibliography of Arthur Machen by Goldstone, Adrian H.; Sweetser, Wesley D. University of Texas, Austin, Texas, 1973.
- Ralph Hodgson — a Bibliography by Wesley D. Sweetser. Garland, New York, 1980.
