= Sherston trilogy =

3 volume fictionalized auto-biography

The Sherston trilogy is a series of books by the English poet and novelist Siegfried Sassoon, consisting of Memoirs of a Fox-Hunting Man, Memoirs of an Infantry Officer, and Sherston's Progress. They are named after the protagonist, George Sherston - a young Englishman of the upper middle-class, living immediately before and during the First World War.

The books are, in fact, 'fictionalised autobiography', wherein the only truly fictional things are the names of the characters. Sassoon himself is represented by Sherston. A comparison of the Sherston memoirs to Sassoon's later, undiluted autobiographical trilogy (The Old Century, The Weald of Youth, and Siegfried's Journey) shows their strict similarity, and it is generally accepted that all six books constitute a composite portrait of the author, and of his life as a young man. (Sassoon remarked, however, that his alter-ego personified only one-fifth of his actual personality. Unlike his author, Sherston has no poetic inclinations; nor does he deal with homosexuality, which was illegal at the time Sassoon was writing.)

The Sherston trilogy won high acclaim, and Memoirs of a Fox-Hunting Man took the Hawthornden Prize for Literature for 1928. The three books were printed together in one volume, The Memoirs of George Sherston, in 1937.
