= David Cuthbert Thomas =

Welsh soldier

Second Lieutenant David Cuthbert Thomas (16 June 1895 – 18 March 1916) was a Welsh soldier of the British Army who served during the First World War. He is best known for his association with the poet Siegfried Sassoon, and after his death became the subject of some of the greatest war poems by Sassoon and Robert Graves.

== Biography ==
Thomas was the son of Evan and Ethelinda Thomas of Llanedi Rectory, Pontarddulais, Glamorgan, and was educated at Christ College, Brecon. His first commission was as a second lieutenant in the 3rd Battalion, Royal Welch Fusiliers. That regiment also included the writers Robert Graves and Siegfried Sassoon, with whom he became close friends. After training, Thomas was posted to the regiment's 1st Battalion, which was then serving on the Western Front and attached to the 22nd Brigade, itself part of the 7th Infantry Division. On 18 March 1916 Thomas was leading a working party to repair wire emplacements in no man's land at the Citadel, near Fricourt in France when he was shot in the throat. He then walked to a first aid post for treatment but died soon afterwards after he began choking. He is buried at New Military Cemetery at Fricourt (reference D3 in Point 110). Graves wrote the poem 'Not Dead' in Thomas's memory and Thomas also appears in Graves' autobiography Good-Bye to All That, Sassoon's 'Sherston trilogy' of fictionalised autobiographies (as "Dick Tiltwood") and several other poems by both men.

Another eulogy came from the pen of Robert Graves in his dedicated poem, Goliath and David ("for D.C.T., killed at Fricourt, March 1916"). In his anthology, Fairies and Fusiliers (1917), he allegorises the biblical king David’s triumph over the Philistine giant and contrasts it with David Thomas’ unfortunate death. He concludes the poem with, ‘One cruel backhand sabre-cut, “I’m hit! I’m killed!” young David cries, Throws blindly forward, chokes…and dies. And look, spike-helmeted, grey, grim, Goliath straddles over him.’
