= Joseph Leycester Lyne =

Anglican Benedictine monk (1837–1908)

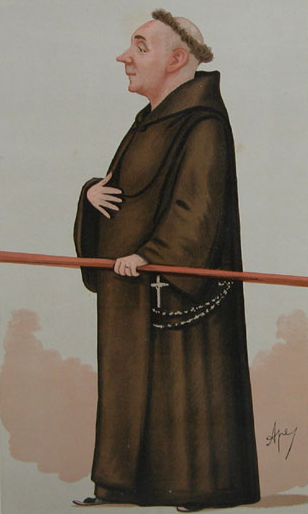
Father Ignatius, by Carlo Pellegrini, 1887

Joseph Leycester Lyne, known by his religious name as Father Ignatius of Jesus (23 November 1837 – 16 October 1908), was an Anglican Benedictine monk. He commenced a movement to reintroduce monasticism into the Church of England.

== Early life ==
Lyne was born in Trinity Square, in the parish of All Hallows-by-the-Tower, London, on 23 November 1837. He was the second son of seven children of Francis Lyne, merchant of the City of London, by his wife Louisa Genevieve (d. 1877), daughter of George Hanmer Leycester, of White Place, near Maidenhead, Berkshire, who came of the well-known Cheshire family, the Leycesters of Tabley. In October 1847 Lyne entered St Paul's School, London, under Herbert Kynaston. In 1852 he suffered corporal punishment for a breach of discipline. His biographer, Baroness Beatrice de Bertouch, four years before his death, described it as the event, "which not only endangered his life" but also "was the cause of a distressing condition of nerve collapse, the effects of which he feels to this day". Bertouch saw it as "the culminating link in a heavy chain of influences, and one which was destined to throw a strange psychological glamour over the entire atmosphere of this devotional and emotional career." He was removed, and his education was completed at private schools in Spalding and Worcester. He early developed advanced views of sacramental doctrine.

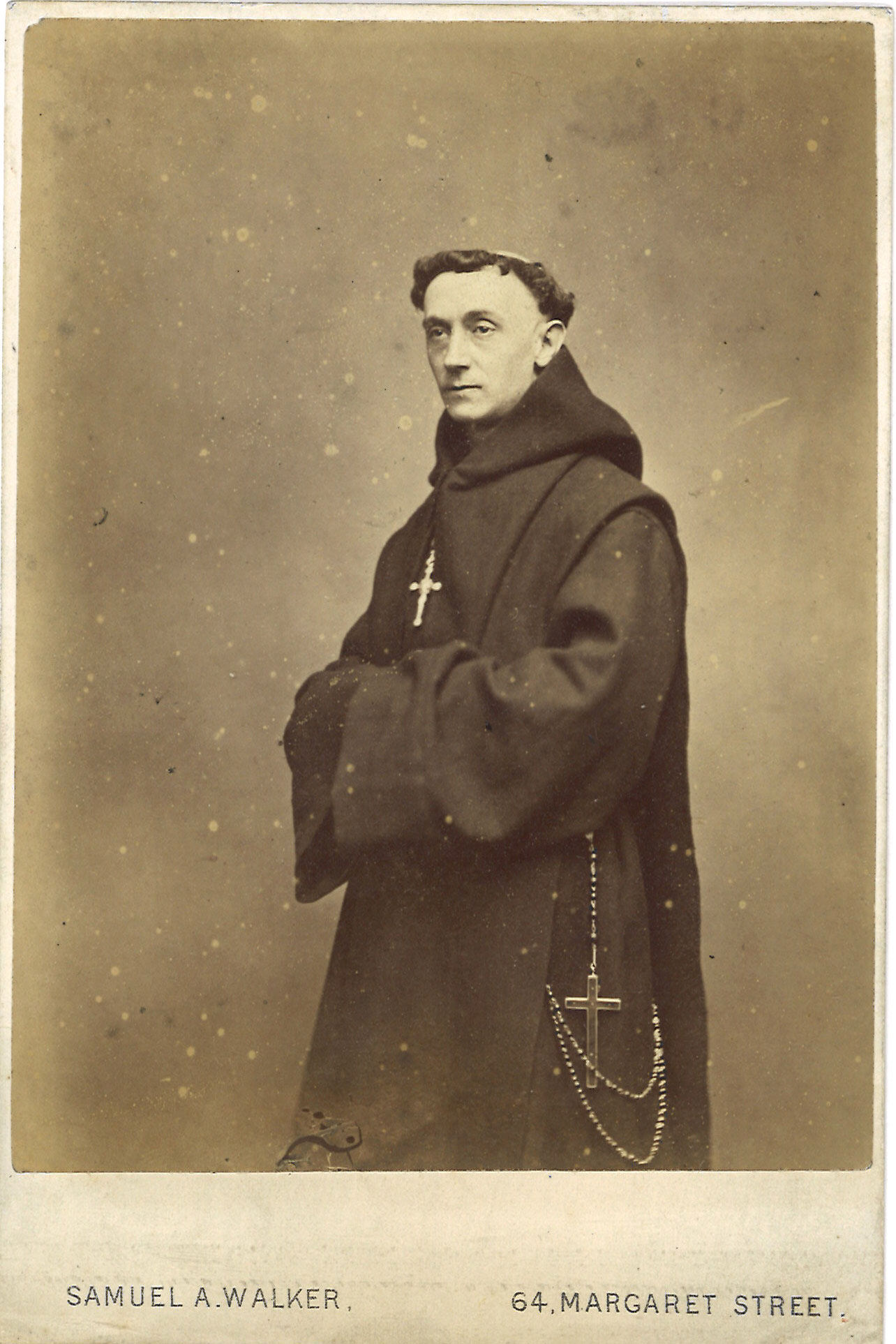
Ignatius of Llanthony

== Ministry ==
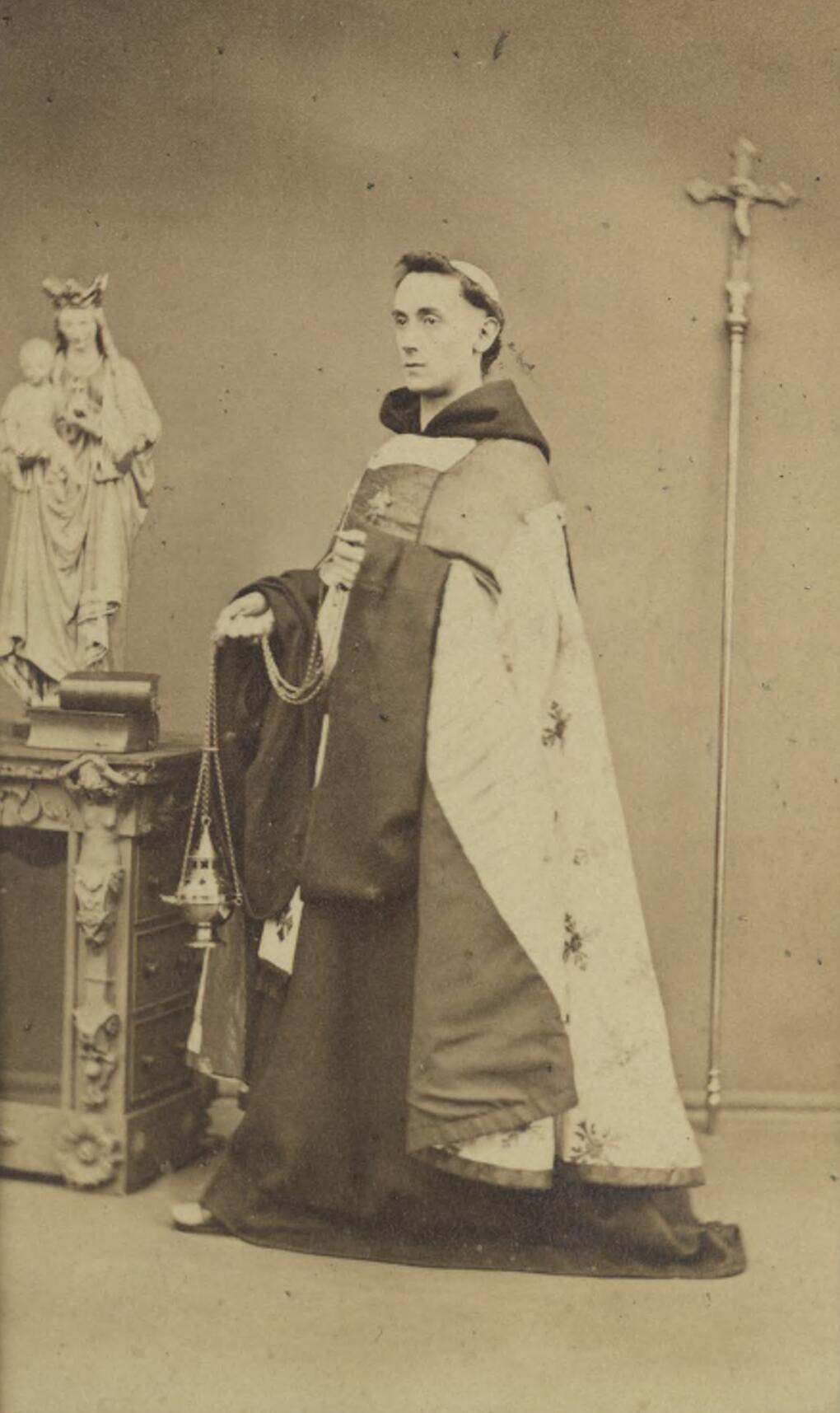
Portrait of Father Ignatius c.1865

An acquaintance with Bishop Robert Eden procured Lyne's admission to Trinity College, Glenalmond. There he studied theology under William Bright, and impressed the warden, John Hannah, by his earnest piety. After a year's lay work as catechist in Inverness, where his eccentricity and impatience of discipline brought him into collision with Bishop Eden, Lyne was ordained into the diaconate in 1860, on the express condition that he should remain a deacon and abstain from preaching for three years. He became curate to George Rundle Prynne, vicar of St Peter's, Plymouth, and soon started a guild for men and boys, called the Society of the Love of Jesus, with himself as superior. Prynne, to Lyne's mother, wrote: "He was animated by a very true spirit of devotion in carrying out such work as was assigned to him; and his earnest and loving character largely won the affections of those among whom he ministered." In Plymouth, Lyne formed two friendships which were very important in his future career; these two friends were Edward Bouverie Pusey and Priscilla Lydia Sellon. According to Bertouch, these two were "the ghostly foster-parents of the monk's vocation, or at any rate of its consummation". Almost up to his death, Pusey was the chosen administrator of the Sacrament of Penance to Ignatius. Pusey was his "friend, his confidant, his arbitrator in all situations difficult." This Society grew to about forty members. Lyne went to Pusey and Sellon for advice about it. Sellon, with Pusey's encouragement, loaned him a house to begin his community life on a monastic pattern. He was encouraged by Sellon, and largely influenced by Pusey, who presented him with his first monastic habit. With two Brothers, he took possession of this house, but the existence of the community was cut short by Lyne's serious illness. In Bruges, Belgium, where he went to convalesce, he studied the Rule of Saint Benedict. On his return in 1861 he replaced Alexander Heriot Mackonochie as curate of St George in the East, London, and took charge of St Saviour's mission church. Now convinced of his monastic vocation, he assumed the Benedictine religious habit. The innovation was challenged by Charles Lowder, founder of the Society of the Holy Cross, his ritualist vicar, and after nine months Lyne resigned rather than abandon his monastic dress.

In 1862 Lyne, who henceforth called himself Father Ignatius, issued a pamphlet in favour of the revival of monasticism in the Church of England. This publication excited vehement controversy. Together with one or two kindred spirits Lyne formed in Claydon, Suffolk, a community, which was frequently menaced by Protestant violence. His reasons were strong and clear.

Souls are perishing by thousands close to our doors. The Church of England, as she is at present, is wholly unable to grapple with the task. . . . Communities of men — call them colleges, monasteries, or whatever you please — appear to be the most suitable for the object in view. These men should be unmarried and altogether unshackled by earthly cares and domestic ties. Such establishments must be governed by rule. The rule of St. Benedict has received universal sanction, and the veneration of thirteen centuries. It is suitable in almost every way for all ages and times, and is consistent with the most faithful loyalty to the English Church. (Note: "Brother Ignatius". The Guardian. 26 October 1864. p. 1031.)

The specific objectives of this order were:

1. The restoration of the ascetic life and continual prayer in the Church of England;
2. home mission work, by preaching, visiting the poor, and teaching the young;
3. to afford a temporary religious retreat for the secular clergy;
4. to raise the tone of devotion in the English Church to a higher standard by showing the real exemplification of the evangelical counsels;
5. to aid in bringing about the union of Christendom. (Note: Kalendar of the English Church for the Year 1867. London. 1867. p. 185.)

There were three orders within the Community. The First Order, to whom the above objects apply, observed the Rule of St. Benedict in its integrity. The novitiate lasted, first for six months, then for four, then for two, then for the year, until the novice was considered really called by God to take the life vows. The Second Order consisted of men and women living in the world, and yet leading in their own homes a strictly religious life, using a prescribed dress, reciting the canonical day hours according to the Benedictine Use, and also observing the five rules of the Third Order. This Third Order consisted of men, women and children bound by solemn promise to obey five definite rules regulating:

1. Their attendance at the holy mysteries of the Church;
2. Self-examination;
3. The use of a prayer on behalf of the Society;
4. The giving of alms; and
5. Obedience to the Superior.

The Bishop of Norwich, John Pelham, refused him a licence to preach and subsequently inhibited him. In 1863 Lyne acquired premises on Elm Hill, Norwich, in face of local opposition. Special masses were celebrated for the community by the sympathetic vicar in St Laurence's Church, Norwich, at Lyne's instigation, produced further conflicts between him and the bishop. Lyne's appeal for support to Bishop Samuel Wilberforce only elicited a recommendation of submission. (Note: Ashwell, Arthur R; Wilberforce, Reginald G (1882). Life of the right reverend Samuel Wilberforce, DD Lord Bishop of Oxford and afterwards of Wichester: with selections from his diaries and correspondence (PDF). Vol. 3. London, GB: John Murray. pp. 165–167. OCLC 24191118. Archived from the original on 15 June 2006.) Forcing himself upon public notice by addressing the Bristol Church Congress of 1863, he could only secure a hearing through the interposition of Bishop Charles Ellicott. His life in Norwich was varied by a mission to London and by quarrels within the community. In 1866, owing to a flaw in the title-deeds, Lyne found himself dispossessed of his Elm Hill property, and he moved to a house in Chale, Isle of Wight, lent him by Pusey. In 1867 he moved to Laleham and in Feltham nearby he started another Anglican religious order, a Benedictine enclosed convent for women, who subsequently entered into full communion with the Roman Catholic Church.

From 1866 to 1868 he preached regularly at St Bartholomew's Moor Lane Church and other London churches. His conduct was so extravagant, however, that he was suspended, from officiating or preaching in the Diocese of London, by Bishop Archibald Tait; "owing in part to the action taken by [Ignatius] in respect to a lady whom he proposed to 'solemnly excommunicate from our Holy Congregation'."

In 1869 Lyne purchased land near Capel-y-ffin in the Black Mountains, Wales, and built Llanthony Abbey, four miles further up the valley from Llanthony Priory. The cost of the building, which remained incomplete, was defrayed by friends and the pecuniary returns of Lyne's mission preaching. Accounts of miracles and supernatural visitations enhanced the local prestige of the monastery, of which Ignatius constituted himself abbot. But the life of the community never ran smoothly. Few joined the order; in many cases those who joined soon fell away. In 1873 Lyne was summoned before Vice-chancellor Sir Richard Malins for detaining Richard Alfred J Todd, a ward in chancery, as a novice at Llanthony, and was ordered to release the young man. His difficulties were increased by family quarrels. His father, who had persistently opposed his son's extreme Anglican practices, repudiated him altogether after his mother's death in 1877, and publicly denounced his conduct and doctrines. (Note: Leycester, Augustus A (1886). "The Other Side": Being the Award of Mr. Augustus A. Leycester ... in the Matter of the Arbitration between Mr. Francis Lyne and the Rev. Jos. Leycester Lyne: with Introduction. London, GB: E. W. Allen. OCLC 163624153.)

Ignatius combined the profession of a cloistered monk with the activities of a wandering friar. When the churches were closed to him, he appeared in lecture halls and theatres, and impressed the public everywhere by his eloquence. On 12 December 1872 he appeared as the champion of Christianity in an interesting public encounter with Charles Bradlaugh, founder of the National Secular Society, in the Hall of Science in Old Street, London. From 1890 to 1891, he made a missionary tour through Canada and the United States where he was cordially invited to preach in the churches of many denominations; but his zeal for heresy-hunting was not appreciated by the Episcopal Church of America. (Note: Father Michael (1893). Father Ignatius in America. page not cited.) On his return he initiated a petition to the archbishops and convocation for measures against historical criticism of the scriptures; and at the Birmingham Church Congress of 1893 he denounced future Bishop of Oxford Charles Gore for his 1890 essay "The Holy Spirit and inspiration" in Lux Mundi. (Note: Gore, Charles (1890). "The Holy Spirit and inspiration" (PDF). In Gore, Charles (ed.). Lux mundi, a series of studies in the religion of the incarnation (10th ed.). London, GB: John Murray. pp. 315–362. LCCN 28004992. OCLC 79442849. Archived from the original on 17 July 2008.)

On 27 July 1898, Lyne, an ordained deacon in the Church of England but "unable to receive orders in his own church" for over three decades, was ordained priest by Joseph René Vilatte. Rene Kollar wrote, in Oxford Dictionary of National Biography, that "for a time" Lyne "dreamed of establishing a British Old Catholic church." Years earlier, in 1890–1891, while Lyne was on his tour of North America raising funds for his work in England, The Cambrian wrote that his order "is not a Catholic Order, nor a Church of England exactly, but an offshoot of the High Church movement associated with the idea of a revival of the [a]ncient British Church"—which Joanne Pearson in Wicca and the Christian Heritage, calls a "literary fantasm"—and his abbey church conducts some services in Welsh. The Cambrian noted that had Lyne addressed the 1889 National Eisteddfod of Wales, in Brecon, on behalf of the Welsh language and of the Ancient British Church and also admitted a Druid, taking the bardic name Dewi Honddu, by the Archdruid Clwydfardd; and had spoken for the rights of the Ancient Welsh Church at the English Church Congress held at Cardiff, by the permission of the Bishop of Llandaff. Pearson argues that "concern with ancient, indigenous religions emerging and operating independently of the Church of Rome characterises the heterodox Christian churches of the episcopi vagantes in England, Wales and France" and "was a theme that was to influence the development of Druidry and Wicca." She believes, based on accounts published during his tour of him being the "Druid of the Welsh Church" and "belonging to an Ancient British Church, older than any except Antioch and Jerusalem", Lyne may have been part of another episcopus vagans', Richard Williams Morgan, recreated Ancient British Church, given its overtones of Welsh nationalism and links to neo-druidism.It was, according to Desmond Morse-Boycott, in Lead, Kindly Light, his accepting ordination "at the hands of a wandering (Old Catholic) bishop, who was an adventurer" that discredited him with the Church of England which "denied him the priesthood".

De Bertouch wrote that Vilatte also consecrated Ignatius as a mitred Abbot, but whether this is so is not clear. In Catholic practice the conferring of abbatial status is closely analogous to the consecration of a bishop – in that both procedures involve conferring a mitre and crozier on the cleric concerned – and therefore the term "consecration" does not imply anything other than a kind of formal induction to an abbatial post. Suggestions that Vilatte went even further and consecrated Ignatius a bishop have been discounted by Peter Anson a leading authority on episcopi vagantes, who says that Vilatte did nothing other than ordain Ignatius to the priesthood, making it clear that Ignatius refused to consider being raised to the episcopate, even though it is equally certain that Vilatte did offer to consecrate him. Anson, who was at one time a monk under Aelred Carlyle at Caldey, wrote extensively on the Llanthony and Caldey Anglican monastic experiments, and describes the Baroness de Bertouch's hagiographic book (for which Ignatius himself furnished much information) as being one that "reads like fiction").

According to Kollar, Ignatius eventually also became a Zionist, British Israelite, and a believer in the flat earth theory.

== Contemporary description ==
Lyne was heavily ridiculed by many of his contemporaries, though the Anglican diarist Francis Kilvert described him in his 2 September 1870 diary entry about Kilvert's visit to the Chapel House farm:

He struck me as being a man of gentle simple kind manners, excitable, and entirely possessed by the one idea. [...] His head and brow are very fine, the forehead beautifully rounded and highly imaginative. The face is a very saintly one and the eyes extremely beautiful, earnest and expressive, a dark soft brown. When excited they seem absolutely to flame. He wears the Greek or early British tonsure all round the temples, leaving the hair of the crown untouched. His manner gives you the impression of great earnestness and single-mindedness. [...] Father Ignatius thinks every one is as good as himself and is perfectly unworldly, innocent and unsuspicious. He gave the contractor £500 at first, took no receipt from him. And so on. The consequence is that he has been imposed upon, cheated and robbed right and left.

But Kilvert also described in his 15 July 1870 diary entry that Lyne's brother, Clavering Lyne, told him about "some of the extraordinary visions which had appeared to [...] Ignatius, particularly about the ghosts which come crowding round him and which will never answer though he often speaks to them. Also about the fire in the monastery chapel at Norwich, that strange unearthly fire which Father Ignatius put out by throwing himself into it and making the sign of the cross."

== Controversies ==
David Hilliard wrote in Victorian Studies that an "Anglo-Catholic underworld" produced groups "whose members delighted in religious ceremonial and the picturesque neo-Gothic externals of monastic life." Hilliard wrote that those groups did not enforce strict criteria for entry and "it is likely that they were especially attractive to homosexually inclined young men who felt themselves drawn to the male environment of a monastic community and the dramatic side of religion." An example cited by Hilliard was an incident, published on 17 September 1864 in the Norfolk News, (Note: "Ignatius and his Singing Boys". Norfolk News. 17 September 1864.) that occurred at Elm Hill Priory in which a monk, Brother Augustine, wrote a love letter to a boy, an apprentice printer, who sang in the choir. The allegations horrified Norwich. The newspaper included the following passage in an editorial about the situation published a week later:

We tell "Ignatius" plainly, and we tell everybody else connected with this establishment who has the slightest power of reflection, that the herding together of men in one building, with the occasional letting in of young girls—some of them morbid, some of them silly and sentimental—and of boys likewise, with soft, sensitive temperaments, cannot fail to produce abominations.

A year later the community at Elm Hill Priory was almost destroyed when James Barrett Hughes, known as Brother Stanislaus, rebelled against Lyne's authority, then fled with a boy, Francis George Nobbs, who eventually became known as ex-monk Widdows, from the Guild of St William. In 1868 Hughes became a popular guest speaker at Protestant platforms in London and other places, where he scandalised his audiences with revelations of the "semi-Popish and improper practices" of Ignatius and other ritualists. The Saturday Review published an account of one such meeting that was held in London, noted inconsistencies in his story, called Hughes a novice "in the art of reasoning", and congratulated "the devotees of Exeter Hall on having found an orator so entirely worthy of them as the converted novice, Mr James Barrett Hughes; and Father Ignatius on having got rid of a monk and created an enemy, who seems to be even madder than himself." At a different meeting in London, two Norwich youths "made frightful charges, utterly unfit for publication, against a monk" which Hilliard wrote were a reference to Brother Augustine. Another case was revealed on 18 February 1869, in the Marylebone Police Court, while both men were summoned, on charges of drunkenness and disorder in the public street, the magistrate gathered that both lived some six years back at the Elm Hill Priory and had a sexual relationship. Hughes was in charge of St William's Guild, of which Nobbs was a member. Bertouch wrote that Nobbs "was reported to have affirmed that not only had the Superior [Ignatius] been aware of their degeneracy, but that he had condoned and encouraged it, by performing on their behalf, and in his own church, a ceremony which in itself was blasphemy and sacrilege of the most revolting kind." Bertouch also wrote: "This was the digest of the accusation, and it needed no more to set the Protestant world ablaze with joy and expectation."

== Death, and the fate of the Abbey ==
Joseph Leycester Lyne died in Camberley on 16 October 1908, and was buried in Llanthony Abbey. The abbey was left to the few remaining monks, subject to the right of an adopted son, William Leycester Lyne; in 1911 it passed into the hands of the Anglican Benedictine community of Caldey Island. At one point, an Anglican priest, one Father Richard Courtier-Forster was appointed to succeed Ignatius as Abbot, but following the ordination of Ignatius' designated Prior Asaph Harris by Vilatte, the Abbot-designate resigned and all real hope of regularising the Llanthony Benedictines as an Anglican foundation ended. Father Asaph Harris lived on until 1960. The Caldey Benedictines collectively submitted to Rome in 1913 and the Llanthony monastery eventually passed into the hands of Eric Gill, the sculptor and typographer.

The monastery has a later religious association in that it was, for two years or so, the home of the controversial Carmelite friar and writer Father Brocard Sewell, who withdrew there after he had written to The Times questioning Catholic teaching on birth control and criticising the encyclical Humanae Vitae; as things turned out, no sanction was ever imposed on Fr Sewell either by the Prior Provincial of his Order or the local bishop. Sewell considered his stance a matter of conscience and subsequently published a book The Vatican Oracle (1970) detailing his views.

Fr Ignatius's abbey church, which was never completed, fell into disrepair before the Gill family arrived and the roof was removed during the 1930s. In 1967 responsibility for its upkeep was transferred to a new ecumenical body, the Father Ignatius Memorial Trust, of which Fr Brocard Sewell was a founder member. Extensive restoration work was subsequently carried out on both the surviving abbey walls and Ignatius's grave within. As the structure was fundamentally unsound, this work has been only partially successful, and at the time of writing (April 2018) public access is denied.

The Father Ignatius Memorial Trust also cares for the statue of the Blessed Virgin commemorating her alleged apparitions at the monastery in August and September 1880, as well as the memorial Calvary opposite the site of the related ‘holy bush’. A considerable collection of archives and artefacts has been assembled under the auspices of the Trust, most of which is housed at the Abergavenny Museum; the tabernacle which formerly stood on the high altar of the abbey church and various pictures are cared for by the present owners of the monastery but are not normally on view.

Ignatius's effort to revive monasticism in England bore little fruit. His persuasive oratory and his courage in the face of persecution were combined with extravagance of conduct and an impatience of authority which rendered him unable to work even with sympathisers. The Order of St Benedict founded by Ignatius was not a revival of the Rule of Saint Benedict; Ignatius was independent and erratic, his rules were eclectic.

== Works or publications ==
- Ignatius, Father, O.S.B. (1870). The Holy Isle: a legend of Bardsey (poetry). London, GB: G.J. Palmer. OCLC 50912277.
- Brother Placidus, and why he became a Monk. Brighton, GB: J. Bray. 1870. OCLC 561398825.
- Lyne, Joseph L (1886). Smedley, Joseph V (ed.). Mission Sermons. London, GB: W. Ridgway. hdl:2027/uc2.ark:/13960/t03x84n83. OCLC 647092062.
- Lyne, Joseph L (1871). Leonard Morris, or the Benedictine Novice. London, GB. OCLC 56486720.
- Lyne, Joseph L (1889). Smedley, Joseph V (ed.). Jesus only. London, GB: W. Ridgway. OCLC 561415512.
- Ouida; Father Ignatius (February 1891). "Has Christianity Failed?". The North American Review. 152 (411): 209–233. ISSN 0029-2397. JSTOR 25102134. LCCN 04012673.
