= Cecil Woolf =

Publisher and writer

- In Italy during the Second World War
- Born: 20 February 1927
- Died: 10 June 2019 (aged 92)
- Military career
- Allegiance: United Kingdom
- Branch: British Army
- Rank: Captain
- Unit: Royal Tank Regiment
- Conflicts: Italian campaign (World War II)

Cecil James Sidney Woolf (1927–2019) was an English author and publisher. He was a nephew of the Woolfs of the Bloomsbury Group and lived in Hammersmith and Mornington Crescent. During the Second World War, he joined the Royal Tank Regiment, fought in Italy and rose to the rank of Captain.

== Life ==
He was the son of Philip Woolf and his wife Barbara Lownds, brought up on the Rothschild Waddesdon estate where his father was the manager. He was educated at Stowe School, and then enlisted in the Royal Tank Regiment at the age of sixteen, fighting in the Italian campaign and rising to the rank of Captain. Leaving the army in 1947, he worked for Woolf, Christie stockbrokers and then became a bookseller.

Woolf was the husband of biographer Jean Moorcroft Wilson, who was general editor of the "War Poets" series of monographs that he published. He was himself named after his father's brother, Cecil Nathan Sidney Woolf, who wrote poetry and was killed at Cambrai in the First World War. His father had been wounded by the same shell which killed his namesake.

Woolf died on 10 June 2019, at the age of 92.

== Selected publications ==
- Woolf, Cecil.A Bibliography of Norman Douglas (Rupert Hart-Davis, 1954);
- Woolf, Cecil.A Bibliography of Frederick Rolfe Baron Corvo (Rupert Hart-Davis, 1957);
- Rolfe, Frederick, Brocard Sewell, and Cecil Woolf. 1961. Corvo, 1860-1960. A Collection of Essays by Various Hands to Commemorate the Centenary of the Birth of Fr. Rolfe, Baron Corvo. Edited by Cecil Woolf and Brocard Sewell and with an Introduction by Pamela Hansford Johnson. Pp. xiv. 155. Saint Albert's Press: Aylesford.
- Woolf, Cecil.The Clerk without a Benefice. A study of Fr. Rolfe, Baron Corvo's conversion and vocation (with Brocard Sewell)Aylesford: St. Albert's Press, 1964).
- Woolf, Cecil (1965)."Hawker of Morwenstow, 1803-1875." The Book Collector 14 no 1 (spring): 62–71; 14 no 2 (summer): 202–211.
- Woolf, Cecil. 2017. The Other Boy at the Hogarth Press: Virginia and Leonard Woolf as I Remember Them. London: Cecil Woolf Publishers.
