= Memoirs of an Infantry Officer =

Sequel to Memoirs of a Fox Hunting Man

- Author: Siegfried Sassoon
- Language: English
- Genre: Fictionalised autobiography
- Publisher: Faber and Faber
- Publication date: 1930
- Publication place: United Kingdom
- Preceded by: Memoirs of a Fox-Hunting Man
- Followed by: Sherston's Progress

Memoirs of an Infantry Officer is a novel by Siegfried Sassoon, first published in 1930. It is a fictionalised account of Sassoon's own life during and immediately after World War I. Soon after its release, it was heralded as a classic and was even more successful than its predecessor, Memoirs of a Fox-Hunting Man.

== Synopsis ==
Sassoon's account of his experiences in the trenches during World War I, between the spring of 1916 and the summer of 1917, creates a picture of a physically brave but self-effacing and highly insecure individual. The narrative moves from the trenches to the Fourth Army School, to Morlancourt and a raid, then to and through the Somme. The narrator, George Sherston, is wounded when a piece of shrapnel shell passes through his lung after he incautiously sticks his head over the parapet at the Battle of Arras in 1917. He is sent home to convalesce and, while there, arranges to have lunch with the Editor of an anti-war newspaper, the Unconservative Weekly. He determines to speak out against the war, though this contravenes military regulations and could result in his execution. The book finishes as George Sherston prepares to attend 'Slateford War Hospital' (Craiglockhart War Hospital in Edinburgh) after a medical board had decided he was suffering from shell shock. The book portrays Sherston's emotional and intellectual coming of age, as he learns "that he is but one insignificant person caught up in events beyond anyone's comprehension".

== Background ==
Sassoon was presenting his own experiences in novelistic form. The title is deliberately depersonalised, and Sassoon opted to use pseudonyms in place of names in his "George Sherston" trilogy (George Sherston being Sassoon's alter ego). Other notable characters in the book include Sassoon's contemporary Robert Graves, who appears in the book as 'David Cromlech', and 'Dick Tiltwood' (Sassoon's pseudonym for the Welsh soldier David Cuthbert Thomas). Both men convalesced at Somerville College, Oxford during the war.

== Reviews ==
"Harold Nicolson wrote in the Daily Express that it was a book "of deep beauty and abiding significance. A book which will, I hope and believe, be read by millions."

A Daily Telegraph reviewer said that "Those who in future really want to understand the atmosphere of the years 1916 and 1917, and the conditions of life, will turn back to this book".

== Influence ==
In 1981 Paul Hogarth produced illustrations for the book, which were the subject of an exhibition at the Victoria and Albert Museum during 2014.
