= Siegfried Sassoon =

English war poet and writer (1886–1967)

Siegfried Sassoon CBE MC
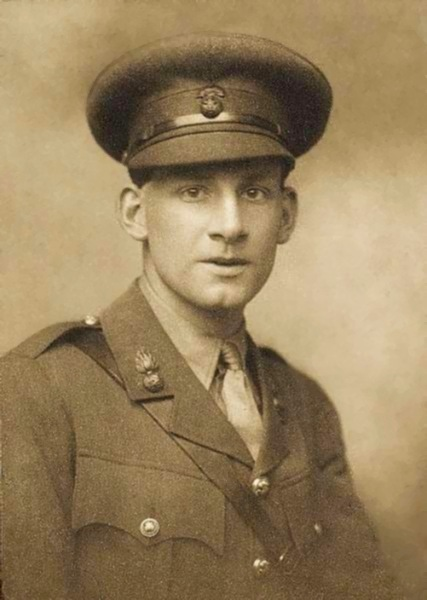
- Portrait by George Charles Beresford, 1915
- Born: Siegfried Loraine Sassoon; 8 September 1886; Matfield, Kent, England
- Died: 1 September 1967 (aged 80); Heytesbury, Wiltshire, England
- Education: Clare College, Cambridge; Marlborough College; New Beacon School
- Occupations: Soldier; war poet; writer
- Spouse: Hester Gatty (m. 1933; sep. 1945)
- Children: George
- Relatives: Sassoon family
- Writing career
- Pen name: Saul Kain; Pinchbeck Lyre
- Genres: Poetry; fiction; biography
- Notable work: The Complete Memoirs of George Sherston
- Military career
- Allegiance: United Kingdom
- Branch: British Army
- Service years: 1914–1919
- Rank: Captain
- Units: Sussex Yeomanry; Royal Welch Fusiliers
- Conflicts: First World War
- Awards: Military Cross

Siegfried Loraine Sassoon (8 September 1886 – 1 September 1967) was an English war poet, writer, and soldier. Decorated for bravery on the Western Front, he became one of the leading poets of the First World War. His poetry both described the horrors of the trenches and satirized the patriotic pretensions of those who, in Sassoon's view, were responsible for a jingoism-fuelled war. Sassoon became a focal point for dissent within the armed forces when he made a lone protest against the continuation of the war with his "Soldier's Declaration" of July 1917, which resulted in his being sent to the Craiglockhart War Hospital. During this period, Sassoon met and formed a friendship with Wilfred Owen, who was greatly influenced by him. Sassoon later won acclaim for his prose work, notably his three-volume, fictionalised autobiography, collectively known as the Sherston trilogy, which is made up of Memoirs of a Fox-Hunting Man (1928), Memoirs of an Infantry Officer (1930) and Sherston's Progress (1936). Sassoon is also known for his poetry collection The Old Huntsman (1917).

== Early life ==
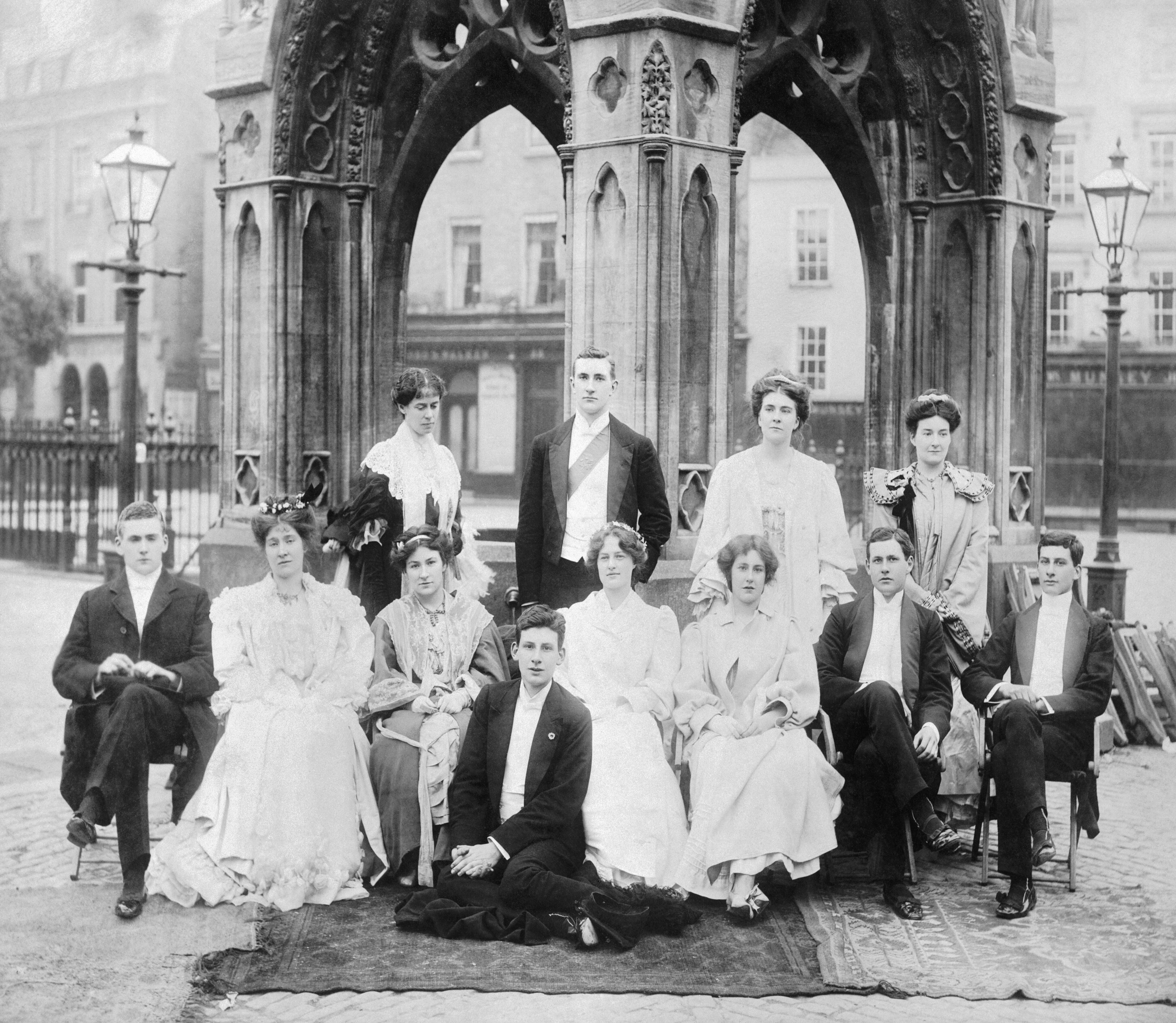
Sassoon (front) with his brother Hamo and other students on the morning after a college May Ball at Cambridge University in 1906

Siegfried Sassoon was born to a Jewish father and an Anglo-Catholic mother, and grew up in the neo-Gothic mansion named Weirleigh (after its builder Harrison Weir) in Matfield, Kent. His father, Alfred Ezra Sassoon (1861–1895), son of Sassoon David Sassoon, was a member of the wealthy Baghdadi Jewish Sassoon merchant family. Siegfried's mother, Theresa, belonged to the Thornycroft family, sculptors responsible for many of the best-known statues in London; among them her brother, Sir Hamo Thornycroft.

There was no German ancestry in Sassoon's family; his mother named him Siegfried because of her love of Wagner's operas. His middle name, Loraine, was the surname of a clergyman she respected.

Siegfried was the second of three sons, the others being Michael and Hamo. When he was four years old his parents separated. During his father's weekly visits to the boys, Theresa locked herself in the drawing-room. In 1895, Alfred Sassoon died of tuberculosis.

Sassoon was educated at the New Beacon School, Sevenoaks, Kent; at Marlborough College, Wiltshire; and at Clare College, Cambridge, where from 1905 to 1907 he read history. He left Cambridge without a degree and spent the years after 1907 hunting, playing cricket and writing verse, some of which he published privately.

Although his father had been disinherited from the Sassoon fortune for marrying a woman who was not Jewish, Siegfried had a small private income that allowed him to live modestly without having to earn a living. Later, he was left a large legacy by an aunt, Rachel Beer, allowing him to buy the great estate of Heytesbury House in Wiltshire.

His first published success, "The Daffodil Murderer" (1913), was a parody of John Masefield's The Everlasting Mercy. Robert Graves, in Good-Bye to All That, describes it as a "parody of Masefield which, midway through, had forgotten to be a parody and turned into rather good Masefield."

=== Cricket ===
Sassoon played for his village cricket team at a young age, and his brothers and three of his tutors were cricket enthusiasts. The Marchant family were neighbouring landowners, and Frank Marchant was captain of the county side between 1890 and 1897. Sassoon played for his house at Marlborough, once taking 7 wickets for 18 runs, and during this time he contributed three poems to Cricket magazine.

For some years around 1910 he often played for Bluemantles Cricket Club, at the Nevill Ground, in Tunbridge Wells, sometimes alongside Arthur Conan Doyle. He later played for a Downside Abbey team called "The Ravens", continuing playing well into his seventies.

== War service ==
=== The Western Front: Military Cross ===
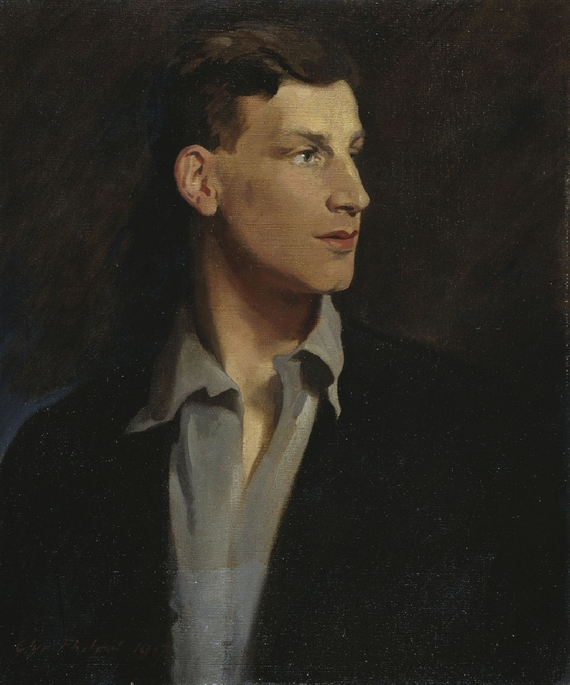
Portrait of Sassoon by Glyn Warren Philpot, 1917 (Fitzwilliam Museum)

Sassoon joined the Army just as the threat of a new European war was recognized, and was in service with the Sussex Yeomanry on 4 August 1914, the day the United Kingdom declared war on Germany. He broke his arm badly in a riding accident and was put out of action before leaving England, spending the spring of 1915 convalescing. He was commissioned into the 3rd Battalion (Special Reserve), Royal Welch Fusiliers, as a second lieutenant on 29 May 1915.

On 1 November, his younger brother Hamo was killed in the Gallipoli Campaign, dying on board the ship Kildonan Castle after having had his leg amputated. In the same month, Siegfried was sent to the 1st Battalion, Royal Welch Fusiliers, in France, where he met Robert Graves, and they became close friends. United by their poetic vocation, they often read and discussed each other's work. Though this did not have much perceptible influence on Graves' poetry, Graves' views on what may be called "gritty realism" profoundly affected Sassoon's concept of what constituted poetry.

He soon became horrified by the realities of war, and the tone of his writing changed completely: where his early poems exhibit a Romantic sweetness, his war poetry moves to an increasingly discordant music, intended to convey the ugly truths of the trenches to an audience hitherto lulled by patriotic propaganda. Details such as rotting corpses, mangled limbs, filth, cowardice and suicide are all trademarks of his work at this time, and this philosophy of "no truth unfitting" had a significant effect on the movement towards Modernist poetry.

Sassoon's periods of duty on the Western Front were marked by exceptionally brave actions, including the single-handed capture of a German trench. Armed with grenades, he scattered sixty German soldiers:

He went over with bombs in daylight, under covering fire from a couple of rifles, and scared away the occupants. A pointless feat, since instead of signalling for reinforcements, he sat down in the German trench and began reading a book of poems which he had brought with him. When he went back he did not even report. Colonel Stockwell, then in command, raged at him. The attack on Mametz Wood had been delayed for two hours because British patrols were still reported to be out. "British patrols" were Siegfried and his book of poems. "I'd have got you a DSO, if you'd only shown more sense," stormed Stockwell.

Sassoon's bravery was so inspiring that soldiers of his company said that they felt confident only when they were accompanied by him. He often went out on night raids and bombing patrols, and demonstrated ruthless efficiency as a company commander.

Deepening depression at the horror and misery the soldiers were forced to endure produced in Sassoon a paradoxically manic courage, and he was nicknamed "Mad Jack" by his men for his near-suicidal exploits. On 27 July 1916 he was awarded the Military Cross; the citation read:

2nd Lt. Siegfried Lorraine [sic] Sassoon, 3rd (attd. 1st) Bn., R. W. Fus. For conspicuous gallantry during a raid on the enemy's trenches. He remained for 1½ hours under rifle and bomb fire collecting and bringing in our wounded. Owing to his courage and determination all the killed and wounded were brought in.

Robert Graves described Sassoon as engaging in suicidal feats of bravery. Sassoon was also later recommended for the Victoria Cross.

=== War opposition and Craiglockhart ===
Despite his decorations and reputation, in 1917 Sassoon decided to make a stand against the conduct of the war. One of the reasons for his violent anti-war feeling was the death of his friend David Cuthbert Thomas, who appears as "Dick Tiltwood" in the Sherston trilogy. Sassoon spent years trying to overcome his grief.

In August 1916, Sassoon arrived at Somerville College, Oxford, which was used as a hospital for convalescing officers, with a case of gastric fever. He wrote: "To be lying in a little white-walled room, looking through the window on to a College lawn, was for the first few days very much like a paradise". Graves ended up at Somerville as well. "How unlike you to crib my idea of going to the Ladies' College at Oxford", Sassoon wrote to him in 1917.

At the end of a spell of convalescent leave, Sassoon declined to return to duty; encouraged by pacifist friends such as Bertrand Russell and Lady Ottoline Morrell, he sent a letter to his commanding officer titled Finished with the War: A Soldier's Declaration. Forwarded to the press and read aloud in the House of Commons by a sympathetic member of Parliament, the letter was seen by some as treasonous ("I am making this statement as an act of willful defiance of military authority") or at best as condemning the war government's motives ("I believe that the war upon which I entered as a war of defence and liberation has now become a war of aggression and conquest").

Rather than court-martial Sassoon, the Under-Secretary of State for War, Ian Macpherson, decided that he was unfit for service and had him sent to Craiglockhart War Hospital near Edinburgh, where he officially was treated for neurasthenia ("shell shock").

At the end of 1917, Sassoon was posted to Limerick, Ireland, where in the New Barracks he helped train new recruits. He wrote that it was a period of respite for him, and allowed him to indulge in his love of hunting. Reflecting on the period years later, he mentioned how trouble was brewing in Ireland at the time, in the few years before the Irish War of Independence. After only a short period in Limerick he was posted to Egypt.

Before declining to return to active service, Sassoon had thrown his MC ribbon into the sea at Formby beach; some people misinterpreted his description of this incident in Memoirs of an Infantry Officer and believed that he had thrown the medal itself away, but this was retained and passed into the care of his family. He stated that he did not do this as a symbolic rejection of militaristic values, but simply out of the need to perform some destructive act as catharsis. His account states that one of his pre-war sporting trophies, had he had one to hand, would have served his purpose equally well. The actual decoration was rediscovered after the death of Sassoon's only son, George, and subsequently became the subject of a dispute among Sassoon's heirs.

At Craiglockhart, Sassoon met Wilfred Owen, another poet. It was thanks to Sassoon that Owen persevered in his ambition to write better poetry. A manuscript copy of Owen's Anthem for Doomed Youth containing Sassoon's handwritten amendments survives as testimony to the extent of his influence and is currently on display at London's Imperial War Museum.

Sassoon became to Owen "Keats and Christ and Elijah", according to a surviving letter which demonstrates the depth of Owen's love and admiration for him. Both men returned to active service in France, but Owen was killed in 1918, a week before Armistice. Sassoon was promoted to lieutenant, and, having spent some time in Palestine, eventually returned to France by 20 June 1918.

Sassoon was wounded again on 13 July 1918—reportedly by friendly fire when he was injured by a shot to the head by a fellow British soldier who had apparently mistaken him for a German, near Arras, France. As a result of this injury, he spent the remainder of the war in Britain. By this time, he had been promoted to acting captain. He relinquished his commission on health grounds on 12 March 1919, but retained the rank of captain.

After the war, Sassoon was instrumental in bringing Owen's work to the attention of a wider audience. Their relationship is the subject of Stephen MacDonald's play Not About Heroes.

== Post-war life (editor and novelist) ==
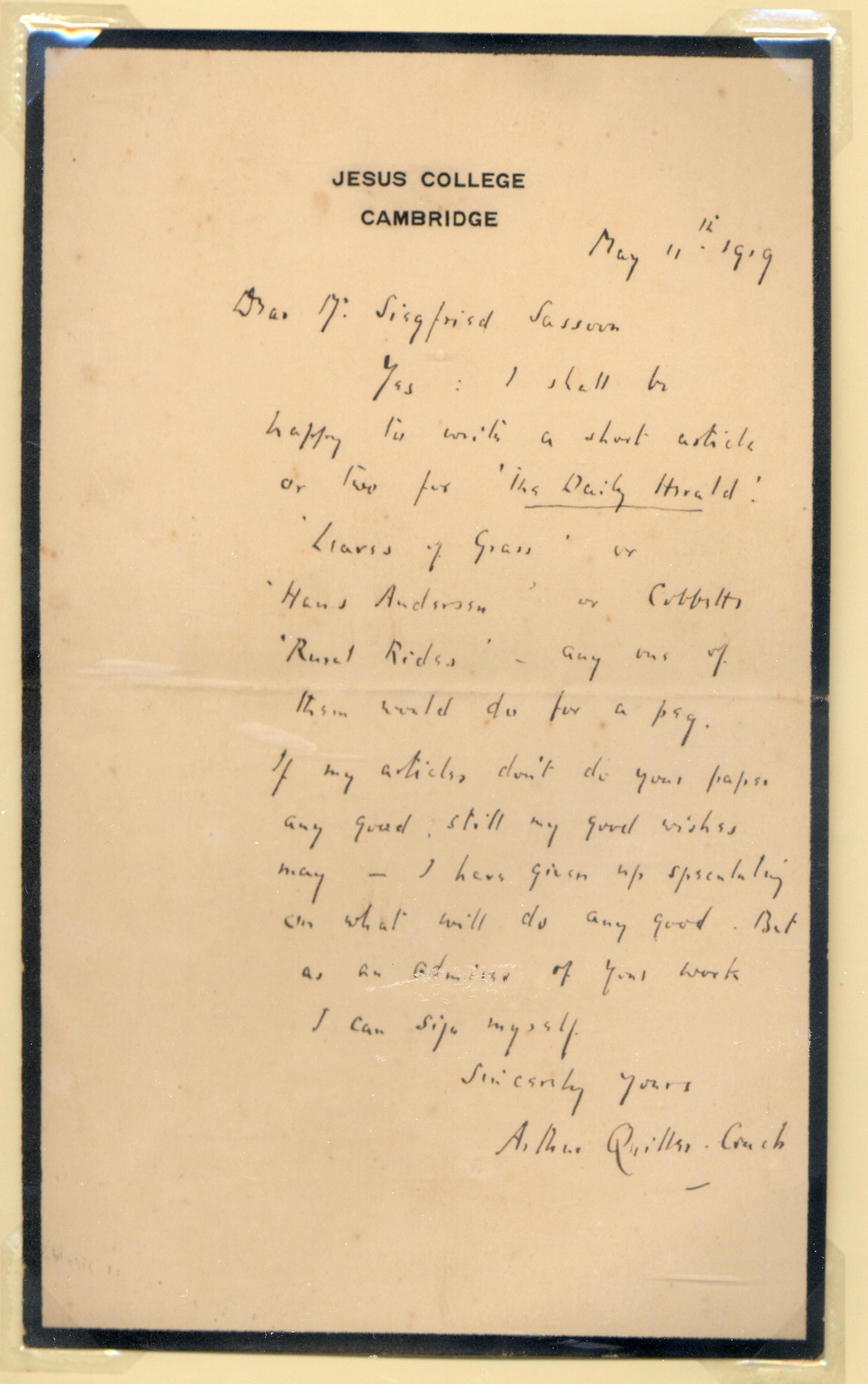
An agreement from Arthur Quiller-Couch to Sassoon to write for the Daily Herald

Having lived for a period at Oxford, where he spent more time visiting literary friends than studying, Sassoon dabbled briefly in the politics of the Labour movement. In November 1918, he travelled to Blackburn to support the Labour candidate in the general election, Philip Snowden, who had been a pacifist during the war.

Though a self-confessed political novice, Sassoon delivered campaign speeches for Snowden, later writing that he 'felt grateful for [Snowden's] anti-war attitude in parliament, and had been angered by the abuse thrown at him. All my political sympathies were with him.'

While his commitment to politics waned after this, he remained a supporter of the Labour Party, and in 1929 'rejoiced that [they] had gained seats in the British general election.' Similarly, 'news of the massive Labour victory in 1945 pleased him, because many Tories from the class he had loathed during the First World War had gone.'

In 1919 Sassoon took up a post as literary editor of the socialist Daily Herald. He lived at 54 Tufton Street, Westminster, from 1919 to 1925; the house is no longer standing, but the location of his former home is marked by a memorial plaque.

During his period at the Herald, Sassoon was responsible for employing several eminent names as reviewers, including E. M. Forster and Charlotte Mew, and commissioned original material from writers like Arnold Bennett and Osbert Sitwell. His artistic interests extended to music.

While at Oxford he was introduced to the young William Walton, to whom he became a friend and patron. Walton later dedicated his Portsmouth Point overture to Sassoon in recognition of his financial assistance and moral support.

Sassoon later embarked on a lecture tour of the US, as well as travelling in Europe and throughout Britain. He acquired a car, a gift from the publisher Frankie Schuster, and became renowned among his friends for his lack of driving skill, but this did not prevent him making full use of the mobility it gave him.

Sassoon had expressed his growing sense of identification with German soldiers in poems such as "Reconciliation" (1918), and after the war, he travelled extensively in Germany, visiting the country a number of times over the next decade.

In 1921 Sassoon went to Rome, where he met the Kaiser's nephew, Prince Philipp of Hesse. The two became lovers for a while, later taking a holiday together in Munich. They had become estranged by the mid-1920s, due in part to geographical distance and in part, as Jean Moorcroft Wilson notes, to Sassoon's increasing discomfort over Philipp's growing interest in right-wing politics.

Sassoon continued to visit Germany. In 1927 he travelled to Berlin and Dresden with Osbert and Sacheverell Sitwell, and in 1929 he accompanied Stephen Tennant on a trip to a sanatorium in the Bavarian countryside.

Sassoon was a great admirer of the Welsh poet Henry Vaughan. On a visit to Wales in 1924, he made a pilgrimage to Vaughan's grave at Llansantffraed, Powys, and there wrote "At the Grave of Henry Vaughan", one of his better-known peacetime poems. The deaths within a short space of time of three of his closest friends – Edmund Gosse, Thomas Hardy and Frankie Schuster – came as setbacks to his personal happiness.

At the same time, Sassoon was preparing to take a new direction. While in the U.S., he had experimented with a novel. In 1928, he branched into prose, with Memoirs of a Fox-Hunting Man, the anonymously published first volume of a fictionalized autobiography, which was almost immediately accepted as a classic, bringing its author new fame as a prose writer.

The memoir, whose mild-mannered central character is content to do little more than be an idle country gentleman, playing cricket, riding and hunting foxes, is often humorous, revealing a side of Sassoon that had rarely been seen in his work during the war years.

The book won the 1928 James Tait Black Award for fiction. Sassoon followed it with Memoirs of an Infantry Officer (1930) and Sherston's Progress (1936). In later years, he revisited his youth and early manhood with three volumes of genuine autobiography, which were acclaimed. These were The Old Century, The Weald of Youth and Siegfried's Journey.

== Personal life ==
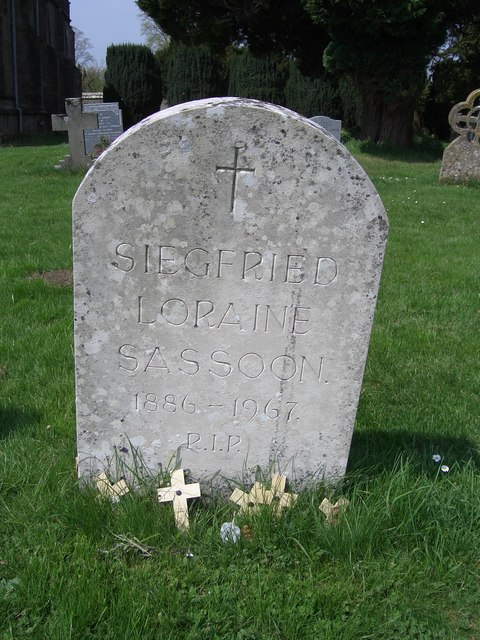
Siegfried Sassoon's gravestone at St Andrew's Church, Mells, Somerset

=== Homosexuality and affairs ===
At Craiglockhart, Sassoon had met Wilfred Owen, another war poet. Numerous surviving documents demonstrate clearly the depth of Owen's love and admiration for him. Writing years after Owen died, Sassoon said that "W's death was an unhealed wound, & the ache of it has been with me ever since. I wanted him back – not his poems." Both men returned to active service in France, where Owen was killed in 1918.

Following the war he is believed to have had a succession of love affairs with men, including:

- William Park "Gabriel" Atkin, a landscape, architectural, and figure painter, draftsman, and illustrator
- Ivor Novello, actor
- Glen Byam Shaw, actor and Novello's former lover
- Prince Philipp of Hesse, German aristocrat
- Beverley Nichols, writer
- Stephen Tennant, an aristocrat

Although Byam Shaw remained Sassoon's close friend throughout his life, only Tennant made a permanent impression.

Introduced by the Sitwells in 1927, Sassoon and Stephen Tennant began a relationship which lasted nearly six years. Tennant, however, had recurrent tuberculosis, and the strain which that put on their relationship had started to show by the early 1930s. In May 1933, Tennant, then receiving treatment at a sanatorium in Kent, abruptly informed Sassoon via a letter written by his physician that he never wanted to see him again. Sassoon was devastated.

When he met his future wife Hester Gatty a few months later, he was still reeling from his break-up with Tennant. Sensing a sympathetic nature, Sassoon confided in Hester about their relationship and, at her suggestion, wrote Tennant a letter to put the past to rest. While he and Tennant exchanged letters, telephone calls and infrequent visits in the years to come, they never resumed their previous relationship.

=== Marriage and later life ===
In September 1931, Sassoon rented Fitz House, Teffont Magna, Wiltshire, and began to live there. In December 1933, he married Hester Gatty (daughter of Sir Stephen Gatty), who was 20 years his junior, and soon afterwards they moved to Heytesbury House.

The marriage led to the birth of a child, something Sassoon had purportedly craved for a long time. Siegfried's son, George Sassoon (1936–2006), became a scientist, linguist, and author, and was adored by Siegfried, who wrote several poems addressed to him. Siegfried's marriage broke down after the Second World War, with Sassoon apparently unable to find a compromise between the solitude he enjoyed and the companionship he needed.

Separated from his wife in 1945, Sassoon lived in relative seclusion at Heytesbury in Wiltshire, but he maintained contact with a circle which included E. M. Forster and J. R. Ackerley as well as formed one-sided romantic attachments with a number of younger men such as cartoonist Haro Hodson. One of his other romantic friendships was the cricketer Dennis Silk who later became Warden (headmaster) of Radley College. He also formed a close platonic friendship with Vivien Hancock, then headmistress of Greenways School at Ashton Gifford House, Wiltshire, where his son George was a pupil. The relationship provoked Hester to make strong accusations of Hancock engaging in dubious behavior including alcoholism. Hancock responded with the threat of legal action.

=== Religion ===
After a lifetime of grappling with questions of faith and spirituality, Sassoon made the decision to convert to Catholicism in 1957. His motivation for this conversion has been the subject of much speculation and analysis. Intellectual exploration, aesthetic appeal, spiritual seeking, and the influence of figures like Ronald Knox were factors for Sassoon's decision to convert.

== Death and awards ==
Sassoon was appointed Commander of the Order of the British Empire (CBE) in the 1951 New Year Honours. He died from stomach cancer on 1 September 1967, one week before his 81st birthday.

He is buried at St Andrew's Church, Mells, Somerset, not far from the grave of Father Ronald Knox, whom he so admired. His CBE, MC and campaign medals are on display at the Royal Welch Fusiliers Museum at Caernarfon Castle.

== Legacy ==
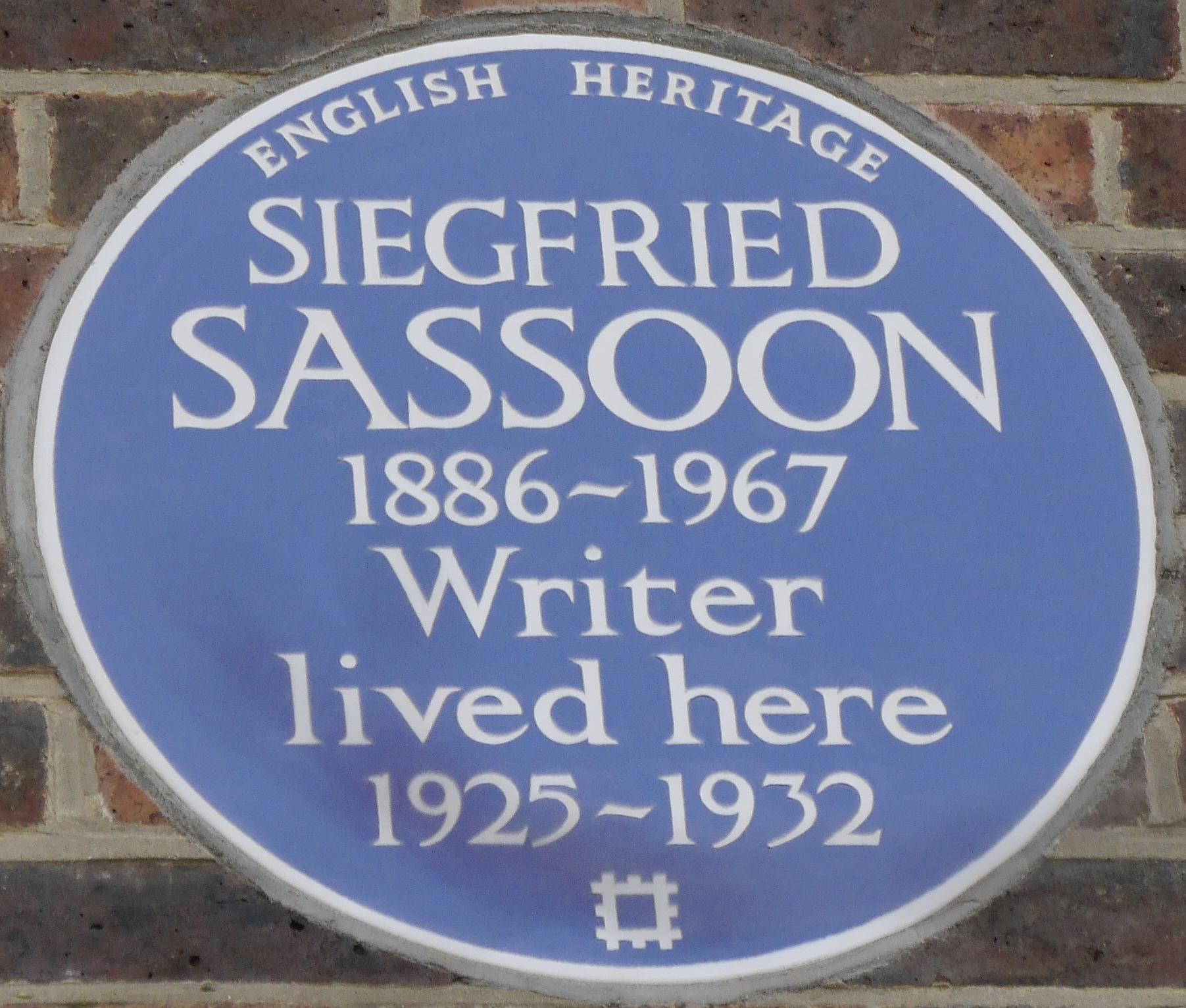
Blue plaque, 23 Campden Hill Square, London

On 11 November 1985, Sassoon was among 16 Great War poets commemorated on a slate stone unveiled in Westminster Abbey's Poet's Corner. The inscription on the stone was taken from Wilfred Owen's "Preface" to his poems and reads: "My subject is War, and the pity of War. The Poetry is in the pity."

The year 2003 saw the publication of Memorial Tablet, an authorised audio CD of readings by Sassoon recorded during the late 1950s. These included extracts from Memoirs of an Infantry Officer and The Weald of Youth as well as several war poems, including "Attack", "The Dug-Out", "At Carnoy" and "Died of Wounds", and postwar works. The CD also included comment on Sassoon by three of his Great War contemporaries: Edmund Blunden, Edgell Rickword and Henry Williamson.

Siegfried Sassoon's only child, George Sassoon, died of cancer in 2006. George had three children, two of whom were killed in a car crash in 1996. His daughter by his first marriage, Kendall Sassoon, is patron-in-chief of the Siegfried Sassoon Fellowship, established in 2001.

Sassoon's Military Cross was rediscovered by his family in May 2007 and was put up for sale. It was bought by the Royal Welch Fusiliers for display at their museum in Caernarfon. Sassoon's other service medals went unclaimed until 1985 when his son George obtained them from the Army Medal Office, then based at Droitwich. The "late claim" medals consisting of the 1914–15 Star, Victory Medal and British War Medal along with Sassoon's CBE and Warrant of Appointment were auctioned by Sotheby's in 2008.

In June 2009, the University of Cambridge announced plans to purchase an archive of Sassoon's papers from his family, to be added to the university library's Sassoon collection. On 4 November 2009, it was reported that this purchase would be supported by £550,000 from the National Heritage Memorial Fund, meaning that the University still needed to raise a further £110,000 on top of the money already received to meet the full £1.25 million asking price.

The funds were raised and in December 2009 it was announced that the University had received the papers. Included in the collection are war diaries kept by Sassoon while he served on the Western Front and in Palestine, a draft of "A Soldier's Declaration" (1917), notebooks from his schooldays and post-war journals.

Other items in the collection include love letters to his wife Hester and photographs and letters from other writers. Sassoon was an undergraduate at the university, as well as being made an honorary fellow of Clare College; the collection is housed at the Cambridge University Library. As well as private individuals, funding came from the Monument Trust, the JP Getty Jr Trust and Sir Siegmund Warburg's Voluntary Settlement.

In 2010, Dream Voices: Siegfried Sassoon, Memory and War, a major exhibition of Sassoon's life and archive, was held at Cambridge University. Several of Sassoon's poems have been set to music, some during his life, by Cyril Rootham, who co-operated with the author.

The discovery in 2013 of an early draft of one of Sassoon's best-known anti-war poems had a biographer saying she would rewrite portions of her work about the poet. In the poem "Atrocities", which concerned the killing of German prisoners of war by Allied troops, the early draft shows that some lines were cut and others diluted. The poet's publisher was nervous about publishing the poem and held it for publication in an expurgated version at a later date. Sassoon biographer Jean Moorcroft Wilson said "This is very exciting material. I want to rewrite my biography and I probably shall be able to get some of it in. It's a treasure trove". In early 2019, it was announced in The Guardian that a student from the University of Warwick, whilst looking through Glen Byam Shaw's records at the Shakespeare Birthplace Trust, had serendipitously discovered a Sassoon poem addressed to the former, which had not been published in its entirety.

== Books ==
=== Poetry collections ===
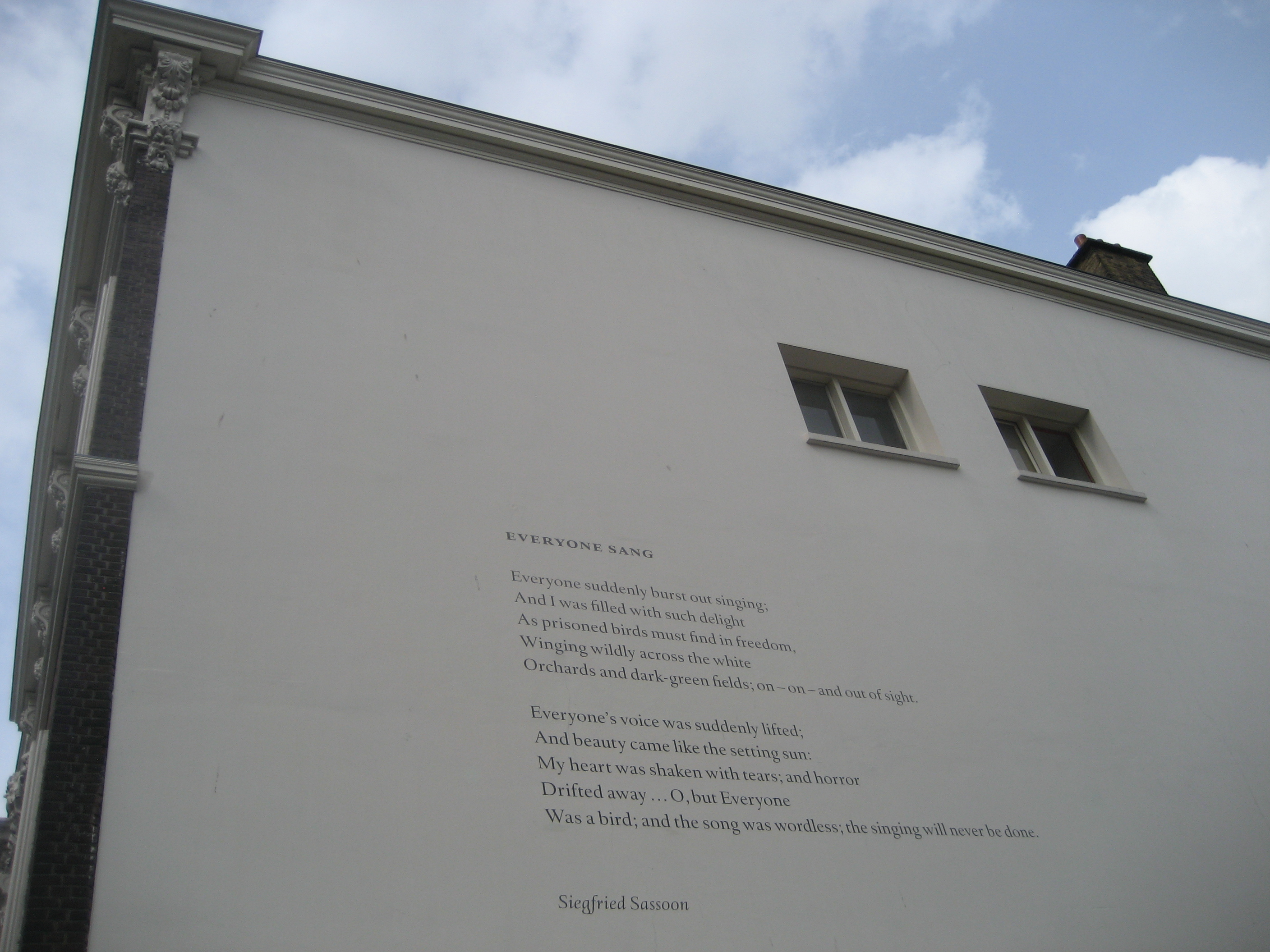
Poem "Everyone Sang" by Sassoon on a wall in The Hague

- The Daffodil Murderer (John Richmond: 1913)
- The Old Huntsman (Heinemann: 1917)
- The General (Denmark Hill Hospital, April 1917)
- Does it Matter? (written: 1917)
- Counter-Attack and Other Poems (Heinemann: 1918)
- The Hero [Henry Holt, 1918]
- Picture-Show (Heinemann: 1919)
- War Poems (Heinemann: 1919)
- Aftermath (Heinemann: 1920)
- Recreations (privately printed: 1923)
- Lingual Exercises for Advanced Vocabularians (privately printed: 1925)
- Selected Poems (Heinemann: 1925)
- Satirical Poems (Heinemann: 1926)
- The Heart's Journey (Heinemann: 1928)
- Poems by Pinchbeck Lyre (Duckworth: 1931)
- The Road to Ruin (Faber and Faber: 1933)
- Vigils (Heinemann: 1935)
- Rhymed Ruminations (Faber and Faber: 1940)
- Poems Newly Selected (Faber and Faber: 1940)
- Collected Poems (Faber and Faber: 1947)
- Common Chords (privately printed: 1950/1951)
- Emblems of Experience (privately printed: 1951)
- The Tasking (privately printed: 1954)
- Sequences (Faber and Faber: 1956)
- Lenten Illuminations (Downside Abbey: 1959)
- The Path to Peace (Stanbrook Abbey Press: 1960)
- Collected Poems 1908–1956 (Faber and Faber: 1961)
- The War Poems ed. Rupert Hart-Davis (Faber and Faber: 1983)

=== Prose books ===
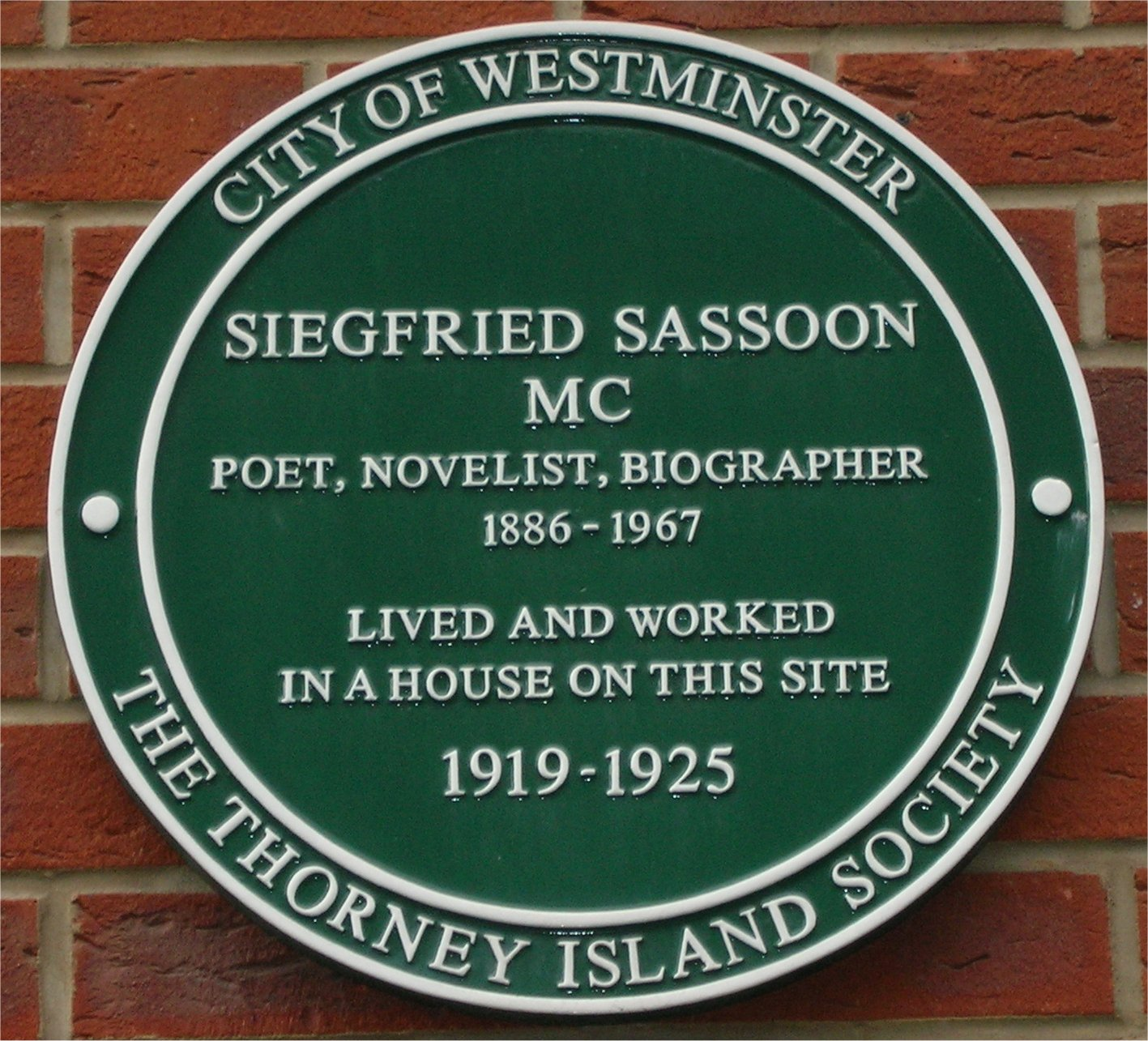
Green plaque on the site of Sassoon's former home in Tufton Street, Westminster, London

- Memoirs of a Fox-Hunting Man (Faber & Gwyer: 1928)
- Memoirs of an Infantry Officer (Faber and Faber: 1930)
- Sherston's Progress (Faber and Faber: 1936)
- The Complete Memoirs of George Sherston (Faber and Faber: 1937)
- The Old Century and seven more years (Faber and Faber: 1938)
- On Poetry (University of Bristol Press: 1939)
- The Weald of Youth (Faber and Faber: 1942)
- Siegfried's Journey, 1916–1920 (Faber and Faber: 1945)
- Meredith (Constable: 1948) – biography of George Meredith
- The Siegfried Sassoon Diaries ed. by Rupert Hart-Davis
  - Diaries 1915-1918 (Faber and Faber: 1983)
  - Diaries 1920-1922 (Faber and Faber: 1981)
  - Diaries 1923-1925 (Faber and Faber: 1985)

== In popular culture ==
A 1970 installment of The Wednesday Play titled Mad Jack, based on Sassoon's wartime experiences and their aftermath leading to his renunciation of his Military Cross, starred Michael Jayston as Sassoon.

The 1991 novel Regeneration by Pat Barker is a fictionalized account of this period in Sassoon's life, and was made into a film starring James Wilby as Sassoon and Jonathan Pryce as W. H. R. Rivers, the psychiatrist responsible for Sassoon's treatment. Rivers became a kind of surrogate father to the troubled young man, and his sudden death in 1922 was a major blow to Sassoon.

In 2004, the English band Electrelane set some of Sassoon’s poem A Letter Home to music as ”The Valleys” on their album The Power Out.

In 2014, John Hurt played the older Sassoon and Morgan Watkins the young Sassoon in The Pity of War, a BBC dramatized documentary.

A film titled The Burying Party (released August 2018) depicts Wilfred Owen's final year from Craiglockhart Hospital to the Battle of the Sambre (1918), including his meeting with Sassoon at the hospital. Matthew Staite stars as Owen and Sid Phoenix as Sassoon.

Peter Capaldi and Jack Lowden portrayed Sassoon in Terence Davies' 2021 film Benediction.

Timothy Renouf portrayed Sassoon in The Laureate, a 2021 biographical film about Robert Graves.

Stevan Rimkus portrayed Sassoon in The Young Indiana Jones Chronicles episode Somme, Early August 1916.

Sassoon served as inspiration for Alice Winn's novel In Memoriam, specifically the character Sidney Ellwood.
