= Memoirs of a Fox-Hunting Man =

Semi-Autobiographical Novel

- First illustrated edition (1929, Faber and Faber)
- Author: Siegfried Sassoon
- Illustrator: William Nicholson (1929 edition)
- Language: English
- Genre: Autobiographical novel
- Publisher: Faber and Faber
- Publication date: 1928
- Publication place: United Kingdom
- Media type: Print (hardcover)
- Pages: 395
- OCLC: 213831105
- LC Class: PR6037.A86 M35
- Followed by: Memoirs of an Infantry Officer

Memoirs of a Fox-Hunting Man is a novel by Siegfried Sassoon, first published in 1928 by Faber and Faber. Originally published anonymously, it went on to become a bestseller, and won both the Hawthornden Prize and the James Tait Black Memorial Prize.

== Background ==
Prior to its publication, Siegfried Sassoon's reputation rested entirely on his poetry, mostly written during and about World War I. Only ten years after the war ended, after some experience of journalism, did he feel ready to branch out into prose. So uncertain was he of the wisdom of this move that he elected to publish Memoirs of a Fox-Hunting Man anonymously. It is a depiction of his early years presented in the form of an autobiographical novel, with false names being given to the central characters, including Sassoon himself, who appears as "George Sherston". Sassoon was motivated to write the work by a war incident, when a fox was loose in the trenches and one of his friends shot and killed it. However, the book draws heavily on his pre-war life, with riding and hunting being among the favourite pastimes of the author.

Much of the material for the novel came from Sassoon's own diaries. He said he was inspired by the work of Marcel Proust, saying, "A few pages of Proust have made me wonder whether insignificant episodes aren't the most significant". In particular, his relationship with "Aunt Evelyn", a fictionalised representation of his mother Theresa, is revealed as having been a major influence in his upbringing.

== Plot ==
The story is a series of episodes in the youth of George Sherston, ranging from his first attempts to learn to ride to his experiences in winning point-to-point races. The title is somewhat misleading, as the book is mainly concerned with a series of landmark events in Sherston/Sassoon's childhood and youth, and his encounters with various comic characters. "The Flower-Show Match", an account of an annual village cricket match – an important fixture for those involved – in which young Sherston plays a significant part, was later published separately by Faber as a self-contained story. The book as a whole is a frequently humorous work, in which fox-hunting, one of Sassoon's major interests, comes to represent the young man's innocent frame of mind in the years before war broke out. The book ends with his enlistment in a local regiment, the Sussex Yeomanry, and his subsequent transfer, with a commission, to the Flintshire Fusiliers, a battalion of the Royal Welsh which was sent to France. The story is continued in two sequels: Memoirs of an Infantry Officer and Sherston's Progress.
