= Aylesford Press =

The Aylesford Press was a book publishing company based in Upton, Cheshire, England.
