= Sherston's Progress =

1936 semi-autobiographical novel by Siegfried Sassoon

- Author: Siegfried Sassoon
- Language: English
- Genre: Fictionalised autobiography
- Publisher: Faber and Faber
- Publication date: 1936
- Publication place: United Kingdom
- Preceded by: Memoirs of an Infantry Officer

Sherston's Progress, published in 1936, is the final book of Siegfried Sassoon's semi-autobiographical trilogy. It is preceded by Memoirs of a Fox-Hunting Man and Memoirs of an Infantry Officer.

== Synopsis ==
The book starts with Sherston's arrival at 'Slateford War Hospital' in Edinburgh (based on Craiglockhart War Hospital) for shell-shocked soldiers. He has not been wounded, but has refused to continue fighting, causing himself a little temporary notoriety in England. The famous neurologist W. H. R. Rivers is a major character in the book (and had a profound influence on Sassoon in real life). After many sessions in which he gets to know himself and his motives better, he decides his only option is to ask to return to the front line.

Sherston is sent to an army base in Ireland (where he is introduced to 'The Mister', an alcoholic fox-hunting enthusiast), then to Palestine, and finally to the Western Front in France. There, as captain of a company, he describes his fellow officers and his men, his state of mind and his admiration for his servant (Bond).

Early in his posting at the front, he decides to go out with Corporal Davies to attack a German machine-gun post with Mills bombs. On their way back, he is shot in the head by (Sergeant Wickham) of his own company, an experienced soldier who is unaware that the two were still in no-man's-land, and mistakes him for a German. The wound is not serious and he is initially reluctant to be sent to recover in London, where Rivers visits him in hospital:

Without a word he sat down by the bed; and his smile was benediction enough for all I'd been through. "Oh, Rivers, I've had such a funny time since I saw you last!" I exclaimed. And I understood that this was what I'd been waiting for.
