= Joseph Cribb =

British artist (1892–1967)

(Herbert) Joseph Cribb (1892–1967) was a British sculptor, carver and letter-cutter.

Born in Hammersmith, London, Cribb's career as an artist began when he was fourteen. He was recruited by Eric Gill as his assistant in 1906 and was taught letter cutting and masonry skills by his master. He was suggested to Gill by his father Herbert William Cribb's associate, the Arts and Crafts printer Emery Walker. His father was a graphic artist, specialising in cartography.

In 1907 he moved with Gill to Ditchling in Sussex. In 1908 Joseph entered a formal apprenticeship with Gill and extended his skills into carving, assisting Gill with many of his early sculptures in Ditchling, then Ditchling Common. Joseph followed Gill into the Roman Catholic church and later also followed him into the Dominican Third Order. He completed his apprenticeship in 1913, but continued working with Gill, particularly on the Westminster Cathedral Stations of the Cross until his army service in France, 1916–19. During the later part of his service he joined the Directorate of Graves Registration and Enquiries (forerunner of the Imperial War Graves Commission, later Commonwealth War Graves) and participated with Eric Gill's brother Macdonald (Max) in the design of the standard war grave tombstone, making over 50 originals for the many regimental badges represented.

After Cribb returned from France he continued working with Eric Gill, leading the work of various assistants and drawing his brother Lawrence into Gill's team, which was busy making war memorials. In 1920 Cribb joined Gill, Hilary Pepler and Desmond Chute in setting up the Guild of St Joseph and St Dominic, an association of Catholic artists and craftworkers on Ditchling Common. From 1920 Cribb also started taking on his own commissions, also initially making war memorials. His first large sculptural commission was a crucifix for the war memorial at Downside Abbey. When Gill left the Guild and moved first to Wales and later to Buckinghamshire, Joseph's brother went with him and took over Joseph's role as Gill's lead assistant. Joseph remained at the Guild and took over Gill's workshop, establishing his own practice as a sculptor, carver and letter cutter. He continued to do occasional work for Gill, helping him with some of his major sculpture, for example on the monumental sculpture Mankind that is now in the Tate, and cutting letters to Gill's designs.

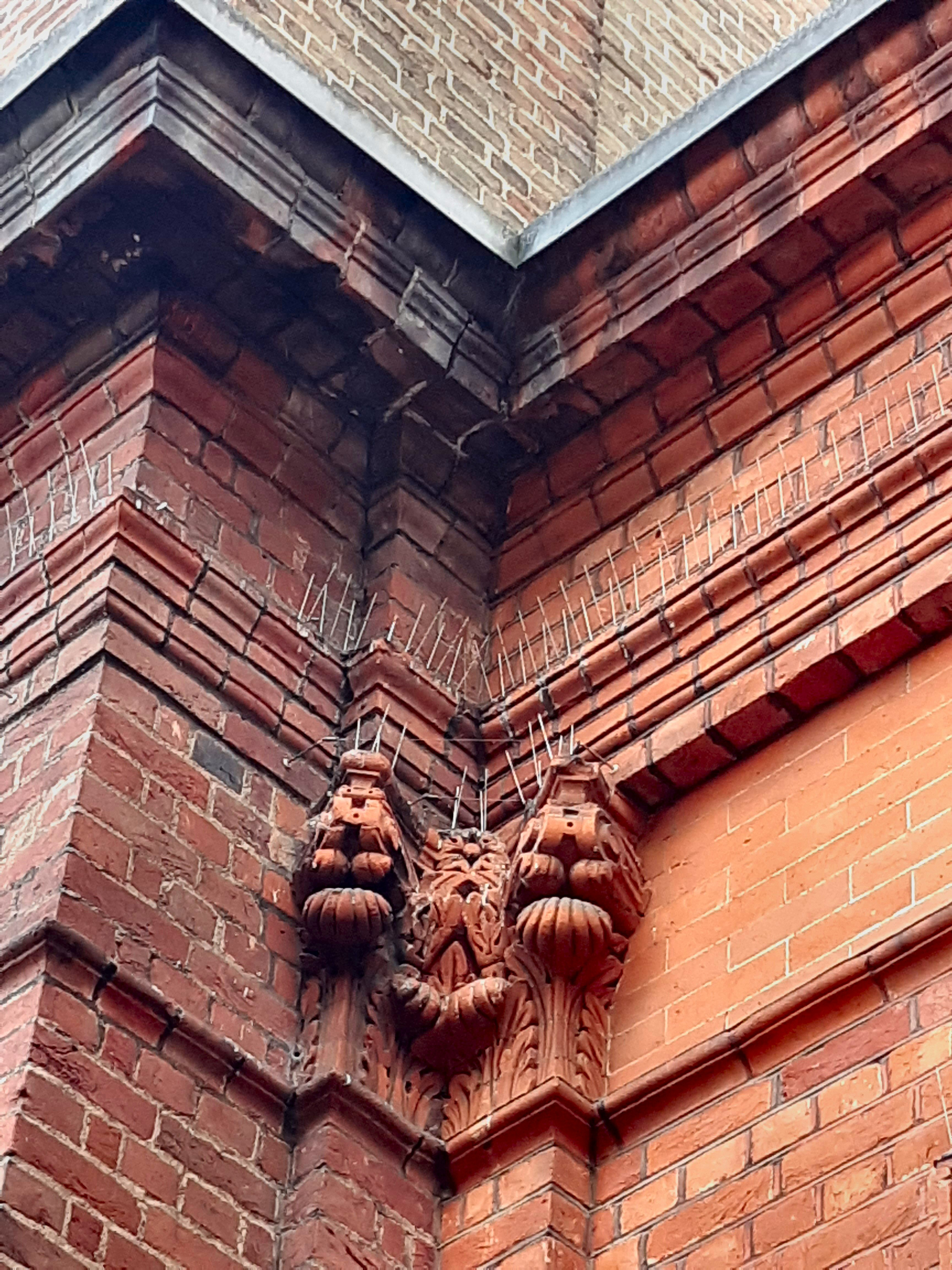
Decorative brickwork on Our Lady of Grace and St Edward Church, Chiswick, with capital carvings by Cribb

From his return from France in 1919 until his death in 1967, Cribb continued to work in the Guild on Ditchling Common, cutting inscriptions, carving sculptures and decorative stone work. His rate of production was prodigious—he was able to cut inscriptions at three or four times the speed of most letter cutters. Examples of his letter cutting can be found in many Sussex cemeteries and in churches and public buildings throughout south-east England. During his career, for example, he made more than twenty sets of Stations of the Cross (each set containing fourteen panels), including that at St Matthew's, Westminster. A St Matthew carved by Cribb can be seen on the west front entrance to St Matthew's church in West Norwood. His work is often mistaken for that of his master, as his letter cutting is difficult to distinguish, but his sculptures are easier to recognise, as he developed his own style, based on the Romanesque sculptures he saw in France and in the Victoria and Albert Museum in London.

At the time of his death he was running a successful business, employing two assistants, Noel Tabbenor and Kenneth Eager. He inspired and trained other renowned sculptors and letter cutters including John Skelton, Michael Harvey and the Irish sculptor Michael Biggs.

Examples of his letter cutting and carving can be seen in Ditchling Museum and next door in St Margaret's Church and its churchyard, where his own grave is to be found, marked with a stone made in his workshop by his assistant Kenneth Eager.

== Bibliography ==
- Attwater, Donald. A Cell of Good Living. London: G. Chapman, 1969. ISBN 0-225-48865-5
- Collins, Judith. Eric Gill: The Sculpture. Woodstock, NY: Overlook Press, 1998. ISBN 0-87951-830-8
- Cribb, Ruth and Cribb, Joe. Eric Gill and Ditchling: The Workshop Tradition, Ditchling: Ditchling Museum. 2007. ISBN 0-9516224-9-8
