= Grisewood =

Grisewood is a surname. Notable people with the surname include:

- Daniel Grisewood (1934–2003), packager and publisher
- Freddie Grisewood (1888–1972), British broadcaster
- Harman Grisewood (1906–1997), English actor
