= Conrad Pepler =

English Catholic (1908–1993)

Conrad Pepler OP (born Stephen Pepler; 5 May 1908 – 10 November 1993) was an English Dominican priest, writer, editor, and publisher. He was the founding Warden of the first Catholic conference centre in the United Kingdom, at Spode House, Staffordshire.

== Life ==
He was born Stephen Pepler in Hammersmith, west London, where his father Hilary Pepler was running a working-men's club. In 1916 the family moved to Ditchling in Sussex, where Hilary, Eric Gill and Desmond Chute set up the Guild of St Joseph and St Dominic, a community of Catholic artist-craftsmen. Hilary was the community's printer. Stephen was received into the Catholic Church in 1916, and sent to the Dominican boarding school at Hawkesyard Priory, Staffordshire.

On leaving school he worked for his father in the printing shop until, in 1927, he entered the Dominican order, taking the name of Conrad. On 10 May 1948, he spoke in Oxford, England, to the Socratic Club on "The Necessity of Christian Mysticism" with T. M. Parker also addressing the topic. He and others attended Ludwig Wittgenstein on his deathbed in Cambridge in 1951.

He is buried in the Ascension Parish Burial Ground in Cambridge.

== Writings ==
- The English religious heritage. St Louis, MO: B. Herder, 1958.
- Sacramental prayer. St Louis, MO: B. Herder, 1959.
- The three degrees: A study of Christian mysticism. London: Blackfriars Publications, 1957.
- Riches despised: A study of the roots of religion. St Louis, MO: B. Herder, 1957.
- Lent, a liturgical commentary on the lessons and gospels. St Louis, MO: B. Herder, 1944.
