= Michael Biggs =

Michael Biggs may refer to:

- Michael Biggs (sculptor), Irish
- Michael Biggs (singer), Brazilian
- Mike Biggs, protagonist of the TV series Mike & Molly
