= Philip Hagreen =

Philip Hagreen (12 July 1890 – 5 February 1988) was a wood engraver who was active at the beginning of the twentieth century. He was a founder member of the Society of Wood Engravers. He was closely associated with Eric Gill and was a member of the Guild of St Joseph and St Dominic at Ditchling.

== Biography ==
Henry Philip Alban Hagreen was the only child of Henry Hagreen, the drawing master at Wellington College, Berkshire. He studied at the college, but his education was disrupted by ill-health. He studied art in Cornwall, under Norman Garstin and then Harold and Laura Knight, and then entered the New Cross Art School. He enlisted in the army at the beginning of the First World War. He was a reluctant soldier, but felt that it was his duty. In 1918 he married Aileen Clegg; they had three children, John, Mary Bernadette and Mary Joan.

In 1923 the family joined Eric Gill at Ditchling, and moved with him to Capel-y-ffin in 1924. The climate proved too harsh for Hagreen and he moved to Lourdes with his family, where he stayed until 1932. He returned to Ditchling until 1959, when the Hagreens moved to Lingfield in Surrey. In 1973 they moved to a nursing home at Ifield Green, which is where he died in 1988 aged 97.

== Wood engravings and book illustrations ==
Hagreen was a founder member of the Society of Wood Engravers in 1920, and exhibited with them from 1920 to 1922. It was Hagreen who suggested that a society be formed, and the first meeting was held in his studio. He was at his most active in the early 1920s and virtually all his wood engravings proper, as opposed to woodcuts, date from this period. In 1921 he showed five works at the first annual exhibition of the Society of Graphic Art.

He contributed seven wood engravings, the most by any engraver, to Change I and Change II (1919), a short-lived review that set out to capture the developments of the moment.

In 1922 he contributed a wood engraving to Contemporary English Woodcuts, an anthology of wood engravings produced by Thomas Balston, a director at Duckworth and an enthusiast for the new style of wood engravings. Campbell Dodgson, Keeper of Prints and Drawings at the British Museum, wrote about him in his introduction to the book: Mr. Hagreen and Mr. Dickey are among the engravers who rely very much upon the effective use of white lines and spaces.

Salaman reproduced The Dawn in his Studio anthology, and wrote Mr. Philip Hagreen's woodcuts interpret light and landscape with an emotional simplicity that gives them poetic distinction.

In 1922 he illustrated Nursery Lyrics & other verses for Children by Lady Jane Strachey. He went on to illustrate The Golden Ass of Lucius Apuleius (1924) and The Devil On Two Sticks (1927) by Rene Le Sage; he also produced a poster for London Underground in 1923.

== Eric Gill, the Guild of St Joseph and St Dominic, and Ditchling ==
Hagreen had become a Roman Catholic in 1915. When he met Eric Gill and moved to Ditchling to join the Guild of St Joseph and St Dominic his life was completely changed. He later moved to Capel-y-ffin with Gill, and virtually gave up his own work. He said that he had everything to unlearn. He learnt the art of lettering from Gill and helped him carve the Stations of the Cross for Saint Cuthbert's Church, Bradford. He shared a workshop with David Jones and played a full part in the communal life of the guild, where a great deal of time was spent in the chapel.

When the family moved to France Hagreen began to produce ivory and wood carvings. He also began to produce woodcuts, using pearwood blocks and knives and special tools that he invented himself; most of his print production was of bookplates and cuts for practical purposes.

In 1932 he was offered a workshop and cottage at Ditchling and returned there for the rest of his working life. This period saw the blossoming of his gifts as a woodcutter; most of his 170 bookplates were produced here. He engraved inscriptions on ecclesiastical vessels produced by the silversmith Dunstan Pruden. His lettering continued the tradition of simplicity and clarity in lettering established by Johnston and Gill.

He was also a committed distributist.

== An overview of Hagreen's work ==
Hagreen's time at Ditchling, where he lived out his beliefs in his daily life, was the most important part of his life for him. He said, "All that matters to me is that I did my best with each job. It was a way of life as a man and a Christian. Work done rightly is wholesome and I have found it jolly good fun."

One consequence of withdrawing from the artistic life followed by most artists at the time was that he disappeared from view. Edgar Holloway says of him, "Considering his great skills in lettering and engraving and comparing him to well-known contemporaries who received official commissions, Hagreen had been probably the most unappreciated engraver of the century."
