= The Guild of St Joseph and St Dominic =

Roman Catholic intentional community

- Named after: Saint Joseph, Saint Dominic
- Formation: 1921
- Founder: Joseph Cribb, Eric Gill, Edward Johnston, Hilary Pepler
- Founded at: Ditchling Common
- Type: Guild

The Guild of St Joseph and St Dominic was a Roman Catholic community of artists and craftspeople founded in 1920 in Ditchling, East Sussex, England. It was part of the Arts and Crafts movement and its legacy led to the creation of the Ditchling Museum of Art + Craft.

== History ==
The Guild grew from the arrival of Eric Gill to Ditchling, Sussex, in 1907 with his apprentice Joseph Cribb. They were soon followed by Desmond Chute and Hilary Pepler. In 1921, the four founded the Guild: a Roman Catholic community based on the idea of the medieval guild. No women were admitted to the guild until 1972.

The communal buildings and family houses grew around a site north of Ditchling, on the edge of Ditchling Common (now encroached by Burgess Hill), where Gill had moved with his family in 1913. A chapel had been started in 1919 and was completed for the founding. The community and families around the guild's members had grown to 41 by February 1922.

Gill left Ditchling for the former Anglican monastery at Capel-y-ffin in 1924, leaving his apprentice Cribb to take over the stone carver's workshop, but the Guild continued to flourish and attract many new members – carpenter George Maxwell, weavers Valentine KilBride and Bernard Brocklehurst, and wood-engraver Philip Hagreen. In 1932, the silversmith Dunstan Pruden joined, followed by artist and engraver Edgar Holloway.

Notwithstanding several upheavals, the affairs of the Guild eventually stabilised, and it continued for many years, later members being Jenny KilBride, who joined the weaving workshop, and the calligrapher Ewan Clayton, grandson of Valentine KilBride. Eventually, its affairs were finally wound up in 1989, and the workshops demolished.

== Ideology ==
The Guild's members wanted to protect and promote its members' work: an idea that reflected the broader Arts and Crafts movement. The community was based around work, faith, and domestic life, with workshops and a chapel. Its philosophy was encapsulated in what today might be called its mission statement, engraved on a stone plaque, now in The Wilson Museum in Cheltenham.

Men rich in virtue studying beautifulness living in peace in their houses.

Its philosophy was based on Roman Catholicism and, in particular, the Distributist ideas of G. K. Chesterton and Hilaire Belloc. Gill and Pepler's founding ideals were also heavily influenced by Vincent McNabb.

== Crafts ==
=== Printing and texts ===
A key element of the community was a private press, Saint Dominic's Press, which was run by Hilary Pepler. It enabled members to circulate their ideas to friends and supporters and provided a creative outlet for every member of their community. The books and pamphlets it produced – including the monthly journal, The Game – are much sought after today. A bibliography of the Press was published in 1995.

=== Other craft areas ===
Other areas of craft served in the Guild included stone carving, weaving, woodworking, and metalwork.

== Guild members ==
=== Eric Gill ===
Member of Guild 1920–1924 – typographer, engraver, sculptor

=== Hilary Pepler ===
Member of the Guild 1920–1934 – writer, printer

Pepler had an eclectic career, starting as a social worker before he came under Gill's influence at Hammersmith. Gill interested Pepler in the art of lettering which led to involvement in publishing. and eventually printing when he moved to Ditchling in 1916 to set up the St Dominic's Press, using a traditional handpress in preference to a more automated device. In the same year, he abandoned his Quaker faith for Catholicism. He published The Game, with Gill and Johnson, airing the views which would lie behind the foundation of the Guild. His friendship with Gill was broken by Gill's move to Wales, and was never to recover, despite the marriage of Pepler's son and Gill's daughter Betty in 1927. His interests spread beyond the Guild in the 1930s into the arena of drama and mime. His insistence on employing a non-Catholic assistant led to his acrimonious departure in 1934, his printing business continuing under the name The Ditchling Press. His mimes were performed widely in Europe and the US to great critical acclaim.

=== Desmond Chute ===
Member of the Guild 1920–1921 – engraver, later priest

Chute had a brief but important role in the foundation of the Guild. He was born in Bristol, studied at the Slade School of Fine Art from 1912, and later became friends with Stanley Spencer. Having met Gill in 1918, he soon moved to Ditchling to learn stone carving and engraving. He was to leave the Guild, however, in 1921 in order to enter the priesthood. In a letter to Chute in 1940, Gill confided, "How much I love you and how much I owe you," and it is fair to suggest that his departure was an important factor in Gill's alienation from the Guild.

Later he moved for his health to Rapallo in Italy, where he was a friend of Ezra Pound and one of the Tigullian Circle around him.

=== Joseph Cribb ===
Member of the Guild 1920–1967 – stone carver

Cribb was apprenticed to Gill in 1906 and followed him to Ditchling. Having served in World War I, he returned to Ditchling and became a member of the Guild very soon after its foundation. He took charge of the stonemason's shop after Gill's departure, specialising in inscriptions and decorative carvings for new buildings; he did a lot of work for the Brighton architects John Denman and eventually had his own apprentices, John Skelton, Noel Tabbernor and Kenneth Eager. He continued to work until his death, a true hero of the Guild.

=== David Jones ===
Postulant of the Guild 1924–1925 – painter and poet

After Gill, the most celebrated member of the Guild, due to his painting and his modernist war poem, In Parenthesis published in 1937.

In his youth, he showed an enthusiasm for drawing, which was interrupted by service in World War I. Having been drawn to Catholicism during the war, he was introduced to Ditchling by Fr John O'Connor (a friend of G. K. Chesterton), where he set about learning wood engraving. He produced some remarkable murals for the Guild chapel; in particular, the painting of Christ being mocked by soldiers attired as English Tommies reveals something of the scars left by his wartime experience. He became a Dominican Tertiary in 1923 but left to join Gill at Capel y ffin in December 1925. He was later to be briefly engaged to Gill's daughter, Petra.

Around 1928, he began writing poetry to establish his literary reputation. In 2002 he was one of the twelve featured War Poets in an exhibition at the Imperial War Museum.

=== George Maxwell ===
(1890–1957) Member of the Guild 1921–1957 – carpenter

Maxwell was a wheelwright from Birmingham, knowledgeable in theology who was introduced to the Guild by Fr McNabb. He established the carpenter's shop to specialise in hand looms and church furniture.

Maxwell was devoted to the Distributist ideal, building his own house, maintaining his own smallholding as well as writing polemical essays on the movement. One son, Stephen, was killed while serving with the Gordon Highlanders at Anzio, Italy on 12 January 1944; another, Vincent, became a priest and the third son, John joined the Guild and continued the workshop after his father's death.

=== Valentine KilBride ===
(1897–1982) Member of the Guild 1926–1981 – weaver

Disillusioned with life as an industrial worker, Kilbride was attracted to the world of crafts and began to teach himself the art of traditional weaving in 1920. In 1922, he joined the Guild of St Margaret in Scotland, where he was to develop his skills. When he was released by that guild, he came to Ditchling to work for Ethel Mairet.

Like Jones, he had heard of the Guild from Fr John O'Connor; he was to become a member in 1926, the year in which he married. Five of his six children were to become involved in weaving. Eventually, the management of the workshop was taken over by his daughter Jenny.

His lasting contribution was to pioneer the revival of gothic style liturgical vestments, designed in a conical shape. Their use has become common to the present day.

=== Bernard Brocklehurst ===
(1904–1996) Member of the Guild 1930–1941 – weaver

Brocklehurst joined the Guild as KilBride's partner. When production was suspended in 1940 due to a silk shortage, he left the area and did not return. He did, however, continue to work on liturgical vestments.

=== Philip Hagreen ===
Member of the Guild 1930–1955 – engraver, letterer

Hagreen was a leading force in the foundation of the Society of Wood Engravers in 1920; he visited Ditchling 1922, eventually following Gill to Capel y ffin in 1924. He returned to Ditchling as a member of the Guild in 1930. His lettering continued the tradition established by Johnston and Gill of simplicity and clarity with his many engraved bookplate designs; he was also a committed distributist. He retired in 1957 but continued to paint watercolours.

=== Dunstan Pruden ===
(1907–1974) Member of the Guild 1934–1946; 1968–1974 – silversmith

Pruden came to Ditchling in 1932 and became a full member of the Guild two years later. His book Silversmithing was printed by St Dominic's Press and became the foundation for his part-time teaching career at Brighton Art College. He fulfilled hundreds of commissions for ecclesiastical metalwork and in addition to working in silver and gold he made carvings in ivory. Possibly his most famous work was a gold chalice made for the Roman Catholic Cathedral in Liverpool in 1959, which bears a figure of Christ in Majesty and is made from 300 wedding rings donated by widows.

He left behind an unpublished autobiography entitled So Doth the Smith.

=== Winefride Pruden ===
(1913–2008) Member of the Guild 1975–1988 – silversmith, writer

She was taught the art of silversmithing by Dunstan and joined the Guild in 1975. She lectured widely and was the art critic for the Catholic publication The Tablet. A former President of the Society of Catholic Artists, she was made one of the first Papal dames in 1994.

=== Edgar Holloway ===
(1914–2008) Member of the Guild 1950–1988 – painter, graphic designer, engraver, and print-maker

Edgar Holloway first came to Ditchling in 1948 with an established reputation for drawing and printmaking. He learned the art of wood engraving from Philip Hagreen and became a Guild member in 1950. For the next twenty years, he turned away from engraving and concentrated on graphic design, continuing the tradition of fine hand-drawn lettering established by Gill and Johnston. In 1969, he turned to watercolours inspired by the landscapes of Wales and Sussex and in 1972 resumed engraving. He was chairman of the Guild when it closed in 1988. The last twenty years of his life saw much interest in his work with several retrospectives.

=== Kenneth Eager ===
Member of the Guild 1974–1988 – stone cutter

Originally an apprentice to Joseph Cribb in 1945, he remained at the Guild until its closure after which he retired to Malta.

=== Jenny KilBride ===
(1948–) Member of the Guild 1974–1988 – weaver and dyer

The daughter of Valentine KilBride, Jenny KilBride learned her skills from her father and in 1974 became the first woman to join the Guild. Having grown up at the Guild, she still lives in Ditchling and is Chair of the Ditchling Museum Trustees.

=== Other members ===
- Philip Baker – 1932–1939 – carpenter – brother-in-law of George Maxwell
- Mark Pepler – 1932–1933 – printer – son of Hilary Pepler
- Cyril Costick – 1932–1933 – printer
- John Maxwell – 1958–1979 – carpenter – son of George Maxwell
- Noel Knapp-Tabbernor – 1968–1978 – stonecutter
- Thomas KilBride – 1960–1988 – weaver – son of Valentine KilBride
