= The Sleeping Lord =

1974 poetry collection by David Jones

- Author: David Jones
- Language: English
- Publisher: Faber & Faber
- Publication date: 1974
- Publication place: United Kingdom
- Pages: 111

The Sleeping Lord and Other Fragments is a 1974 poetry collection by the Welsh writer David Jones. It consists of nine poems and collects most poetry Jones had published since his book The Anathemata was printed in 1952.

The poems are roughly in chronological order but also organised by content. An introductory poem is followed by four poems set in the Roman Empire, then one about the conflict between order and diversity of personality, followed by two poems with Welsh subjects. The last poem "Balaam's Ass" is a passage from Jones' abandoned project The Book of Balaam's Ass, which he had worked on before The Anathemata. The Sleeping Lord was the last book by Jones to be published in his lifetime, appearing through Faber & Faber the same year he died.

== Contents ==
- "A, a, a, Domine Deus"
- "The Wall"
- "The Dream of Private Clitus"
- "The Fatigue"
- "The Tribune's Visitation"
- "The Tutelar of the Place"
- "The Hunt"
- "The Sleeping Lord"
- "Balaam's Ass"
