= Douglas Woodruff =

British journalist and wit

- Born: 1897
- Died: 1978
- Occupations: Editor of Tablet magazine; Chairman of Burns & Oates

John Douglas Woodruff (1897–1978) was the editor of the Tablet and later chairman of the Catholic publishers Burns & Oates.

== Biography ==
Douglas Woodruff was educated at Downside School and New College, Oxford. At Oxford, he was a member of the Union's debating team; his lifelong friend Christopher Hollis was in the team as well, and they successfully toured the world. Oxford don Maurice Bowra suspected that at college Woodruff already “a Roman Catholic of the proselytizing kind, who therefore represented an immediate threat to his own flock". Woodruff was a close and influential friend of Evelyn Waugh.

From 1936 to 1967 he was the editor of the Tablet, making the periodical the leading voice of English Catholicism, and from 1948 to 1962 he was the chairman of the Catholic publishers Burns & Oates. He was an expert and essayist on Hilaire Belloc. Woodruff first met Belloc in Oxford in the autumn of 1920, having been introduced to him because he had been a friend and contemporary of Louis Belloc at Downside School.

Woodruff was part of the Catholic right-wing, and, according to Martin Redfern, one of his employees at the Tablet, he wanted a clear separation between politics and religion. In Pope Paul's New Mass, Michael Davies introduced him as "probably England's most erudite layman".

== Personal life ==
In 1933 he married Marie Immaculeé Antoinette Lyon-Dalberg-Acton (1905–1994). She was the eldest child of Richard Lyon-Dalberg-Acton, 2nd Baron Acton and Dorothy Lyon.

== Works ==
- Plato's American Republic, 1926, K. Paul, Trench, Trubner
- The Merry Jests of the Widow Edyth, 1929
- Expansion and Emigration in Early Victorian England: 1830–1865 ed. G. M. Young, 1934, Oxford University Press
- Charlemagne, 1935, D. Appleton-Century Company
- The first stage – from London to Paris in Grand tour; a journey in the tracks of the age of aristocracy, conducted by Mona Wilson, Douglas Woodruff, Edmund Blunden and others..., ed. Richard Stanton Lambert, 1937, E. P. Dutton & co.
- The story of the British colonial empire, 1939, H. M. Stationery off
- For Hilaire Belloc: Essays in Honor of His 71st birthday, editor, 1942
- Still Talking at Random, 1948, Hollis & Carter
- Essays on Church and Stateted, 1952, Hollis & Carter
- Walrus talk, 1954, Hollis & Carter
- The Tichborne Claimant: A Victorian Mystery, 1957, Hollis & Carter
- The Twentieth Century Encyclopedia of Catholicism, 1961, Hawthorn Books
- Church and State, 1961, Hawthorn Books
- The Life and Times of Alfred the Great, 1993, Weidenfeld and Nicolson

== Legacy ==
Douglas Woodruff Papers are preserved at the Georgetown University.
