= David Jones (painter) =

Welsh painter and prize-winning poet (1895–1974)

- Born: Walter David Jones; 1 November 1895; Brockley, Kent, England
- Died: 28 October 1974 (aged 78); Harrow, England
- Occupations: Poet, artist, essayist, critic
- Writing career
- Notable works: In Parenthesis, The Anathemata (poem)
- Notable awards: Order of the Companions of Honour
- Movement: Modernism

David Michael Jones CH (né David Walter Jones; 1 November 1895 – 28 October 1974) (Note: Upon his conversion to Catholicism, Jones substituted the middle name Michael for Walter; it is as David Michael Jones that he appears on the voter's register by the 1930s.) was a British painter and modernist poet. As a painter he worked mainly in watercolour on portraits and animal, landscape, legendary and religious subjects. He was also a wood-engraver and inscription painter. In 1965, Kenneth Clark took him to be the best living British painter, while both T. S. Eliot and W. H. Auden put his poetry among the best written in their century. Jones's work gains form from his Christian faith and Welsh heritage.

== Biography ==
=== Early life ===
Jones was born at Arabin Road, Brockley, Kent, now a suburb of South East London, and later lived in nearby Howson Road. His father, James Jones, was born in Flintshire in north Wales, to a Welsh-speaking family, but he was discouraged from speaking Welsh by his father, who believed that habitual use of the language might hold his child back in a career. James Jones moved to London to work as a printer's overseer for the Christian Herald Press. He met and married Alice Bradshaw, a Londoner, and they had three children: Harold, who died at 21 of tuberculosis, Alice and David.

Jones exhibited artistic promise at an early age, even entering drawings for exhibitions of children's artwork. He wrote that he knew from the age of six he would devote his life to art. He did not read fluently until the age of eight. From the very earliest years of his life he had already come to identify intensely with his paternal heritage: as an old man in 1971, he would write to Saunders Lewis of a 'passionate conviction that I belonged to my father's nation that I certainly felt by the time I was seven'. In 1909, at 14, he entered Camberwell Art School, where he studied under A. S. Hartrick, who had worked with Van Gogh and Gauguin and introduced him to the work of the Impressionists and Pre-Raphaelites. In addition, Jones studied literature, the subject of a mandatory one-hour weekly class at Camberwell.

=== World War I ===
With the outbreak of the First World War, Jones enlisted in the London Welsh Battalion of the Royal Welch Fusiliers on 2 January 1915 and served on the Western Front in 1915–1918 with the 38th (Welsh) Division. Jones spent more time on the front line (117 weeks) than any other British writer in the war. He was wounded at Mametz Wood, recuperated in the Midlands, was returned to the Ypres Salient, and joined in the attack on Pilckem Ridge at Passchendaele in 1917. He nearly died of trench fever in 1918, but recovered in England and was stationed in Ireland until the armistice of 11 November 1918. Jones's wartime experience was the basis for his long written work In Parenthesis.

=== 1920s ===
In 1919 Jones won a government grant to return at Camberwell Art School. From Camberwell, he followed Walter Bayes to the Westminster School of Art in central London, where he studied under him and with Bernard Meninsky, and was influenced by Walter Sickert, an occasional lecturer there, whom he came to know personally. Jones received instruction towards becoming a Catholic from Fr. John O'Connor, who suggested Jones visit Eric Gill and his guild of Catholic craftsmen at Ditchling in Sussex. Influenced by Gill, Jones entered the Catholic Church in 1921, chiefly, he said, because it seemed "real" in contrast to Christian alternatives. He also liked the Church's continuity with Classical antiquity. In 1922 he increasingly spent time at Ditchling, apprenticed as a carpenter but never becoming a full member of Gill's Guild of St Joseph and St Dominic. Having shown himself an incompetent carpenter, Jones turned to wood-engraving, whose rudiments Desmond Chute had taught him. In 1923 Jones worked as an illustrator, for The Game published by Gill and Hilary Pepler. He also engraved original work for Pepler's St. Dominic's Press, including The Rosary Book. When Gill moved to Capel-y-ffin in the Black Mountains of South Wales in 1923, Jones returned to London, but often visited Gill there and also the Benedictines on Caldey Island, near Tenby.

In 1927 Jones joined the Society of Wood Engravers. He illustrated The Book of Jonah, Aesop's Fables. and, for the Golden Cockerel Press, Gulliver's Travels and engraved a large, elaborate frontispiece for a Welsh translation of the Book of Ecclesiastes, Llyfr y Pregethwr. Subsequently Robert Gibbings commissioned him to illustrate, with eight large wood engravings, The Chester Play of the Deluge (1927), and Douglas Cleverdon commissioned him to illustrate, with eight large copper engravings, Coleridge's poem The Rime of the Ancient Mariner (1929). In 1930 eye-strain forced him to give up engraving.

In 1924 Jones had become engaged to marry Gill's daughter Petra, but in 1927 she broke off the engagement to marry a mutual friend. Distressed, Jones concentrated on art. Petra's long neck and high forehead continued as female features in his artwork. He returned to live with his parents at Brockley, also spending time at a house they rented on the coast at Portslade. He painted prolifically and exhibited watercolour seascapes and Welsh landscapes in London galleries. In 1927 Jones made friends with Jim Ede, at the Tate Gallery, who introduced him to art critics and prospective buyers, including Helen Sutherland, who became a patron. Ede introduced him to the painter Ben Nicholson, who in 1928 had Jones elected to the Seven and Five Society, whose other members included Barbara Hepworth, Winifred Nicholson, Cedric Morris, Christopher Wood, and Henry Moore. Jones remained a member until 1935, when he was expelled by Nicholson for not painting abstracts. Disappointed by published accounts of personal combat experience during the war, in 1928 he began writing In Parenthesis, a fictional work based on his own experiences in the trenches. He was now in love with Prudence Pelham, who was its muse.

=== 1930s ===
From 1929 through the mid-1930s, Jones took part in weekly meetings at the Chelsea house of his friend Thomas Ferrier Burns of what has been called the Chelsea Group. It included the cultural historian Christopher Dawson, the philosopher E. I. Watkin, the type-designer Stanley Morison, Harman Grisewood, Bernard Wall, Eric Gill, Martin D'Arcy and others. They discussed a wide range of topics in relation to Catholic Christianity and sought a religious-cultural counterpart to the Unified Field Theory sought by Einstein. To these discussions, Jones contributed his psychological theory of culture, focusing on the balance of utility (efficiency) and gratuity (beauty, truth, goodness) required for healthy civilization. The Chelsea Group would be the matrix of The Anathemata, The Tablet, edited by Tom Burns, and the Third Programme, the BBC's cultural radio station developed and produced by Grisewood.

Jones had long suffered from shell-shock, now known as post-traumatic stress disorder. It contributed to a nervous breakdown in mid-October 1932, precipitated by four months of prolific painting and writing, involving 60 large paintings and the first continuous draft of In Parenthesis. His friends arranged for him to take a therapeutic trip to Jerusalem, which did not alleviate his condition, but influenced his later poetry. His breakdown precluded painting for most of the next 16 years. He was able to work at revising In Parenthesis. As he revised, he read it aloud to close friends, including Jim Ede, who alerted Richard de la Mare at Faber and Faber, to whom Jones agreed to submit it when complete. In 1937 it was published to very positive reviews and in 1938 won the Hawthornden Prize, then the one major British literary award.

Though Jones was unable to paint, his visual works were shown in Chicago in 1933, at the Venice Biennale in 1934, and at the World's Fair, New York, in 1939. In 1944 an exhibition of his art work toured Britain.

=== Later life ===
Jones spent most of the Second World War in London, enduring the Blitz. He painted a few important pictures, and to celebrate the wedding of his friend Harman Grisewood to Margaret Bailey, wrote Prothalamion and Epithalamion, which were eventually published posthumously.

In 1947 Jones created, in a single week, ten land-and-skyscapes at Helen Sutherland's house in Cumberland. As in 1932, this burst of activity precipitated a nervous collapse. He underwent psychotherapy at Bowden House in Harrow on the Hill, under the psychologist William ('Bill') Stevenson. Influenced by Freud, Stevenson traced Jones's breakdown to oedipal and sibling tensions, combined with repressed fear during the war, explaining that, if allowed to strengthen, repression in the sexual domain shifted to repression of artistic freedom. He advised Jones to paint and write as essential to his healing. This led Jones throughout the 1950s to make many beautiful painted inscriptions (an art form he invented), along with sometimes numinous still lifes of flowers in glass chalices. He was able to publish in 1952 his epic-length poem The Anathemata.

In 1954 an Arts Council tour of his work visited Aberystwyth, Cardiff, Swansea, Edinburgh and the Tate Gallery, London. In 1960, Stevenson began prescribing barbiturates and other harmful drugs that sent Jones's creative life into a virtual standstill for the next 12 years, though he struggled to revise and shape mid-length poems for inclusion in The Sleeping Lord (1974), a project he managed to complete after the prescriptions were terminated in the summer of 1972. In 1974 Jones was made a Member of the Order of the Companions of Honour, an honour restricted to 65 living members (excluding honorary appointments).

=== Death ===
In 1970 Jones broke the ball of his femur in a fall and thereafter lived in a room at Calvary Nursing Home in Harrow, where he was regularly visited by friends and died in his sleep on 27–28 October 1974. He is buried in Ladywell Cemetery within the now renamed twinned London Borough of Lewisham's Brockley and Ladywell Cemeteries formerly and respectively 'Deptford Cemetery' and 'Lewisham Cemetery'. In 1985, he was among 16 Great War poets commemorated on a slate stone unveiled at Poets' Corner in Westminster Abbey.

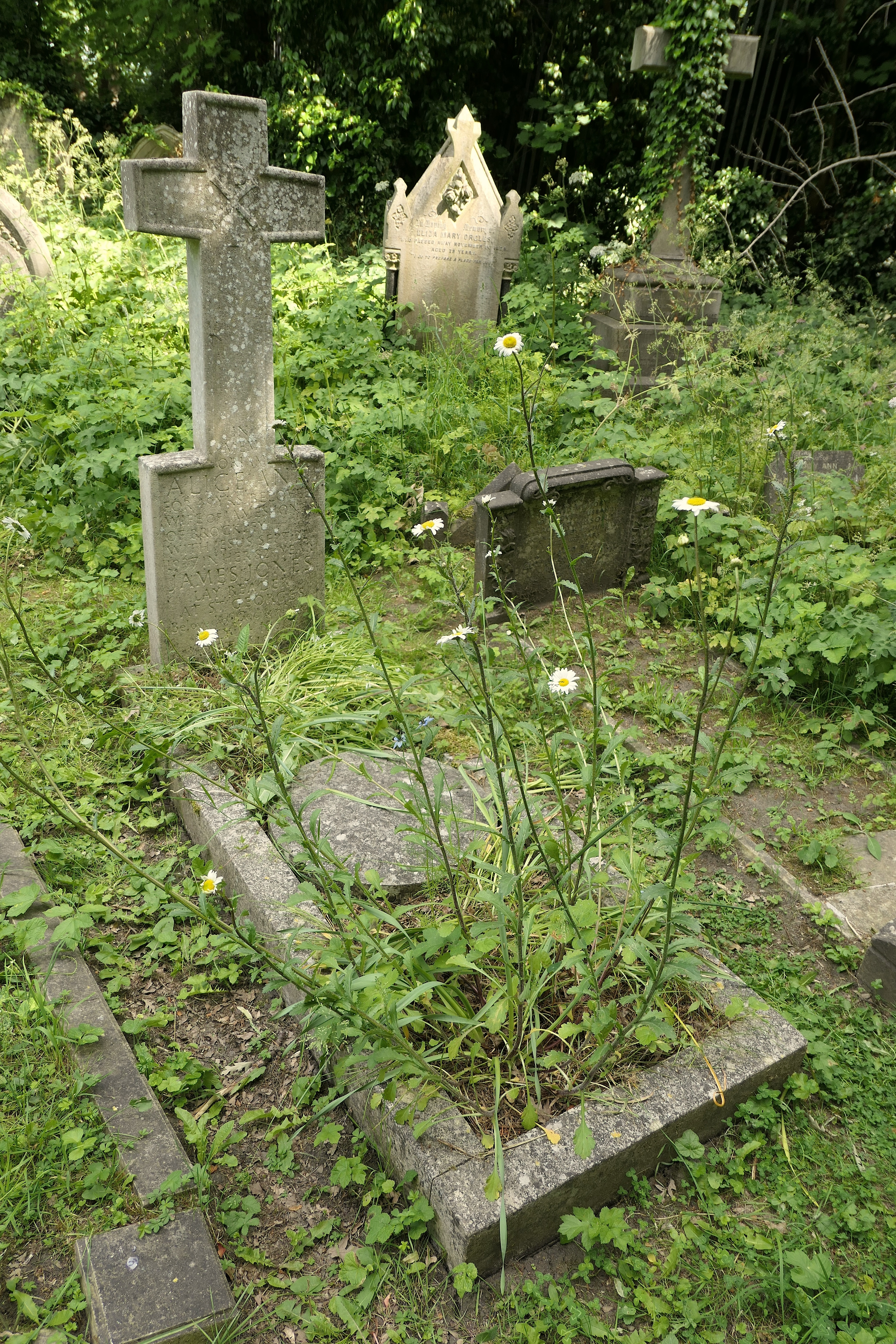
The grave of David Jones and his parents in the London Borough of Lewisham's 'Ladywell Cemetery'.

== Art ==
Although Jones began exhibiting paintings in London galleries in 1919, his chief public creative expression was initially engraving. Soon after learning how to engrave, he entered the vanguard of the renewal of wood-engraving as an artform (instead of the reproductive craft it had been through most of the 19th century). He was among the first modern engravers to combine white-line and black-line engraving. His two acknowledged masterpieces of book illustration are The Chester Play of the Deluge (1927) and The Rime of the Ancient Mariner (1929). In both of these, engravings mirror one another in design and are arranged in the text to form a chiasmic structure. Jones would use this structure to give unifying symbolic form to his epic-length poem, The Anathemata.

His meager income came chiefly from painting, which evolved in style throughout his life. Breaking from art-school realism, he adopted the thick-boundary-line and sculptural style of Christian primitivism, which had affinity with the style of the London School. The dramatic landscape of Capel-y-ffin liberated him from fixed, stationary point of view. Having drawn maps during World War I, he reverted to thin-line "drawing with the point", which he had learned of from Hartrick. Painting the sea at Caldey Island and Portslade opened him to see water and sky as continuous, an active continuity that came to include the land. The subtleties of his mostly watercolour paintings after 1929 require patient and repeated viewing. In the 7 and 5 Society he was influenced by Winnifred Nicholson in painting freely, relying on more colour, less line, coming close to abstraction. After his first breakdown he painted Aphrodite in Aulis and two Arthurian paintings that, loaded with symbols, are "literary" in requiring "reading" as well as viewing. He longed to combine such multi-symbolic work with his earlier stylistic freedom. And he achieved such a combination in his painted inscriptions, which involve mostly ancient texts. In juxtaposing quotations, these inscriptions are modernist in aesthetic. Most are in Latin or Welsh because he wanted them viewed, not read. Saunders Lewis was the first to note that these inscriptions combine Jones's painting with his poetry. Union of symbolism with freedom is also achieved in his still-lifes of flowers in glass chalices. In undergoing so much change, Jones's visual art managed to be alive as only the new can. As a painter, he was, according to Kenneth Clark, "absolutely unique, a remarkable genius".

== Poetry ==
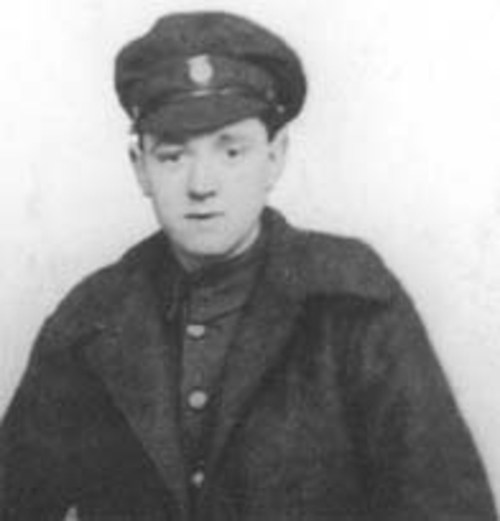
David Jones in uniform in 1917

In Parenthesis (1937) is a work of literature based on Jones's first seven months in the trenches culminating in the assault on Mametz Wood during the Battle of the Somme. It is a dense mixture of polyphonic of voices, varying in register, in verse and prose. Although often regarded as a poem, Jones describes In Parenthesis as a "writing". His literary debut, it won high praise from reviewers, many of them former servicemen, for whom its vivid language evoked the realities of trench warfare. They saw its allusions to the horrors of romance and to the battles of history and legend (all seen as defeats) as accurately expressing the feelings of men in combat. The poem draws on literary influences from the 6th-century Welsh epic Y Gododdin to Shakespeare's Henry V, Thomas Malory's Morte d'Arthur, the poetry of Gerard Manley Hopkins and Anabase by Saint-John Perse (translated by Eliot), in an attempt to be true to the experiences of combatants. The cumulative force is emotionally powerful. That and the reader's having got to know the infantrymen involved makes the concluding visitation of the dead by the Queen of the Woods a deeply moving literary experience. On 11 July 1937 when he met Jones, W. B. Yeats elaborately praised In Parenthesis. T. S. Eliot considered it "a work of genius". W. H. Auden declared it "the greatest book about the First World War." The war historian Michael Howard called it "the most remarkable work of literature to emerge from either world war." Graham Greene in 1980 thought it "among the great poems of the century." In 1996 the poet and novelist Adam Thorpe said "it towers above any other prose or verse memorial of ... any war." Herbert Read called it "one of the most remarkable literary achievements of our time." It is probably the greatest literary work on war in English.

Also epic in length (244 pages with Introduction), The Anathemata (1952) is Jones's poetic summa, a symbolic dramatic, multi-voiced anatomy of Western culture. Sweeping back and forth through prehistory and historical periods, it focuses thematically on the making of gratuitous signs as an activity essential to humanity, which flourishes during vital culture phases and languishes in predominantly pragmatic periods, such as ours and that of imperial Rome. The poem moves digressively, as interior and dramatic monologues open to include other monologues, forming a chiastic structure of eight concentric circles. The outer circle is formed by the poem beginning with the elevation of the host during the consecration of the Mass and ending 200 pages (6 or 7 seconds) later with the elevation of the chalice. At the centre of the work's chiastic circles is a lyrical celebration of the events contained sacramentally by the Eucharist. Symbolically the structure means that the Eucharist as a super-sign of God's loving union with humanity is contained and sustained by everything in the poem, from Anglo-Saxon cultural genocide to a medieval lavender seller's remembered sexual liaisons. Its chiastic recession of circles makes this the only modernist long poem "open" in form that is structurally unified. After reading and rereading it for six months, W. H. Auden called it "probably the greatest poem of the twentieth century" and compared it to the inclusive, culturally authoritative long poems of Homer, Virgil, Dante, Chaucer, and Milton. Jones thought it was "worth 50 'In Parentheses'" and the most important of any work he had done.

Until 1960, Jones worked intermittently on a long poem, of which material in The Anathemata had initially been meant to form part. Jones used sections of the left-over material mainly in the magazine Agenda and collected it in The Sleeping Lord and Other Fragments (1974). A posthumous volume of the unseen material was edited by Harman Grisewood and René Hague and published by Agenda Editions as The Roman Quarry. It has since been re-edited by Thomas Goldpaugh and Jamie Callison in The Grail Mass (Bloomsbury 2018). In these drafts, the monologue material of Judas and Caiaphas has a quality that certainly deserved to be published by Jones in his lifetime.

In 2002, three short poems by Jones appeared for the first time in Wedding Poems, edited by Thomas Dilworth. Jones had written two of these, "Prothalamion" and "Epithalamion", totalling 271 lines, during the Blitz in London. The third, the 24 lines of "The Brenner", arose on 18 March 1940 to mark a meeting of Benito Mussolini and Adolf Hitler on the Brenner Pass.

The Sleeping Lord (1974) contains one short poem, "A, a, a, Domine Deus", a lament for contemporary technological impoverishment), and eight mid-length poems: four of them monologues, or involving monologues, by Roman soldiers stationed in Jerusalem at the time of Jesus's crucifixion. Three others involve Celtic personae. The final mid-length poem is a darkly comical consideration of an assault during the Battle of Passchendaele, in which Western tradition and its values confront mechanized mass suicide. More than any other collection or sequence of poems in English, these works test traditional values in the face of modern mechanized war, technological pragmatism and political totalitarianism. Seamus Heaney thought them "extraordinary" writing. The American poet W. S. Merwin called them "some of Jones's great splendours". Among them, "The Hunt" (beautifully recorded by Jones) and "The Tutelar of the Place" are musically especially lyrical – they ought to be anthologized. These eight mid-length poems – and first of all these two – probably make the most welcome start to reading Jones's poetry.

== Essays ==
Jones's occasional essays on art, literature, religion and history, introductions to books and talks on the BBC Third Programme have been collected in Epoch and Artist (Faber, 1959), The Dying Gaul (Faber, 1978) and David Jones on Religion, Politics, and Culture: Unpublished Prose (Bloomsbury, 2018). The most important essays include "Art and Sacrament", his fullest exposition of his theory of culture; "Use and Sign", his most succinct exposition of that theory; "Introduction to 'The Rime of the Ancient Mariner'", intriguing in itself and helpful for appreciating The Anathemata; and "The Myth of Arthur", deepening understanding of "The Hunt" and the concluding, eponymous poem in The Sleeping Lord and, with these two poems, an important contribution to the Matter of Britain'. Harold Rosenberg wrote that Jones's essays on culture "formulated the axiomatic precondition for understanding contemporary creation." Guy Davenport saw in them that Jones "realized for us the new configuration, which only our time can see, into which culture seems to be shaped, and the historical processes that shaped it."

== Reputation ==
With the centenary of the 1914–1918 War, Jones gained wider attention through British TV documentaries, notably War of Words: Soldier-Poets of the Somme on the BBC. Since 2014 Jones has increasingly been seen as an original, major poet and visual artist of the 20th century.

Judging from its rapidly rising prices, Jones's visual art is now fairly well and widely appreciated. Several notable exhibitions of his engravings, paintings and inscriptions, during his life and since, have attested to the popularity of his visual art, most recently Vision and Memory at the Pallant House Gallery, Chichester. His visual works can now be seen online, in talks on Jones by Dilworth and films directed by Derek Sheil such as David Jones Innovation and Consolidation.

Jones has been less appreciated as a poet, partly because his long, highly allusive poetic works are hard reading for many. Although In Parenthesis received positive reviews in 1937 and won the Hawthornden Prize in 1938, reader interest was cut short by the Second World War, which eclipsed interest in the earlier war. Until recently, In Parenthesis and The Anathemata have been missing from most academic studies of literary modernism. The fault is their publisher, Faber, which from the start failed to list them as poems or Jones as among its poets. (The Anathemata was strangely listed under Autobiographies and Memoirs.) Not until 1970, after complaints by William Cookson, editor of Agenda, and Stuart Montgomery, editor of The Fulcrum Press, did Faber correct the error, long after the Modernist canon had been established, largely by the American New Critics. Since 1970, academic assessment of Jones's poetry has been catching up with his reputation as a visual artist. But the process was initially stalled by Paul Fussell's judgement against In Paraenthesis in The Great War and Modern Memory (Oxford, 1975), as glorifying war by alluding to romance, a judgement that continues to discourage scholarly engagement, even though repeatedly effectively refuted. And the liturgical allusions and eucharistic focus in his later poetry do not appeal to most academics, who are secular-minded. The voices calling attention to his poetry have mainly been those of creative practitioners rather than academics. T. S. Eliot saw Jones as "of major importance", "one of the most distinguished writers of my generation." Dylan Thomas said, "I would like to have done anything as good as David Jones." In 1974 Hugh MacDiarmid pronounced Jones "the greatest native British poet of the century." In 1965, Igor Stravinsky thought him "perhaps the greatest living writer in English". The art historian Herbert Read called him in 1964 "one of the greatest writers of our time".
