= Kenneth Eager =

Kenneth Eager (2 January 1929 – 22 September 2013) was an English stone sculptor, and wood carver, who was part of The Guild of St Joseph and St Dominic founded by Eric Gill in Ditchling, Sussex. From 1945, Eager was an assistant to Joseph Cribb at the Guild, and remained there after Cribb's death in 1967 until its closure in 1989.

Eager commuted daily to Ditchling from his home in Brighton. Notable work by Eager included the headstone at Clayton, West Sussex, for Sir Norman Hartnell, dressmaker to Queen Elizabeth II, the Pelham Memorial in Falmer's parish church, and he carved a baptismal font for Telscombe Catholic church.

Eager married Audrey Sumner in 1954, they had a son. Sumner survived him at his death.
