= Harman Grisewood =

English actor (1906–1997)

Harman Grisewood CBE
- Born: Harman Joseph Gerard Grisewood; 8 February 1906; Broxbourne, Hertfordshire, England
- Died: 8 January 1997 (aged 90)
- Education: Worcester College, Oxford
- Occupations: Radio actor; radio and television executive; writer
- Years active: 1929–1987
- Spouse: Margaret Clotilde Bailey (m. 1940)
- Children: 1

Harman Joseph Gerard Grisewood CBE (8 February 1906 – 8 January 1997) was an English radio actor, radio and television executive, novelist and non-fiction writer. He acted as literary executor to the poet David Jones, a lifelong friend.

He was educated at Ampleforth College and Worcester College, Oxford. He joined the young BBC not long after graduating in 1927. He was controller of the BBC Third Programme from 1948 to 1952. He is credited with the idea in 1966 for The Money Programme.

In 1960, he was appointed Commander of the Order of the British Empire (CBE) and also became a Knight of Grace and Devotion (Knight of Magistral Grace) of the Sovereign Military Order of Malta.

== Early life and education ==
Harman Grisewood was born at Wormleybury Manor in Hertfordshire to Lieutenant Colonel Harman Joseph Mary Grisewood and Lucille Genevieve Cardozo. His mother was the youngest daughter (3 August 1881) of Henry O'Connell Cardozo, C.I.E. and had been brought up in India. His father was born on 20 Oct 1879 at Gatwick House, Billericay, Essex, educated at Beaumont, Downside School, and Christ Church, Oxford; and served in the Royal Buckinghamshire Yeomanry, the Fourth Hussars and 11th Bn Royal Sussex Regiment. He served as Aide-de-camp to George Curzon, 1st Marquess Curzon of Kedleston in South Africa in the Boer war. In 1909 he became Privy Chamberlain of Sword and Cape to Pope Pius X, a position of honour which is now known as a Gentleman of His Holiness. He was a handsome, unreliable, sociable wanderer who Harman described as 'one of Baudelaire's true travellers'.

Harman had two younger brothers, Peter Henry (15 June 1907 – 1973) and Gabriel Thomas (23 March 1910 – 17 February 1986) who was known as Tucks. His younger sister Mary Magdalen Lucy Teresa (11 December 1911 – 1950) was known as Missie. When he was young the family moved to the Prebendal in Thame, Oxfordshire, a rambling 13th century house, much of it in ruins, which had its own chapel and resident Catholic priest – Father Randolph Traill. In his autobiography, One Thing at a Time (1968), he described an outing with his brother, nanny, nursemaid and pram, when they were stoned by villagers as they approached the Anglican church. The nursery was the centre of the children's world, whilst adults and children were 'on equal terms' in the chapel. A devout Roman Catholic, he bemoaned the demise of the Tridentine Latin Mass in 1970 but remained loyal to the Church, as he explained in Why Am I Still a Catholic, published in 1980.

His grandmother Concetta Messina lived mainly at the Villa Marguerite at Grasse, France, where she ran an eccentric household. After his Oxford days he spent time at Grasse; in Cyprus where his family had property; and with an uncle in Malta.

In 1916, aged 10, he was sent to Ampleforth College, along with his younger brothers. The classroom became his refuge and he befriended Father Bernard McElligot who was a key figure in both the monastery and school for over 25 years, and who remained a friend until his death in 1990.

He won a history scholarship to Worcester College, Oxford and became a leading member of Oxford University Dramatic Society (OUDS), where he befriended Robert Speaight, Sir Gyles Isham, 12th Baronet, Peter Fleming, Rupert Hart-Davis, Baron John Redcliffe-Maud and Christopher Sykes. In his last year he shared rooms with Sir Denys Buckley who became a High Court judge, and to whom Grisewood said he owed a love of English ways. Theodore Komisarjevsky cast him as King Lear in his OUDS production.

He left Oxford with little sense of direction and took a job writing labels at Fortnum and Mason in London where he earned £3 per week. Very much part of the Brideshead generation, he spent many of his evenings at Lord Kinross's parties at Yeomans Row, Knightsbridge.

== BBC career ==
=== BBC drama ===
In 1929 a friend from his Oxford days invited him read a chapter of Ivanhoe on The Children's Hour for the BBC at Savoy Hill House. He was paid three guineas so he resigned from Fortnum and Mason and spent the next four years acting in radio plays with the BBC Repertory Company.

He performed with Peggy Ashcroft, John Gielgud and Ralph Richardson at a time when Val Gielgud had just taken over the drama department. Grisewood's most taxing effort was in Christopher Marlowe's Edward II when, during the interval, he rushed to the Variety Studio to perform a Vaudeville song in John Watt's show.

=== Announcer, abdication crisis ===
In 1933 he joined the BBC staff as an announcer and continued until 1936. He embarked on an arduous self-education plan catching up on T. S. Eliot and Christopher Dawson whose Progress and Religion had great influence on him. Jacques Maritain's neo-Thomistic Art and Scholasticism became the central text for Grisewood and his Catholic friends. Like Eric Gill, who they admired they redefined the autonomy of art, denying the conventional distinction between the sacred and profane. Grisewood wrote "we do not believe the art of Salvator Rosa was religious because he painted so many pious Madonnas and the art of Renoir was not because he painted none." They believed that lowly practices such as plumbing and feeding pigs were not to be despised and that the BBC announcing was part of the scheme of things.

Disillusionment set in over Edward VIII's abdication crisis. In September 1936 he was involved in anxious discussions about what would happen if the King decided that he wished to broadcast without the previous knowledge of the government and the Director General. Grisewood felt that the King should be able to broadcast whenever he liked without any consultations and resolved that if he were on duty and received a telephone request from the King he would give him full facilities. The King's broadcast was transmitted from Windsor Castle with Lord Reith in attendance, a watershed, and Grisewood knew that many of the values he believed in had been defeated permanently.

From 1936 until 1939 he was 'Assistant to the Programme Organiser'. From 1939 to 1941 he was 'Assistant Director Programme Planning'.

=== Wartime – Assistant Controller, European Division ===
From 1941 to 1945 Grisewood was 'Assistant Controller, European Division'. This was major leap from a relatively obscure post in Broadcasting House to become second in command to Sir Ivone Kirkpatrick at Bush House, London. Kirkpatrick, a career diplomat, had been transferred by the Government using its wartime powers, from the Foreign Office to the new post of controller of the European division, responsible to the Director-General. Grisewood was appointed as a balancing influence with broadcasting skills. He was acting controller from 1945 to 1946.

Later in 1946 he was demoted to 'Director – Talks Division' (or Assistant head) where he was restless: disliking the departmental in-fighting and what he saw as an increasing left-wing bias, he resigned in July 1947.

=== Third Programme ===
Sir George Barnes, the newly appointed head of the new BBC Third Programme, persuaded him to return and within two months he returned as planner. Then from 1948 to 1952 he was controller of a Third Programme that became aligned so closely with his interests and attitudes as to be almost an extension of himself. Christopher Sykes worked as his assistant controller on the Third Programme.

He saw the Third Programme as "fundamental to our civilization" as it was then on the great classical repertory of literature and music. Its finest hour was the Festival of Britain in 1951. He was an unrepentant elitist, if elitism means grappling with the not immediately obvious. He believed that difficulty had a value, both in creative and in personal terms and eagerly accepted his role as defender of the highbrow in early post war Britain. The third programme should intensify or refine culture in an age of mass participation. He was aware of the dangers of cultural fragmentation between 'experts' in increasingly specialised academic and professional disciplines.

Grisewood was not especially surprised or disconcerted when, in 1948, there began to be reports of a downturn in the audience with only two Third Programme listeners per 1,000 members of the population. Indeed, he enjoyed the denigration of the programme by the "hunting men and brigadiers."

=== 1950s – Director of the Spoken Word ===
In 1952 Grisewood succeeded George Barnes as 'Director of the Spoken Word'. With responsibility of news, religion, talks and education, the job was powerful although as Grisewood commended "the title was absurd". Here he was at the cutting edge of controversy since the most persistent complainants about the BBC policy were educationalists, politicians and clergy. The post was abolished in 1955 in the reorganisation that followed the setting up of a television news division.

=== Assistant to the Director General ===
He later became chief assistant to two director generals, first Sir Ian Jacob and then Sir Hugh Greene. His close connection with Greene involved him in the arguments surrounding new progressive policies at the BBC.

Grisewood, in his position as Assistant Director General of the BBC, was portrayed by Nicholas Woodeson in the 2008 TV programme Filth: The Mary Whitehouse Story.

== Writing ==
Following his retirement Grisewood was at the centre of a major sensation. His autobiography One Thing at a Time (1968) described the conflict over Anthony Eden's attempt to force the BBC to treat the Suez Crisis of 1956 as a national war. Grisewood claimed that this included a plan to take over the BBC completely quoting Eden's press secretary William Clark. Clark later maintained that the plans had never been so drastic but there was a buzz of scandal and the story was debated in the House of Commons.

At the time in question Sir Ian Jacob, Director-General of the BBC, was absent abroad. Grisewood insisted that differing views of the crisis taken by public and press must be reported in both overseas and UK broadcasts, and that the opposition had a right to reply to Government broadcasts. His influence was crucial in the Governor's decision to resist pressure from Eden and to protect the BBC's tradition of impartiality.

He published three novels, The Recess, The Last Cab on the Rank, and a spy story Stratagem as well as The Painted Kipper. He is remembered for his stories, poetry, and letters.

== Personal life ==
Grisewood married Margaret Clotilde Bailey in 1940, during the Second World War Blitz on London. They spent their wedding night under the kitchen table in Chelsea with the poet and artist David Jones as bombs fell around them. Jones wrote two poems as wedding gifts, "Prothalamion" and "Epithalamion", which eventually were published in the 2002 collection Wedding Poems. The couple then spent their honeymoon at Pigotts, Eric Gill's craft community set in the beechwood forest at Speen, Buckinghamshire. During his career at the BBC he lived in London and had one daughter.

The BBC presenter Freddie Grisewood was a cousin.

== Later life and death ==
He lived alone for his last decades in Eye, Suffolk, the last surviving member of the group of Roman Catholic intellectuals and artists that included David Jones, Tom Burns and Rene Hague, Eric Gill's son in law. The concept of dumbing down always appalled to him. He wrote a very caustic and persuasive paper De proclivitate ad levitatem (of a propensity towards shallowness) during the later part of his life. Grisewood was a worldly ascetic whose changeling quality can be seen in David Jones's portrait in National Museum Wales.

He died on 8 January 1997.

== Works ==
- Broadcasting and Society: Comments from a Christian Standpoint (1949)
- David Jones, Epoch and Artist: Selected Writings (1959) editor
- The Recess (1963) novel
- The Last Cab on the Rank (1964) novel
- David Jones: Writer and Artist (1965)
- One Thing at a Time (1968) autobiography
- The Painted Kipper: A Study of the Spurious in the Contemporary Scene (1970)
- David Jones, The Dying Gaul and Other Writings (1978) novel
- David Jones, The Roman Quarry and Other Sequences (1981) editor with René Hague
- Strategem (1987) novel
