= E. M. O'R. Dickey =

Wood engraver (1894–1977)

Edward Montgomery O'Rorke Dickey (1 July 1894 – 12 August 1977), known as E. M. O'R. Dickey, was an Irish wood engraver who was active at the beginning of the twentieth century. He was a founder member of the Society of Wood Engravers.

== Biography ==
Dickey was born in Belfast on 1 July 1894, the son of Edward O'Rorke Dickey. He later married Eunice Emmeline Howard; they had one son, Daniel. He was educated at Wellington College and Trinity College, Cambridge. He studied painting under Harold Gilman at the Westminster School of Art.

He was art master at Oundle School and then became professor of fine art and director of King Edward VII School of Art, Armstrong College, Durham University from 1926 to 1931. From 1931 to 1957 he was staff inspector of art in the Technical Education Branch of the Ministry of Education. In 1934, along with a colleague W M Keesey, he compiled a report Industry and Art Education on the Continent, a publication that, arguably, was a significant influence on both the uptake of modernist theory in English educational establishments and the development of industrial design as a practice in Britain. Dickey was also a significant voice in official deliberations that led to the formation of the Council of Industrial Design in 1944.

At the beginning of the Second World War he was seconded from the Ministry of Information and, from 1939 to 1942, was secretary of the War Artists' Advisory Committee. In his memoirs, Kenneth Clark, the originator of the committee, recalled 'discovering' in Dickey 'the perfect secretary to the committee', noting 'he had begun life as a serious painter [and] knew all the ins and outs, and was devoted and resourceful beyond measure.' He was a full member of the committee from 1942 to 1945. During this period he established a close relationship with Eric Ravilious.

He was appointed a CBE in 1952.

Dickey became the first curator of The Minories, Colchester, a post he held for five years from 1957 to 1962.

== His wood engravings and oil paintings ==
Dickey was a founder member of the Society of Wood Engravers in 1920, and exhibited with them from 1920 to 1924. He was at his most active in the early 1920s and virtually all his engravings date from this period.

In 1922 he contributed a wood engraving to Contemporary English Woodcuts, an anthology of wood engravings produced by Thomas Balston, a director at Duckworth and an enthusiast for the new style of wood engravings. Campbell Dodgson, Keeper of Prints and Drawings at the British Museum, wrote about him in his introduction to the book: Mr. Hagreen and Mr. Dickey are among the engravers who rely very much upon the effective use of white lines and spaces. This was a limited edition of 550 copies, as was the only book that he illustrated with wood engravings, Workers by the Irish writer Richard Rowley, published by Balston at Duckworth in 1923.

Dickey devoted more time to working in oils. He was one of the most experimental painters in Ireland technically and stylistically. He painted extensively on the continent, and showed at the Royal Academy and the New English Art Club. He was elected to the London Group in 1920. He had several one-man exhibitions, at the Leicester Galleries in 1923, at the Manchester City Art Gallery in 1924, and the Beaux Arts Gallery in 1935.

There are a number of examples of his oil paintings in public collections.

== An overview of Dickey's work ==
Dickey's lasting legacy, rather than his wood engravings and oils, is his distinguished contribution to arts administration and art education.
