= Llanthony Abbey =

Monastery in Wales

Coordinates: 51°58′33″N 3°05′27″W

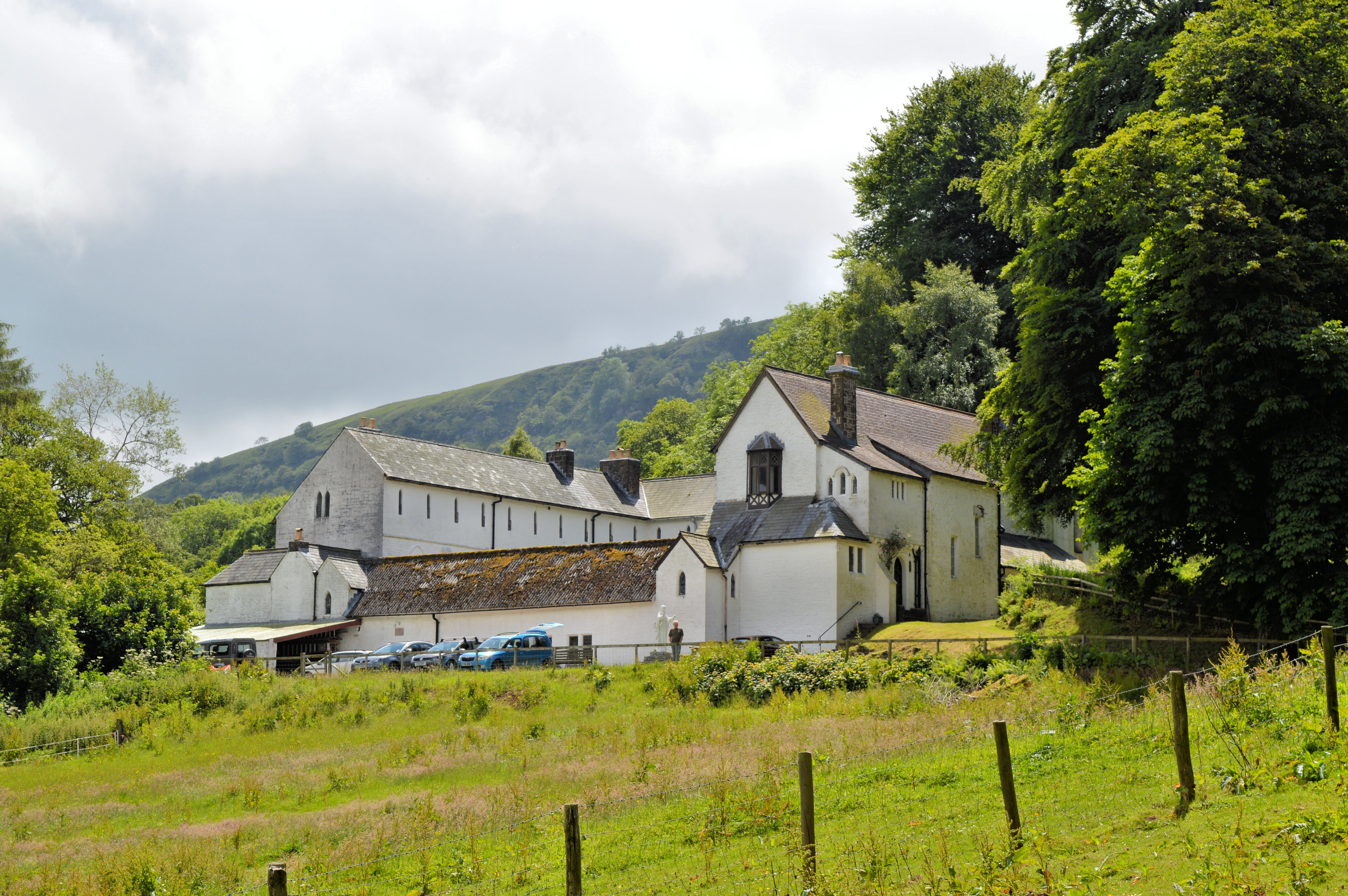
- The monastery buildings
- Interactive map of Llanthony Abbey

Monastery information
- Order: Anglican Benedictine (unrecognised)
- Established: 1869
- Disestablished: 1908

People
- Founder: Father Ignatius (Joseph Leycester Lyne)

Llanthony Abbey is a former Anglican monastic institution founded in 1869 by Joseph Leycester Lyne (Father Ignatius), in the Welsh village of Capel-y-ffin, a few miles from the medieval Llanthony Priory. It survived until 1908, after which it was the home of artist Eric Gill. It is now holiday accommodation.

It was also known as Llanthony Tertia – following on from the nearby original medieval Llanthony Priory, and its Gloucestershire offshoot Llanthony Secunda – or New Llanthony Abbey. The surviving buildings are now referred to as Capel-y-ffin Monastery.

== History ==
=== Father Ignatius ===
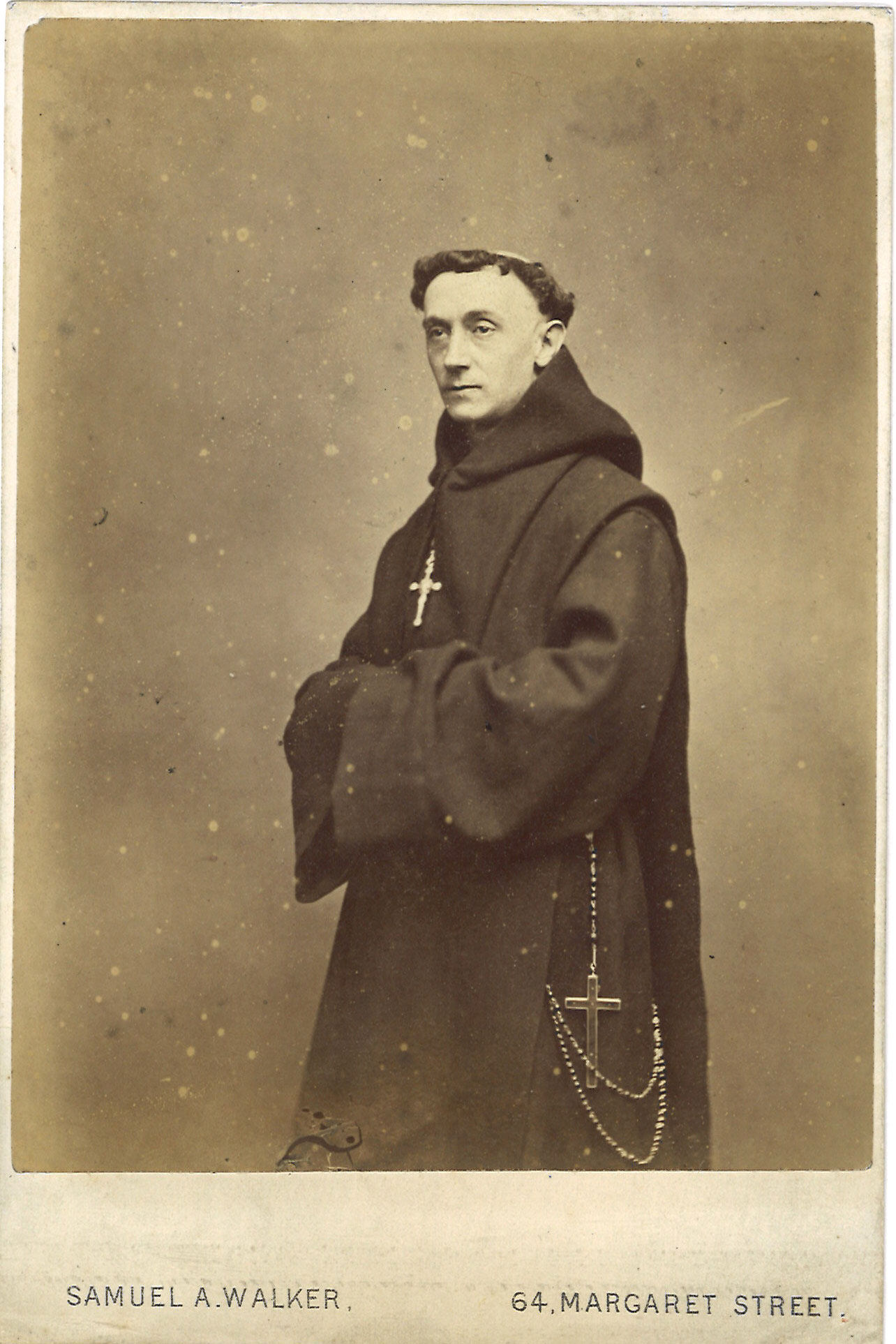
Father Ignatius of Llanthony

In 1869, Joseph Leycester Lyne, self-styled "Father Ignatius", purchased 32 acres (130,000 m^{2}) of land at Capel-y-ffin in order to build an Anglican monastery near the ruins of Llanthony Priory.

The cloister was begun in 1870, and the church in 1872. John Loughborough Pearson succeeded Charles Buckeridge as architect in 1873.

In 1880, Lyne's religious convictions were confirmed by visions of the Virgin Mary seen in the monastery and nearby fields by monks and local farm boys.

Building stopped in 1882.

The eccentric version of monastic life practised at the abbey was observed and recorded in the diaries of Francis Kilvert.

=== After Lyne's death ===
Lyne died in Camberley on 16 October 1908, and was buried in the church at Llanthony Abbey.

In his will he stated:

I leave the Monastery of Llanthony, the convent and monastery church thereof, and the garden and other lands (if any) now held and enjoyed therewith, including the farms of Trecas and Ty-Gwynne, and all that they contain (save those few things hereinafter mentioned and specifically bequeathed) unto Alfred Harris (Father Asaph) and Jessie Dow (in religion Mother Tudfil) of the Convent of Llanthony, absolutely, as joint tenants, subject to the right of my adopted son, William Leycester Lyne, to continue farming the lands of the said monastery as he is now farming, at a nominal rent of one shilling, in return for the services which he renders and shall render to the monastery as before

— Will of Joseph Lyne

Shortly after Lyne's death, the community – then consisting of Father Asaph, Mother Tudfil, four monks, two nuns and two sisters, elected the Rev Richard Courtier-Forster, then a curate at St Giles' Church, Cambridge, to succeed Ignatius as Abbot. Receiving no objection from the Bishop of St David's, he accepted. However, shortly afterwards, Asaph Harris went to Canada to be ordained by wandering bishop René Vilatte, who had earlier ordained Lyne. When Harris returned to England, Courtier-Forster resigned, and all real hope of regularising the Llanthony Benedictines as an Anglican foundation ended.

In 1911, the abbey passed into the hands of the Anglican Benedictine community of Caldey Island. The Caldey Benedictines, including Asaph Harris, collectively submitted to Rome in 1913. Harris lived until 1960 as part of the Caldey, and later Prinknash Abbey, communities.

Fr Ignatius's abbey church, which was never completed, fell into disrepair before the Gill family arrived and the roof was removed during the 1930s.

=== Eric Gill ===
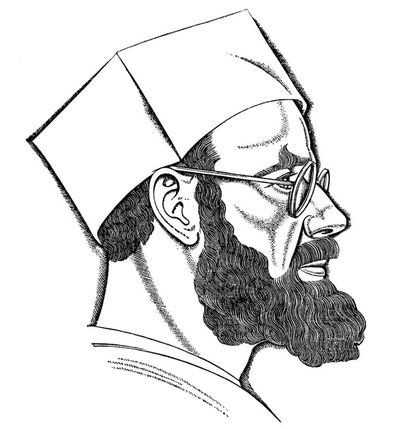
Eric Gill (self portrait)

From August 1924 to October 1928, the artist Eric Gill and his followers, associated with The Guild of St Joseph and St Dominic, lived in some of the former monastery. It was here that Gill designed the typefaces Perpetua and Gill Sans. With him was the poet and artist David Jones, who painted the local scenery.

=== Later use ===
For two years or so around 1969, the monastery was the home of the controversial Carmelite friar and writer Father Brocard Sewell, who withdrew there after he had written to The Times questioning Catholic teaching on birth control and criticising the papal encyclical Humanae Vitae; though in the end no sanction was imposed on him.

In 1967 responsibility for upkeep of the church was transferred to a new ecumenical body, the Father Ignatius Memorial Trust, of which Sewell was a founder member. Extensive restoration work was subsequently carried out on both the surviving abbey walls and Ignatius's grave within. As the structure was fundamentally unsound, this work has been only partially successful, and as of April 2018 public access is denied.

The trust also cares for a statue of the Virgin Mary commemorating her alleged apparitions at the monastery in 1880, as well as a memorial calvary opposite the site of the related ‘holy bush’. A considerable collection of archives and artefacts has been assembled under the auspices of the Trust, most of which is housed at the Abergavenny Museum. The tabernacle which formerly stood on the high altar of the abbey church and various pictures are cared for by the present owners of the monastery but are not normally on view.

The monastery is now holiday accommodation.

The church and monastery are both grade II Cadw listed buildings.
