= Ditchling Museum of Art + Craft =

Museum in East Sussex, England

View of Ditchling Museum of Art + Craft

Edward Johnston's Way Out, Brompton Road, 1916

Ditchling Museum of Art + Craft is located in Ditchling, East Sussex, England (50°55′19″N 0°6′59″W, OS Grid Reference TQ 32486 15293). It specialises in showcasing the artists and craftspeople who made Ditchling a creative hub in the 20th century, such as Eric Gill, the sculptor, printmaker and typeface designer, Edward Johnston, designer of the London Underground font, and printer Hilary Pepler. These artisans were associated with The Guild of St Joseph and St Dominic, an offshoot of the Arts and Crafts movement.

The museum is located in the centre of the village just below Saint Margaret's Church on a site that was founded in 1985 by sisters Hilary and Joanna Bourne as a place to display their collection of local artworks. In 2012, a renovation project was commenced with funding of £2.3M via a grant from the Heritage Lottery Fund and other donors. The refurbishment, completed in late 2013, was designed by London practice Adam Richards Architects. The museum was then opened by Nicholas Serota. It is a registered charity under English law.

The building dates to 1836, when it was the first village national school. It began with one classroom and a schoolmaster's cottage. In 1887, the school was extended, and by 1915, enrolled 128 pupils. After the school closed in 1983, the Bourne sisters saved the building from demolition and developed it into their museum.

In 2026 the museum announced that due to financial pressures it would close from February 2026 for at least the rest of the year to allow the trustees to investigate new business models for the organisation, with all staff made redundant as part of the closure.
