= Wedding Poems =

2002 poetry collection by David Jones

- Editor: Thomas Dilworth
- Author: David Jones
- Language: English
- Publisher: Enitharmon Press
- Publication date: April 2002
- Publication place: United Kingdom
- Pages: 88
- ISBN: 9781900564878

Wedding Poems is a posthumous poetry collection by the Welsh writer David Jones. Edited by Thomas Dilworth and published by Enitharmon Press in April 2002, it collects two previously unpublished poems Jones wrote in September 1940 as wedding gifts for his friends Harman Grisewood and Margaret Bailey who married in London during the Blitz. Because the marriage ended in divorce, Grisewood forbade their publication during his lifetime.

The shorter "Prothalamion" (transl. before the bridal chamber) was written on 14 September 1940 and commemorates the ongoing Blitz. The longer "Epithalamion" (transl. in the bridal chamber) was drafted on 18 September 1940 and is about Western culture since the Middle Ages. It celebrates women and condemns "merchants' rule", and is influenced by how Eric Gill in the essay "Sculpture on Machine-made Buildings" connected the latter to decadence and slavery.

An appendix also contains Jones' "The Brenner, March 18 1940", an occasional poem he sent to Grisewood about the meeting of Adolf Hitler and Benito Mussolini at the Brenner Pass, where Jones makes historical associations, uses heroic epithets and hopes the two leaders will create peace.
