= John Skelton (sculptor) =

British letter-cutter and sculptor

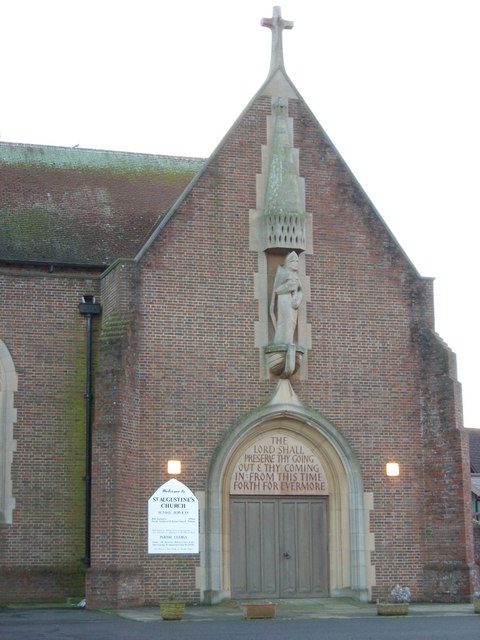
St Augustine's Church, Bexhill-on-Sea

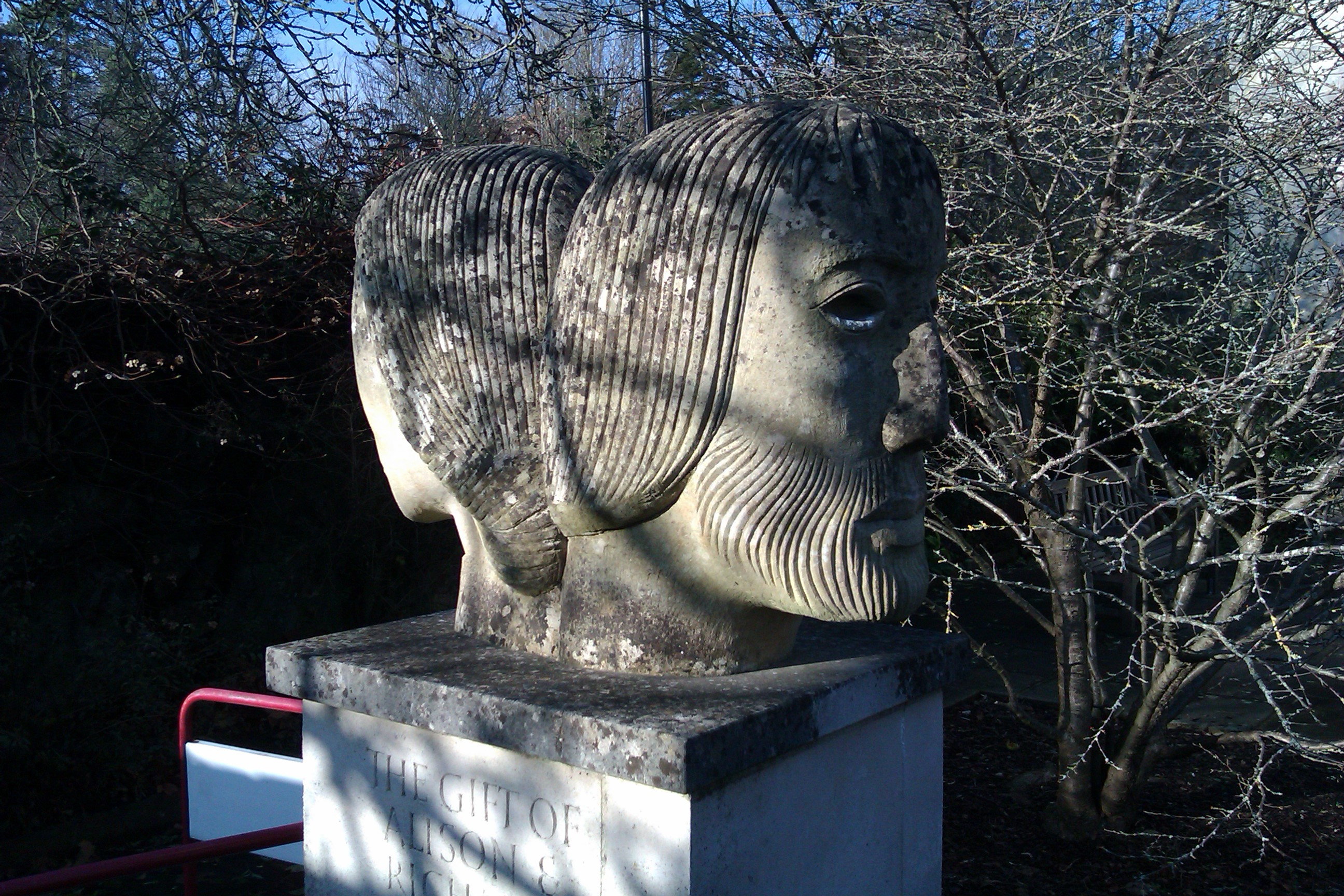
Janus Head (1997), Grange Gardens, Lewes

John Stephen Skelton MBE FRBS (8 July 1923 – 26 November 1999) was a British letter-cutter and sculptor.

Skelton was a nephew of Eric Gill and was first apprenticed to his uncle, shortly before Gill's death. He continued his training under Joseph Cribb.

His public work includes the headstone to Edward James at West Dean, a sculpture of St Augustine above the church of that dedication in Bexhill-on-Sea, and the font at Chichester Cathedral (1983). Norwich Cathedral (Our Lady of Pity Sculpture, 1967–8), Salisbury Cathedral (inscriptions) and Winchester Cathedral (inscriptions and side altar) show other examples. Other displays can be found in Stratford-upon-Avon, in the Shakespeare Centre and the adjacent Shakespeare Birthplace Garden, while at St. Paul's Cathedral there are plaques designed by Skelton in memory of 10 Allied Field Marshals of the World War II and Ivor Novello.

A memorial to the generals of World War II is in St Paul's Cathedral Crypt, London. A tablet commemorating a member of the ship's company of the Mary Rose is in Portsmouth Cathedral.

His brother Christopher Skelton published John Skelton, A Sculptor's Work, in 1977 with a foreword by Joan Ellis. Skelton contributed to Dr Judith Collins' 1998 catalogue on Eric Gill's sculpture.

Worthing Museum and Art Gallery acquired The Diver (1970), a carving in walnut wood, in 2008; this was made possible through the V&A Purchase Fund and the Friends of the Worthing Museum. In 1993, he exhibited "Skelton at Seventy" in his own house and garden. Skelton exhibited a stone marble carving of a young female's breasts named 'Headrest', which was displayed at the A4E lottery-funded exhibition at Odintune Place, Plumpton, called The Travelling Art Show, in 1997.

Skelton was elected a Fellow of the Royal Society of British Sculptors in 1963. He was elected as Master of the Art Workers' Guild in 1985, and was awarded an MBE in 1989.

He married Myrtle Bromley Martin in 1948, and had two daughters and one son. His daughter Helen trained as a sculptor and works at his workshop.
