= The Tablet =

Catholic newspaper published in London

- April 11, 2026 issue of The Tablet
- Editor: Brendan Walsh
- Categories: Catholicism
- Frequency: Weekly (except Christmas)
- Total circulation: 18,772 (publisher's statement) (2017)
- First issue: 16 May 1840
- Company: Tablet Publishing Company
- Country: United Kingdom
- Language: English
- Website: thetablet.co.uk
- ISSN: 0039-8837

The Tablet is a Catholic international weekly review published in London. Brendan Walsh, previously literary editor and then acting editor, was appointed editor in July 2017.

== History ==
The Tablet was launched in 1840 by a Quaker convert to Catholicism, Frederick Lucas, 10 years before the restoration of the Catholic hierarchy in England and Wales. It is the second-oldest surviving weekly journal in Britain.

For the first 28 years of its life, The Tablet was owned by lay Catholics. Following the death of Lucas in 1855, it was purchased by John Edward Wallis, a Catholic barrister of the Inner Temple. Wallis continued as owner and editor until resigning and putting the newspaper up for sale in 1868.

In 1868, the Rev. Herbert Vaughan (who was later made a cardinal), who had founded the only British Catholic missionary society, the Mill Hill Missionaries, purchased the journal just before the First Vatican Council, which defined papal infallibility. At his death he bequeathed the journal to the Archbishops of Westminster, the profits to be divided between Westminster Cathedral and the Mill Hill Missionaries. The Tablet was owned by successive Archbishops of Westminster for 67 years. In 1935, Archbishop (later Cardinal) Arthur Hinsley sold the journal to a group of Catholic laymen. In 1976 ownership passed to the Tablet Trust, a registered charity.

From 1936 to 1967, the review was edited by Douglas Woodruff, formerly of The Times, a historian and reputed wit whose hero was Hilaire Belloc. His wide range of contacts and his knowledge of international affairs made the paper, it was said, essential reading in embassies around the world. He restored the fortunes of The Tablet, which had declined steeply. For many years (1938–1961) he was assisted by Michael Derrick, who after the Second World War was often acting editor. Woodruff was followed as editor by the publisher and, like Woodruff, part-owner Tom Burns, who served from 1967 to 1982. Burns, a conservative in his political views, was a progressive on church matters, firmly in favour of the Vatican II church reforms. A watershed came in 1968, when The Tablet took an editorial stance at odds with Pope Paul VI's encyclical Humanae vitae, which restated the traditional teaching against artificial contraception. Burns was followed by the BBC producer John Wilkins, who had been Burns's assistant from 1967 to 1971. Under his editorship the journal's political stance was seen as centre-left. The paper continued to have a distinctive voice, consistently advocating further changes in the church's post-Vatican II life and doctrine. Circulation climbed steadily throughout Wilkins's 21-year tenure. He retired at the end of 2003. Catherine Pepinster, formerly executive editor of The Independent on Sunday, became the first female editor of The Tablet in 2004. She said that "the journal will continue to provide a forum for 'progressive, but responsible Catholic thinking, a place where orthodoxy is at home but ideas are welcome'." In 2012 ITV journalist Julie Etchingham became the review's first guest editor, leading a special issue on the CAFOD charity. On succeeding Catherine Pepinster as editor on 12 July 2017, Brendan Walsh said: 'I will do all I can to cherish and protect its values and the quality of its journalism.'

Contributors to The Tablet have included Popes Benedict XVI and Paul VI (while cardinals), the novelists Evelyn Waugh and Graham Greene, Mark Lawson, Francine Stock, Peter Hennessy, Henry Wansbrough and Bernard Green.
