= Desmond Chute =

English poet and artist (1895–1962)

The Reverend Desmond Macready Chute TOSD
- Born: 1895; Bristol
- Died: 1962; Rapallo

Desmond Macready Chute (1895–1962) was an English poet and artist, who became a Catholic priest in 1927.

== Early life ==
He was born in Bristol, the son of James Macready Chute (1856–1912) and his wife Abigail Philomena Henessy (1855–1931). His father ran the Prince's Theatre, Bristol, the family business. His mother was the second daughter of Joseph Henessy of Richmond Terrace, Clifton, Bristol, a cattle-dealer: the Henessy family were Irish Catholics, Liberal in politics. Abigail Chute was on good terms with Grace Mary Welch of Cheltenham, mother of Werburg Welch who later became a close friend of Desmond.

Chute was educated from 1906 at Downside School, where he was taught by the classicist Nevile Hunter Watts. He went on in 1912 to the Slade School of Art in London. In 1913 he exhibited some paintings, and in 1914 he had a show of portraits at the New English Art Club. His mother had taken over the Bristol theatre on his father's death in 1912, and on the outbreak of war in 1914 Chute returned to Bristol to support her. Brocard Sewell concludes that he was exempt from military service during World War I.

Chute was a close friend of Stanley Spencer, from 1915, and the period when Spencer was a medical orderly at the Beaufort War Hospital in the Bristol area. During the war years and into the 1920s he was encouraging Spencer to become a Catholic convert. In a letter of 1928 to Richard Carline, Spencer alluded to a passage in Confessions, a work given to him in 1916 by Chute, as a religious influence.

== Ditchling and the Third Order of Saint Dominic ==
In 1918 Chute encountered Eric Gill at work in Westminster Cathedral. The contact resulted in Chute's participation in the craft community at Ditchling, Sussex. It had grown up over the previous decade around Gill and others. Chute became a close colleague, assistant and "beloved brother" of Gill.

Gill completed his work on the Stations of the Cross in the cathedral, and it was consecrated on Good Friday 1918. He had been exempted from conscription while he was engaged on the task. He was called up in September of that year, to a Royal Air Force camp at Blandford. He left Chute in charge at Ditchling, and he oversaw Gill's household and workshop. He worked under Gill of a set of Stations of the Cross, for John O'Connor at St Cuthbert's Church in Bradford. He published poetry in The Game, the community's magazine. His mother was a principal patron of the Guild in its early days.

In 1920 Gill and his wife Mary, Chute, Hilary Pepler and Herbert Shove became Tertiaries, joining the lay Third Order of Saint Dominic. Chute was already a member of the Third Order of Saint Francis. Chute, Gill and Pepler went on to found The Guild of St Joseph and St Dominic. Influential in this further step was Vincent McNabb OP. Gill knew him already, having met McNabb at the Edinburgh house of André Raffalovich. McNabb provided an economic theory and pointed to the works of Thomas Aquinas. Pepler's St. Dominic's Press published works by McNabb and other Catholic writers, illustrated by Chute, Philip Hagreen and other Ditchling artists. Some years later the ruralist views of McNabb found expression in Distributism.

David Jones arrived in Ditchling in 1921, as an assistant to Gill. Chute befriended him, and taught him wood carving. That year, Chute started to study for the Catholic priesthood, in Fribourg at the Albertinum, the international Dominican priory there. He put the Bristolian Douglas Cleverdon in touch with Gill in the mid-1920s.

== Priest in Italy ==
Chute's studies to become a priest were interrupted by bouts of tuberculosis. He was ordained priest on 25 September 1927, at Downside School. He then moved for his health to Rapallo, Italy.

There Chute knew William Butler Yeats, Ezra Pound, Olga Rudge, and the Tigullian Circle musical society they promoted. He also knew Max Beerbohm. He had English visitors, including at Christmas 1936 the Gills, and Christopher Dawson and his wife. He did work for the Apostleship of the Sea at Genoa, which had papal recognition.

Chute tutored Mary de Rachewiltz, Pound's daughter with Olga Rudge. This was during the period 1941 to 1943, and Mary gave an account of him in her memoirs:

Thin and very tall, a long, pale face, with lots of hair and a beard (dyed red), melodramatically stretched out on couches with layers of capes and blankets and three kinds of curtains at the windows that had to be drawn at the least change of light outside, a series of eyeglasses and eyeshades and reading lamps. His health was poor, his eyesight very delicate.

Another account, by the physician Pietro Berri:

...the figure of a priest, tall, but of a wan complexion, with a beard at one time golden, but gradually streaked with grey, always sporting dark glasses for the greater protection of his sight, or an eyeshade ...

Chute supported Mary and her mother when Pound was arrested and deported by the US army. In the last year of World War II, Chute himself was deported from Rapallo as enemy alien. He was interned at Bobbio, where he worked in a hospital, kept a journal, and did research on the history of the Abbey.

Chute's radio memoir Poets in Paradise was broadcast by the BBC in 1955.

== Death and legacy ==
Chute died and was buried in Rapallo. According to his wishes, his grave carried the inscription Pulvis attamen sacerdos (dust yet a priest). A memorial designed by Eric Gill stands in Canford Cemetery, Westbury-on-Trym, near Bristol. Some of his papers are held in the Eric Gill Collection at Chichester, and others by his relation, David Charles Manners.
