= Daniel Grisewood =

Publisher (1934 – 2003)

Daniel Grisewood BSc (1934–2003), British packager and publisher, was the co-founder of Grisewood & Dempsey in 1973, and the founder of Kingfisher Books in 1978. He also managed Éditions Larousse.

Daniel Grisewood was born in Nicosia in Cyprus on 25 October 1934, and educated at Fort Augustus Abbey School. He graduated BSc from the University of St Andrews in 1959.

In 1988, he sold Kingfisher Books, and Grisewood & Dempsey, to Groupe de la Cité.

His brother is a catholic parish priest, who serve at St. Peter and Paul Church, Taipei, Taiwan.
