= Michael Biggs (sculptor) =

Irish sculptor

- Born: 26 August 1928; Stockport, Cheshire, United Kingdom
- Died: 1993 (aged 64–65)
- Known for: Letter cutting, stone carving
- Spouse: Frances Dooly (m. 1953)
- Children: 5

Michael Biggs (26 August 1928 – 1993) was an Irish sculptor, stone carver and letterist of English extraction.

== Early life ==
Biggs was born in Stockport in 1928. He was educated at St Columba's College, Dublin and attended Trinity College Dublin in 1946–49, but did not graduate.

== Career ==
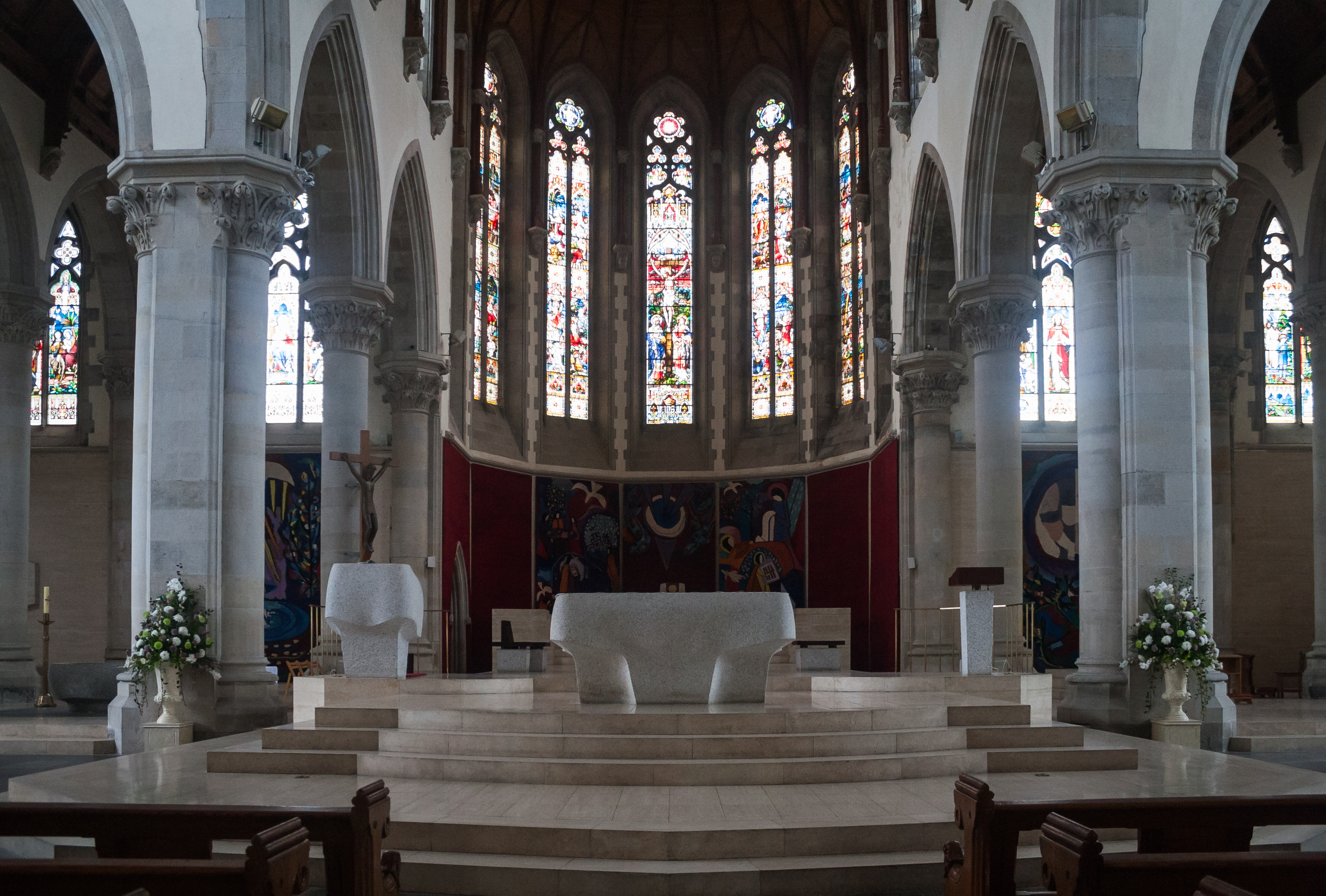
Main altar of St Macartan's Cathedral, Monaghan, sculpted by Michael Biggs

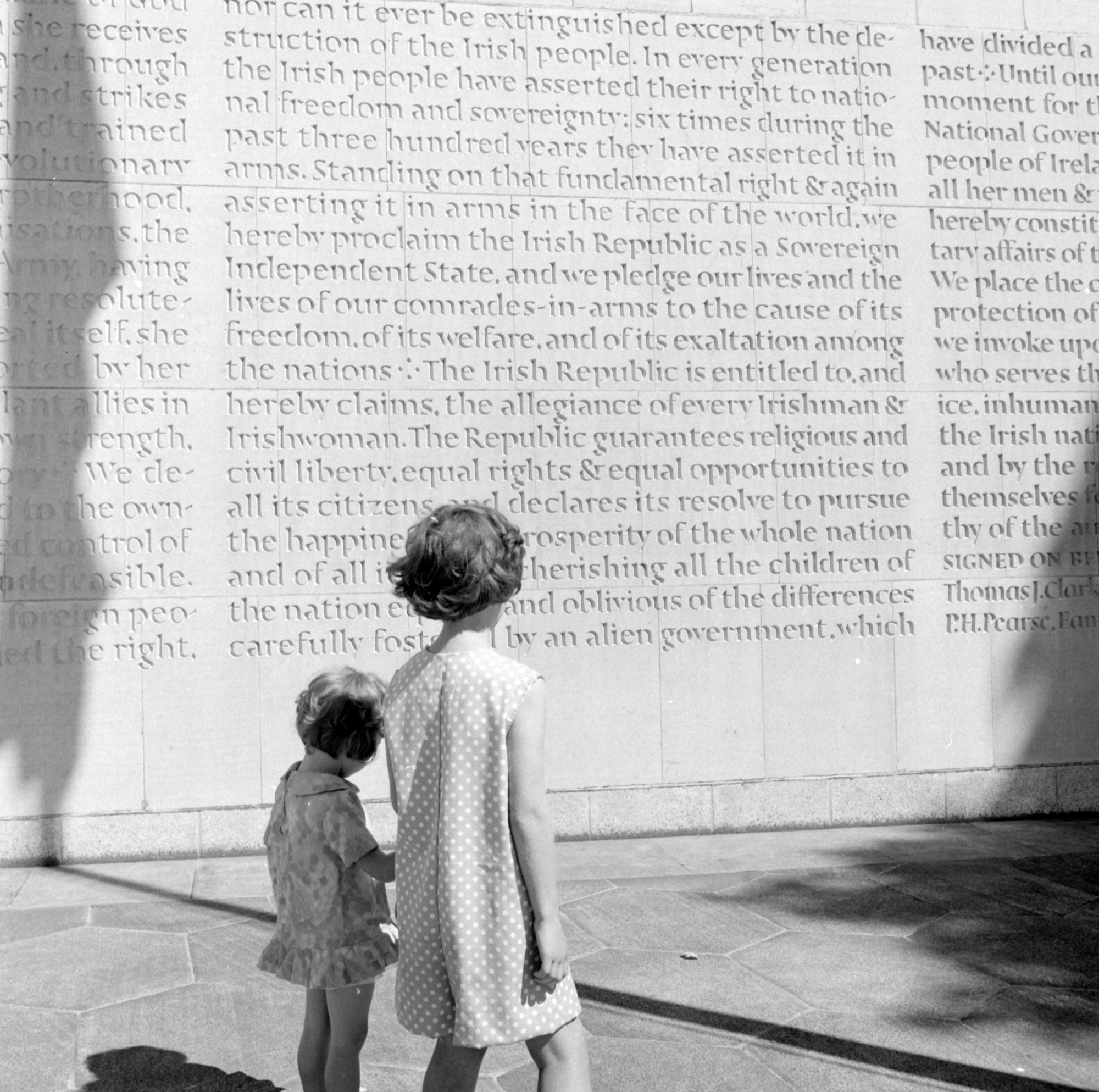
Entire text of the 1916 Proclamation of the Irish Republic, carved on the Arbour Hill memorial by Biggs

Biggs learned with Joseph Cribb in 1948–1951. He attended an artist's community in Ditchling, Sussex, founded by Eric Gill, and Biggs became well known as a carver, letterist and engraver. He also studied under Elizabeth Rivers.

A notable work of his was the Gaelic type used by Dolmen Press. He also designed the lettering for the Series B Banknotes of the Irish pound.

Inscription stones at Ballintober Abbey, Co. Mayo after the restoration by Percy Le Clerc in 1968 were carved by Biggs. The care he took with this commission is outlined in the Le Clerc Collection Ms. 10049, in the Library of Trinity College, Dublin.

He was elected to the elite artistic institution Aosdána in 1989.

== Personal life ==
Biggs was married to Frances Dooly, a violinist, artist, and designer of stained-glass and tapestries; they had five children. He converted to Roman Catholicism late in life and was buried at St. Patrick's Church, Enniskerry.
