= Tom Burns (publisher) =

Thomas Ferrier Burns (21 April 1906 – 8 December 1995), publisher and magazine editor, was an important figure in mid-20th-century Catholic publishing in Britain.

== Life ==
Burns was born in Vina Del Mar, Chile, to Clara (née Swinburne) and David Burns. His father was a Scotsman and his mother was a Chilean of English and Basque descent. Burns was brought up in England and educated at Jesuit schools, first at Wimbledon College and then at Stonyhurst College. His first job, in 1926, was on the staff of the newly founded publishing firm Sheed and Ward. In 1935 he moved to Longmans. At Longmans he backed Graham Greene's project to write about the persecution of the Catholic Church in Mexico, which led directly to The Lawless Roads (1939) (US title Another Mexico), and indirectly to The Power and the Glory (1940).

From 1940 to 1944 he was press attaché to Sir Samuel Hoare, British ambassador to Spain. In 1944 he married a Spanish bride, Maria Isabel Marañón, daughter of Gregorio Marañón. The couple had three sons and a daughter.

After the war Burns was appointed managing director of Burns & Oates, the Catholic publishing house founded by James Burns, his great-uncle. From 1935 to 1985 Burns was a director of the Tablet Publishing Company, and he was editor of The Tablet from 1967 to 1982. The furore over Humanae Vitae, Pope Paul VI's encyclical reaffirming the traditional ban on contraception, was his first challenge as editor, and Burns, quoting John Henry Newman, decided to take the line "to conscience first and to the Pope afterwards".

He was awarded an OBE in 1983.

== Publications ==
- Tom Burns, The Use of Memory: Publishing and Further Pursuits. London: Sheed & Ward, 1993. ISBN 0-7220-9450-7
