= In Parenthesis =

1937 work of literature by David Jones

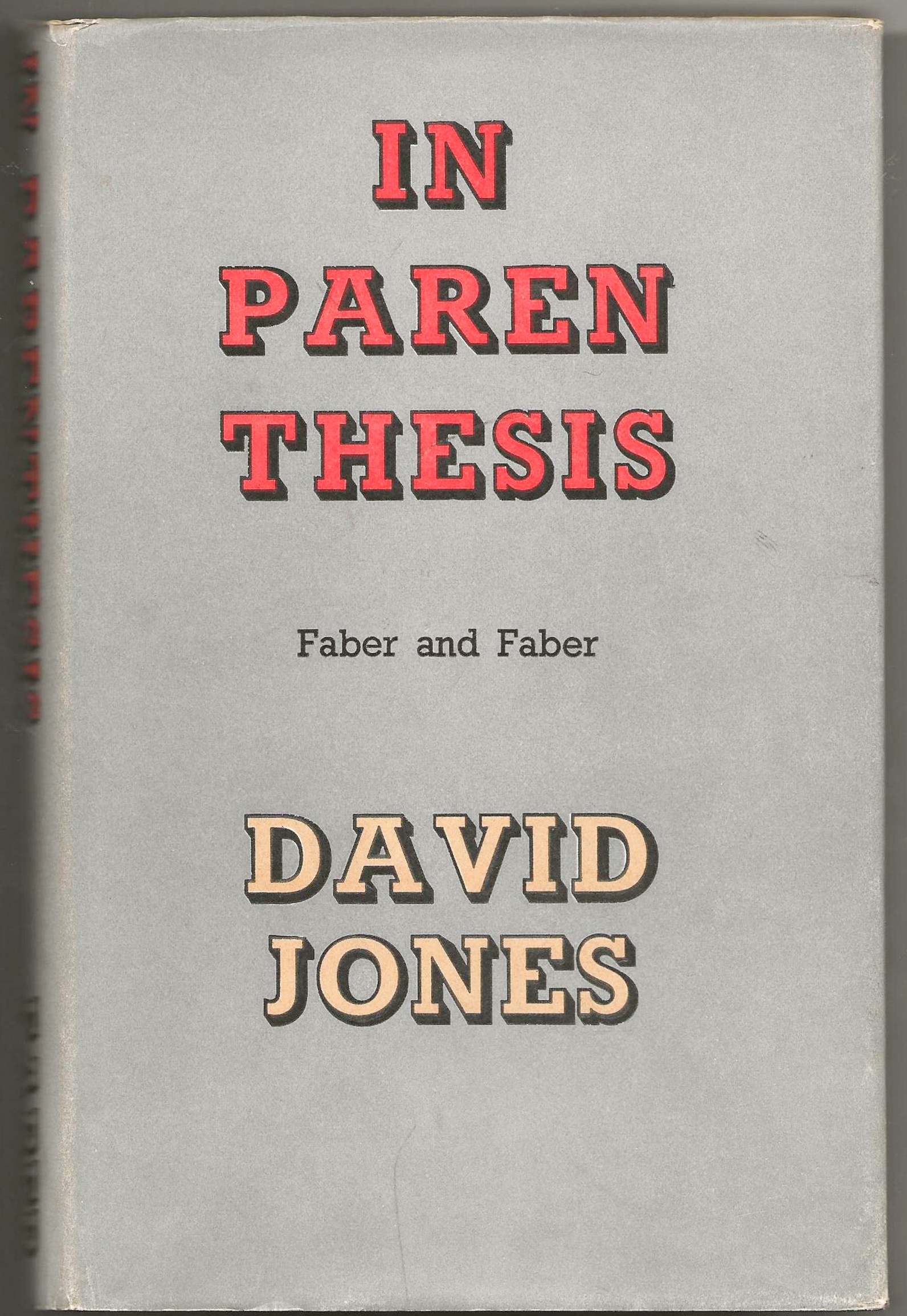
- First edition 1937
- Author: David Jones
- Language: English
- Publisher: Faber and Faber
- Publication date: 1937
- Media type: Print
- Pages: 224

In Parenthesis is a work of literature by David Jones first published in England in 1937. Although Jones had been known solely as an engraver and painter prior to its publication, the book won the Hawthornden Prize and the admiration of writers such as W. B. Yeats and T. S. Eliot. Based on Jones's own experience as an infantryman in the First World War, In Parenthesis narrates the experiences of English private John Ball in a mixed English-Welsh regiment, starting with embarkation from England and ending seven months later with the assault on Mametz Wood during the Battle of the Somme. The work employs a mixture of lyrical verse and prose, is highly allusive, and ranges in tone from formal to Cockney colloquial and military slang.

In Parenthesis is often described as an epic poem. Some critics, such as Evelyn Cobley and Umberto Rossi (who carried out a detailed analysis of Part 7), consider In Parenthesis a destructured novel, not a poem. In his preface and the dedication, Jones refers to the text as a "writing".

== Summary ==
In Part 1, Ball and his battalion assemble march to Southampton and sail at night across the English Channel. In Part 2, they receive instruction and training and travel towards the front, where Ball has the shattering experience of a long-range heavy explosive shell exploding nearby. In Part 3 they march at night along a road and then through flooded communication trenches to a position in the front line. As Ball stands sentry, narrative realism gives way to Irish and Welsh mythic associations. Part 4 concerns a typical day in the front line, from morning stand-to evening stand-down, alternating between fatigue duty, horrendous violence, and boredom. This day is circular in shape, with echoing allusions centring on the great, long boast of Dai Greatcoat. He is the archetypal soldier who has fought in previous historical, legendary, and scriptural conflicts and who never dies. Part 5 is a montage of events in estaminets and work parties in reserve (behind the lines) where rumours abound, culminating in their long march south towards the Somme. In Part 6 they are moved into various positions, and Ball meets and talks with friends. In Part 7 they begin their assault and fight through the day and into the night. Soldiers die whom the reader has come to know. Ball is wounded. In one later passage, the mythic Queen of the Wood visits the dead, bestowing on them garlands according to their worth. Part 7 is the most fragmented, most allusive, most lyrical part of the book. The work is preceded by the poet's 7-page Preface and followed by his 33 pages of notes. It is accompanied (in some editions) by his frontispiece-drawing of a soldier standing in the waste land and his endpiece-drawing of a spear-pierced scapegoat.

== Allusions ==
The allusions throughout are literary, historical, and scriptural/liturgical (where references to scripture are generally understood to carry the significance of their use in Catholic liturgy). The literary allusions include Shakespeare, primarily Henry V, Coleridge's Rime of the Ancient Mariner and Christabel, Lewis Carroll's Alice books, and The Song of Roland but they also include Malory, The Gododdin, The Mabinogion, and the sixth-century Welsh poem Preiddeu Annwn (The Spoils of Annwn). The principal cumulative effect of these allusions is symbolically to align the Battle of the Somme with the catastrophic (for the Welsh) defeats at Catraeth and Camlan. Far from "romanticizing" war, allusions to romance give to battle frightening archetypal force and express the combatants' preverbal intensity of emotion. Allusions to scripture (especially the Book of Revelation) contribute to this effect.

== Theme ==
At the centre of the book, Dai Greatcoat says that "you", the reader, "ought to ask" questions (like the Grail-questor): "Why ... what's the meaning of this." It is a question about war but also about life in general. In his preface, Jones writes that he did not intend this to be a "War Book". Life has always involved war (and suffering and dying), so if war has no meaning neither does life. The answer to the question may lie in Malory's Beaumains (alluded to on p. 118), whose true character is disguised by employment as a kitchen boy. However painful the circumstances in life, meaning resides in the virtue (courage, patience, kindness) of human beings, in this case infantrymen.

== Reception and analysis ==
T. S. Eliot called it "a work of genius". W. H. Auden considered it "a masterpiece", "the greatest book about the First World War" that he had read, a work in which Jones did "for the British and the Germans what Homer did for the Greeks and the Trojans" in a masterpiece comparable in quality to The Divine Comedy. The novelist and poet Adam Thorpe says it "towers above any other prose or verse memorial of that war (indeed, of any war)". The Jones scholar Thomas Dilworth writes that it is "probably the greatest work of British Modernism written between the wars" and "the greatest work of literature in English on war".

A discussion of In Parenthesis was published in Jones's lifetime by John H. Johnston. Paul Fussell contends that "The effect of the poem, for all its horrors, is to rationalize and even to validate the war by implying that it somehow recovers many of the motifs and values of medieval chivalric romance". Dilworth, however, argues against Fussell's interpretation, stating the important battles that Jones alludes to - most of them Celtic defeats - are symbolically contained in the archetypal calamities of Camlann and the fall of Troy. Dilworth argues that Jones's allusions to romance literature expresses the horror of modern war and the poignancy of the deaths of infantrymen; and contends that Jones intended to reinterpret the traditional depiction of war by, for example, revealing Shakespeare's Henry V as an incipient anti-war play.
