= Hilary Douglas Clark Pepler =

British writer (1878–1951)

Hilary Pepler TOSD
- Born: 1878; Eastbourne, Sussex, England
- Died: 1951 (aged 72–73)
- Education: Bootham School
- Occupations: Printer, writer and poet
- Known for: The Guild of St Joseph and St Dominic
- Spouse: Clare Whiteman (m. 1904)
- Children: 6, including Conrad

Hilary "Harry" Douglas Clark Pepler TOSD (1878–1951) was an English printer, writer and poet. He was an associate of both Eric Gill and G. K. Chesterton, working on publications in which they had an interest. He was also a founder with Gill and Desmond Chute in 1920 of a Catholic community of craftsmen at Ditchling, Sussex, called The Guild of St Joseph and St Dominic.

== Life ==
His background was Quaker. He was born at Eastbourne and educated at Bootham School. In the early 1900s, Pepler moved to Hammersmith, London with his wife Clare Whiteman. Pepler became deeply involved in the aesthetic of the Arts and Crafts Movement and the politics of Fabianism. He became friends with Edward Johnston and, during World War I, met Eric Gill through the Hampshire House Workshops. At that time, Pepler was a social worker for the London County Council, and organised the first London school meals service. Pepler and Gill were together mostly responsible for the Ditchling house magazine, The Game.

In 1915, Pepler moved to Ditchling, where Gill had set up a commune of religious artists and artisans. There, he founded St. Dominic's Press, with the intention of printing books “about crafts which machinery threatened with extinction.” It published, amongst other books, important editions for the Ulysses Bookshop in High Holborn, London, owned by Jacob Schwartz, to 1937. These included works of James Joyce (in fact pirate editions), but also George Bernard Shaw, John Drinkwater, Augustus John, Chesterton and John Collier.

He became a Catholic convert in 1916; and joined the Dominicans as a lay member in 1918. At that time, he changed his name to Hilary. Financial quarrels between Pepler and Gill may have led to Gill leaving the Ditchling group in 1924. Pepler was forced to leave the Guild in 1934.

After Chesterton's death in 1936, Pepler assisted Reginald Jebb, son-in-law of Hilaire Belloc, in running The Weekly Review, the successor distributist publication to G. K.'s Weekly. Stephen Dorril's Blackshirt: Sir Oswald Mosley and British Fascism (2006) mentions Pepler in passing, as a member of the British People's Party in 1945.

== Family ==
He married Clare Whiteman in 1904; they had three sons and three daughters. His son David Pepler married Betty Gill, daughter of Eric Gill. Pepler's son, Fr. Conrad Pepler, O.P., ran the Dominican conference centre at Spode House, Staffordshire, for many years, and founded Spode Music Week.

== Works ==
- The Care Committee. The Child & the Parent (1914)
- The Devil's Devices or, Control versus Service, with wood engravings by Eric Gill (1915)
- Justice and the Child (1915)
- Three Poems (St. Dominic's Press, 1918)
- Nisi Dominus (1919)
- Concerning Dragons, with wood engravings by Eric Gill (St. Dominic's Press, 1929)
- The Law the Lawyers Know About (Saint Dominic's Press, 1923)
- The Service for the Burial of the Dead according to the use of the Orthodox Greek Church in London. The Greek Text with a rendering in English (1922)
- In Petra. Being a Sequel to "Nisi Dominus" (Saint Dominic's Press, 1923)
- Libellus lapidum (1924) with David Jones
- Judas or the betrayal: a play in one act (St. Dominic's Press 1926)
- Pilate - A Passion Play (St Dominic's Press, 1928)
- Plays For Puppets (St. Dominic's Press, 1929)
- A Nativity Play: The Three Wise Men (1929)
- Le Boeuf et L'Ane et deux autres pieces pour marionettes (St. Dominic's Press 1930)
- St. George and the Dragon: A One Act Play (1932)
- Mimes Sacred & Profane (St. Dominic's Press, 1932)
- The Hand Press: An Essay Written and Printed by Hand for the Society of Typographic Arts, Chicago (1934)
- The Field Is Won (1935) play
- The Four Minstrels of Bremen and "The Two Robbers", being more Plays for Puppets (St. Dominic's Press)
- A Letter About Eric Gill (1950)

== See also ==
- Hilaire Belloc and G. K. Chesterton
