= Fussell =

Fussell is a surname. Notable people with the surname include:

- Aaron Fussell (1924–2014), American politician and educator
- Alexander Fussell (c. 1814–1881), English artist and illustrator
- Bartholomew Fussell (1794–1871), American abolitionist and early advocate of women's careers as physicians
- Betty Fussell (born 1927), American writer
- Charles Fussell (born 1938), American composer
- Charles Lewis Fussell, (1840–1909), American painter
- Chris Fussell (born 1976), American Major League Baseball pitcher
- Don Fussell, American computer scientist
- Edwin Sill Fussell (1922–2002), American writer
- Fred Fussell (1895–1966), American Major League Baseball pitcher
- Jacob Fussell (1819–1912), American manufacturer
- James Fussell IV (1748–1832), An iron magnate
- Paul Fussell (1924–2012), American cultural and literary historian
- Philip Fussell (born 1931), English cricketer
- Richard Fussell (born 1984), Welsh rugby union winger
- Sandy Fussell (born 1960), Australian author
- Susan Fussell (1832–1889), educator, nurse in the United States Civil War, and philanthropist
