= Edmund Blunden =

British poet, author and critic (1896–1974)

Edmund Blunden CBE MC
- Blunden, c. 1914
- Born: Edmund Charles Blunden; 1 November 1896; London, England
- Died: 20 January 1974 (aged 77); Long Melford, England
- Resting place: Holy Trinity Church, Long Melford
- Education: Christ's Hospital; Queen's College, Oxford
- Occupations: Poet, author
- Spouse(s): Mary Daines; Sylva Norman; Claire Margaret Poynting
- Partner: Aki Hayashi
- Children: seven
- Writing career
- Notable works: Poems 1913 and 1914; An Elegy and Other Poems; Cricket Country; Poems on Japan
- Notable awards: Military Cross; C.B.E.; the Queen's Gold Medal for Poetry

Edmund Charles Blunden (1 November 1896 – 20 January 1974) was an English poet, author, and critic. Like his friend Siegfried Sassoon, he wrote of his experiences in World War I in both verse and prose. For most of his career, Blunden was also a reviewer for English publications and an academic in Tokyo and later Hong Kong. He ended his career as Professor of Poetry at the University of Oxford. He was nominated for the Nobel Prize in Literature six times.

== Early years ==
Born in London, Blunden was the eldest of the nine children of Charles Edmund Blunden (1871–1951) and his wife, Georgina Margaret née Tyler, who were joint-headteachers of Yalding school. Blunden was educated at Christ's Hospital and The Queen's College, Oxford.

== World War I ==
In September 1915, over a year after the outbreak of World War I, Blunden was commissioned as a temporary second lieutenant into the British Army's Royal Sussex Regiment. He was posted to the 11th (Service) Battalion (1st South Down), Royal Sussex Regiment, a Kitchener's Army unit that formed part of the 116th Brigade of the 39th Division in May 1916, two months after the battalion's arrival in France. He served with the battalion on the Western Front to the end of the war, taking part in the actions at Ypres and the Somme, followed in 1917 by the Battle of Passchendaele. In January 1917, and by now a temporary lieutenant (having been promoted to that rank in September 1916), he was awarded the Military Cross (MC), the citation for which reads:

For conspicuous gallantry in action. He displayed great courage and determination when in charge of a carrying party under heavy fire. He has previously done fine work.

Blunden survived nearly two years in the front line without physical injury (despite being gassed in October 1917), but for the rest of his life, he bore mental scars from his experiences. With characteristic self-deprecation, he attributed his survival to his diminutive size, which made "an inconspicuous target". His own account of his experiences was published in 1928, as Undertones of War.

== University ==
Blunden left the army in 1919 and took up the scholarship at Oxford that he had won while he was still at school. On the same English literature course was Robert Graves, and the two were close friends during their time at Oxford together, but Blunden found university life unsatisfactory and left in 1920 to take up a literary career, at first acting as assistant to Middleton Murry on the Athenaeum.

== Writer ==
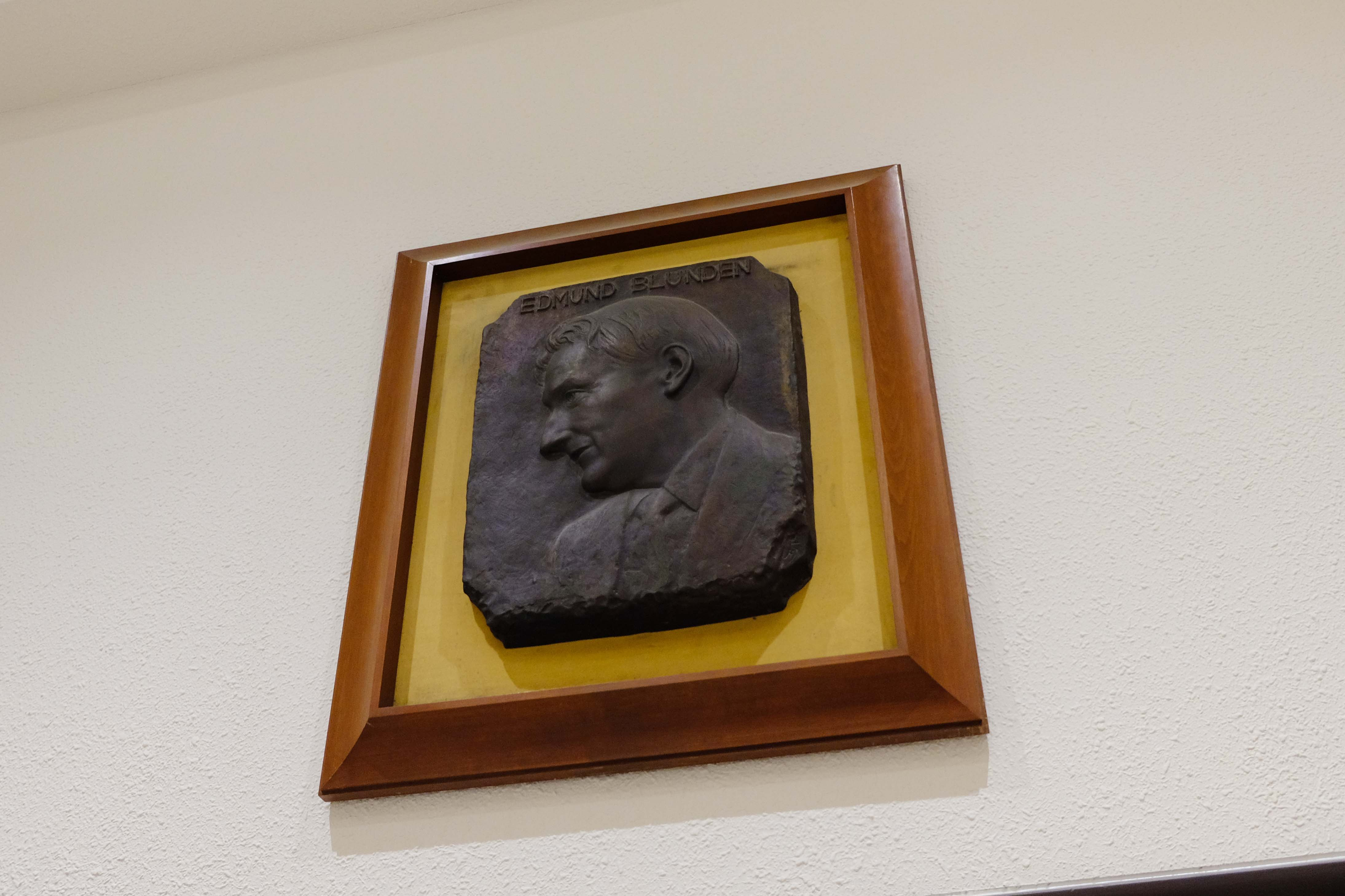
Relief commemorating Blunden's contribution to the University of Tokyo Library displayed at the library

An early supporter was Siegfried Sassoon, who became a lifelong friend. In 1920, Blunden published a collection of poems, The Waggoner, and with Alan Porter, he edited the poems of John Clare (mostly from Clare's manuscript).

Blunden's next book of poems, The Shepherd, published in 1922, won the Hawthornden Prize, but his poetry, though well reviewed, did not provide enough to live on. In 1924, he accepted the post of lecturer of English at the University of Tokyo. In December 1925, he dedicated a poem « UP!UP! » to the rugby men of the University and this became the anthem of the Tokyo University RFC. He returned to England in 1927, and was literary editor of the Nation for a year. In 1927, he published a short book, On the Poems of Henry Vaughan, Characteristics and Intimations, with his principal Latin poems carefully translated into English verse (London: H. Cobden-Sanderson, 1927), expanding and revising an essay that he had published, in November 1926, in the London Mercury. In 1931, he returned to Oxford as a Fellow of Merton College, where he was highly regarded as a tutor. During his years in Oxford, Blunden published extensively: several collections of poetry including Choice or Chance (1934) and Shells by a Stream (1944), prose works on Charles Lamb; Edward Gibbon; Leigh Hunt; Percy Bysshe Shelley (Shelley: A Life Story); John Taylor; and Thomas Hardy; and a book about a game he loved, Cricket Country (1944). He returned to full-time writing in 1944, becoming assistant editor of The Times Literary Supplement. In 1947, he returned to Japan as a member of the British liaison mission in Tokyo. In 1953 after three years back in England, he accepted the post of Professor of English Literature at the University of Hong Kong.

== Later life ==
Blunden retired in 1964 and settled in Suffolk. In 1966, he was nominated for the Oxford Professorship of Poetry in succession to Graves; with some misgivings, he agreed to stand and was elected by a large majority over the other candidate, Robert Lowell. However, he now found the strain of public lecturing too much for him, and after two years, he resigned.

He died of a heart attack at his home at Long Melford, Suffolk, in 1974, and is buried in the churchyard of Holy Trinity Church, Long Melford.

== Personal life ==
Blunden was married three times. While still in the army, he met and married Mary Daines in 1918. They had three children, the first of whom died in infancy. They divorced in 1931, and in 1933, Blunden married Sylva Norman, a young novelist and critic. That marriage, which was childless, was dissolved in 1945. The same year, he married Claire Margaret Poynting (1918–2000), a college room-mate of his daughter Mary Clare from his first marriage. Together, they had four daughters, who included Margaret, Lucy, and Frances. While in Japan in the summer of 1925, he met Aki Hayashi, and he began a relationship. When Blunden returned to England in 1927, Aki accompanied him and would become his secretary. The relationship later changed from a romantic one to a platonic friendship, and they remained in contact for the rest of her life.

Blunden's love of cricket, celebrated in his book Cricket Country, is described by the biographer Philip Ziegler as fanatical. Blunden and his friend Rupert Hart-Davis regularly opened the batting for a publisher's eleven in the 1930s (Blunden insisted on batting without gloves). An affectionate obituary tribute in The Guardian commented, "He loved cricket… and played it ardently and very badly", and in a review of Cricket Country, George Orwell described him as "the true cricketer":

The test of a true cricketer is that he shall prefer village cricket to 'good' cricket [.... Blunden's] friendliest memories are of the informal village game, where everyone plays in braces, where the blacksmith is liable to be called away in mid-innings on an urgent job, and sometimes, about the time when the light begins to fail, a ball driven for four kills a rabbit on the boundary.

In a 2009 appreciation of the book and its author, Bangalore writer Suresh Menon wrote:

Any cricket book that talks easily of Henry James and Siegfried Sassoon and Ranji and Grace and Richard Burton (the writer, not the actor) and Coleridge is bound to have a special charm of its own. As Blunden says, "The game which made me write at all, is not terminated at the boundary, but is reflected beyond, is echoed and varied out there among the gardens and the barns, the dells and the thickets, and belongs to some wider field."

Perhaps that is what all books on cricket are trying to say.

Blunden had a robust sense of humour. In Hong Kong, he relished linguistic misunderstandings such as those of the restaurant that offered "fried prawn's balls" and the schoolboy who wrote, "In Hong Kong there is a queer at every bus-stop".

His fellow poets' regard for Blunden was illustrated by the contributions to a dinner in his honour for which poems were specially written by Cecil Day-Lewis and William Plomer; T. S. Eliot and Walter de la Mare were guests; and Sassoon provided the Burgundy.

== Honours ==
Blunden's public honours included the CBE, 1951; the Queen's gold medal for Poetry, 1956; the Royal Society of Literature's Benson Medal; the Order of the Rising Sun, 3rd Class (Japan), 1963; and honorary Membership of the Japan Academy.

On 11 November 1985, Blunden was among 16 Great War poets commemorated on a slate stone unveiled in Poets' Corner in Westminster Abbey. The inscription on the stone was taken from Wilfred Owen's "Preface" to his poems and reads: "My subject is War, and the pity of War. The Poetry is in the pity."

== Works ==
Blunden's output was prolific, and he is one of the writers most quoted in The Great War and Modern Memory, Paul Fussell's classic 1975 work on the literature of World War I.

To those who thought that he published too much, he quoted Walter de la Mare's observation that time was the poet's best editor.

Poetry

- Poems 1913 and 1914 (1914);
- Poems Translated from the French (1914);
- Three Poems (1916);
- The Barn (1916);
- The Silver Bird of Herndyke Mill; Stane Street; The Gods of the World Beneath (1916);
- The Harbingers (1916);
- Pastorals (1916);
- The Waggoner and Other Poems (1920);
- The Shepherd, and Other Poems of Peace and War (1922);
- Old Homes (1922);
- To Nature: New Poems (1923);
- Dead Letters (1923);
- Masks of Time: A New Collection of Poems Principally Meditative (1925);
- Japanese Garland (1928);
- Retreat (1928);
- Winter Nights: A Reminiscence (1928);
- Near and Far: New Poems (1929);
- A Summer's Fancy (1930);
- To Themis: Poems on Famous Trials (1931);
- In Summer (1931);
- Constantia and Francis: An Autumn Evening (1931);
- Halfway House: A Miscellany of New Poems (1932);
- Choice or Chance: New Poems (1934);
- Verses: To H.R.H. The Duke of Windsor (1936);
- An Elegy and Other Poems (1937);
- On Several Occasions (1938);
- Poems, 1930–1940 (1940);
- Shells by a Stream (1944);
- After the Bombing, and Other Short Poems (1949);
- Eastward: A Selection of Verses Original and Translated (1950);
- Records of Friendship (1950);
- Poems of Many Years (1957);
- A Hong Kong House (1959);
- Poems on Japan (1967).

Biographical books on romantic figures:

- Leigh Hunt's 'Examiner' Examined (1928);
- Leigh Hunt. A Biography (1930);
- Charles Lamb and his Contemporaries (1933);
- Edward Gibbon and his Age (1935);
- Keats's Publisher. A Memoir (1936);
- Thomas Hardy (1941);
- Shelley. A Life Story (1946) with strong evidence on pp. 278 and 290 that Shelley was murdered.

Memoir:

- Undertones of War (1928).

Artists Rifles, an audiobook CD published in 2004, includes a reading of Concert Party, Busseboom by Blunden himself, recorded in 1964 by the British Council. Other World War I poets heard on the CD include Siegfried Sassoon, Edgell Rickword, Graves, David Jones, and Lawrence Binyon. Blunden can also be heard on Memorial Tablet, an audiobook of readings by Sassoon issued in 2003.

== Gallery ==
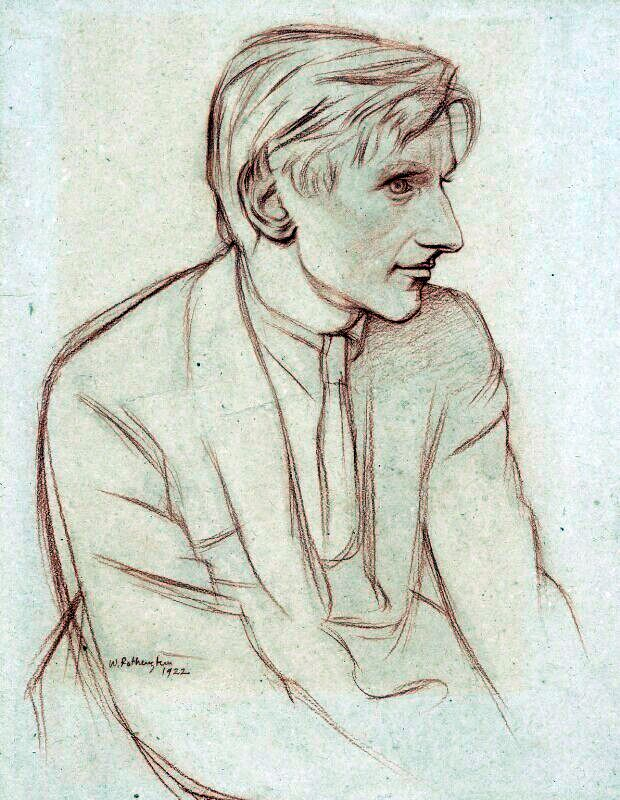
Edmund Blunden by William Rothenstein, chalk, 1922

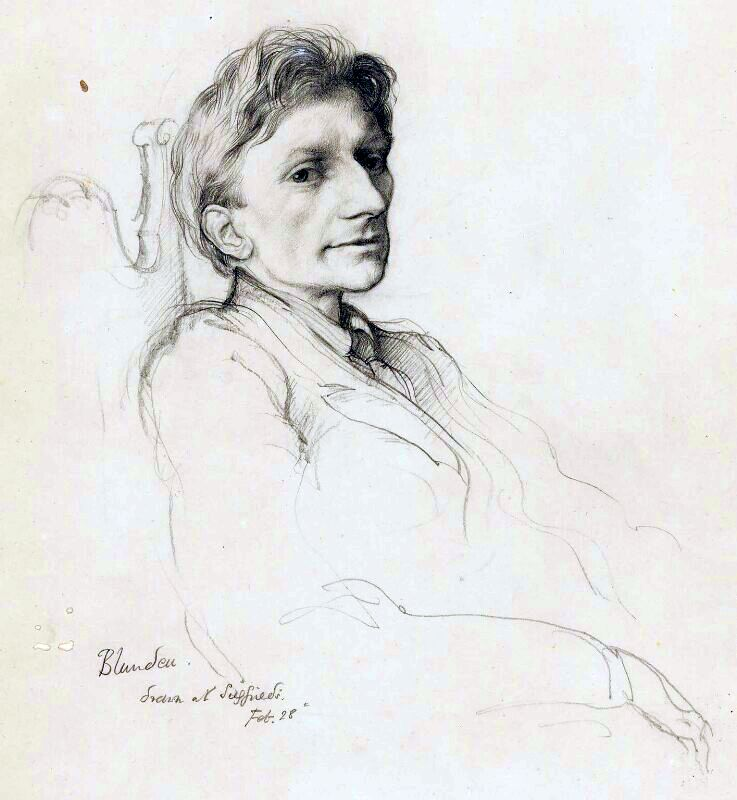
Edmund Blunden by Rex Whistler, pencil, 1929

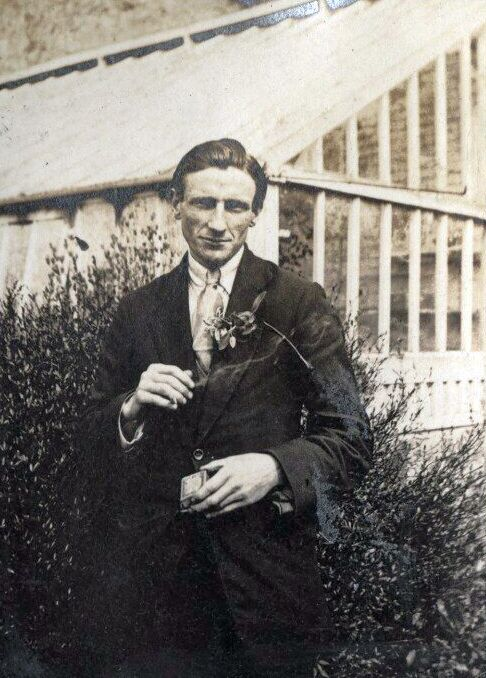
Edmund Blunden by Lady Ottoline Morrell, vintage snapshot print, 1920

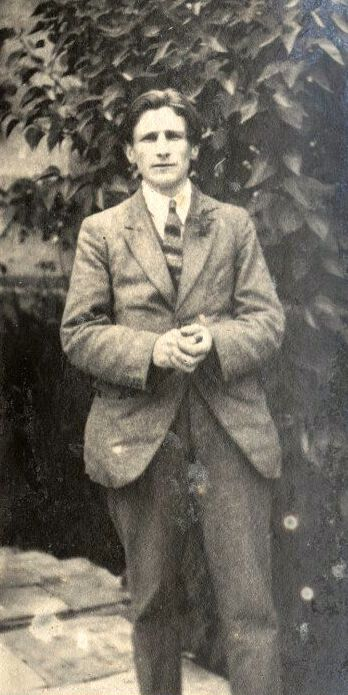
Edmund Blunden by Lady Ottoline Morrell, vintage snapshot print, 1923

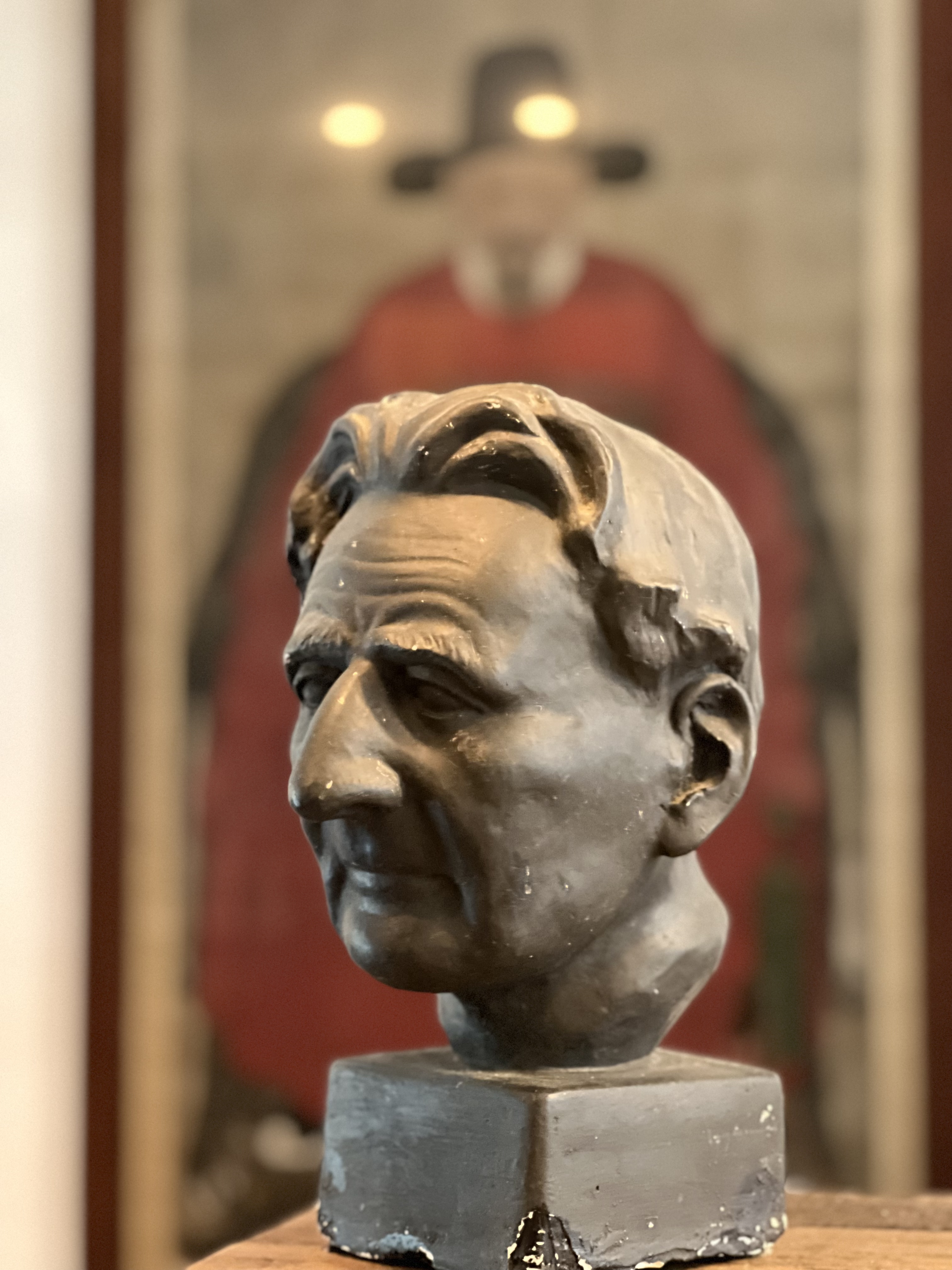
Plaster bust of Edmund Blunden by KY Wong, early 1960s now at Merton College Library

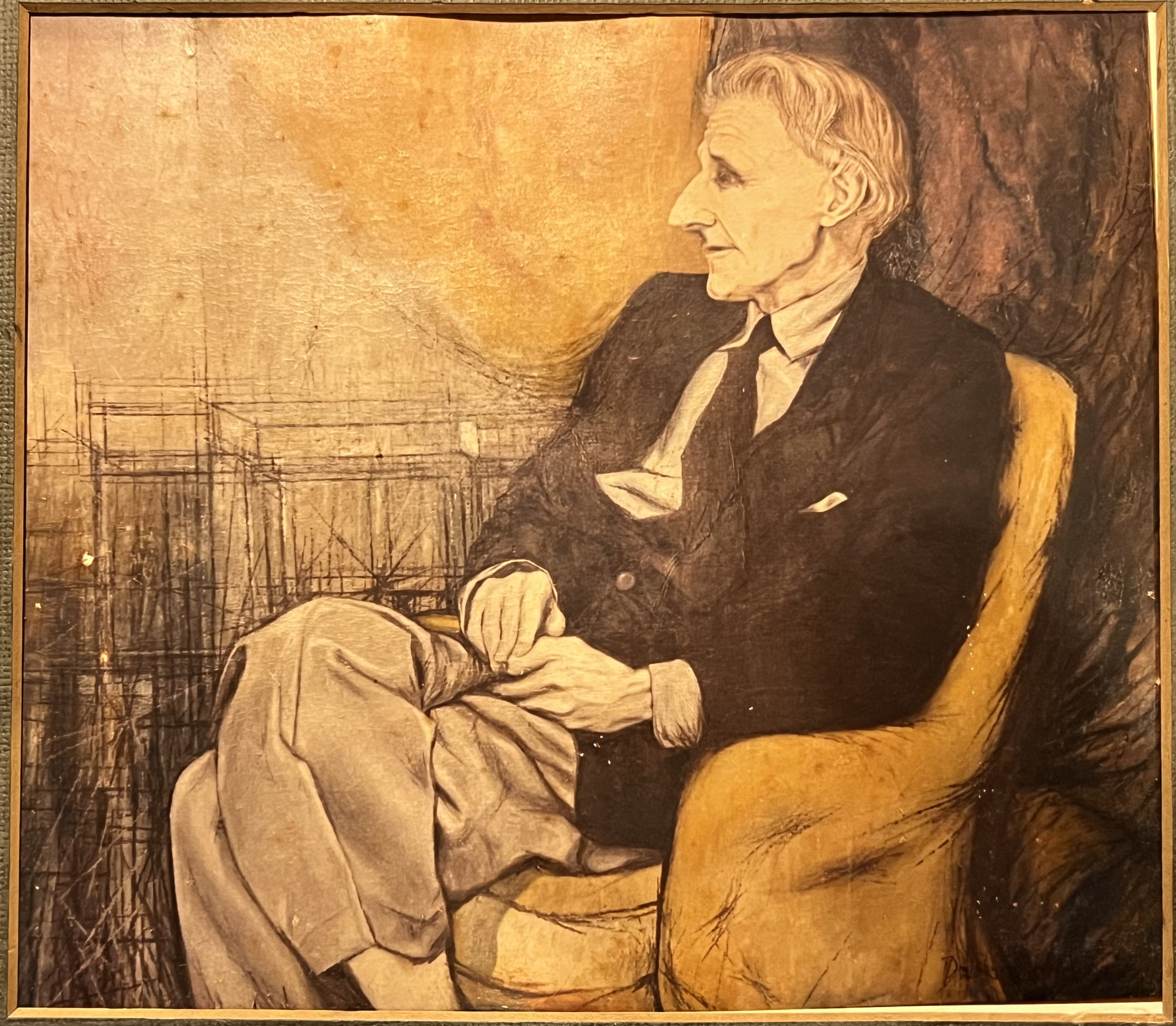
Blunden portrait by Douglas Bland held in HKU archives
