= Undertones of War =

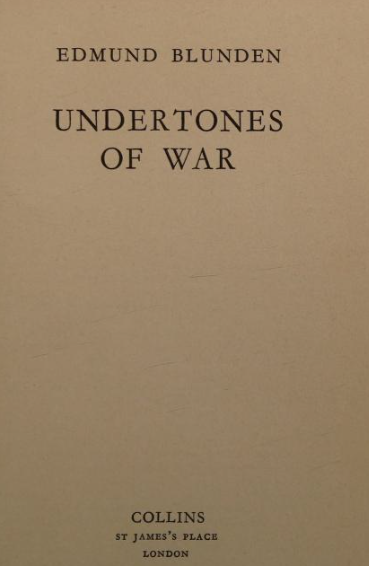
- Title page for Undertones of War (1928)
- Author: Edmund Blunden
- Language: English
- Genre: Memoir
- Publisher: R. Cobden-Sanderson
- Publication date: 1928
- Publication place: United Kingdom

Undertones of War is a 1928 memoir of the First World War, written by English poet Edmund Blunden. As with two other famous war memoirs—Siegfried Sassoon's Sherston trilogy, and Robert Graves' Good-Bye to All That—Undertones represents Blunden's first prose publication, and was one of the earliest contributors to the flurry of Great War books to come out of England in the late 1920s and early 1930s.

== Synopsis ==
Paul Fussell has called Undertones of War an "extended elegy in prose," and critics have commented on its lack of central narrative. Like Henri Barbusse's Under Fire and Erich Maria Remarque's All Quiet on the Western Front, the text presents a series of war-related episodes rather than a distinct, teleological narrative.

== Reviews ==
According to Paul Fussell, in Blunden's “writing about horror and violence, understatement delivers the point more effectively than either idealism or heavy emphasis.” G.S. Fraser, meanwhile, has called the text "the best war poem," despite its prose form, and went so far as to print sections as poetry in the London Magazine.
