= Poetic Meter and Poetic Form =

1965 book by Paul Fussell

- Revised edition (1979)
- Author: Paul Fussell
- Language: English
- Publisher: McGraw Hill
- Publication date: 1965
- ISBN: 0-07-553606-4

Poetic Meter and Poetic Form is a book by Paul Fussell, published by McGraw Hill in 1965, and later as a revised edition in 1979 (ISBN 0-07-553606-4).

Fussell distinguishes four types of meter:

1. Syllabic
2. Accentual
3. Accentual-syllabic
4. Quantitative

== Notes ==
1. page 6.
