= Aircraft artillery =

Class of artillery mounted on aircraft

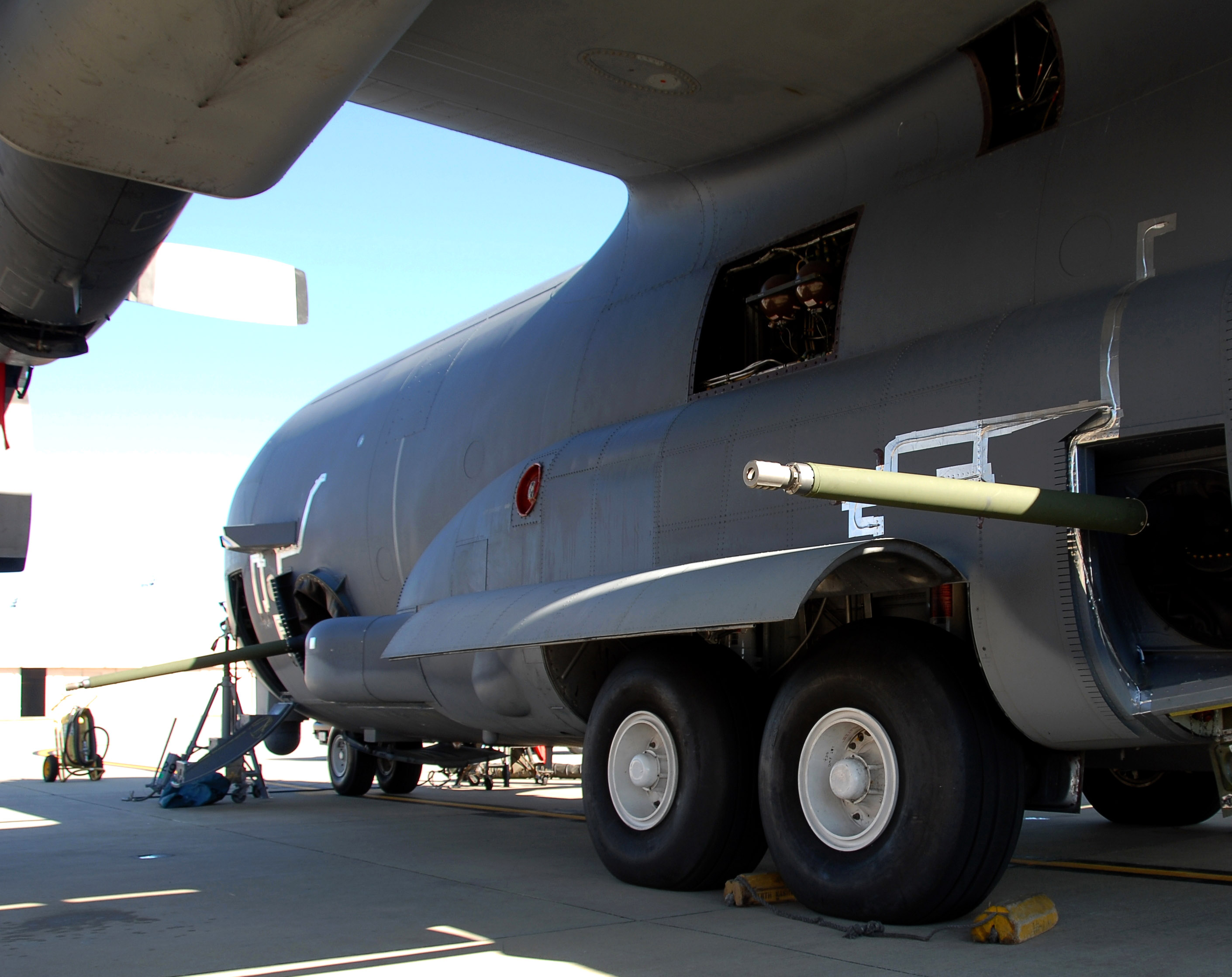
30 mm Bushmaster Chain Guns

Aircraft artillery are artillery weapons with a 30 mm caliber or larger that is mounted on aircraft. First used for ground attack roles during World War I, aircraft artillery has found its use in the present day, most notably on the AC-130.

== History ==
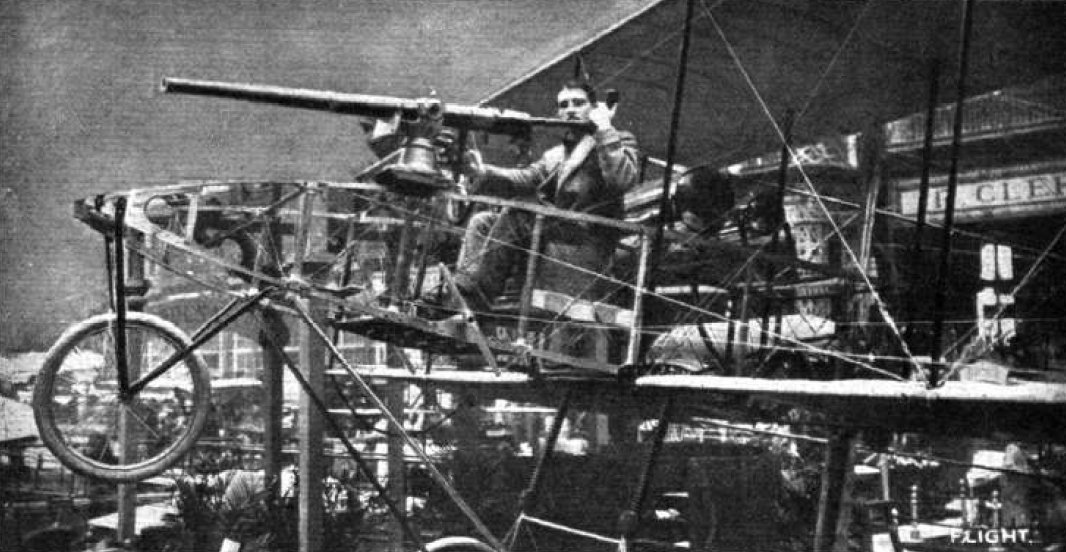

Aircraft artillery was first used for ground attack roles during World War I. A notable user of aircraft artillery was the fighter ace René Fonck. Airships were used with some success, mostly used to harass cities, but after the development of incendiary ammunition they were stopped being used due to the fire igniting the hydrogen used for the Zeppelins.

During World War 2 multiple planes used large calibre cannons for:

Destruction of armoured vehicles (Yak 9T and Junkers Ju 87 G)

Destruction of small bunkers

Destruction of ships (P108 A)

Close Air Support: (IL-2 Sturmovnik)

During the Cold War very high calibre cannons were being slowly replaced by Air to ground missiles and laser guided bombs. Current use of large calibre cannons found itself in gunships, (AC-130) due to the larger size more weaponry is able to be mounted.

== Notable aircraft using artillery ==
- Beardmore W.B.V
- Blackburn Perth
- de Havilland Mosquito FB Mk. XVIII
- Henschel Hs 129 B-2 - Rüstsätze 2 or Rüstsätze 4
- Henschel Hs 129 B-3
- Junkers Ju 87 G
- Junkers Ju 88 P
- Lockheed AC-130
- Messerschmitt Me 262 A-1/U4
- Mitsubishi Ki-109
- North American B-25G Mitchell
- North American B-25H Mitchell
- Salmson-Moineau
- SPAD S.XII
- Voisin III, world's first aircraft using artillery.

== See also ==
- Gunship
- List of aircraft artillery
