= Bartholomew Fussell =

American physician and abolitionist (1794–1871)

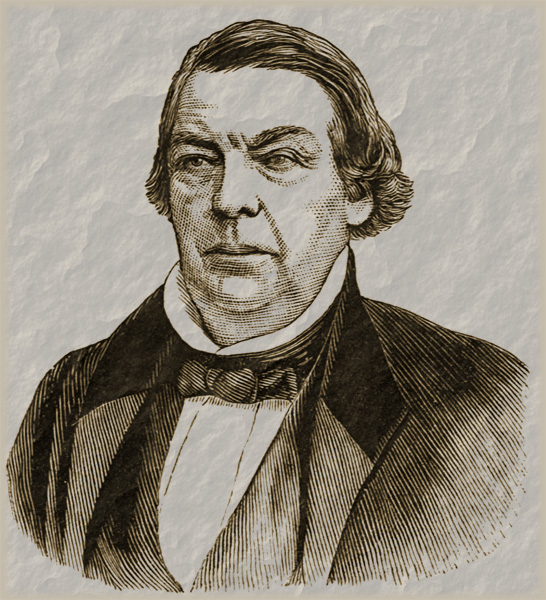
- Bartholomew Fussell courtesy of US History Images
- Born: January 9, 1794; Chester County, Pennsylvania, U.S.
- Died: January 14, 1871 (aged 77); Chester County, Pennsylvania, U.S.
- Occupation: Physician
- Known for: Participant in the Underground Railroad; Advocate for women's careers in medicine
- Spouses: Lydia Morris (m. 1826; died 1840) Rebecca Churchman Hewes (m. 1841)
- Children: 6, including Susan Fussell

Bartholomew Fussell (1794–1871) was an American abolitionist who participated in the Underground Railroad by providing refuge for fugitive slaves at his safe house in Kennett Square, Pennsylvania, and other locations in Pennsylvania and Ohio. He aided an estimated 2000 slaves in escaping from bondage. He was a founding member of the American Anti-Slavery Society. Fussell was an advocate for women serving as physicians, and he influenced the founding of the Women's Medical College of Pennsylvania. He worked as a practicing physician, including providing medical services for fugitive slaves.

== Early life and education ==
Fussell was born to a Quaker family in Chester County, Pennsylvania, to Rebecca (née Bond) and Bartholomew Fussell. His father and his sister Esther strongly encouraged Fussell's pursuit of higher education. He moved to Maryland as a young man where he perceived he had better educational opportunities. There, he opened a school in Little Falls, Maryland, and taught. At night, he studied medicine, eventually graduating as a physician from the Medical College of Baltimore. He also opened a Sunday school in Bush River Neck, Maryland, for African-American slaves, teaching them to read the Bible. This was a controversial practice at the time. During this time, he became involved through family ties with Quaker members of the local abolitionist movement, especially Elisha Tyson. Fussell himself began to speak out against the institution of slavery, for which he was criticized by local slaveholders.

== Personal life and family ==
After completing his education, Fussell returned to Chester County, Pennsylvania, where he established a medical practice. Shortly thereafter, on May 26, 1826, he married Lydia Morris and established a home in Kennett Square, Pennsylvania, that came to be known as "The Pines" and was used as a safe house for the Underground Railroad. He purchased The Pines from Jonathan and Ann Thomas who were already active in the Underground Railroad, having used the home as a refuge for runaway slaves from 1805 to 1830.

Susan Fussell was a daughter of Bartholomew Fussell and Lydia Morris. She was notable as an educator, nurse in the United States Civil War, and a philanthropist. As a young woman, she was woman of the house at a young age following the early death of her mother.

Fussell's wife Lydia died in 1840. On September 2, 1841, he married Rebecca Churchman Hewes, with whom he had one child Edward Churchman Fussell.

== Participation in the Underground Railroad ==
In Pennsylvania, Fussell developed a working relationship with local abolitionist Thomas Garrett. At that time, Fussell began sheltering fugitive slaves brought to his home from prior refuge with Garrett. Besides sheltering, he used his home, The Pines, to provide medical services to sick or injured runaway slaves. His home was approximately 1 mile east of the historical village of Kennett Square, which was a center point of the abolitionist movement in southeast Pennsylvania. The Pines had a root cellar that was used as a hiding place for runaway slaves, and it also had a second exit for rapid escape. Fussell and his wife Lydia frequently hosted other abolitionists at The Pines.

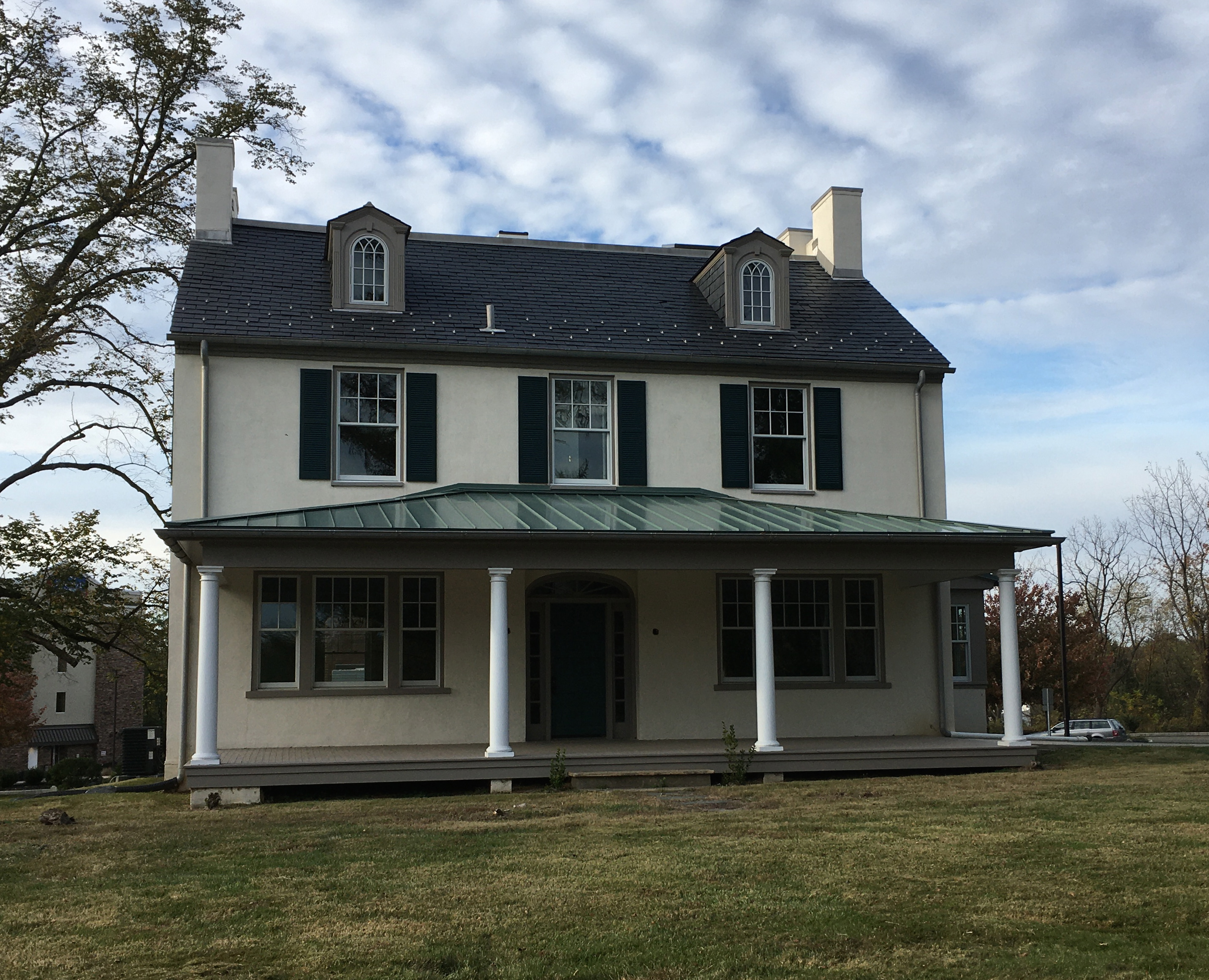
The Pines, as seen in 2019

In 1833, Fussell was an original signer of the Declaration of Sentiments of the American Anti-Slavery Society, a manifesto that stated anti-slavery principles of the organization. The signing occurred at the first meeting of this organization, which was held in Philadelphia, Pennsylvania.

In the late 1830s, Fussell moved approximately 20 miles north of Kennett Square to West Vincent, Pennsylvania, to a farm neighboring his sister Ester Lewis. At that location, he collaborated with Lewis, her daughters, in addition to Garrett and abolitionists John Vickers and Elijah Pennypacker in furthering the work of the Underground Railroad.

In 1841, Fussell and his new wife moved to York, Pennsylvania. At that time, his brother and nephew moved into the Fussell home in West Vincent to continue the work on the Underground Railroad at the Fussell and Lewis homes.

Activities of the Underground Railroad increased after the 1850 passage of the Fugitive Slave Law, which increased penalties for aiding fugitive slaves. Fussell, in turn, increased his own participation. In 1851, he aided the escape of three participants in the Christiana Riot, providing the escapees with refuge in the Lewis family home in Chester County. Fussell remained an active member of the Pennsylvania Anti-Slavery Society up until the end of the United States Civil War.

As a safe house operator, he is an example of a conductor and of a stationmaster in the Underground Railroad, railroad terminology often being used in this context.

Fussell's involvement in the Underground Railroad is documented in an early treatise on the subject, The Underground Railroad Records, by African-American abolitionist William Still, in 1872. Fussell's home, The Pines, was purchased by Kennett Township in 2016 for historic preservation.

== Influence on careers for women as physicians ==
Fussell recognized the limited opportunities that women of his time faced in the field of medicine because of his sister Ester's stymied efforts to pursue a career in medicine. In 1840, Fussell began classes to teach women the basics of medicine. He subsequently began a campaign to advance the cause of women as physicians. In 1846, Fussell organized a meeting of five local physicians and his niece Graceanna Lewis to discuss the desirability of women's careers in medicine. Attendees included the five other physicians: Dr. Ezra Mitchener, Dr.Edwin Fussell (the husband of Graceanna's sister, Rebecca Lewis; nephew of Dr. Bartholomew Fussell), Dr, Franklin Taylor, Dr. Ellwood Harvey, and Dr. Sylvester Birdsall, in addition to Fussell's niece. This meeting eventually led to the founding of the Female Medical College of Pennsylvania (later changed to Women's in 1867) in 1850, although he did not play a direct role in its creation.

== Later years and death ==
After the American Civil War and the abolition of slavery, Fussell spent much of his time in Pendleton, Indiana, at the home of his son Joshua Fussell. However, he died in West Pikeland Township, Pennsylvania, at the home of his son Dr. Morris Fussell. Fussell is buried alongside his wife Lydia at the Pikeland Friends Burial Ground in Phoenixville, Pennsylvania.

== External links and further reading ==
- The Fussell House
- Declaration of Sentiments of the American Anti-Slavery Society
- Smedley, Robert Clemens. History of the Underground Railroad in Chester and the Neighboring Counties of Pennsylvania. Office of the Journal, 1883. Print.
