= Sandy Fussell =

Australian author (born 1960)

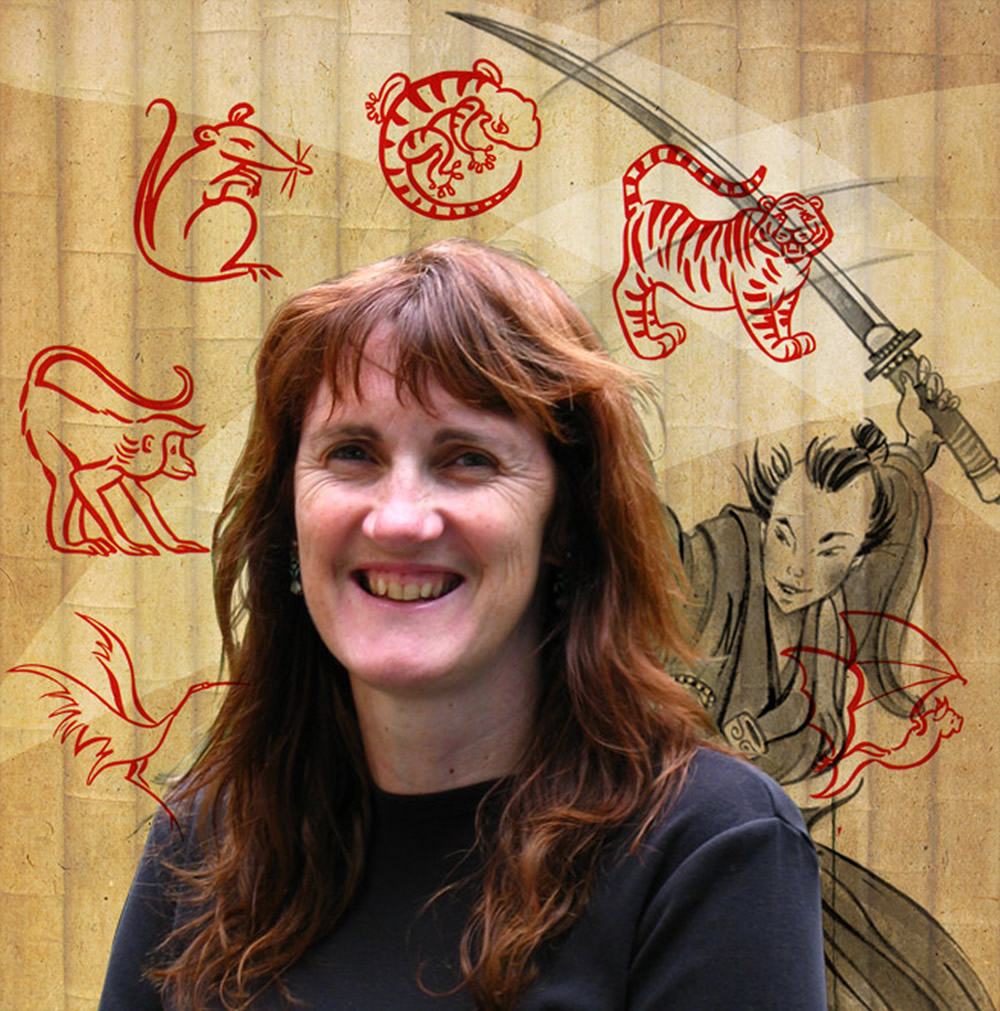
- Born: 1960 (age 65–66); Camden, NSW, Australia
- Occupation: Author
- Writing career
- Genre: Children's Literature
- Website: www.sandyfussell.com

Sandy Fussell (born in 1960) is an Australian author best known for her works in children’s literature. Her second novel, Polar Boy, was selected as the National Reading Day book for primary school students in 2009.

== Biography ==
Fussell began writing as a mother-son writing project when one of her children had stopped reading. The project was eventually abandoned when she was told to "go write your own book".

Fussell works as a computer programmer and is passionate about using technology to encourage children to read and write. Her website, Samurai Kids, has been archived by the National Library of Australia's PANDORA Project, which provides long-term access to Australian online publications.

== Published works ==
=== Samurai Kids series ===
- White Crane (2008) (ISBN 9781921150388)
- Owl Ninja (2008) (ISBN 9780763657727)
- Shaolin Tiger (2009) (ISBN 9781455845477)
- Monkey Fist (2009) (ISBN 9781451749656)
- Fire Lizard (2010) (ISBN 9781921529467)
- Golden Bat (2011) (ISBN 9781921529474)
- Red Fox (2012) (ISBN 9781922077509)
- Black Tengu (2013) (ISBN 9781922077622)

=== Others ===
- Ratbags (2008) (ISBN 9781842851531)
- Polar Boy (2008) (ISBN 9781921150388)
- Jaguar Warrior (2010) (ISBN 9781921529290)
- Sad the Dog (2015) (ISBN 9781925381511)

== Awards ==
- 2009 Short-Listed CBCA Children's Book of the Year, Polar Boy
- 2009 Honour Book CBCA Junior Judges Project, Polar Boy
- 2009 Short-Listed Sakura Medal Chapter Book (Japan), Samurai Kids Book 1 - White Crane
- 2009 Panda Book Award Middle Readers (China), Polar Boy
- 2010 CBCA Notable, Samurai Kids Book 3 - Shaolin Tiger
- 2010 Shortlist Speech Pathology Book of the Year, Samurai Kids Book 3 - Shaolin Tiger
