= Susan Fussell =

Susan Fussell (1832-1889) was an American educator, army nurse and philanthropist.

== Early life and education ==
Susan Fussell was born in Kennett Square, Pennsylvania, April 7, 1832. Her parents were Dr. Bartholomew and Lydia Morris Fussell, both of old Quaker families, and both in advance of their time in intelligence and ideas. Bartholomew was the founder of the first medical college for women in the United States.

Susan became the woman of the house in her early years, as her mother died when she was only a child. The death of the mother broke up the home circle.

== Career ==
At the age of 15, she began to teach school, and from that time, she was her own supporter.

=== American Civil War ===
In 1861, her oldest brother, then living in Fall Creek, Indiana, entered the Union Army as a volunteer, and she offered her companionship in his home so long as her brother should be absent. She was thus introduced to western life, resuming her occupation as a teacher and continuing until 1862. By that time, the American Civil War had grown to vast proportions. A call came for more nurses for the army hospitals in the South, and Susan Fussell at once volunteered. She started south in April 1862, and under the auspices of the Indiana Sanitary Committee, she went to their station in Memphis, Tennessee. The nature of her work there included 120 patients under her personal care; that for 60 of these, she was to see that a special diet was prepared; that in addition, she had the giving out of the food to be prepared for all, with a personal supervision of all the medicines and stimulants administered. In Memphis, eight hospitals had been fitted up preparatory to the siege of Vicksburg. Her brother, under General Ulysses S. Grant, had charge of the engineering operations of that siege, and until Vicksburg had fallen. Fussell remained at her post in Memphis, a period of eight months. A much needed rest of five, weeks followed, and then she was sent to Louisville, Kentucky. She labored in other hospitals in Tennessee and in Jeffersonville, Indiana. She became sick, and her brother removed her to Fall Creek. Restored to health, she again entered the service and remained until the war ended.

=== Soldiers' orphans' homes ===
At the close of the war, she returned to Philadelphia, but learning soon that an effort was being made to induce the State of Indiana to provide a home for the soldiers' orphans, she again offered her services in any useful capacity in that work.

George Merritt, of Indianapolis, Indiana, who had been most urgent in calling the attention of the officers of the State to their duty in that matter, finding that there was no hope, offered to furnish Fussell with the money necessary to clothe, rear, educate and care for a family of ten orphans of soldiers, and bring them up to maturity, if she would furnish the motherly love, the years of hard labor and self-sacrifice, the sleepless nights and endless patience needed for the work. After a few days of prayerful consideration she accepted, and in the fall of 1865 ten orphans were gathered together in Indianapolis from various parts of the State from among those who had no friends able or willing to care for them. In the spring of 1866 they were removed to the Soldiers' Home near Knightstown, Indiana, where a small cottage and garden were assigned to their use. In 1875, she placed the older boys in houses where their growing strength could be better utilized, and moved with the girls and younger boys to Spiceland to secure the benefit of better schools. In 1877, all of the ten but one were self-supporting, and have since taken useful and respectable positions in society. The one exception was a little feeble-minded boy, who, with his brother, had been found in the county poor-house; his condition and wants very soon impressed her with the necessity for a State home for feeble-minded children in Indiana, it having been found necessary to send this boy to another State to be educated. He was placed in a neighboring State institution, and was almost self-supporting.

=== Knightstown Home for the Feeble-Minded ===
With her usual energy and directness, she went to work to gather statistics on the subject of "Feeble-minded Children " in this and other States, and to interest others in their welfare. She at last found an active co-worker in Charles Hubbard, the representative from Henry county in the legislature, and their united efforts, aided by other friends of the cause, secured in 1876 the enactment of the law establishing the Home for Feeble-minded Children, put into operation near Knightstown, Indiana.

=== Orphans' home ===
A legacy bequeathed to Fussell by a relative of her mother greatly widened her opportunities for doing good. She secured a sufficient number of acres of and to supply a large home. During the first year of her residence in Spiceland, Fussell, impressed with the importance of good, pure home influences in rearing children to be honest, useful men and women, applied to the county commissioners for the pauper children of Henry County. Her request was for a long time held under consideration. Pending the decision, she determined to secure the establishment of a school in which feeble-minded children might be taught. To gain that end, she promised to secure the needed statistics, if the representative in the Indiana State legislature would present the bill. She fulfilled her promise, and under the care of Charles Hubbard, the bill was secured, and the Knightstown Home for the Feeble-Minded became the monument of her work. After two years, the county commissioners of Henry County agreed to permit Fussell to take the children from the almshouse, provided she would furnish a home and board, clothe, nurse and educate them for US$0.23 per day. So earnest was she to secure for the experiment a fair trial, that she consented to the unjust and ungenerous terms. The men of the county would not long endure this, and the sum was speedily raised to $0.25, and finally to $0.30. Thus was begun the home for the unfortunate children in Spiceland. Its success was assured, and other homes of a similar character throughout the State were largely due to the influence of Fussell.

The result of her work was the passage of a law by the legislature of 1880–1881, giving to county commissioners the right to place their destitute children under the care of a matron, giving her sole charge of them and full credit for her work, and providing for her salary and their support. Under that law, Fussell had all the destitute children of Henry county under her care, creating a model orphans' home. Thus has this one woman been a power for good, and by following in the direct line of her duty, influenced legislation.

== Personal life ==
Fussell died in Spiceland, in 1889. She had been elected an honorary member of one of the Posts of the Grand Army of the Republic, and six of the members were chosen as her pallbearers. She was interred in the Friends' Burial Ground, in Fall Creek. She was a member of the Friends' Society and always valued her right of membership.
