= List of aircraft artillery =

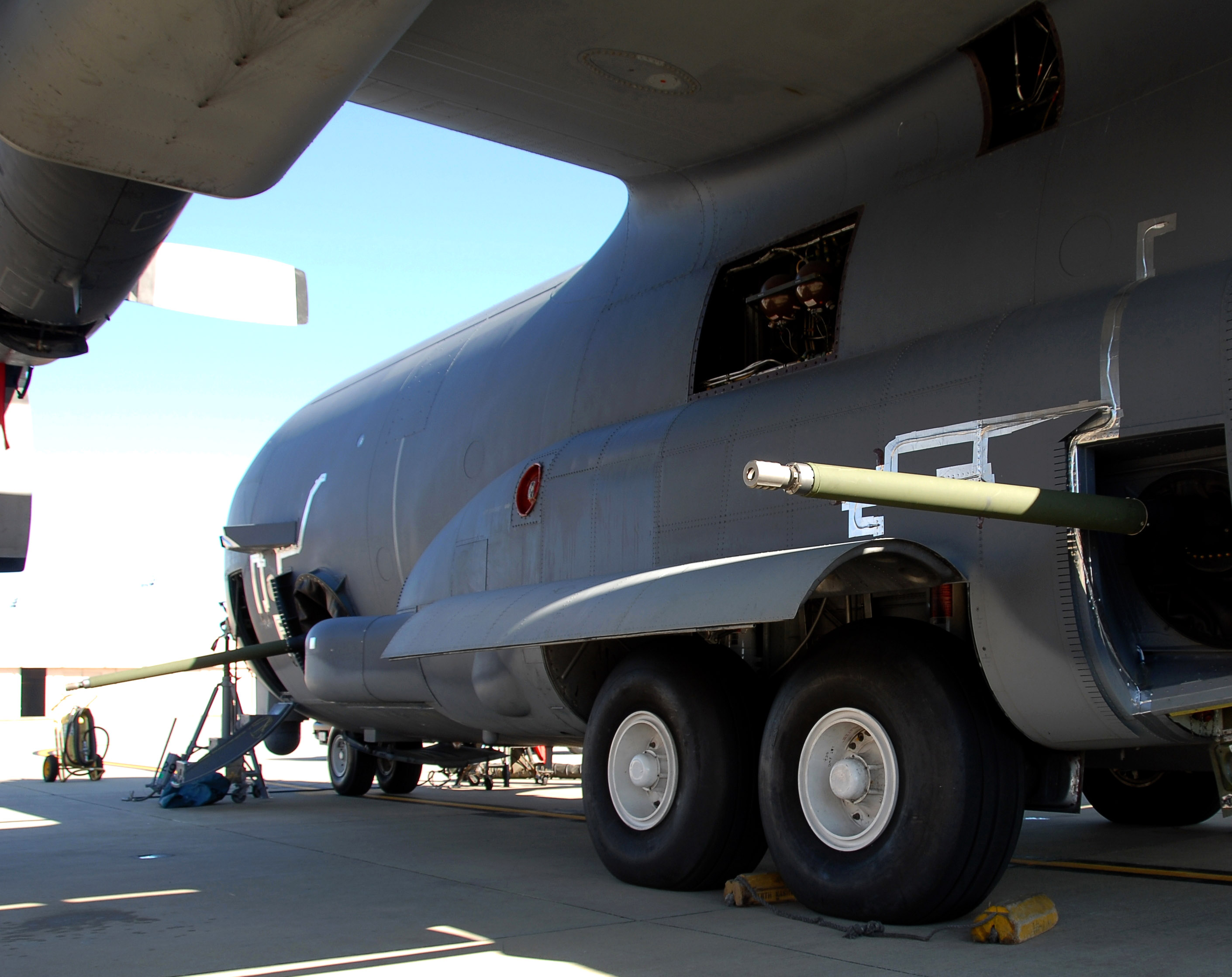
Aircraft artillery has been in use since the first world war. One of the most notable aircraft artillery platforms is the AC130.

List of artillery platforms used on aircraft with a calibre larger than 37mm.

== A ==
- 102mm Ansaldo 1941
- 76.2mm APK Recoilless Rifle

== B ==
- 50mm BK 5 Cannon
- Bofors 40 mm

== H ==
- 57mm Ho-401 Cannon

== M ==
- M102 howitzer
- M5 75mm gun

== N ==
- Nudelman Suranov NS-45 Cannon

== O ==
- Ordnance QF 6-Pounder Class M
- Ordnance QF 32 Pounder/3.7 inch AA gun

== P ==
- 75mm Pak 40

== V ==
- 47mm Vickers P

== See also ==
- List of artillery
- List of artillery by country
- List of World War II artillery
- List of naval guns
- List of weapons
- List of tank main guns
- List of grenade launchers
- List of recoilless rifles
