= The Great War and Modern Memory =

1975 book of literary criticism written by Paul Fussell

- First edition
- Author: Paul Fussell
- Language: English
- Genre: Literary criticism
- Publisher: Oxford University Press
- Publication date: 1975
- Publication place: United States
- Media type: Print
- ISBN: 0-19-513331-5

The Great War and Modern Memory is a book of literary criticism written by Paul Fussell and published in 1975 by Oxford University Press. It describes the literary responses by English participants in World War I to their experiences of combat, particularly in trench warfare. Fussell describes how the collective experience of the "Great War" was correlated with, and to some extent underlain by, an enduring shift in the worldview of individuals, from the tropes that had guided writers before the war to the harsher themes that came to be dominant during the war and after.

Fussell's criticism crosses genre boundaries, attempting to describe how the experience of the war forced them to share a common atmosphere in their essays, letters home, novels, humor, and poetry. The work of Northrop Frye is a powerful influence on Fussell's analysis of how the experience of the war altered the way they and their peers responded to the prewar world. Fussell later commented:

Also, I was very interested in the Great War, as it was called then, because it was the initial twentieth-century shock to European culture. By the time we got to the Second World War, everybody was more or less used to Europe being badly treated and people being killed in multitudes. The Great War introduced those themes to Western culture, and therefore it was an immense intellectual and cultural and social shock.

In The Great War and Modern Memory, Fussell describes the lives and works of many figures, with extended passages treating four English writers who saw combat on the Western front: Edmund Blunden, Robert Graves, Wilfred Owen, and Siegfried Sassoon. The experiences of trench warfare not only affected what these and other authors wrote during the conflict, but (if they survived the war) shaped their output for the remainders of their lives. He cites mid-20th century authors like Norman Mailer and Thomas Pynchon abundantly, demonstrating that World War I has continued to shape the literary imagination.

== Reception ==
The Great War and Modern Memory earned accolades from leading critics of its time, including Lionel Trilling, Frank Kermode, and William H. Pritchard. The book was honored with the last annual National Book Award in category Arts and Letters and with the inaugural National Book Critics Circle Award for Criticism. It was ranked #75 on the Modern Library's list of the 100 best non-fiction books of the 20th century.

The work has continued to be of interest to critics. Twenty years after its publication, Jay Winter criticized it for passing over the experiences of soldier-writers who found that conventional motifs were adequate to describe their states of mind: "This vigorous mining of eighteenth and nineteenth century images and metaphors to accommodate expressions of mourning is one reason why it is unacceptable to see the Great War as the moment when ‘modern memory’ replaced something else, something timeworn and discredited". And Dan Todman, in 2005, accused Fussell of writing "a work of polemic": "[Fussell] selected texts which supported his case. He therefore blinded himself to the variety of different literary reactions to the war, which included not only a striving for new modes of expression but also a falling back onto reassuring traditions." Todman considered the status of many of Fussell's protagonists unrepresentative and unusually alienated from the cultural traditions that appealed to the ranks. According to Todman, ordinary soldiers were more likely to read authors like Rudyard Kipling than poets influenced by aestheticism and symbolist poetry. Writing in History Today in 2014, Daniel Swift called it "a superb study of the literature and language of the Great War and specifically the metaphors and myths by which it was waged", but "lousy history."
