= Betty Fussell =

American writer (born 1927)

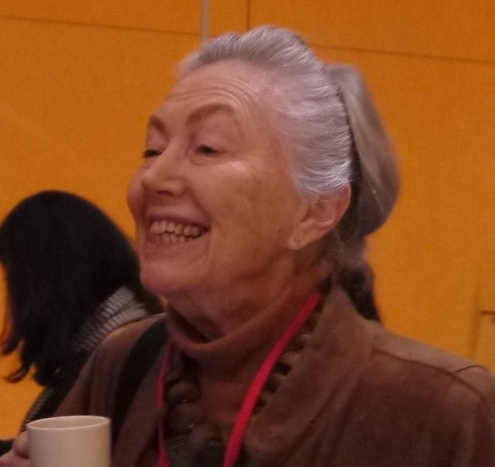
- Fussell in 2012
- Born: Betty Ellen Harper; July 28, 1927 (age 99); Riverside, California, U.S.
- Education: Pomona College (BA); Radcliffe College (MA); Rutgers University (PhD)
- Occupations: Writer, author, educator, historian
- Spouse: Paul Fussell (m. 1949; div. 1981)
- Children: 2
- Writing career
- Pen name: Betty Fussell
- Language: English
- Years active: 1952–present
- Genres: Biographies, Cookbooks, Food History, Memoirs
- Notable works: The New York Times, The New Yorker, Los Angeles Times, Saveur, Vogue, Food & Wine, Metropolitan Home, Gastronomica,"The Story of Corn", "I Hear America Cooking", My Kitchen Wars, Raising Steaks: The Life and Times of American Beef, "Mabel: Hollywood's First I-Don't-Care Girl"
- Notable awards: See Awards
- Website: bettyfussell.com

Betty Ellen Fussell (née Harper; born July 28, 1927) is an American writer and is the author of 12 books, ranging from biography to cookbooks, food history and memoir. Over the last 50 years, her essays on food, travel and the arts have appeared in scholarly journals, popular magazines and newspapers as varied as The New York Times, The New Yorker, Los Angeles Times, Saveur, Vogue, Food & Wine, Metropolitan Home and Gastronomica. Her memoir, My Kitchen Wars, was performed in Hollywood and New York as a one-woman show by actress Dorothy Lyman. Her most recent books are Eat Live Love Die, and How to Cook a Coyote: The Joy of Old Age.

== Personal life ==
Fussell was born in Riverside, California, on July 28, 1927, where she grew up. She married her college sweetheart Paul Fussell in 1949 and had two children, Rosalind and Sam Fussell. In 1981 the couple divorced.

Fussell has traveled widely throughout Europe, the Near East, Africa, India, China, Russia, Latin America, Southeast Asia. For many years, she lived in New York City. She resides in Santa Barbara, California.

=== Education ===
She earned a Bachelor of Arts in English from Pomona College in 1948, an M.A. from Radcliffe College in 1951 and a Ph.D. in English from Rutgers University in 1974. Her thesis focused on English Tragicomedy in the Renaissance.

== Teaching career ==
From 1952 to 1978 Fussell taught courses in English Literature, specializing in Shakespeare and the literature of comedy, drama, and film at a variety of colleges and universities, including Connecticut College, Douglass College, Rutgers University, and the New School University.

She began teaching classes focusing on food writing and food history beginning in 1993 at Columbia University, the French Culinary Institute, NYU's Food Studies program, and the New School University's Food Studies department.

== Editor and food historian ==
Early on in her career, Fussell edited many of her former husband Paul Fussell's works of literary criticism and military history. She became a columnist for Country Journal, a contributing editor to Lear’s, the editor of AIWF publication, Wine, Food & the Arts (1996, 1997), and is a current contributing editor to Food Arts. She briefly held a position as an editorial consultant for Atlantic Monthly Press.

Fussell has frequently appeared on national and cable networks, including the start-up of the Food Network. She has lectured on American food history at many venues, such as the Natural History Museum of the Smithsonian; Metropolitan Museum of Art in NY; Princeton University Art Museum; New York Historical Society; Radford University; New York University; New School University; Cornell University; Dartmouth College; AIWF National Conferences at the Smithsonian in Washington DC, in Boston, Miami, New York; AIWF branches at Washington DC, Santa Barbara, Chicago, Houston, Dallas, Cleveland; IACP National Conferences in San Francisco, Philadelphia, Portland, Phoenix, Montreal, Baltimore; Workshop for Professional Food Writers in West Virginia; keynote address to National Association for Interpretation in Cleveland; Nestle International in Ohio; Culinary Historians of New York, of Boston; Friends of Schlesinger Library in Cambridge; Cambridge School of Culinary Arts; Boston University; Johnson & Wales University; Institute of Culinary Education, French Culinary Institute, James Beard Foundation, Culinary Institute of America, New York University, The Mercantile Library, YMHA, Coffee House Club, National Arts Club, Dutch Treat Club, Century Association, Cosmopolitan Club.

== Written works ==
Betty Fussell's career began with her biography of silent film comedian Mabel Normand. She moved from writing about the history of film to the history of food in both short and long form. She has published countless articles in both popular and academic outlets and authored 12 books. Among her first food-focused books were Masters of American Cookery (Times Books: 1984), Eating In (Antaeus; Ecco Press: 1986), I Hear America Cooking (Viking/Penguin: 1986; paperback Penguin: 1997) and Food in Good Season (Alfred A. Knopf: 1988). She is a noted expert on the history of corn. She has written extensively on the subject and devoted two books to corn: The Story of Corn and Crazy for Corn. In her autobiographical book, Kitchen Wars, she discusses not only cooking and its importance to her life, but details of her personal life as well, including her marriage to Paul Fussell that ended in divorce.

=== Essays ===
Her essays on literature, theater, movies, comedy, travel, and food have appeared in a variety of publications, including The New York Times, Los Angeles Times, The New Yorker, Holiday, Travel and Leisure, Connoisseur, Vogue, Savvy, Lear’s, Cosmopolitan, Journal of Gastronomy, Food Arts, Wine and Food, Bon Appetit, Cooking Light, Redbook, Ladies Home Journal, More, Kitchen Gardener, Metropolitan Home, Saveur, Gourmet, Living History, American Horticulturist, Countryside Magazine. Her essay “On Murdering Eels and Laundering Swine” (Antaeus: Not for Bread Alone (Ecco Press: Spring, 1992) is listed in Best American Essays 1992, reprinted in A Literary Feast (Atlantic Monthly Press: 1993) and in Women on Hunting (Ecco Press: 1994).

Critical and scholarly essays include:

- English Literary History (“Structural Methods in Four Quartets”)
- Sewanee Review (“The Masks of Oscar Wilde”)
- Hudson Review (“On the Trail of the Lonesome Dramaturge”, “Waiting for *Tutankhamen: London Theatre”)
- Ontario Review (“Thanatopsis ’83”, “On ‘Reading’ Rooms”, “The Eyes Have It”)
- New York Literary Forum (“The ‘Neck Riddle’ & Dramatic Form”, “A *Pratfall Can Be a Beautiful Thing”)
- Culture Front (“A is for Apple: The Language of Food, Hunger, and Love”)
- Social Research (“From Maize to Corn”)
- Contributor to Virginia Woolf: Revaluation & Continuity (University of California Press: 1980)
- Contributor to Christmas Memories with Recipes (Farrar, Straus & Giroux:1988)
- Contributor to Kingsley Amis: In Life and Letters (Macmillan: 1990)
- Intro. to Jane Grigson, The Mushroom Feast (The Lyons Press: 1998)
- Articles for The Cambridge Guide to Women’s Writing in English, ed. *Lorna Sage (Cambridge University Press: 1999)
- Intro. to Setting the American Table: Essays for the New Culture
- Articles for Scribner’s Encyclopedia of Food and Culture (2003)
- Intro. to A Slice of Life: Contemporary Writers on Food (Penguin: 2003)
- Contributor to Copia:“Food as Power” Symposium 2003 of Food and Wine (Copia: 2001)
- Contributor to Living with a Writer (Macmillan: 2004)
- Articles for Culinary Biographies (Yes Press: 2004)

=== Books ===
Books include:

- Mabel: Hollywood’s First I-Don’t-Care Girl (Ticknor & Fields: 1982)
- Masters of American Cookery (Times Books: 1984)
- Eating In (Antaeus; Ecco Press: 1986)
- I Hear America Cooking (Viking/Penguin: 1986; paperback Penguin: 1997)
- Food in Good Season (Alfred A. Knopf: 1988)
- Home Plates (Dutton/Penguin: 1990)
- The Story of Corn (Alfred A. Knopf: 1992; paperback North Point Press FSG: 1999; *University of New Mexico Press: 2004)
- Crazy for Corn (HarperCollins: 1995)
- Home Bistro (Ecco Press: 1997)
- My Kitchen Wars (North Point Press FSG: 1999; University of Nebraska, (2009) (dramatized as one-woman play in Hollywood & NYC)
- Raising Steaks: The Life & Times of American Beef (HMH: 2008)
- Eat, Live, Love, Die: Selected Essays (Counterpoint Press: 2016)
- How to Cook a Coyote: The Joy of Old Age (Counterpoint Press: 2026)

== Awards ==
Betty Fussell won the Julia Child Cookbook Award in 1993 and the James Beard Foundation's Journalism Award. She was inducted into the Beard Foundation's Who's Who in American Food and Beverage in 2009. She won the IACP's Jane Grigson Award for Scholarship in 1993 and the Amelia Award of the Culinary Historians of New York in 2010.

Other Awards and Honors include:

- Fellowship to MacDowell Colony: Dewitt Wallace/Reader's Digest Fellow, 1993
- Fellowship to the Millay Colony for the Arts, 1994
- Fellowship to Villa Montalvo, 1994
- Fellowship to the Corporation of Yaddo, 1995, 1997
- Fellowship to Hawthornden Castle International Retreat for Writers, 1995
- Fellowship to Djerassi Resident Artists Program, 1996
- Scholar in Residence, IACP Conference in Phoenix, 1999
- Silver Spoon Award from Food Arts 2002
- James Beard Foundation Journalism Award 2008
- James Beard Foundation Who's Who in Food & Beverage 2009
- CHNY Amelia Award for Lifetime Achievement in Culinary History 2010
