= Edwin Sill Fussell =

American academic

Edwin Sill Fussell, Ph.D. (July 4, 1922 – August 27, 2002) was a professor of English literature at the University of California, San Diego. He was the elder brother of Paul Fussell.

== Early life ==
Fussell was born in Pasadena, California, United States, and grew up there. His father, Paul Longstreth Fussell (15 January 1895 – 16 July 1973), was a corporate lawyer in Los Angeles with the firm of O’Melveny & Myers. His mother was born Wilhma Wilson Sill in Illinois 21 August 1893 and died 23 March 1971. In 1943 Fussell earned a B.A. degree from Pomona College. Thereafter he joined the U.S. Navy, serving aboard a destroyer in the Pacific Theater of Operations during World War II. He received a Ph.D. from Harvard University in 1949.

== Career ==
Fussell first taught at the University of California at Berkeley. He refused to sign a loyalty oath during the era of Sen. Joseph McCarthy's "communist-hunting" in the early 1950s, losing his professorship as a result. Fussell then went to Pomona College, his alma mater, where he taught American Literature. After teaching at the Claremont Graduate School, Fussell joined the faculty of UC San Diego. He retired in 1991.

== Retirement ==
During his retirement, Fussell lived in Paris and Rome. He still wrote, especially about Henry James, Chateaubriand, and Balzac. Fussell died in August 2002 in La Jolla, CA.

== Works ==
- Frontier: American Literature and the American West (1966)
- Lucifer in Harness:American Meter, Metaphor, and Diction (1973)
- The Catholic Side of Henry James (1994)
- The French Side of Henry James (1990)
