= Paul Fussell =

American historian (1924–2012)

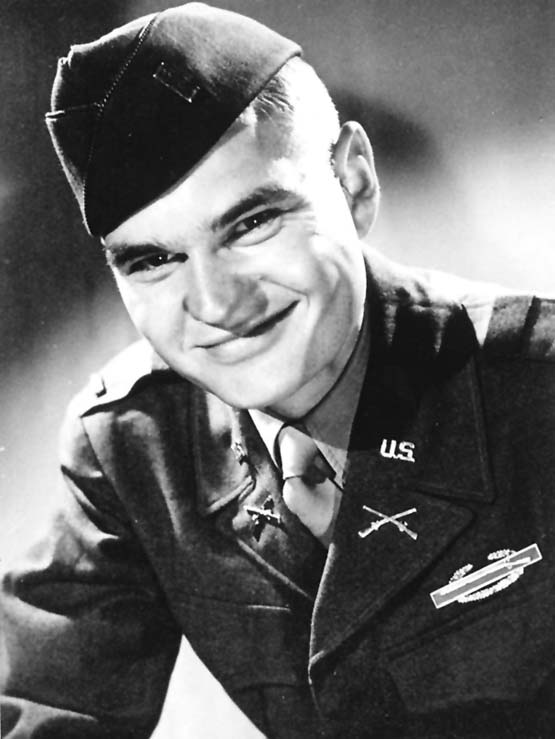
- Fussell in 1945
- Born: Paul Fussell Jr. 22 March 1924; Pasadena, California, U.S.
- Died: 23 May 2012 (aged 88); Medford, Oregon, U.S.
- Education: Pomona College (BA), Harvard University (MA), (PhD)
- Occupations: Educator; historian; social critic; author
- Spouses: Betty Harper (m. 1949; div. 1981) Harriette Behringer (m. 1987)
- Children: 2
- Writing career
- Language: English
- Years active: 1951–2003
- Genre: Non-fiction
- Notable awards: Literary: National Book Award; National Book Critics Circle Award; Ralph Waldo Emerson Award.
- Military career
- Allegiance: United States of America
- Conflicts: World War II
- Awards: Purple Heart; Bronze Star

Signature
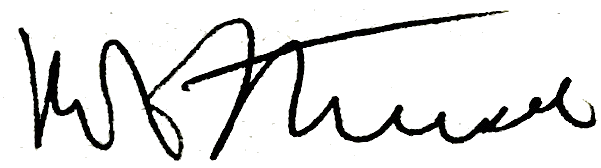

Paul Fussell Jr. (22 March 1924 – 23 May 2012) was an American cultural and literary historian, author and university professor. His writings cover a variety of topics, from scholarly works on eighteenth-century English literature to commentary on America's class system.

Fussell served in the 103rd Infantry Division during World War II and was wounded in fighting in France. Returning to the US, Fussell wrote extensively and held several faculty positions, most prominently at Rutgers University (1955–1983) and at the University of Pennsylvania (1983–1994). He is best known for his writings about World War I and II, which explore what he felt was the gap between the romantic myth and the reality of war; he made a "career out of refusing to disguise it or elevate it".

== Biography ==
Born and raised in Pasadena, California, Fussell was the sixth of seven children. His father, Paul Fussell (1895–1973), son of a widowed schoolteacher, became a corporate lawyer in Los Angeles with the firm of O'Melveny & Myers, and served as President of the Los Angeles County Bar Association in 1947. His mother, Wilhma Wilson Sill (1893–1971), was the daughter of a carriage trimmer in Illinois. His brother, Edwin Sill Fussell, was an author, poet, and professor of American Studies at the University of California, San Diego; his sister Florence Fussell Lind lived in Berkeley, California.

Starting in 1941, Fussell attended Pomona College until he enlisted in the United States Army in September 1942 and was commissioned as an officer the next year. He landed in France in fall 1944 as a 20-year-old second lieutenant with the 103rd Infantry Division, was wounded while fighting in Alsace, and was awarded the Bronze Star and Purple Heart. Following the end of the war in Europe, Fussell returned to the United States where he was assigned to the 45th Infantry Division, which was preparing for the anticipated Allied invasion of Japan. Fussell's recollections of hearing the news of the atomic bombings of Hiroshima and Nagasaki, while waiting stateside to deploy would later form the basis of his essay "Thank God for the Atom Bomb".

He was honorably discharged from the Army in 1946, returned to Pomona to finish his B.A. degree in 1946–1947, married fellow Pomona graduate Betty Harper in 1949, and completed his MA (1949) and PhD (1952) at Harvard University.

He began his teaching career at Connecticut College (1951–55) before moving to Rutgers University in 1955 and finally the University of Pennsylvania in 1983. He also taught at the University of Heidelberg (1957–58) and King's College London (1990–92). As a professor, he travelled widely with his family throughout Europe from the 1950s to '70s, taking Fulbright and sabbatical years in Germany, England and France.

Betty Fussell has described their marriage and its breakup in 1981 in her memoir, My Kitchen Wars. After Fussell moved from his home in Princeton, New Jersey, to Philadelphia, Pennsylvania, he divorced Betty and married Harriette Behringer. He retired from the University of Pennsylvania in 1994 and lived with his wife in Oregon.

His daughter, Rosalind, is an artist-teacher in Arizona and the author of a graphic novel, Mammoir: A Pictorial Odyssey of the Adventures of a Fourth Grade Teacher with Breast Cancer. His son, Samuel Wilson Fussell, a writer and hunter in Montana, is the author of Muscle: Confessions of an Unlikely Bodybuilder.

== Writing and teaching career ==
When he first entered college, Fussell intended a career in journalism. His plans changed when his sergeant was killed beside him in combat, about which he wrote in his memoir Doing Battle (1996). In his writings he opposed war, promoting instead a vision of rational enlightenment. He pointed to what he saw as the hypocrisy of governmental speech and the corruption of popular culture.

His published thesis, Theory of Prosody in Eighteenth-Century England, was developed into Poetic Meter and Poetic Form (1965), a popular textbook for understanding poetry. Samuel Johnson and The Life of Writing (1971) offered an analysis of the work of the English lexicographer, Samuel Johnson. The Anti-Egotist, Kingsley Amis: Man of Letters was a study of the life and work of friend and colleague, Kingsley Amis.

The award-winning The Great War and Modern Memory (1975) was a cultural and literary analysis of the impact of World War I on the development of modern literature and modern literary conventions. John Keegan said its effect was "revolutionary", in that it showed how literature could be a vehicle for expressing the experience of large groups. "What Paul did was go to the literary treatments of the war by 20 or 30 participants and turn them into an encapsulation of a collective European experience". Joseph Heller called it "the best book I know of about world war one". However, a number of modern historians have criticised Fussell's treatment of the war as deeply flawed with significant factual errors and tendentious conclusions.

Abroad: British Literary Travelling Between the Wars (1980) was a pioneering academic examination of travel literature which examined the travel books of Evelyn Waugh, Graham Greene, D. H. Lawrence and Robert Byron.

Fussell stated that he relished the inevitable controversy of Class: A Guide Through the American Status System (1983) and indulged his increasing public status as a loved or hated "curmudgeon" in the rant called BAD: or, The Dumbing of America (1991). In between, Thank God for the Atom Bomb and Other Essays (1988) confirmed his war against governmental and military doublespeak and prepared the way for Wartime: Understanding and Behavior in the Second World War (1989). The epiphany of his earlier essay, "My War", found full expression in his memoir Doing Battle: The Making of a Skeptic (1996): "My Adolescent illusions, largely intact to that moment, fell away all at once, and I suddenly knew I was not and never would be in a world that was reasonable or just". The last book by Fussell published while he was alive, The Boys' Crusade: The American Infantry in Northwestern Europe, 1944–45 (2003) was once again concerned with the experience of combat in World War II.

== Awards and honors ==
Fussell's 1975 literary study The Great War and Modern Memory won the National Book Award in category Arts and Letters, the National Book Critics Circle Award for Criticism, and the Ralph Waldo Emerson Award of Phi Beta Kappa. It was ranked number 75 in the Modern Library's Board's List of the 100 Best Nonfiction Books of the Twentieth Century.

He was elected in 1977 a Fellow of the Royal Society of Literature.

He won the 2005 Hessell-Tiltman Prize for The Boys' Crusade. Fussell was one of several veterans interviewed in the Ken Burns and Lynn Novick documentary The War in 2007, and in the 1999 ABC-produced documentary The Century: America's Time.

== Death ==
Fussell died of natural causes on 23 May 2012, at a long-term care facility in Medford, Oregon. He had previously lived in Portland, Oregon, for two years. He was 88.

== Works ==
- Theory of Prosody in Eighteenth-Century England. 1954.
- Poetic Meter and Poetic Form. 1965.
- The Rhetorical World of Augustan Humanism: Ethics and Imagery from Swift to Burke. 1965.
- Theory of Prosody in Eighteenth-Century England. 1966.
- Eighteenth-Century English Literature. 1969. editor with Geoffrey Tillotson and Marshall Waingrow
- Samuel Johnson and The Life of Writing. 1971.
- English Augustan Poetry. 1972.
- The Great War and Modern Memory. Oxford University Press. 1975. p. 384. ISBN 0-19-513332-3. OCLC 1631561.
- The Ordeal of Alfred M. Hale: The Memoirs of a Soldier Servant. 1975. editor
- Abroad: British Literary Travelling Between the Wars. 1980.
- The Boy Scout Handbook and Other Observations. 1982.
- Sassoon's Long Journey. 1983. editor, from The Complete Memoirs of George Sherston
- Class: A Guide Through the American Status System. Touchstone. 1983. ISBN 978-0-671-79225-1.
- Caste Marks: Style and Status in the USA. 1984. – this is the UK edition of Class
- The Norton Book of Travel. 1987. editor
- Thank God for the Atom Bomb and Other Essays. 1988.
- Wartime: Understanding and Behavior in the Second World War. Oxford University Press. 1989. pp. 352. ISBN 978-0-19-506577-0. OCLC 19125231.
- BAD – Or, The Dumbing of America. 1991.
- The Bloody Game: An Anthology of Modern War. 1991.
- The Norton Book of Modern War. W. W. Norton & Company. 1990. ISBN 0-393-02909-3. OCLC 21521876. editor
- The Anti-Egotist. Kingsley Amis: Man of Letters. 1994.
- Doing Battle – The Making of a Skeptic. Little, Brown and Company. 1996. ISBN 0-316-29717-8. OCLC 34192801. autobiography
- Uniforms: Why We Are What We Wear. Houghton Mifflin. 2002. ISBN 0-618-06746-9.
- The Boys' Crusade: The American Infantry in Northwestern Europe, 1944–1945. Modern Library. 2003. ISBN 0-679-64088-6.
